= Brindley Benn =

Guyanese teacher, choirmaster and politician

Brindley Horatio Benn

Minister of Community Development and Education
- In office 1957–1961
- Preceded by: Forbes Burnham
- Succeeded by: office abolished

Minister of Natural Resources
- In office 1961–1964
- Preceded by: Edward Balkaran Beharry
- Succeeded by: Robert James Jordan (as Forests, Lands and Mines)

Personal details
- Born: 24 January 1923 Georgetown, Guyana
- Died: 11 December 2009 (aged 86) Ogle, Guyana
- Party: People's Progressive Party
- Spouse: Patricia Benn

Brindley Horatio Benn, CCH (24 January 1923 – 11 December 2009) was a teacher, choirmaster, politician, and one of the key leaders of the Guyanese independence movement. He was put under restriction when the constitution was suspended in 1953. In 1957, Benn served as Minister of Community Development and Education in the first elected government of Guyana, and between 1961 and 1964 as Minister of Natural Resources. From 1993 to 1998, he served as High Commissioner of Guyana to Canada.

== Early life ==
Born in Kitty, Georgetown, Brindley Horatio Benn, named for the Methodist minister J.B. Brindley, was the second of two boys born to Rosa and Samuel Benn. He attended St. James-the-Less Primary School (now F. E. Pollard), Kitty, and also briefly attended a Roman Catholic School in Queenstown. Benn wrote his Junior and Senior Cambridge Examinations at the Central High School. He gained five subjects at Junior Cambridge – English Language, English History, Literature, Latin and French. He sat five subjects at Senior Cambridge but did not matriculate, since he did not pass Mathematics.

=== Early career ===
After finishing school, Benn travelled to Kwakwani to work as a clerk with the Bauxite Company. His parents were living in the mining community at the time and his father was a senior staff member at the Reynolds Mining and Metals Company. His mother was a caterer and a boarding house proprietor in the community, where she became popular for her activity in social and community life. Samuel Benn died in Kwakwani in 1948 and was buried there. Rosa remained in the community until the early 1960s, when she returned to Georgetown.

Benn returned to Georgetown in the early 1940s when the Bauxite Company started to scale down the workforce. He began teaching at a secondary school (currently the Richard Ishmael Secondary School) and briefly had his own school, Georgetown Secondary, which was located in Evans Street. He operated the school for about three years.

=== Choir involvement ===
Benn was a chorister at St. James the Less Anglican Church with Choirmasters who included the late Claude Merriman. He later became Choir Master at the St. Sidwell's Anglican Church around 1945 and served for about five years, until the Choir was disbanded. The Choir competed successfully at several choir festivals and became very popular with the public, especially its Friday practice sessions. St. Sidwell's Choir was the smallest at the time when it performed Stainer's The Crucifixion and was noted for performing some of the most difficult choral pieces then in existence. The organist was the legendary Carl Welshman. Some members of Benn's chorister group included the late broadcaster Matthew Allen, Senior Counsel Lloyd Joseph and Wittington Braithwaite.

After the Choir disbanded, Benn went to teach Latin and French at Richard Ishmael's Secondary School, where he organized a school choir which put on a concert at the Georgetown City Hall. He spent three years there.

== Political activity ==
One evening, during his teaching career, Benn attended a public meeting at Norton and John Streets, where he listened to Dr. Cheddi Jagan criticise the state of the bauxite industry and the colony of Guyana. Impressed by Dr. Jagan's speech, Benn joined the People's Progressive Party the same night. He immediately became very involved in politics, an avocation that led to conflict with his superior at the Secondary School. The principal, Richard Ishmael, was also President of the Manpower Citizens' Association, a union which represented sugar workers but which was widely considered a company union.

Benn subsequently left the school and became even more deeply involved in politics. He formed the Pioneer Youth League, the forerunner to the Progressive Youth Organisation (PYO).

=== Arrest and relocation ===
When the colonial constitution was suspended in 1953, Benn was detained and put under restriction orders in New Amsterdam, where he had gone to assess Party activity. He was ordered to report to the police between 8 and 10 a.m. every day except Sunday. His wife and three children regularly commuted by train to visit him where he lived with his brother, Lancelot, who worked as a driver mechanic with PWD at Canje.

After several raids by the army and the police on his brother's home, it was decided that his wife and family would move to New Amsterdam, where they established residence at 21 St. Magdelane Street. They lived there from 1954 to 1956 and the family increased by two with the birth of twins.

=== Party office ===
Upon his return to Georgetown in 1956, Benn was elected Chairman of the People's Progressive Party (PPP) and Member of the Executive Committee. The PPP contested the 1957 elections with Benn as the representative of the Essequibo Islands and the Interior. That single constituency comprised the largest single land area being contested in the country, and he came up against the candidacy of Mr. E. F. Corriea. He broke the long occupancy of the seat by Mr. Corriea when he won the election.

Benn was appointed Minister of Community Development and Education in 1957 and given an office across the road from the Parliament Building. During that time that he organised the National History and Culture Week (1961–1964) under the theme 'One People, One Nation, One Destiny', which later became independent Guyana's motto.

After the 1961 general elections, which the PPP also won, Benn was appointed Minister of Natural Resources. During this time he conceptualised and founded the Guyana School of Agriculture (1963). He oversaw the implementation of the Mahaica Mahaicony Abary (MMA) Scheme, Boersarie Scheme, Tapacuma Scheme and the Black Bush Polder – all major drainage and irrigation schemes.

=== Further strife ===
During the disturbances in the early 1960s, Benn was imprisoned by the British. During this period, the British successfully split the PPP along racial lines—the originally nationalist and multi-ethnic PPP became the party that was allegedly the party of Indo-Guyanese, whereas most Afro-Guyanese joined the People's National Congress (PNC). Brindley Benn became the most prominent Afro-Guyanese to remain with the PPP, making a statement against the divide-and-rule tactics of colonialism. The PPP was removed from office in 1964 by the political machinations of the British (see History of Guyana). Several Ministers and other important persons were detained. Among them was Brindley Benn, who was confined at Sibley Hall of Mazaruni Prison for several months.

=== A new direction ===
After his release in 1965, Benn became disenchanted by the differences in opinion in the PPP. He moved away from the party to establish his own – the Working People's Vanguard Party (WPVP). The WPVP printed a weekly mimeographed account of social, economic and political affairs occurring locally and internationally. Benn was for a time strongly attracted to the Maoist vision of a peasant-led social revolution. In the late 1970s, he joined with Walter Rodney, Eusi Kwayana, Andaiye, Moses Baghwan and Rupert Roopnaraine to form the Working People's Alliance. Discussions were held under the umbrella organization Patriotic Coalition for Democracy (PCD) in the fight for free and fair elections in Guyana.

=== Political renaissance ===
In 1992, with the return of democracy to Guyana, the PPP were returned to office by free and fair elections. Benn accepted President Dr. Jagan's offer to be on the PPP's list of candidates and won a seat in Parliament. He was later appointed Guyana's High Commissioner to Canada, a position he held with distinction from 1993 to 1998.

Upon his return to Guyana, Brindley Benn served as Chairman of the Public Service Commission for three years. He was also a member of the Teaching Service Commission and the Police Service Commission. Benn was the Chairman of the Guyana Lotteries Commission and served on the Appeals Board of the Guyana Revenue Authority.

== Death ==
Brindley died on 11 December 2009, aged 86, after a long illness.

== Personal life ==
Benn was a member of St. Paul's Anglican Church at Plaisance and of its Men's Guild.

He married his wife Patricia in 1951; they remained together throughout his life. The Benns had seven children – including fraternal twins – and eight grandchildren.

His son, Robeson Benn is a government minister.

== See also ==
- Working People's Vanguard Party
