= National Front Alliance =

Political party in Guyana

The National Front Alliance is a political party in Guyana.

== History ==
The party was formed on 1 December 2000 as a merger of the Guyana Democratic Party, the National Democratic Movement, the National Republican Party and the People United Party, although the GDP and PUP later withdrew. It first contested national elections in 2001, when it received just 417 votes and failed to win a seat. For the 2006 elections it was part of the People's National Congress–Reform coalition.

Prior to the 2011 elections it joined the A Partnership for National Unity alliance, which won 26 seats. The alliance formed a joint list with the Alliance for Change for the 2015 elections, which it went on to win. NFA leader Keith Scott became a minister in the new cabinet.
