= Dawn Hastings-Williams =

Guyanese politician

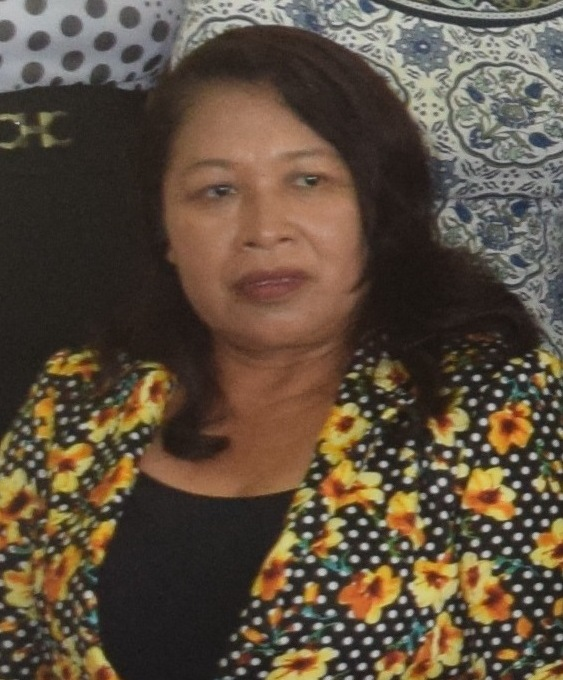
- Hastings in 2019

Member of the National Assembly
- Incumbent
- Assumed office 2011
- Constituency: Region VII - Cuyuni-Mazaruni

Personal details
- Born: Dawn Hastings Kako, Cuyuni-Mazaruni Region, Guyana
- Party: People's National Congress
- Education: University of Guyana

Dawn Hastings-Williams is a Guyanese politician. She has been a member of the National Assembly since 2011. She has previously served as Minister within the Ministry of Communities (2015-2017), Minister of Public Affairs (2017–2019), and Minister of State (2019–2020).

== Early life ==
Hastings was born in an Akawaio village, Kako, located in the Cuyuni-Mazaruni region (Region 7). She attended the local primary school, then later received a Hinterland Scholarship to study at Central High School in Georgetown. However, Hastings had to leave school in the fourth form when her mother died. At the age of 17, Hastings was able to resume her education: she entered Cyril Potter College of Education and completed a Certificate in Education (Primary). She then graduated from the University of Guyana with a Bachelor's degree in Education Administration. After graduation, she returned to her village and became the school headmistress.

== Politics ==
Hastings was nominated as a candidate of the People's National Congress (PNC) in February 2010. She was elected to the National Assembly for the PNC's APNU alliance in the 2011 general election, where she won a seat for the Geographic Constituency of Region 7.

Hastings was re-elected in the 2015 general election. In the APNU-AFC government, she served in several cabinet positions: Minister within the Ministry of Communities (2015–2017), Minister of Public Affairs (2017–2019), and Minister of State (2019–2020). She was the first indigenous Minister of State.

Hastings was appointed as a Principal Political Secretary of the PNC in 2017. She was elected again in the 2020 general election.
