= Charrandas Persaud =

Canadian-Guyanese lawyer and politician

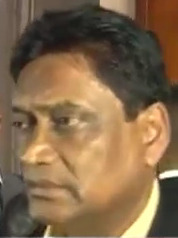
- Persaud in 2019

National Assembly member for East Berbice-Corentyne
- In office 2015 – December 2018
- President: David A. Granger
- Parliamentary group: Alliance for Change
- Constituency: East Berbice-Corentyne

Personal details
- Born: Georgetown, Guyana
- Party: Alliance for Change
- Education: University of Toronto
- Occupation: Lawyer; Politician

Charrandas Persaud is a Canadian-Guyanese lawyer and politician, who was Guyana's High Commissioner to India from March 2021 to October 2022. He was a member of the Guyanese National Assembly from 2015 to 2018, representing the Alliance for Change party in the East Berbice-Corentyne region (Region 6).

== Personal life ==
Persaud was born in Guyana, and moved to Canada in the 1970s and later obtained a real estate license. He returned to Guyana in 1999 and studied law at University of Guyana.

== Career ==
As a politician, Persaud was a member of the Alliance for Change (AFC) party. He joined the AFC in 2011, and campaigned for the AFC in Berbice. In 2013, Persaud left the AFC for two months, believing that he wasn't receiving due credit for his campaigning work. At the 2015 Guyanese general election, Persaud was elected to represent Region 6, East Berbice-Corentyne. The AFC formed a coalition government with A Partnership for National Unity (APNU).

As an Assembly member, Persaud worked on a bill to control the sale and use of tobacco in Guyana. The bill passed in July 2017. In late 2018, Persaud supported the government's budget for 2019. Persaud was critical of the government's downsizing of the Guyanese sugar industry, which he argued cost thousands of jobs. He also believed that the AFC was just blindly supporting APNU policies, and was particularly critical of a pension bill by prime minister Hamilton Green.

=== No-confidence vote controversy ===
In December 2018, Persaud voted against the AFC in a vote of no confidence tabled by the opposition People's Progressive Party (PPP). As a result of his vote, the vote was lost by the government by 33 votes to 32, triggering a general election. Persaud says that it was "the only time in three and half years as a Parliamentarian that I voted according to my conscience". After the vote, Persaud was expelled from the AFC party, and was removed as an assembly member. Persaud also received death threats.

The day after the vote, he fled to Toronto, Canada, via Barbados, fearing for his safety as Guyana has a history of political assassinations. After reaching Canada, Persaud chose not to pledge allegiance to any Guyanese political party, but criticised a number of AFC politicians including Prime Minister Moses Nagamootoo, Khemraj Ramjattan, and Raphael Trotman. Persaud was replaced by APNU's Barbara Pilgrim in the National Assembly. Pilgrim had been an APNU candidate in Region 6 at the 2015 election.

In Guyana, there were multiple judicial reviews of the vote, claiming that 34 votes should have been needed for the vote to stand, and that Persaud should have been ineligible to vote due to his dual Canadian nationality. One allegation was that Persaud was not a Guyanese citizen. The no confidence vote was eventually upheld, triggering the 2020 Guyanese general election. Persaud endorsed PPC candidate Irfaan Ali for the 2020 Guyanese election. In the court case, it was ruled that dual citizens could not be members of the Guyana National Assembly, forcing four government ministers to resign.

Persaud denied allegations that he was bribed or coerced to vote with the PPP. In March 2019, Persaud filed a $30 million lawsuit against Khemraj Ramjattan for libel relating to the vote of no confidence and a subsequent investigation started by Ramjattan. During the investigation, Persaud admitted to working on a 1 million USD gold deal for clients.

=== High commissioner ===
In March 2021, Persaud was appointed Guyana's High Commissioner to India. He was removed from his position in October 2022 after a video became viral of him insulting a woman for enquiring about a stray dog that lived in Persaud's compound. Persaud's driver had killed the dog.
