= National Democratic Front (Guyana) =

Political party in Guyana

The National Democratic Front (NDF) is a political party in Guyana.

== History ==
Founded by Joseph Bacchus, the party first contested national elections in 1985, when it received only 156 votes and failed to win a seat. In the 1992 elections it received just 68 votes and remained without parliamentary representation. In the 1997 elections it received 105 votes and again failed to win a seat.

Prior to the 2011 general elections the party joined the A Partnership for National Unity alliance. The alliance subsequently won 26 of the 53 seats in the National Assembly. In the build up to the 2015 elections the alliance formed a joint electoral list with the Alliance for Change, which won the elections.
