= Winston Jordan =

Guyanese politician

Winston Jordan MP
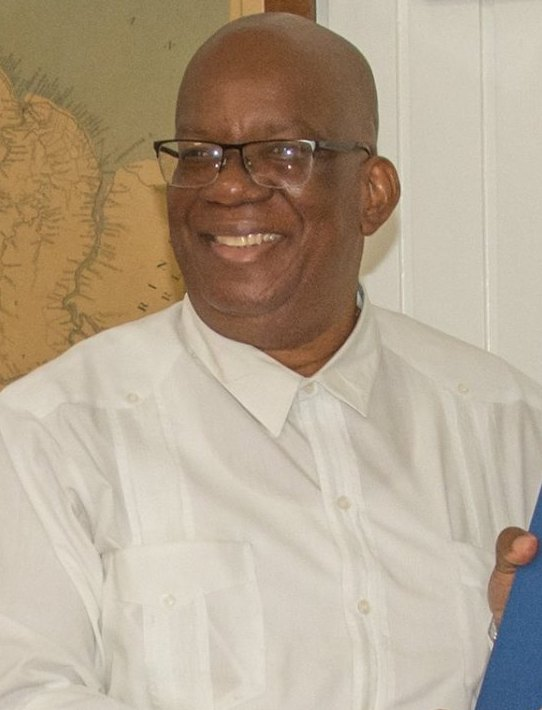

Minister of Finance
- In office 20 May 2015 – 2 August 2020
- Preceded by: Ashni Singh
- Succeeded by: Ashni Singh

Personal details
- Party: APNU + AFC

Winston DaCosta Jordan is a Guyanese politician. He served as Minister of Finance from May 2015 to August 2020. He served under the A Partnership for National Unity and Alliance for Change parties. Ashni Singh was appointed as his successor.

Jordan has a BS in economics from the University of Guyana and MS in economics from the University of Warwick. Prior to serving as finance minister in 2015, he was director of Gaibank from 1987―1992, Bauxite Development Company Limited from 1987-2003, Guyana Cooperative Financial Service from 1997―2005, alternate director of the Caribbean Development Bank from 1986―1992, as well as Temporary Governor and Alternate Governor to the Inter-American Development Bank, CDB and the International Monetary Fund/World Bank Group.

Jordan was held in criminal contempt in 2019 for the government's failure to pay Trinidad engineering and construction company Dipcon. Dipcon was awarded a US$2,228,400 judgement in 2015 by Justice Rishi Persaud, and on 25 June 2019, Justice Priya Sewnarine-Beharry ordered 21 days in prison if no payment was made by 8 July. At the deadline, Jordan was granted respite by President David Granger.

Political offices
Preceded by Ashni Singh	Minister of Finance; 2015–2020	Succeeded by Ashni Singh
