= Justice for All Party =

Political party in Guyana

The Justice for All Party (JFAP) is a political party in Guyana.

== History ==
The party first contested national elections in 1997, when it received 0.3% of the vote and failed to win a seat. In the 2001 elections its share of the vote rose to 0.7%, but it remained without parliamentary representation. In the 2006 elections it received 0.8% of the vote, but again failed to win a seat.

The party joined the A Partnership for National Unity alliance for the 2011 elections, with the alliance winning 26 of the 53 seats in the National Assembly. Prior to the 2015 elections JFAP leader Jaipaul Sharma said that it would contest the elections independently, but later returned to the APNU. The APNU formed a joint list with the Alliance for Change, which went on to win the elections.
