= Ashni Singh =

Guyanese politician

Ashni Singh MP
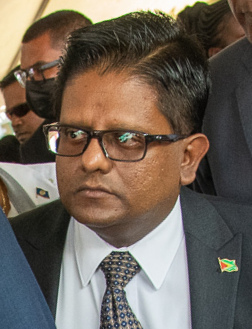
- Singh in 2022

Minister of Finance
- Incumbent
- Assumed office 5 November 2020
- President: Irfaan Ali
- Preceded by: Winston Jordan
- In office 9 August 2006 – 16 May 2015
- President: Bharrat Jagdeo; Donald Ramotar
- Preceded by: Saisnarine Kowlessar
- Succeeded by: Winston Jordan

Minister of Public Service
- Incumbent
- Assumed office 2 January 2024
- President: Irfaan Ali
- Preceded by: Sonia Parag

Member of the National Assembly
- Incumbent
- Assumed office 17 December 1992
- Constituency: National Top Up

Personal details
- Party: People's Progressive Party/Civic
- Children: 2

Ashni Kumar Singh is a Guyanese politician. He serves as Minister of Finance as of 5 November 2020. He also served in this role from September 2006 to May 2015.

Prior to his first appointment as minister, Singh was the Director of Budget in the Ministry of Finance and Deputy Auditor General in the Office of the Auditor General, as well as a chairman in the Governing Board of the Guyana Revenue Authority and the University of Guyana.

Between tenures as minister, he worked for the International Monetary Fund. As acting Minister, Singh also represented Guyana on the Boards of Governors of the IMF, the World Bank Group, the Inter-American Development Bank, and the Caribbean Development Bank.

Singh attended Queen's College, and has a PhD in Accounting and Finance from Lancaster University. He is married and has two children.

Political offices
Preceded by Winston Jordan	Minister of Finance; 2020–present	Incumbent
Preceded by Saisnarine Kowlessar	Minister of Finance; 2006–2015	Succeeded by Winston Jordan
