= Rise Organise and Rebuild Guyana =

Indo-Guyanese political party in Guyana

Rise Organise and Rebuild Guyana (ROAR) was an Indo-Guyanese political party in Guyana led by Ravi Dev.

== History ==
ROAR was established as a political party in 1999, and was the first party in the country to describe itself as being ethnically based. In the 2001 general elections it received 0.9% of the vote, winning a single seat, taken by Dev. For the 2006 elections it formed an alliance with the Guyana Action Party, which received 1.2% of the vote and won one seat.

Prior to the 2011 elections many of its members joined the Alliance for Change.
