= Ubraj Narine =

Pandit Ubraj Narine
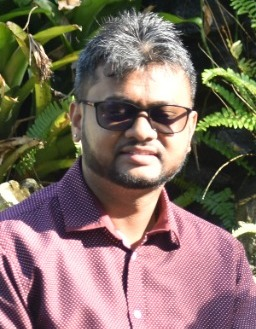

Mayor of Georgetown
- In office 1 December 2018 – 6 July 2023
- Deputy: Alfred Mentore
- Preceded by: Patricia Chase-Green
- Succeeded by: Alfred Mentore

Councilor for Kingston, Albertown, Queenstown and Cumminsburg
- In office 1 December 2018 – 6 July 2023
- Preceded by: Lionel Stanislaus Jaikaran
- Succeeded by: Mohamed Shazam Isfehani

Personal details
- Born: 12 October 1991 (age 34)
- Party: People's National Congress Reform
- Spouse: Meenakshi Narine
- Children: 2

Pt. Ubraj Narine (born 12 October 1991) is a Guyanese politician, paralegal and Hindu priest who was the Mayor of Georgetown, Guyana. He was elected in the November 2018 local government elections to represent Constituency 1 in the City Council and was subsequently elected as Mayor by the city council and re-elected in 2019 and 2020.

He did not seek re-election in 2023 to the City Council.

In 2025, towards the Guyana regional and local election, Ubraj publicly supported and endorsed the APNU party and was listed on the list of candidates.
