= National Independent Party (Guyana) =

Political party in Guyana

The National Independent Party is a political party in Guyana led by Saphier Husain Suebedar.

== History ==
The party was founded by Saphier Husain-Subedar, and contested the 1997 general elections with Shain Hussain as its presidential candidate. However, it received only 258 votes and failed to win a seat.

The party did not run in the 2001, 2006 or 2011 elections, but returned for the 2015 elections, in which it received just 262 votes (0.06%).
