= Tchaiko Kwayana =

US-born educator, pan-Africanist, and activist

- Born: Ann Cook; 24 June 1937; Georgia, United States
- Died: 24 May 2017 (aged 79)
- Other name: Tchaiko Ruramai Kwayana
- Occupations: Educator, pan-Africanist and civil rights activist
- Spouse: Eusi Kwayana (m. 1971)

Tchaiko Ruramai Kwayana, born Ann Cook (24 June 1937 – 6 May 2017), was an educator, pan-Africanist, and civil rights activist from Georgia, US. She was married to Eusi Kwayana, Guyanese politician.

== Biography ==
Born in segregated Georgia in 1937, she taught in segregated schools of the American south, until moving to Oakland, California. With the view that international travel was an important part of education, she taught in Nigeria, where she acquired elements of Yoruba culture. She also traveled to Mexico, Panama, and back in the US, sought places where she could find “African survivals” among the African diaspora of New York.

While abroad, she met Eusi Kwayana (then known as Sydney King) in Guyana, 1968. She was a key organizer of the seminar of "Pan-Africanists and Black Revolutionists" held in Guyana in 1970. They both changed their names, and married by Yoruba rites in 1971 in Georgetown. She was a member of ASCRIA, WPA, and eventually the Women Against Terror organisation fighting the Guyana dictatorship at the time. Her husband founded a private school in his hometown of Buxton, and she was a teacher there for 13 years.

She remained in Guyana until 1982, when she returned to the US for economic reasons as well as political victimization. She continued teaching, while involving herself in organisations such as LAD (a leadership training organization in San Diego). In Atlanta, she co-founded Helping Uplift Guyanese and co-founded the Sankofa Bird project, a "communities based Humanities program" that also assisted AIDS patients. She was awarded the title of "Queen Mother" by the Association for the Study of Classical African Civilizations. Both Kwayana and her husband were members of the Langston Hughes Poetry circle.

Eusi joined her in the US in 2002.

Tchaiko Kwayana died from cancer, aged 79, in 2017, and was survived by three children.

The Tchaiko Kwayana Scholarship was established for studies in science at the University of Guyana.

== Works ==
- "Black Pride? Some Contradictions" in The Black Woman, 1968, as Ann Cook (ISBN 0743476972)
- Scars of Bondage, Free Press, 1973, with Eusi Kwayana (ISBN 9789768178015)
- "The Identity Paper: Parents Join with Students to Write Family History", 1996 English Journal (https://doi.org/10.2307/821125)
