= GLP =

GLP or glp may refer to:

== Biology ==
- Glucagon-like peptide-1 (GLP-1)
  - GLP-1 receptor agonists, also known as "GLPs"
- Glucagon-like peptide-2 (GLP-2)
- G9a-like protein
- Genetic Literacy Project
- Good laboratory practice

== Political parties ==
- Gomantak Lok Pox, India
- Gombey Liberation Party, Bermuda
- Green Liberal Party of Switzerland
- Guyana Labour Party

== Other uses ==
- GLP (company), Singapore
- Gdynia Literary Prize, Poland
- Gibson Les Paul, a solid-body electric guitar
- German Longhaired Pointer, a German breed of gundog of pointer type
- Global Land Project, in climatology research
- Good Law Project, United Kingdom
- Green Launching Pad, United States
- Guadeloupe, France (ISO 3166-1 alpha-3 code: GLP)
- Globus Airlines, Russia (ICAO code: GLP)
- Gollaprolu railway station, India (Indian Railways code: GLP)
