= GBG =

GBG may refer to:

== Transportation ==
- Galesburg Municipal Airport, in Illinois, United States
- Gorebridge railway station, in Scotland
- Gramsbergen railway station, in the Netherlands

== Other uses ==
- Gbanzili language
- G beta-gamma complex
- GB Group plc, a UK public company focused on identity verification, location intelligence and fraud detection
- Georgeson Botanical Garden, in Fairbanks, Alaska, United States
- God Bless Guyana, a defunct political party in Guyana
- Good Beer Guide
- Good Behavior Game, a classroom behavior management strategy
- Google Business Groups
- Gothenburg, Sweden
- Green bean galaxy
- Guernsey, Channel Islands
- Star Wars: Galactic Battlegrounds, a computer game
- Game Builder Garage, a Nintendo Switch game
