= Working People's Vanguard Party =

Defunct Maoist political party in Guyana

- Founded: 1969
- Dissolved: 1980
- Split from: People's Progressive Party
- Ideology: Communism; Marxism-Leninism; Maoism; Anti-revisionism

Working People's Vanguard Party (WPVP) was a small, Maoist political party in Guyana. It was formed in 1969 through a split in the People's Progressive Party (PPP) in the 1960s. The party was led by Brindley Benn and Victor Downer. Initially the party advocated a violent overthrow of the People's National Congress government, but later shifted to the right and entered into an alliance with pro-capitalist groups.

== Council of Landless People ==
In 1973, the WPVP supported the Council of Landless People who had attempted to retake ancestral lands that were being encroached upon by the state and the sugar industry. Two thousand people had occupied 200 acres of land. The police evicted them and burned their shacks, triggering a large protest movement. This campaign, backed by a coalition that included the People's Progressive Party, later won a partial victory when the Sugar Producer's Association returned some of the land to the original residents.

== Alliances ==
WPVP took part in the formation of the Working People's Alliance in 1974. In 1976, withdrew from the Working People's Alliance in 1977. In 1980 WPVP joined forces with the "rightist" Liberator Party led by Ganraj Kumar and the People's Democratic Movement to form the Vanguard for Liberation and Democracy.

== People's Temple exposés ==
On 25 December 1977, a WPVP newspaper called The Beacon and edited by Brindley Benn published an exposé of the People's Temple group which had established a compound called Jonestown in Guyana. The article repeated allegations by disaffected former members of the People's Temple which had been published in an American magazine called New West. A few days later, public relations people working for People's Temple founder Jim Jones visited Benn and insisted that he retract his criticism, saying "they were surprised by an attack coming from a comrade in socialism." Benn refused, and wrote another story published on 22 January 1978 in another WPVP publication The Hammer, demanding that the police commissioner investigate the People's Temple. "Vanguard Publications believes that all is not above board with the People's Temple, although Rev. Jones appeared photographed with the Prime Minister. Vanguard is determined to secure every information, local and foreign, on the sect." On 18 November 1978, security staff of the People's Temple murdered American Congressman Leo Ryan on the airstrip at Port Kaituma. Later in the day, Jim Jones and his followers committed mass suicide. In all, 918 people died at Jonestown.
