= Progressive Youth Organisation =

Progressive Youth Organisation may refer to:

- Progressive Youth Organization (PY), a Maoist organization in Afghanistan (1965-1972)
- Progressive Youth Organization (Lebanon), a Lebanese member of the International Union of Socialist Youth
- Progressive Youth Organisation of Guyana, a wing of the Guyanese People's Progressive Party (PPP)
