= 1997 Guyanese general election =

- 15 December 1997

53 of the 65 seats in the National Assembly 33 seats needed for a majority
- Registered: 461,481
- Turnout: 88.42% (▼0.28pp)
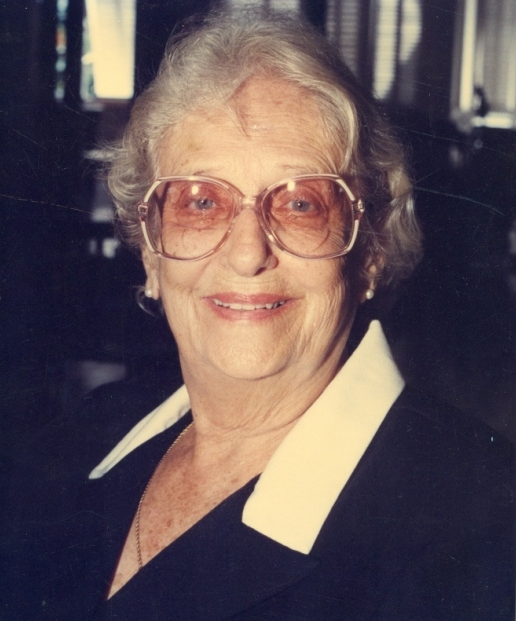

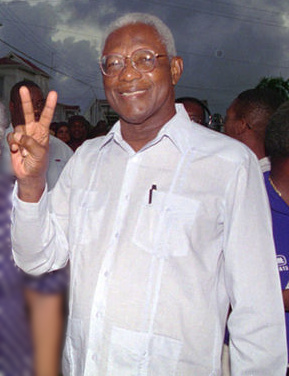
	First party	Second party
Candidate	Janet Jagan	Desmond Hoyte
Party	PPP/C	PNC
Last election	53.45%, 32 seats	42.31%, 31 seats
Seats won	34	26
Seat change	▲2	▼5
Popular vote	220,667	161,901
Percentage	55.26%	40.55%
Swing	▼1.81pp	▼1.76pp
- Results by district
President before election
Sam Hinds
PPP/C
Elected President
Janet Jagan
PPP/C

General elections were held in Guyana on 15 December 1997. The result was a victory for the People's Progressive Party/Civic, which won 29 of the 53 seats. Voter turnout was 88.4%.

== Electoral system ==
The National Assembly had 65 members; 53 elected by proportional representation in a nationwide constituency, 10 appointed by the Regional Councils elected on the same date as the national members, and 2 appointed by the National Congress of Local Democratic Organs, an umbrella body representing the regional councils. These were the last elections to feature that electoral system, as the electoral law was amended in February 2001 ahead of the elections in March that year.

The President was elected by a first-past-the-post double simultaneous vote system, whereby each list nominated a presidential candidate and the presidential election itself was won by the candidate of the list having a plurality.

== Results ==
Party	Presidential candidate	Votes	%	Seats			
Party	Presidential candidate	Votes	%	Elected	Appointees	Total	+/–
People's Progressive Party/Civic	Janet Jagan	220,667	55.26	29	5	34	+2
People's National Congress	Desmond Hoyte	161,901	40.55	22	4	26	–5
United Force	Manzoor Nadir	5,937	1.49	1	0	1	0
Working People's Alliance–Guyana Labour Party	Rupert Roopnarine	4,783	1.20	1	0	1	0
Guyana Democratic Party	Asgar Ally	2,528	0.63	0	1	1	New
Good and Green Guyana	Hamilton Green	1,552	0.39	0	0	0	New
Justice for All Party	Chandra N. Sharma	1,265	0.32	0	0	0	New
God Bless Guyana	Hardatt Persaud	314	0.08	0	0	0	New
National Independent Party	Saphier Husain	258	0.06	0	0	0	New
National Democratic Front	Joseph Bacchus	105	0.03	0	0	0	0
Independents				–	2	2	+2
Total		399,310	100.00	53	12	65	0
Valid votes		399,310	97.86				
Invalid/blank votes		8,747	2.14				
Total votes		408,057	100.00				
Registered voters/turnout		461,481	88.42				
Source: Nohlen, IPU, Guyana Elections Commission, OAS
