= 2015 Guyanese general election =

- 11 May 2015

All 65 seats in the National Assembly 33 seats needed for a majority
- Registered: 585,727
- Turnout: 71.03% (▼1.89pp)
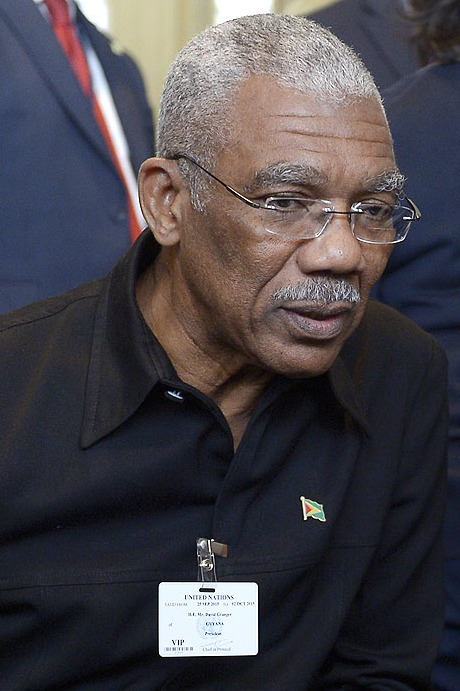

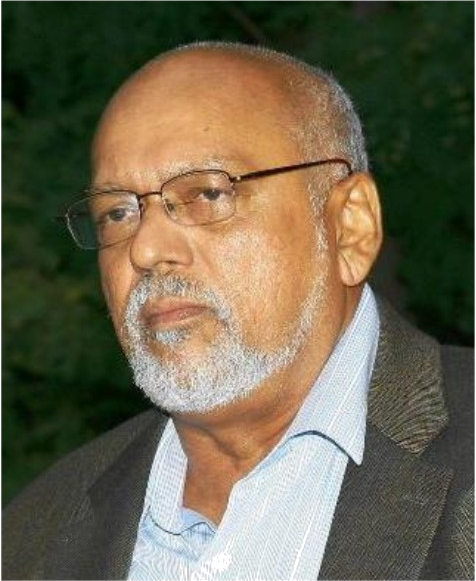
	First party	Second party
Candidate	David A. Granger	Donald Ramotar (Note: Bharrat Jagdeo was the leader of the PPP/C at the time of the elections, but Ramotar was chosen as the party's presidential candidate as Jagdeo was ineleigible to serve a third term as President of Guyana)
Party	PNCR	PPP/C
Alliance	APNU+AFC
Last election	51.14%, 33 seats (Note: Combined result of the APNU and AFC, which ran separately)	48.60%, 32 seats
Seats won	33	32
Seat change	Steady	Steady
Popular vote	207,201	202,656
Percentage	50.29%	49.20%
Swing	▼0.85pp	▲0.59pp
- Results by district
President before election
Donald Ramotar
PPP/C
Elected President
David A. Granger
PNCR

Early general elections were held in Guyana on 11 May 2015, alongside regional elections as a result of President Donald Ramotar proroguing the National Assembly. The result was a victory for the Partnership for National Unity+Alliance for Change (APNU+AFC) alliance, which won 33 of the 65 seats in the National Assembly. Following the elections, APNU leader David A. Granger was sworn in as president on 16 May 2015.

== Background ==
Early elections were called as a result of a stand-off between President Donald Ramotar and the National Assembly; after the President had defied spending cuts imposed by the National Assembly, the legislature called for a motion of no confidence. Ramotar subsequently suspended the National Assembly in November 2014 and dissolved it three months later. Ramotar announced the election date on 20 January 2015.

== Electoral system ==
The 65 elected members of the National Assembly were elected using closed list proportional representation from a single nationwide 40-seat constituency and 10 sub-national constituencies with a total of 25 seats. Seats are allocated using the Hare quota.

The President was elected by a first-past-the-post double simultaneous vote system, whereby each list nominated a presidential candidate and the presidential election itself was won by the candidate of the list having a plurality.

== Results ==
=== National Assembly ===
Party	Presidential candidate	Votes	%	Seats			
Party	Presidential candidate	Votes	%	Constituency	Top-up	Total	+/–
A Partnership for National Unity+Alliance for Change	David A. Granger	207,200	50.29	13	20	33	0
People's Progressive Party/Civic	Donald Ramotar	202,694	49.20	12	20	32	0
The United Force	Marissa Nadir	1,080	0.26	0	0	0	0
United Republican Party	Vishnu Brandhu	432	0.10	0	0	0	New
Independent Party	Mark Benschop	344	0.08	0	0	0	New
National Independent Party	Saphier Hussain Subedar	262	0.06	0	0	0	New
Total		412,012	100.00	25	40	65	0
Valid votes		412,012	99.03				
Invalid/blank votes		4,043	0.97				
Total votes		416,055	100.00				
Registered voters/turnout		585,727	71.03				
Source: GECOM, The Official Gazette

=== List of elected MPs ===
Name	Party	Coalition	Alliance	Constituency
Adrian Venkatasuma Anamayah	PPP/C	-	-	National Top-Up
Africo Archibald Selman	PPP/C	-	-	National Top-Up
Alister Saturnius Charlie	PPP/C	-	-	IX-Upper Takutu-Upper Essequibo
Amna Ally	PNCR	APNU	APNU+AFC	National Top-Up
Annette Natasha Ferguson	PNCR	APNU	APNU+AFC	National Top-Up
Audwin Andrew Rutherford	AFC	-	APNU+AFC	National Top-Up
Basil Williams	PNCR	APNU	APNU+AFC	IV-Demerara-Mahaica
Bharrat Jagdeo	PPP/C	-	-	National Top-Up
Bheri Sygmond Ramsaran	PPP/C	-	-	National Top-Up
Carl Barrington Greenidge	PNCR	APNU	APNU+AFC	National Top-Up
Carnel Damon	PPP/C	-	-	II-Pomeroon-Supenaam
Catherine Andrea Hughes	AFC	-	APNU+AFC	National Top-Up
Charles Shiva Ramson	PPP/C	-	-	National Top-Up
Charrandas Persaud	AFC	-	APNU+AFC	National Top-Up
Clement James Rohee	PPP/C	-	-	National Top-Up
Clive Ramesh Jagan	PPP/C	-	-	National Top-Up
Collin David Croal	PPP/C	-	-	IBarima-Waini
David Anthony Patterson	AFC	-	APNU+AFC	National Top-Up
Dawn Hastings-Williams	PNCR	APNU	APNU+AFC	VII-Cuyuni-Mazaruni
Dharamkumar Seeraj	PPP/C	-	-	National Top-Up
Frank Christopher Stanislaus Anthony	PPP/C	-	-	National Top-Up
Gail Teixeira	PPP/C	-	-	National Top-Up
Ganga Persaud	PPP/C	-	-	National Top-Up
George Aubrey Norton	PNCR	APNU	APNU+AFC	National Top-Up
Gillian Rosemarie Persaud	PPP/C	-	-	IV-Mahaica-Berbice
Hans Dominic Gaskin	AFC	-	APNU+AFC	National Top-Up
Harry Gill	PPP/C	-	-	National Top-Up
Hemraj Bernard Rajkumar	PNCR	APNU	APNU+AFC	II-Pomeroon-Supenaam
Indranie Chandarpal	PPP/C	-	-	National Top-Up
Jaipaul Sharma	JFAP	APNU	APNU+AFC	IV-Mahaica-Berbice
Jennifer Janet Wade	PNCR	APNU	APNU+AFC	V-Mahaica-Berbice
Jennifer Reginalda Ann Westford	PPP/C	-	-	VII-Cuyuni-Mazaruni
Jermaine Adrian Figueira	PNCR	APNU	APNU+AFC	X-Upper Demerara-Berbice
Joseph Frederick Harmon	PNCR	APNU	APNU+AFC	National Top-Up
Joseph Linden Fitzclarence Hamilton	PPP/C	-	-	National Top-Up
Juan Anthony Edghill	PPP/C	-	-	National Top-Up
Karen Roslyn Vanessa Cummings	PNCR	APNU	APNU+AFC	National Top-Up
Khemraj Ramjattan	AFC	-	APNU+AFC	National Top-Up
Komal Nandlall Chand	PPP/C	-	-	III-Essequibo Islands-West Demerara
Michael Carrington	PNCR	APNU	APNU+AFC	National Top-Up
Mohabir Anil Nandlall	PPP/C	-	-	IV-Demerara-Mahaica
Mohamed Irfaan Ali	PPP/C	-	-	III-Essequibo Islands-West Demerara
Moses Veerasammy Nagamootoo	AFC	-	APNU+AFC	National Top-Up
Neend Kumar	PPP/C	-	-	IV-Demerara-Mahaica
Nicolette Odella Henry	PNCR	APNU	APNU+AFC	National Top-Up
Nigel Deonarine Dharamlall	PPP/C	-	-	National Top-Up
Noel Leroy Holder	AFC	-	APNU+AFC	National Top-Up
Odinga Lumumba	PPP/C	-	-	National Top-Up
Pauline Rose Ann Campbell-Sukhai	PPP/C	-	-	National Top-Up
Priya Devi Manickchand	PPP/C	-	-	V-Mahaica-Berbice
Rajcoomarie Gloria Bancroft	AFC	-	APNU+AFC	VIII- Potaro-Siparuni
Raphael Gregory Conwright Trotman	AFC	-	APNU+AFC	National Top-Up
Richard Version Allen	PNCR	APNU	APNU+AFC	I-Barima-Waini
Ronald Azam Bulkan	PNCR	APNU	APNU+AFC	National Top-Up
Rupert Roopnaraine	WPA	APNU	APNU+AFC	National Top-Up
Simona Judie Charles Broomes	PNCR	APNU	APNU+AFC	National Top-Up
Valarie Kaloo Garrido-Lowe	AFC	-	APNU+AFC	X-Upper Demerara-Berbice
Valerie Rosanne Patterson-Yearwood	PNCR	APNU	APNU+AFC	X-Upper Demerara-Berbice
Vindhya Vasini Harshkumari Persaud	PPP/C	-	-	National Top-Up
Vishwa Deva Budhram Mahadeo	PPP/C	-	-	VI-East Berbice-Corentyne
Volda Ann Lawrence	PNCR	APNU	APNU+AFC	IV-Demerara-Mahaica
Winston da Costa Jordan	AFC	-	APNU+AFC	National Top-Up
Yvonne Fredericks-Pearson	PPP/C	-	-	National Top-Up
Zulfikar Mustapha	PPP/C	-	-	VI-East Berbice-Corentyne
Source: National Assembly - The Official Gazette

==== By region ====
Region	APNU+AFC			PPP/C			TUF		URP		IP		NIP		Hare quota	Total votes	Total seats
Region	Votes	%	Seats	Votes	%	Seats	Votes	%	Votes	%	Votes	%	Votes	%	Hare quota	Total votes	Total seats
Barima-Waini	2,788	30.51	1	6,278	68.69	1	59	0.65	14	0.15	0	0.00	0	0.00	4,570	9,139	2
Pomeroon-Supenaam	7,306	31.15	1	16,045	68.42	1	49	0.21	27	0.12	7	0.03	17	0.07	11,726	23,451	2
Essequibo Islands-West Demerara	20,912	33.93	1	40,480	65.68	2	102	0.17	56	0.09	47	0.08	32	0.05	20,543	61,629	3
Demerara-Mahaica	113,856	61.61	4	70,241	38.01	3	256	0.14	130	0.07	203	0.11	120	0.06	26,395	184,806	7
Mahaica-Berbice	13,416	44.44	1	16,644	55.14	1	49	0.16	36	0.12	15	0.05	27	0.09	15,094	30,187	2
East Berbice-Corentyne	22,103	35.65	1	39,610	63.90	2	125	0.20	73	0.12	34	0.05	47	0.08	20,664	61,992	3
Cuyuni-Mazaruni	4,599	59.09	1	2,981	38.30	1	171	2.20	13	0.17	0	0.00	19	0.24	3,892	7,783	2
Potaro-Siparuni	1,837	49.16	1	1,836	49.13	0	48	1.28	16	0.43	0	0.00	0	0.00	3,737	3,737	1
Upper Takutu-Upper Essequibo	3,592	37.63	0	5,794	60.70	1	131	1.37	29	0.30	0	0.00	0	0.00	9,546	9,546	1
Upper Demerara-Berbice	16,791	85.05	2	2,785	14.11	0	90	0.46	38	0.19	38	0.19	0	0.00	9,871	19,742	2
National assembly top up	207,201	50.29	20	202,656	49.20	20	1,099	0.26	418	0.10	342	0.08	254	0.06	6,338	411,970	40
Source: GECOM Official Gazette

=== Regional assemblies ===
Region	APNU+AFC		PPP/C		TUF		URP		HTNTP		OVP		Total votes
Region	Votes	%	Votes	%	Votes	%	Votes	%	Votes	%	Votes	%	Total votes
Barima-Waini	2,730	29.93	6,295	69.02	96	1.05	–	–	–	–	–	–	9,121
Pomeroon-Supenaam	7,231	30.91	16,040	68.56	52	0.22	72	0.31	–	–	–	-	23,395
Essequibo Islands-West Demerara	20,824	33.83	40,465	65.74	118	0.19	149	0.24	–	–	–	–	61,556
Demerara-Mahaica	112,366	61.08	70,095	38.05	383	0.02	508	0.28	417	0.23	292	0.16	183,954
Mahaica-Berbice	13,352	44.34	16,622	55.20	58	0.19	79	0.26	–	–	–	–	30,111
East Berbice-Corentyne	21,953	35.52	39,523	63.94	135	0.22	203	0.33	–	–	–	–	61,813
Cuyuni-Mazaruni	4,533	58.55	2,973	38.40	178	2.30	59	0.75	–	–	–	–	7,742
Potaro-Siparuni	1,791	48.21	1,837	49.45	48	1.27	39	1.08	–	–	–	–	3,715
Upper Takutu-Upper Essequibo	3,553	37.31	5,764	60.53	140	1.47	66	0.69	–	–	–	–	9,523
Upper Demerara-Berbice	16,671	84.85	2,763	14.06	108	0.55	106	0.54	–	–	–	–	19,648
Total	205,004	49.93	202,377	49.26	1,316	0.32	1,281	0.31	418	0.10	294	0.07	410,578
Source: GECOM
