= Eusi Kwayana =

Guyanese politician (1925–2026)

- Born: Sydney Evanson King; 4 April 1925; Lusignan, British Guiana
- Died: 10 October 2026 (aged 101); Atlanta, Georgia, U.S.
- Occupations: Politician, playwright
- Spouse: Tchaiko Kwayana (m. 1971; died 2017)

Eusi Kwayana (born Sydney Evanson King; 4 April 1925 – 10 October 2026) was a Guyanese politician. A cabinet minister in the People's Progressive Party (PPP) government of 1953, he was detained by the British Army in 1954. Later he left the PPP to form ASCRIA (African Society for Cultural Relations with Independent Africa), a Pan-Africanist grassroots political group that, after a brief flirtation with the People's National Congress (PNC) of Forbes Burnham, fused into the Working People's Alliance (WPA). Kwayana was also a playwright.

== Life and career ==
Kwayana was born in Lusignan, British Guiana (now Guyana) on 4 April 1925, and his family moved to Buxton when he was aged seven. He became a primary school teacher at the age of 15. In 1956, he founded and became principal of County High School, later renamed Republic Cooperative High School, in Buxton.

During the 1940s he began to be politically active at the village level. Around 1947 (at that time known as Sydney King), he became a member of a small group of politicians, led by Cheddi Jagan, who formed the People's Progressive Party (PPP). After the PPP won in Guyana's first election under universal adult suffrage, Kwayana became Minister of Communication and Works. After the British government suspended the constitution and threw the PPP out of office, in October 1953, Kwayana and others were made political detainees for fear that they would cause civil unrest. He was an executive member of both the PPP and subsequently the People's National Congress (PNC).

He met his wife Tchaiko Kwayana (formerly Ann Cook), a pan-Africanist, and civil rights activist from Georgia, in 1968, as she was travelling from Brazil back to the US. They married in 1971 in Georgetown with Yoruba rites and she was involved in Kwayana's organizational building.

Kwayana co-founded the African Society for Racial Equality (ASRE), and later, the African Society for Cultural Relations with Independent Africa (ASCRIA), which in 1974 became part of the Working People's Alliance (WPA). He was a member of the WPA's collective leadership and worked closely with Walter Rodney. He was the sole WPA member of parliament elected in 1985.

He was the author of several books, including Next Witness, The Bauxite Strike and the Old Politics (2014), Scars of Bondage, Guyana: No Guilty Race, Buxton in Print and Memory, Morning After, Genesis of a Nation: The Indo-Guyanese Contribution to Social Change (in Guyana) and Walter Rodney: His Last Days and Campaigns (2009). Kwayana also wrote the lyrics of the party songs of Guyana's three leading political parties, the PPP, PNC and WPA.

A production of his play The Promised Land, performed by a young cast from Buxton, won the "Best Play" Prize in the Youth Category at the British Guiana Drama Festival of 1965.

In 2002, he retired and moved to California in the United States. As of March 2021, he was reported living in Atlanta, Georgia.

Kwayana died in his home in Atlanta, Georgia, on 10 October 2026, at the age of 101.

== Selected bibliography ==
- 2009: Walter Rodney: His Last Days and Campaigns. R. Ferdinand-Lalljie Publishers.
- 2014: The Bauxite Strike and Old Politics. Atlanta: On Our Own Authority! Publishing. ISBN 978-0-990-6418-0-3
- 2016: A New Look At Jonestown: Dimensions from a Guyanese Perspective, Carib House. ISBN 978-0-936-3780-2-2
