= People's Democratic Movement (Guyana) =

The People's Democratic Movement (PDM) was a centrist political party in Guyana.

== History ==
The PDM was established in 1973, and contested the general elections later that year. It received only 0.6% of the vote and failed to win a seat.

In 1980 it joined the Vanguard for Liberation and Democracy alliance alongside the Liberator Party and the Working People's Vanguard Party. The alliance did not contest the 1980 elections, but instead called for civil disobedience against the government.

The PDM was the only party in the alliance to survive until the 1985 elections, when it received just 232 votes and again failed to win a seat. In the 1992 elections it saw an increase in its vote, but only to 270, and remained without a seat in the National Assembly. The party did not contest any further elections.
