= Sophia, Georgetown =

Sophia
- Ward
- Location in Guyana
- Coordinates: 6.8146°N 58.1173°W
- Country: Guyana
- City: Georgetown

Population (2012)
  - Total: 3,687

Sophia is a ward of Georgetown, the capital of Guyana. It is a predominantly Afro-Guyanese community, and formerly one of Georgetown's poorest neighbourhoods.

Sophia was where Forbes Burnham, then Prime Minister of Guyana, presented "Declaration of Sophia" at a People's National Congress meet in December 1974. It outlined the plan for nationalization as a part of a "socialist revolution".

== Location ==
Sophia is bounded by the Downer Street Canal in the East, the Eastern Highway and Ganges Street in the West, the Lamaha conservancy in the South and the railway embankment as the northern boundary. However, Lilliendaal (south), Pattensen (south), Turkeyen (south) and Cummings Park are areas east of Sophia that are all included for the sake of "common ground" whenever Sophia is thought of as a catchment area.

== Services ==
Sophia has a Multi-purpose Community Centre, a Youth Vocational Centre (established by the Catholic Church in 2002), and a small Youth Friendly space serves as recreation for youths. Other facilities are located in the community including a Care Centre for children removed from unsafe homes, a Juvenile Detention centre and a youth Training Centre.

Schools include Nursery, Primary, a Special School and a centre for Children With Disabilities. A health clinic and a police station are also present to serve the community. As of 2017, there is a Major Road; completed under the APNU/AFC Government, that connects four of the aforementioned five Sections/'Fields' providing ease of transportation and reducing traffic congestion in the area.

== History ==
The area developed during 1986, when land previously used for the cultivation of rice and rearing of fish began to be occupied. The area was called "farmers field" since it was used mainly for farming. However, a few years later almost 400 persons had moved into the area. It was all swamp and mud when persons decided to use the area for housing. Even though settling on the land was considered illegal at the time, persons continued to occupy the land and by 1985–1991, bridges creating linkages to other sections east, now known as Liliendaal and Pattensen (south) were constructed.

The area became known as one of the largest squatting settlements, which caught the attention of law enforcement officials who started a campaign to restrict persons from expanding. However, zeal for development and property ownership coupled with predominantly vulnerable, low income women and men who needed land and a place to call home resulted in mobilization and lobbying by "squatters" for the regularization of the area. Persistence and determination resulted in the area becoming one of the largest squatting settlements in the country to be converted into a housing scheme.

While Sophia has benefited from some infrastructural development — limited paved roads, limited electricity supply — other basics public goods like potable water for households, a community-wide sewage system and regulated sanitation have been slowly addressed. There is no private sector presence in the community other than small neighbourhood businesses to provide services as part of its social responsibility. Even though faith-based organizations have a heavy presence in the community only a limited number of social services are provided by the group to the community.

== Declaration of Sophia ==
On 14 December 1974, a People's National Congress was held in Sophia where Forbes Burnham unveiled his plans for the future of Guyana. The speech was later published as the Declaration of Sophia. In the speech, Burnham stated that "the Party (PNC) should assume unapologetically its paramountcy over the government which is merely one of its executive arms." This included all institutions of state including the judiciary, therefore the PNC flag was flown over the Court of Appeal as a reminder.

Other key points of the Declaration were the ownership of the national resources by the people, the ending of exploitation by creating an egalitarian and classless society, and production for human need instead of profit.

The Declaration resulted in a nationalisation of Guyana's industry, the merger of Party and State. Party membership became important to obtain contracts, permits and benefits, and the Guyana National Service was created as a way to mobilize the youth into a paramilitary organisation controlled by the party.

== See also ==
- Squatting in Guyana
