= Ministry of Finance (Guyana) =

Government ministry of Guyana

Co-operative Republic of Guyana Ministry of Finance

Agency overview
- Headquarters: 49 Main and Urquhart Streets, Georgetown
- Agency executive: Ashni Singh, Minister of Finance
- Website: finance.gov.gy

The Ministry of Finance is the government ministry of Guyana responsible for fostering economic development by managing and maintaining public finances and providing a positive framework for public and private initiatives. The ministry is located in the capital city, Georgetown.

== List of ministers ==
The following is a list of finance ministers of Guyana.

- Charles Ramkissoon Jacob, September 1961 - December 1964
- Peter D'Aguiar, December 1964 - September 1967
- Ptolemy Reid, September 1967 - December 1970
- Hugh Desmond Hoyte, December 1970 - August 1972
- Frank E. Hope, August 1972 - 1980
- Hugh Desmond Hoyte, 1980 - 1983
- Carl Barrington Greenidge, 1983 - 1992
- Asgar Ally, 1992 - 1995
- Bharrat Jagdeo, 1995 - 1999
- Saisnarine Kowlessar, 1999 - 2006
- Ashni Singh, September 2006 - May 2015
- Winston Jordan, May 2015 - August 2020
- Bharrat Jagdeo, August 2020 - November 2020
- Ashni Singh, November 2020 -

== See also ==
- Politics of Guyana
- Ministry of Finance (Trinidad and Tobago)
- Ministry of Finance (Suriname)
- Ministry of Finance (Brazil)
