= Guyana Labour Party =

The Guyana Labour Party (GLP) was a political party in Guyana.

== History ==
The party was established in 1992 as a breakaway from the Guyanese Action for Reform and Democracy, holding its first meeting on 19 August. It did not run in the October 1992 elections, instead advising its supporters to vote for the People's Progressive Party.

The party did contest the 1997 general elections in an alliance with the Working People's Alliance, with the joint list winning a single seat.
