= Robeson Benn =

Guyanese politician (born 1953)

Brindley Robeson Benn
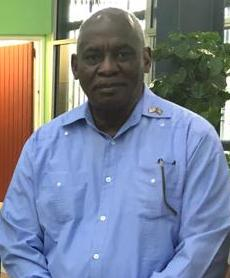
- Benn in 2022

Minister of Home Affairs, Guyana
- Incumbent
- Assumed office 5 August 2020

Personal details
- Born: 7 January 1953 (age 73) Georgetown, Guyana
- Occupation: Politician

Brindley Robeson Benn (born 7 January 1953) is a Guyanese politician. He was born in Georgetown, Guyana and is the current minister of home affairs for the government of Guyana. Benn was appointed minister in August 2020 by President Irfaan Ali.

His late father, Brindley Benn, was also a government minister and a key leader during the movement for Guyana's Independence.

== Education ==
Benn is a geologist. Benn attended college at Graham's Hall, Cummings Lodge and Queen's College. After that, he attended Freiberg University of Mining and Technology where he obtained a degree in geology.

He is married to Dina Sheridan Benn.

== Career ==
He began his career as a field assistant working for the Guyana Geology and Mines Commission. He was also Chairman-Guyana Geology and Mines Commission. Before his appointment as Minister, he was the Commissioner of the Guyana Geology and Mines Commission.

He was previously a Minister of Public Works.
