= Nigel Dharamlall =

Guyanese politician

Minister of Local Government and Regional Development
- In office 5 August 2020 – 5 July 2023

Member of Parliament
- In office 3 September 2020 – 5 July 2023

Personal details
- Party: People's Progressive Party (Guyana)

Nigel Deonarine Dharamlall, is Guyanese politician, who served as Minister of Local Government and Regional Development and Member of Parliament under President Irfaan Ali from 5 August 2020 to 5 July 2023.

== Controversies ==
Dharamlall resigned from both positions subsequent to his arrest in connection with an investigation into allegations of rape of an indigenous girl.

He has remained in the public domain both as a member of the governing People's Progressive Party and social media activist.

In May 2024, he was accused of sexual assault by another woman.
