= Saisnarine Kowlessar =

Guyanese politician

Minister of Finance
- In office 1999–2006
- Preceded by: Bharrat Jagdeo
- Succeeded by: Ashni Singh

Saisnarine Kowlessar is a Guyanese politician. He served as Minister of Finance from 1999 to 2006. He previously also lectured at the University of Guyana.

In 2018, Kowlessar was arrested and released on bail for "to turn up at that law enforcement arm of the Guyana Police Force" related to the sale of lands held by the National Industrial and Commercial Investments Limited.

In December 2020, he became chairman of the Guyana Revenue Authority.

Political offices
Preceded by Bharrat Jagdeo	Minister of Finance; 1999–2006	Succeeded by Ashni Singh
