= God Bless Guyana =

God Bless Guyana (GBG) was a political party in Guyana led by Hardat Persaud. Its symbol was a dove carrying a wheat straw.

== History ==
The party contested the 1997 general elections, but received only 314 votes and failed to win a seat. It attempted to register to run in the 2001 elections, but was disqualified by the Guyana Elections Commission.
