= Guyana Democratic Party =

The Guyana Democratic Party was a political party in Guyana.

== History ==
The party was established by Asgar Ally in 1996. In the general elections the following year it received 0.6% of the vote and failed to win a seat. In 2000 it merged into the National Front Alliance but later withdrew. In the 2001 elections its share of the vote fell to 0.3% and it remained without parliamentary representation.
