= 1973 Guyanese general election =

← 1968	17 July 1973	1980 →

53 seats in the National Assembly 27 seats needed for a majority
- Registered: 431,575
- Turnout: 81.00%
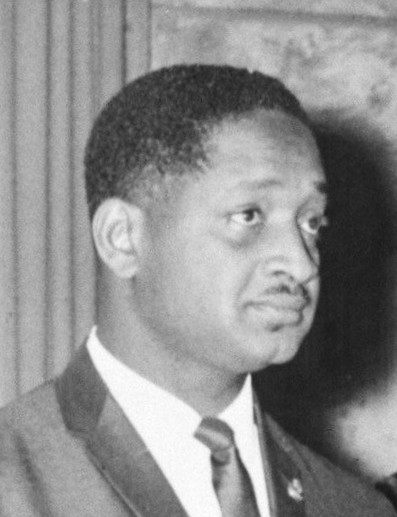

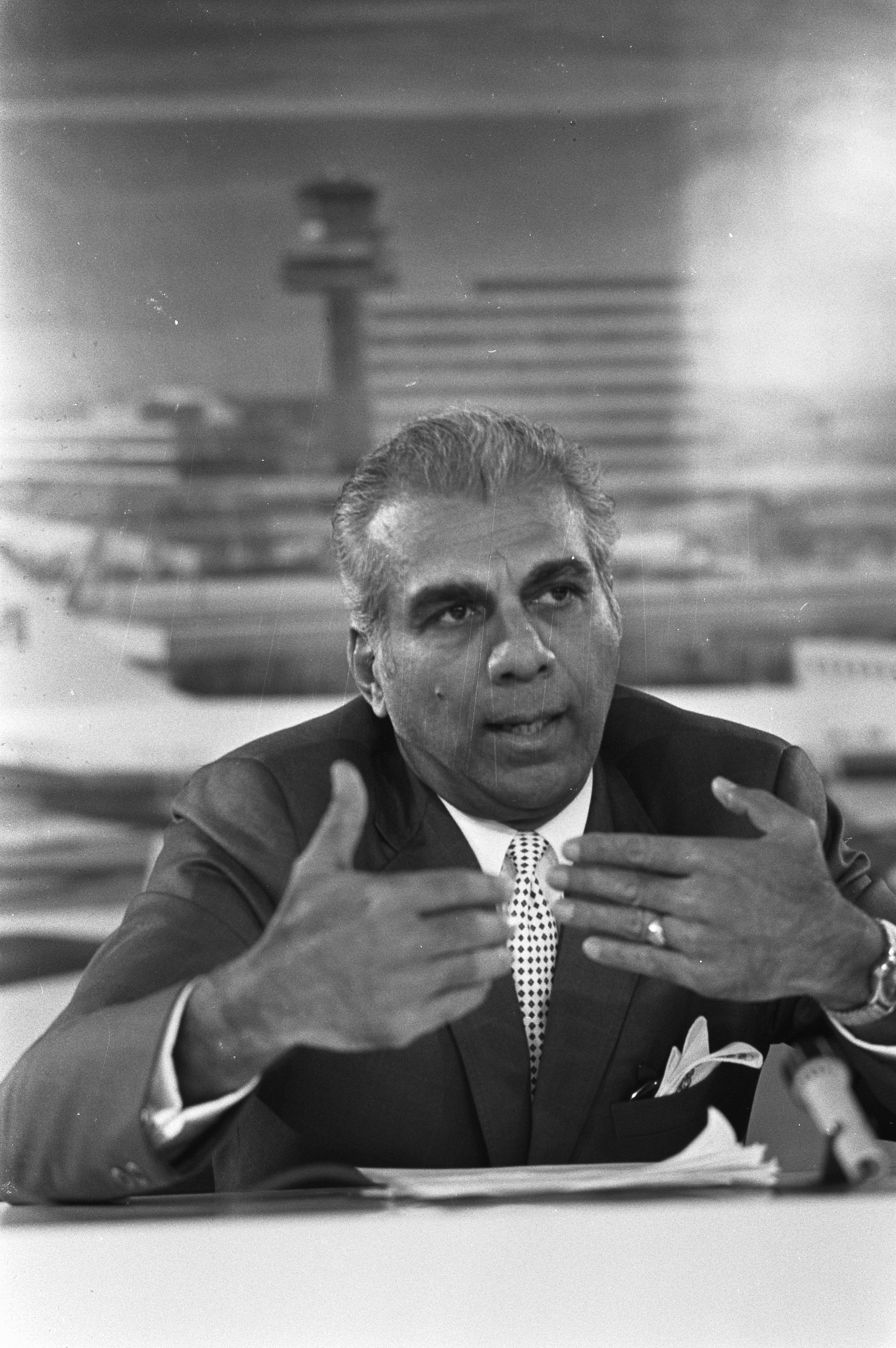

	First party	Second party	Third party
Leader	Forbes Burnham	Cheddi Jagan	Marcellus Fielden Singh
Party	PNC	PPP	LP–TUF
Seats won	37	14	2
Seat change	▲7	▼5	▼2
Popular vote	243,803	92,374	9,580
Percentage	70.10%	26.56%	2.75%
Swing	▲14.29pp	▼9.93pp	▼4.66pp
Prime Minister before election
Forbes Burnham
PNC
Elected Prime Minister
Forbes Burnham
PNC

General elections were held in Guyana on 17 July 1973. The result was a victory for the People's National Congress, which won 37 of the 53 seats. However, the PNC's victory was the result of fraud as the government had direct control of the elections. Voter turnout was 81.0%.

== Electoral system ==
The National Assembly had 53 members, elected by proportional representation in a nationwide constituency.

This was the last election in Guyana where the entire National Assembly was elected by direct popular vote until 2001, as a new constitution adopted in 1980 provided for an expanded Assembly of 65 members: 53 elected under the old system, ten appointed by the regional councils created by the 1980 constitution (to be elected at the same date as the National Assembly), and two by the National Congress of Local Democratic Organs (an umbrella body representing these regional councils, also created by the 1980 constitution).

== Results ==
Party	Votes	%	Seats	+/–
People's National Congress	243,803	70.10	37	+7
People's Progressive Party	92,374	26.56	14	–5
Liberator Party–United Force	9,580	2.75	2	–2
People's Democratic Movement	2,053	0.59	0	New
Total	347,810	100.00	53	0
Valid votes	347,810	99.49		
Invalid/blank votes	1,780	0.51		
Total votes	349,590	100.00		
Registered voters/turnout	431,575	81.00		
Source: Nohlen
