= African Society for Cultural Relations with Independent Africa =

Afro-Guyanese grassroots organization in Guyana

African Society for Cultural Relations with Independent Africa (abbr. ASCRIA) was an Afro-Guyanese grassroots organization in Guyana, to emerge soon after the country's independence from British rule. Dedicated to the revitalization of African culture in the Caribbean country, the organization was a significant political and economic factor in the early 1970s, the Pan-Africanist organization was founded in the 1960s by Eusi Kwayana as a successor organization of Black separatist African Society for Racial Equality (ASRE). During the 1960s and until 1971, ASCRIA was an influential force in Guyana's post-independence politics, as both a competitor and an ally of Forbes Burnham's governing People's National Congress (PNC). After breaking with the PNC and altogether with Black Nationalism, in 1974 it merged into the Working People's Alliance.

== History ==
The organization's predecessor, Black separatist ASRE had previously sought for partitioning Guyana into three sectors: one for Africans, one for East Indians, and one for a voluntarily mixed population, an approach that however failed to sufficiently gain traction. ASCRIA drew in additional supporters from the League of Coloured Peoples. Requiring members to attend a six-month course in African studies based in the capital Georgetown, to attain the proper black awareness, active membership was estimated to exceed 2,000 in 1970. By 1971, the organization dominated African bauxite workers in the Mackenzie township. In this period, Kwayana served as a close advisor to Prime Minister Forbes Burnham, to the point that ASCRIA was considered the cultural and economic arm of the People's National Congress government.

The organization however broke ties with the PNC in 1971, mainly because on the issue of government corruption, forcing the PNC to adopt a stauncher Black Nationalist course, while also igniting an oppositional, working-class movement across the ethnic lines. ASCRIA itself initiated joint activities with Moses Bhagwan's pan-Indian Indian People's Revolutionary Associates (IPRA). The two groups came out to form the core of the nascent multiethnic pro-democracy movement. In 1974 ASCRIA and IPRA joined forces with the Maoist Working People's Vanguard Party and students groups Ratoon and Movement Against Oppression to form the Working People's Alliance.
