= Donald Ramotar =

President of Guyana from 2011 to 2015

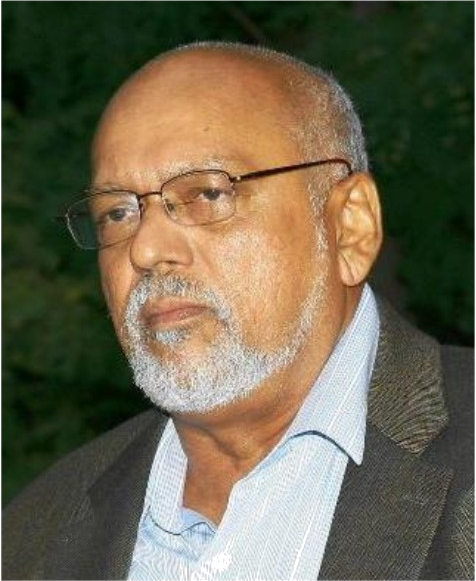

8th President of Guyana
- In office 3 December 2011 – 16 May 2015
- Prime Minister (also First Vice President): Sam Hinds
- Preceded by: Bharrat Jagdeo
- Succeeded by: David Granger

Personal details
- Born: 22 October 1950 (age 75) Caria Caria, British Guiana
- Party: People's Progressive Party
- Spouse: Deolatchmee Ramotar (m. 1974)
- Children: Three
- Education: University of Guyana

Donald Rabindranauth Ramotar (born 22 October 1950) is a Guyanese politician who was President of Guyana from 2011 to 2015. He was also the General Secretary of the People's Progressive Party (PPP) from 1997 to 2013.

== Political career ==
Ramotar joined the PPP in 1967 and was first elected to the PPP Central Committee in 1979; he joined the PPP Executive Committee in 1983. He received a certificate from the Government Technical Institute (GTI) in welding. From 1988 to 1993, he was International Secretary of the Guyana Agricultural Workers' Union. In the 1992 election, in which the PPP under Cheddi Jagan won power for first time in decades, Ramotar was elected to the National Assembly of Guyana; he was continuously re-elected thereafter. He was designated as the PPP's Executive Secretary in 1993. Following Jagan's death in March 1997, Ramotar was unanimously elected to succeed him as the PPP's General Secretary on March 29, 1997.

At the PPP's 29th Congress, he was re-elected to its Central Committee on August 2, 2008, receiving the fourth-highest number of votes (637). Following the Congress, he was re-elected by the Central Committee as General Secretary on August 12, 2008, without opposition; he was also elected to the editorial board of the PPP paper Thunder on this occasion.

On 4 April 2011, the PPP Central Committee chose Ramotar as the party's presidential candidate for the November 2011 election. On April 4, the Central Committee of the ruling People’s Progressive Party announced a unanimous selection of Ramotar, the PPP front-runner. There was considerable debate over the selection, as it was made by open vote and not a secret ballot, and Ralph Ramkarran, one of the other contenders, posted an ad in the Stabroek Times in opposition to the open vote.

The government announced on 28 April 2011 that Ramotar had been appointed to the post of Political Adviser to President Bharrat Jagdeo; previously Ramotar had held no official position in the administration. The opposition criticized the appointment; it argued that the government was merely reacting to criticism that it effectively sponsored Ramotar's candidacy by including him on official trips, and therefore, was giving him an official job in order to legitimize the situation. The government argued that Ramotar's inclusion on official trips was acceptable because the government was implementing the policies of the ruling party, led by Ramotar.

The election was held on 28 November 2011, and he was declared the winner when results were announced on 1 December. However, the PPP fell one seat short of a parliamentary majority, winning 32 out of 65 seats, meaning that Ramotar would serve as President while two opposition parties would together hold a majority of seats in the National Assembly. Ramotar expressed disappointment with his party's failure to win a majority, but he said that "the electorate has spoken and we have to work with what we have". He was sworn in as President on 3 December 2011.

During his first two years as President, Ramotar remained in his post as General Secretary of the PPP, but eventually he stepped aside from the party leadership, citing the heavy workload. The PPP Central Committee elected Clement Rohee to succeed Ramotar as General Secretary on 19 August 2013; Ramotar nominated Rohee for the post.

Ramotar said that Bashar al-Assad's win in the 2014 Syrian presidential election was a great victory for Syria.

Donald Ramotar and the PPP lost the 11 May 2015 general election to the opposition APNU – AFC coalition led by David A. Granger, which won by a slim margin. President Ramotar left office on 16 May 2015, when Granger was sworn in. Ramotar was not included in the list of the PPP's 32 MPs in July 2015.

In 2024, 9 years after he left office as President, Ramotar returned to active politics after being elected to the PPP's central committee.

== Awards and honours ==
Year	Country	Ribbon	Award	Given by	Field of Merit
2015	India		Pravasi Bharatiya Samman	President of India	Public affairs

He was awarded the Pravasi Bharatiya Samman by Prime Minister of India Narendra Modi at the annual Pravasi Bharatiya Divas of January 2015 held in Gandhinagar, India.

Political offices
Preceded by Bharrat Jagdeo	President of Guyana; 2011–2015	Succeeded by David Granger
