= Progressive Youth Organisation of Guyana =

Indo-Guyanese youth political organization

The Progressive Youth Organisation of Guyana is a youth organisation in Guyana, the youth wing of the People's Progressive Party. The membership of Progressive Youth Organisation (PYO) is predominantly Indo-Guyanese, like its mother party.

== History ==
The organisation was established in 1952, through a decision at the second party congress of PPP. The name of the organisation at the time of its founding was the Pioneer Youth League of British Guiana. Brindley Benn was the secretary of the organisation. In February 1953, the Pioneer Youth League became an affiliate of the World Federation of Democratic Youth. The Pioneer Youth League was banned by the British colonial authorities on December 15, 1953.

In the early 1960s a split emerged in the PPP as Benn and others from the PYO led a black leftist revolt against the party leadership. The young ideologues of PYO resisted the increasing Indo-Guyanese dominance of the party. During the 1960s PYO developed a self-defence structure, as Guyanese politics became more violent. At the same time the Indo-Guyanese sector of PYO became more dominant within the organisation. In 1964, during the four-month-long strike by the Guyana Agricultural Workers Union (the PPP-aligned sugarcane workers' union) the PYO repeatedly clashed with the rival Young Socialist Movement. Neville Annibourne was the PYO secretary at the time. By 1962, 87.1% of PYO members were Indo-Guyanese. As of 1963, PYO had 92 branches with 813 members. Moreover the organisation had around 3,000 sympathizers.

PYO organised different sporting and cultural activities, and built up libraries in many communities.

The Student Council of the Progressive Youth Organisation was previously a member organisation of the International Union of Students. Through the PYO, scholarships for Guyanese students for studies in the Socialist Bloc were distributed.
