= Central High School, Guyana =

Central High School

Location
- Georgetown; Guyana
- Coordinates: 6.80657°N 58.16447°W

Information
- Type: Private primary and secondary school
- Established: 1927; 99 years ago
- School district: Region 4

Central High School was founded in Georgetown, Guyana, in 1927 by Joseph Clement Luck, and became the largest private educational establishment in the country, providing both primary and secondary education.

In September 2019, it was announced that Central High was being merged with St. Mary's High School, to become "The New Central High School". However, this was subsequently explained as a temporary merger that was being taken because of issues connected with the condition of the school's former building, and reassurances were given by the Regional Education Officer that the school's current "A"-grade status would be retained while phasing out St Mary's High School.

== Notable alumni ==
- Brindley Benn
- Hilton Cheong-Leen
- Tommy Eytle
- Dawn Hastings-Williams
- Roy A. K. Heath
- Ralph Ramkarran
- Doris Rogers
- Doodnauth Singh

== See also ==
List of schools in Guyana
