= 1968 Guyanese general election =

← 1964	16 December 1968	1973 →

53 seats in the National Assembly 27 seats needed for a majority
- Registered: 369,088
- Turnout: 85.14%
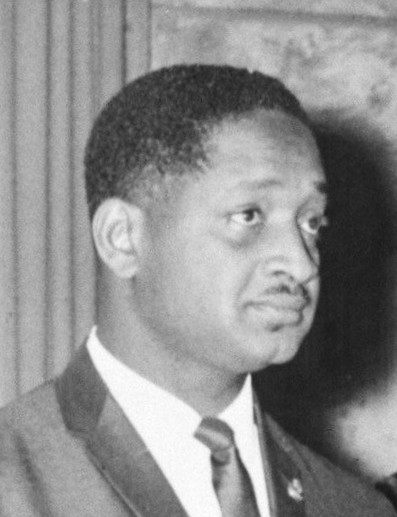

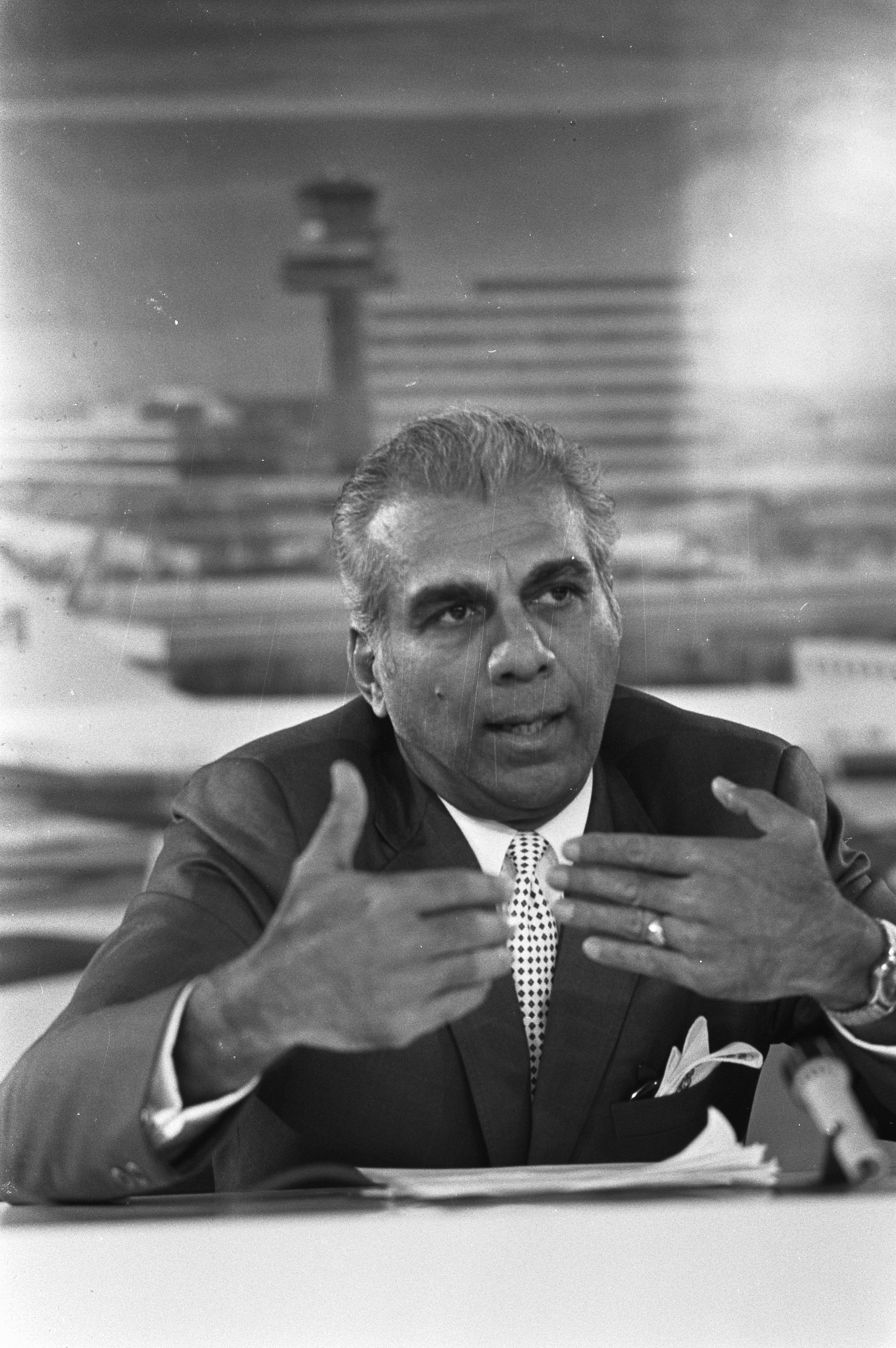

	First party	Second party	Third party
Leader	Forbes Burnham	Cheddi Jagan	Peter D'Aguiar
Party	PNC	PPP	TUF
Leader since	13 February 1955	1 January 1950	5 October 1960
Seats won	30	19	4
Seat change	▲8	▼5	▼3
Popular vote	174,339	113,991	23,162
Percentage	55.81%	36.49%	7.41%
Swing	▲9.97pp	▼4.03pp	▼5.00pp
Prime Minister before election
Forbes Burnham
PNC
Elected Prime Minister
Forbes Burnham
PNC

General elections were held in Guyana on 16 December 1968. The result was a victory for the People's National Congress, which won 30 of the 53 seats, although the PNC's victory was the result of fraud as the government had direct control of the elections. Voter turnout was 85.1%.

== Election fraud ==
The electoral fraud of Forbes Burnham was the subject of two documentaries produced by Granada Television, The Trail of the Vanishing Voters which aired on 9 December 1968, and The Making of a Prime Minister which appeared in January 1969. The documentaries featured the main opposition figures, Cheddi Jagan and Peter D'Aguiar.

== Results ==
Party	Votes	%	Seats	+/–
People's National Congress	174,339	55.81	30	+8
People's Progressive Party	113,991	36.49	19	–5
United Force	23,162	7.41	4	–3
Guiana United Muslim Party	899	0.29	0	0
Total	312,391	100.00	53	0
Valid votes	312,391	99.41		
Invalid/blank votes	1,855	0.59		
Total votes	314,246	100.00		
Registered voters/turnout	369,088	85.14		
Source: Nohlen
