= Democratic Labour Movement =

Political party in Guyana

The Democratic Labour Movement (DLM) was a political party in Guyana.

== History ==
The party was established in 1982, In the 1985 general elections it received only 0.7% of the vote and failed to win a seat. Following the elections, it joined the Patriotic Coalition for Democracy, an alliance of five parties calling for free and fair elections. This was achieved in 1992, but the DLM saw its share of the vote fall to 0.5% and it remained without parliamentary representation. The party did not contest any further elections.
