= Catherine Andrea Hughes =

Guyanese politician

Catherine Andrea Hughes is a Guyanese politician from the Alliance for Change. In the 2020 general election, she was elected to the National Assembly representing the IV-Demerara-Mahaica district.
