= Asgar Ally =

Guyanese politician

Minister of Finance
- In office 1992–1995
- President: Cheddi Jagan
- Preceded by: Carl Barrington Greenidge
- Succeeded by: Bharrat Jagdeo

Asgar Ally is a former Guyanese politician. He served as Minister of Finance from 1992 to 1995.

He was deputy governor of the Bank of Jamaica prior to returning to Guyana to serve as minister of finance.

He resigned as minister of finance in May 1995 over "political and policy differences" with President Jagan.

Soon after, Ally founded the Guyana Democratic Party, and in July 1996 announced that he would run for president in the 1997 elections. He ran with a coalition of Guyanese Action for Reform and Democracy (GUARD) and the Guyana Labour Party (GLP), but it disbanded after the election.

Ally re-aligned with Jagan and the PPP/C joining again to pledge his support during the 2011 elections.
