= Green Launching Pad =

The Green Launching Pad is a public-private collaborative program developed between the University of New Hampshire and the New Hampshire Office of Energy and Planning and funded by the United States Department of Energy under the American Recovery and Reinvestment Act of 2009. There are numerous goals of the initiative associated with entrepreneurial venture acceleration for individuals and businesses operating in New Hampshire to reduce environmental degradation and improve economic outlook through the creation of novel, purposeful businesses which will offer employment opportunities as they grow. The program also considers the State Energy Program and the NH Climate Action Plan in choosing which companies to endorse. From February 2010 until August 2012, the program has held three competitive rounds where entrepreneurs from around the state vied for capital rewards up to $90,000 as well as access to professional business consultants and other, community-related forms of support.

The idea was conceived and made reality through the minds of two University of New Hampshire business professors, local businessmen, and key figures from the State of New Hampshire, including Governor John Lynch. As of August 2012, the program has helped with the establishment and development of 14 companies while providing educational and networking opportunities that have impacted more than 450 event and seminar attendees. In addition to these direct successes, the program provided invaluable internship opportunities for students of various backgrounds at the University of New Hampshire; employing more than ten different students in two years.

== GLP 1.0, 2.0, and 2.5 ==
Green Launching Pad has sent out three rounds of Requests for Proposals in about two and a half years (as of August 2012). The organization has referred to these competitive rounds as GLP 1.0, 2.0, and 2.5. There will likely be further rounds of funding for environmentally conscious entrepreneurs in coming years, as the program manager looks for alternative capital pools.

=== GLP 1.0 ===
GLP 1.0 was the first competition which led to the Green Launching Pad selecting five companies out of more than 70 to receive funding and support. The GLP 1.0 companies are:

- Air Power Analytics - A turnkey platform for metering, measuring, and analyzing industrial compressed air systems.
- Enertrac, Inc. - An improved, low-cost, remote monitoring system of residential fuel storage used to maximize delivery service efficiency; utilizing a technology with several other applications in development.
- Green Clean Heat, LLC - Wood-fired heating systems for commercial, municipal, and industrial systems.
- Innovacene - High-performing organic semiconductors for alternative energy applications.
- Revolution Energy, LLC - A clean, renewable energy financing, maintenance, and logistics firm implementing solar technology projects throughout New England.

=== GLP 2.0 ===
The second run of the program, GLP 2.0, occurred in April 2011 and featured NH Governor John Lynch, U.S. Secretary of Energy Steven Chu, and University of New Hampshire President Mark Huddleston. There were six companies that received GLP support out of 50 applicants:

- Sustainx, Inc. - Non-toxic, low-cost energy storage for use with renewable energy systems.
- Blue2Green, LLC - Promoting and enacting the restoration of dams and mills for the purpose of hydroelectric power generation as well as increasing popularity in such projects.
- Holase, Inc. - Rugged, transportable, solar-powered traffic lights to be used in emergency situations and underdeveloped global regions.
- New England Footwear, LLC - Sustainable, environmentally friendly footwear manufacturing which aims to increase local manufacturing practices.
- Therma-Hexx, LLC - Manufacturing and installations of low-cost solar collector and heat exchange system with varied applications.
- Walker Wellington, LLC - Production of off-grid renewable energy through a hydrokinetic turbine power generation system.

=== GLP 2.5 ===
The theme of GLP 2.5 was Green Manufacturing which focuses on innovative operational methodologies in product development to reduce environmental impact through such functions. There were three companies selected out of six finalists and numerous applicants:

- LDI Corporation - Responsible manufacturing of safe textiles for use by hospitals.
- RAS Tech, LLC - Material creation through processing recycled asphalt shingles.
- EcoMovement - Facilitation of community composting and gardening on residential and small-business scales.
