= 2001 Guyanese general election =

- 19 March 2001

All 65 seats in the National Assembly 33 seats needed for a majority
- Registered: 440,185
- Turnout: 91.72% (▲3.30pp)
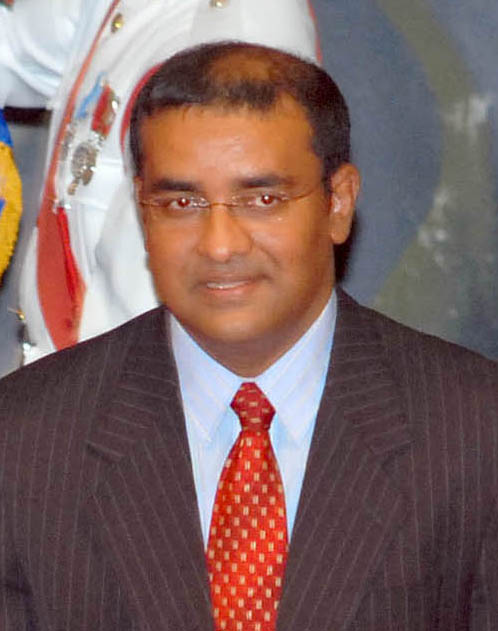

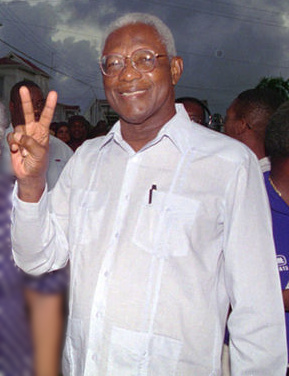

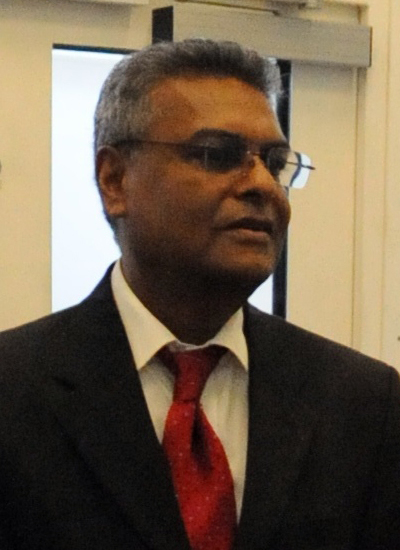
| | First party | Second party | Third party |
|---|---|---|---|
| Candidate | Bharrat Jagdeo | Desmond Hoyte | Paul Hardy |
| Party | PPP/C | PNC/R | GAP–WPA |
| Last election | 55.26%, 34 seats | 40.55%, 26 seats | 1.20%, 1 seat |
| Seats won | 34 | 27 | 2 |
| Seat change | Steady | ▲1 | Steady |
| Popular vote | 220,667 | 165,866 | 9,451 |
| Percentage | 52.96% | 41.83% | 2.38% |
| Swing | ▼2.30pp | ▲1.28pp | ▲1.18pp |
| | Fourth party | Fifth party |
| Candidate | Ravi Dev | Manzoor Nadir |
| Party | ROAR | TUF |
| Last election | Did not exist | Did not exist |
| Seats won | 1 | 1 |
| Seat change | New | Steady |
| Popular vote | 3,695 | 2,904 |
| Percentage | 0.93% | 0.73% |
| Swing | New | ▼0.76pp |
- Results by district
President before election
Bharrat Jagdeo
PPP/C
Elected President
Bharrat Jagdeo
PPP/C

General elections were held in Guyana on 19 March 2001. The result was a victory for the People's Progressive Party/Civic, which won 34 of the 65 seats. Voter turnout was 91.7%.

== Electoral system ==
Under the new electoral law adopted in February 2001, the 65 members of the National Assembly were elected by closed list proportional representation in two groups; 25 members were elected from the 10 electoral districts based on the regions, and 40 elected from a single nationwide constituency. Seats were allocated using the Hare quota. The pre-2001 arrangement under which 10 seats appointed by the Regional Councils and 2 by the National Congress of Local Democratic Organs (an umbrella body representing the regional councils) was abolished, and thus the entire National Assembly was elected by direct popular vote for the first time since 1973, although all elections from 1968 to 1985 were fraudulent.

The President was elected by a first-past-the-post double simultaneous vote system, whereby each list nominated a presidential candidate and the presidential election itself was won by the candidate of the list having a plurality.

== Results ==
| Party | Presidential candidate | Votes | % | Seats | | | |
| Party | Presidential candidate | Votes | % | Constituency | Top-up | Total | +/– |
|---|---|---|---|---|---|---|---|
| People's Progressive Party/Civic | Bharrat Jagdeo | 210,013 | 52.96 | 12 | 22 | 34 | +5 |
| People's National Congress/Reform | Desmond Hoyte | 165,866 | 41.83 | 12 | 15 | 27 | +5 |
| Guyana Action Party–Working People's Alliance | Paul Hardy | 9,451 | 2.38 | 1 | 1 | 2 | +1 |
| Rise Organise and Rebuild Guyana | Ravi Dev | 3,695 | 0.93 | 0 | 1 | 1 | New |
| The United Force | Manzoor Nadir | 2,904 | 0.73 | 0 | 1 | 1 | 0 |
| Justice for All Party | Chandra N. Sharma | 2,825 | 0.71 | 0 | 0 | 0 | 0 |
| Guyana Democratic Party | Asgar Ally | 1,345 | 0.34 | 0 | 0 | 0 | 0 |
| National Front Alliance | Keith Scott | 417 | 0.11 | 0 | 0 | 0 | New |
| Total | | 396,516 | 100.00 | 25 | 40 | 65 | 0 |
| Valid votes | | 396,516 | 98.21 | | | | |
| Invalid/blank votes | | 7,218 | 1.79 | | | | |
| Total votes | | 403,734 | 100.00 | | | | |
| Registered voters/turnout | | 440,185 | 91.72 | | | | |
Source: Psephos, Election Passport, Carter Center
