= Guyana Action Party =

Political party in Guyana

- Abbreviation: GAP
- Leader: Vincent Henry
- Founded: January 1989
- Ideology: Indigenism; Socialism
- National affiliation: WPA (2001); ROAR (2006); APNU (2011)

The Guyana Action Party (GAP) is a left-wing political party in Guyana representing the indigenous Amerindian population.

== History ==
The GAP was established in January 1989 as Guyanese Action for Reform and Democracy (GUARD). It contested national elections for the first time in 2001, when it formed an alliance with the Working People's Alliance; the alliance received 2.4% of the popular vote, winning 2 of the 65 seats in the National Assembly.

The party allied with Rise Organise and Rebuild Guyana for the 2006 elections, with the combined list winning a single seat. In 2011 the party joined the A Partnership for National Unity alliance in the build-up to the elections that year.
