= 1985 Guyanese general election =

- 9 December 1985

53 of the 65 seats in the National Assembly 27 seats needed for a majority
- Registered: 399,304
- Turnout: 73.83% (▼8.48pp)
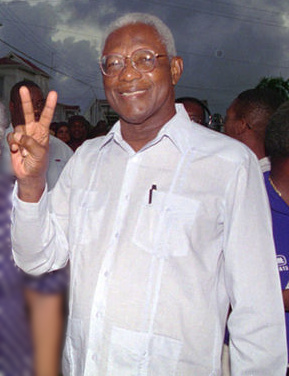

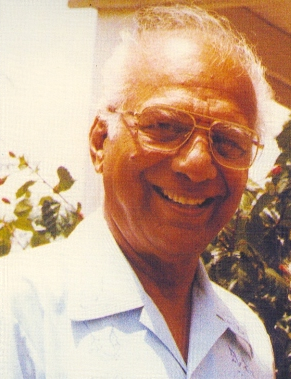

	First party	Second party	Third party
Leader	Desmond Hoyte	Cheddi Jagan	Marcellus Fielden Singh
Party	PNC	PPP	TUF
Leader since	6 August 1985	1 January 1950	January 1969
Last election	77.66%, 53 seats	19.46%, 10 seats	2.88%, 2 seats
Seats won	42	8	2
Seat change	▲1	▼2	Steady
Popular vote	228,718	45,926	9,820
Percentage	78.54%	15.77%	3.37%
Swing	▲0.88pp	▼3.69pp	▲0.49pp
- Results by district
President before election
Desmond Hoyte
PNC
Elected President
Desmond Hoyte
PNC

General elections were held in Guyana on 9 December 1985. The result was a victory for the People's National Congress, which won 42 of the 53 directly-elected seats. However, the elections were marred by fraud and the People's Progressive Party and Working People's Alliance withdrew on election day. Voter turnout was 73.8%.

== Electoral system ==
The National Assembly had 65 members; 53 elected by proportional representation in a nationwide constituency, 10 appointed by the Regional Councils elected on the same date as the national members, and 2 appointed by the National Congress of Local Democratic Organs, an umbrella body representing the regional councils.

The President was elected by a first-past-the-post double simultaneous vote system, whereby each list nominated a presidential candidate and the candidate heading the list that received the most votes was elected president.

== Results ==
Party	Votes	%	Seats				
Party	Votes	%	Elected	Regional appointees	NCLDO appointees	Total	+/–
People's National Congress	228,718	78.54	42	10	2	54	+1
People's Progressive Party	45,926	15.77	8	0	0	8	–2
United Force	9,820	3.37	2	0	0	2	0
Working People's Alliance	4,176	1.43	1	0	0	1	New
Democratic Labour Movement	2,167	0.74	0	0	0	0	New
People's Democratic Movement	232	0.08	0	0	0	0	New
National Democratic Front	156	0.05	0	0	0	0	New
Total	291,195	100.00	53	10	2	65	0
Valid votes	291,195	98.78					
Invalid/blank votes	3,606	1.22					
Total votes	294,801	100.00					
Registered voters/turnout	399,304	73.83					
Source: Nohlen, IPU, Guyana News and Information
