= Liberator Party =

Political party in Guyana

The Liberator Party was a right-wing political party in Guyana.

== History ==
The party was established in 1972 as a split from the United Force (TUF), and was led by Fielden Singh, who had been leader of the TUF until being suspended. Despite the split, it ran in alliance with TUF in the 1973 general elections, receiving 2.8% of the vote and won two seats. However, the Liberator Party decided to boycott the National Assembly in protest at fraud in the elections and both seats were taken by the United Force.

The party did not contest any further elections, and joined with the Working People's Vanguard Party in 1980 to form the Vanguard for Liberation and Democracy alliance. The party was disbanded in 1984 when its leader retired from politics.
