= Khemraj Ramjattan =

Guyanese politician (born 1960)

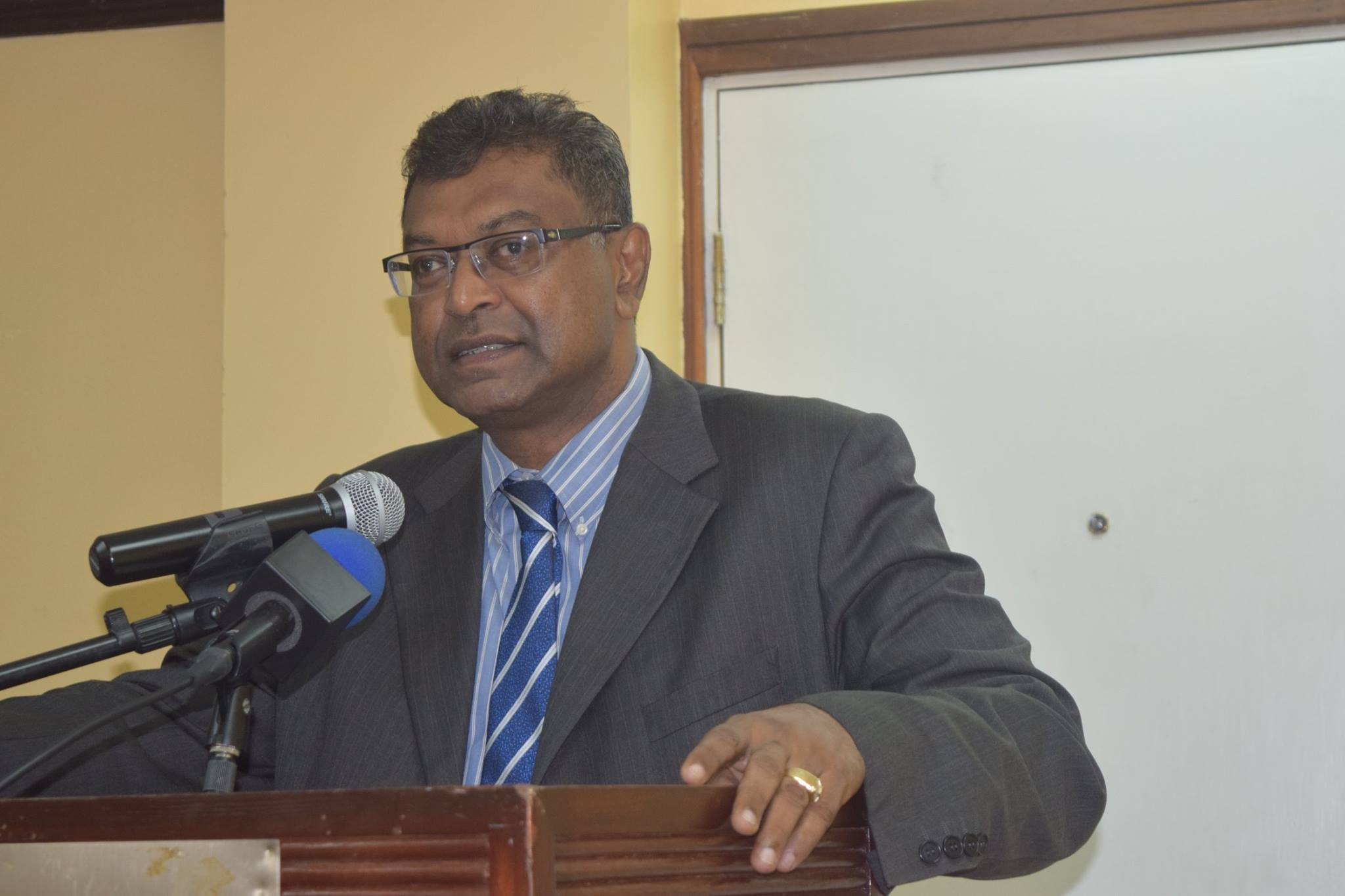
- Ramjattan in 2015

Minister of Public Security
- In office May 2015 – August 2020
- President: David A. Granger

Personal details
- Born: 12 October 1960 (age 65) No. 48 Village, East Berbice-Corentyne, British Guiana
- Party: Alliance For Change (AFC)
- Other political affiliations: People's Progressive Party (until 2005)
- Spouse: Sita Ramjattan
- Children: 2
- Education: University of the West Indies, Cave Hill; Hugh Wooding Law School

Khemraj Ramjattan (born 12 October 1960) is a Guyanese politician and one of the founders of Alliance for Change.

From May 2015 to August 2020, he served as Minister of Public Security and one of the vice presidents in the cabinet of David A. Granger.

Ramjattan was born in No. 48 Village, East Berbice-Corentyne. He is an attorney-at-law, and has degrees from University of the West Indies at Cave Hill and Hugh Wooding Law School. He was elected to the National Assembly of Guyana in 1992 when he was a member of People's Progressive Party.
