= Working People's Alliance =

Political party in Guyana

- Abbreviation: WPA
- Executive member: David Hinds
- Founded: November 1974
- Ideology: Democratic socialism Marxism
- Political position: Left-wing
- Colors: Red

The Working People's Alliance is a democratic socialist political party in Guyana. It was a consultative member of Socialist International until 2005.

== History ==
The WPA was established in 1974, as an alliance of the Working People's Vanguard Party, the African Society for Cultural Relations with Independent Africa (ASCRIA), the Indian Political Revolutionary Associates and Ratoon, and became a political party in 1979. It was informally led by Walter Rodney until his assassination in June 1980. Then it was led by Rupert Roopnaraine and Eusi Kwayana. It did not run in the 1980 elections, but put forward candidates for the 1985 elections. Although it pulled out of the elections on election day, it still received 1.4% of the vote and won a single seat. In the 1992 elections, it increased its share of the vote to 2.0% and retained its seat in the National Assembly. For the 1997 elections, it formed an alliance with the Guyana Labour Party named the Alliance for Guyana. Although the alliance's share of the vote dropped to 1.2%, it won one seat.

In the 2001 elections, the WPA allied with the Guyana Action Party, receiving 2.4% of the vote and two seats. The party did not contest the 2006 elections, although one of its members ran as part of the Alliance for Change. In the 2011 elections it was part of the Partnership for National Unity alliance, which won 26 seats. Prior to the 2015 elections, the APNU formed a joint electoral list with the Alliance for Change. The combined list won 33 seats, allowing APNU leader David A. Granger to become President.
