= David A. Granger =

President of Guyana from 2015 to 2020

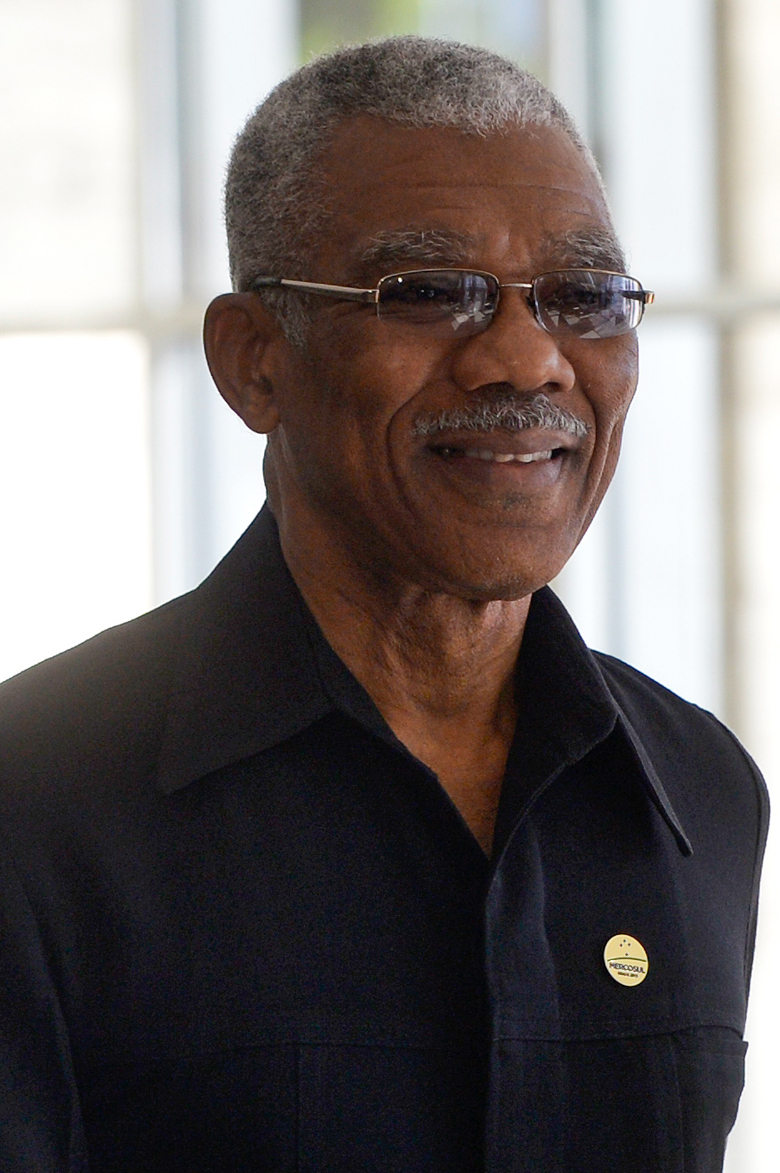
- Granger in 2015

9th President of Guyana
- In office 16 May 2015 – 2 August 2020
- Vice President: Carl Barrington Greenidge; Khemraj Ramjattan; Sydney Allicock
- Prime Minister (also First Vice President): Moses Nagamootoo
- Preceded by: Donald Ramotar
- Succeeded by: Irfaan Ali

Leader of the Opposition of Guyana
- In office July 2012 – 16 May 2015
- Preceded by: Robert Corbin
- Succeeded by: Bharrat Jagdeo

Personal details
- Born: David Arthur Granger; 15 July 1945 (age 81) Georgetown, British Guiana
- Party: People's National Congress
- Other political affiliations: A Partnership for National Unity
- Spouse: Sandra Chan-A-Sue (m. 1970)
- Children: 2

Military service
- Allegiance: Guyana
- Years of service: 1967–1992
- Rank: Brigadier

David Arthur Granger (born 15 July 1945) is a Guyanese former politician and retired military officer who served as the ninth president of Guyana from 2015 to 2020. A member of the People’s National Congress (PNC), he previously served as Commander of the Guyana Defence Force and as National Security Adviser from 1990 to 1992. He was leader of the Opposition in the National Assembly of Guyana from 2012 to 2015.

Granger stood as the opposition coalition's presidential candidate in the November 2011 general election but was defeated. He was elected as President in the May 2015 general election. He lost a vote of confidence on 21 December 2018 that led to a snap election.

== Career ==
Born in Georgetown, David Arthur Granger became a senior officer of the Guyana Defence Force (GDF) during the reign of Prime Minister Forbes Burnham. Granger attended Queen's College, one of Guyana's most prestigious schools, along the likes of Presidents Forbes Burnham, Cheddi Jagan, Samuel Hinds and scholars Walter Rodney and Rupert Roopnaraine.

After leaving Queen's College, where he was a member of the Queen's College Cadet Corps, Granger joined the Guyana Defence Force as an officer cadet in 1965 and was commissioned as a Second Lieutenant in 1966.

He received his professional military training at the Army Command and Staff College in Nigeria; the Jungle Warfare Instruction Centre in Brazil; and the School of Infantry and the Mons Officer Cadet School, respectively, in the UK.

He became commander of the Guyana Defence Force in 1979 and was promoted to the rank of brigadier. In 1990, Granger was appointed as National Security Adviser to the President and retired from the military service in 1992.

Granger founded the Guyana Review news magazine in 1992 and served as its Managing Editor. He has researched and published essays on military, historical and media themes, and is also the author of Guyana's State Media: the quest for control, and A Preliminary Study of Women Soldiers in the Anglophone Caribbean. For the 1995–1996 academic year he was a Hubert H. Humphrey/Fulbright Fellow at the Philip Merrill College of Journalism at the University of Maryland, College Park.

In 2010, he made a successful bid to be elected as the presidential candidate of the People's National Congress–Reform for the November 2011 general election.

Standing as the opposition coalition's presidential candidate, Granger was defeated by Donald Ramotar. He was unanimously elected as Leader of the Opposition in the National Assembly on 16 January 2012.

Granger stood again as the presidential candidate of the opposition coalition, APNU – AFC, in the 11 May 2015 general election. The coalition secured the majority of votes, and Granger was sworn in as President of Guyana on 16 May 2015, ending 23 years of PPP rule.

=== 2020 Elections ===
After Granger lost a vote of no confidence on 21 December 2018, a snap election was held on 2 March 2020. The elections were overseen by many international entities such as the Organisation of American States, Carter Center, CARICOM and European Union. Initially, Granger and his party tried to claim victory on manipulated numbers.

He later tried to claim the elections were tainted by fraud and should be cancelled. Ultimately, a national recount of votes on the indicated a win for the opposing People's Progressive Party presidential candidate Irfaan Ali.

=== Education ===
Granger attended the prestigious institution of Queen's College. He earned Bachelor and Master of Arts degrees in History from the University of Guyana. He attended the Urban Policy Development Workshop at the University of California, Los Angeles; the Defense Planning and Resource Management course at the National Defense University, Washington DC; and the Counter-Terrorism Educators' Workshop at the Joint Special Operations University (Florida, USA).

=== Commander ===
Granger was Commander of the Guyana Defence Force (GDF) and National Security Adviser to President Hoyte. He received his military training at the Mons Officer Cadet School, and the School of Infantry in the United Kingdom; the Jungle Warfare Instruction Centre in Brazil, and the Army Command and Staff College in Nigeria. He was a member of several defence and security agencies. He held the chairmanship of the Central Intelligence Committee; co-chairmanship of the Border and National Security Committee; and was a member of the Guyana Defence Board, National Drug Law Enforcement Committee, and the Disciplined Forces Commission. Granger has served in several public organisations.

=== Academic/Historian ===
He was elected to the presidencies of the History Society, the Guyana Heritage Society, the University of Guyana Guild of Graduates; and the Guyana Chess Federation. He was also a member of the University of Guyana Council, Association of Caribbean Historians, Caribbean Studies Association, Guyana Press Association, Guyana Book Foundation, and is currently a member of the Guyana Legion and the Board of Trustees of the Guyana Veterans Foundation.

=== Author ===
Granger has written extensively on national defence and public security issues. He is the author of National Defence: A Brief History of the Guyana Defence Force, 1965 – 2005; Public Security: Criminal Violence and Policing in Guyana; and Public Policy: The Crisis of Governance in Guyana.

He wrote several monographs, including Five Thousand Day War: The Struggle for Haiti's Independence, 1789–1804; The British Guiana Volunteer Force, 1948–1966; The Guyana National Service, 1974–2000; The Guyana People's Militia, 1976–1997; The Queen's College Cadet Corps, 1889–1975; Guyana's Coinage, 1808–2008; The Era of Enslavement, 1638–1838; and The Village Movement, 1839–1889. He was co-editor, with Winston McGowan and James Rose, of Themes in African–Guyanese History, and was publisher of the Guyana Review and Emancipation magazines.

=== Awards ===
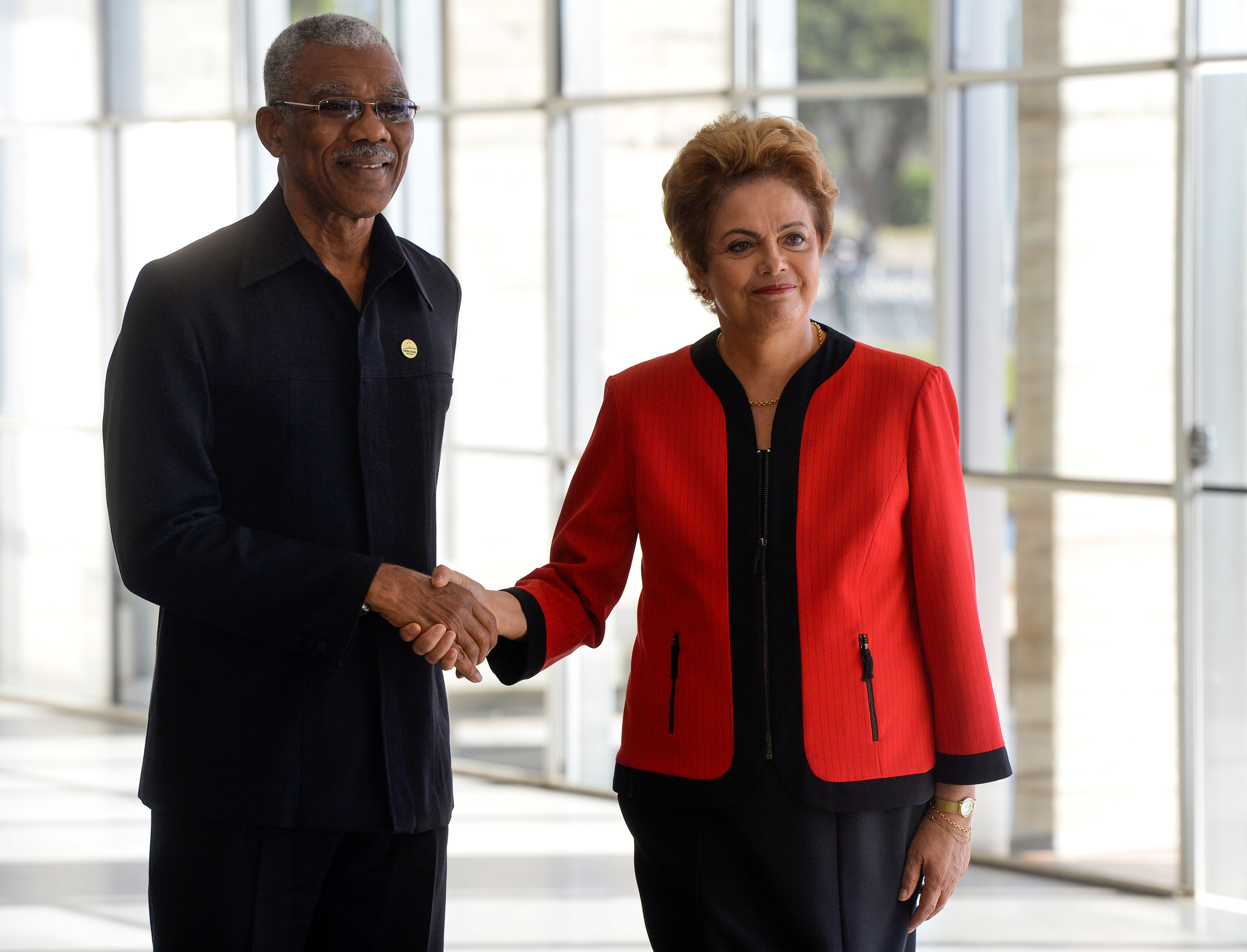
David Granger with President of Brazil Dilma Rousseff in 2015.

Granger has received various academic awards, including the President's Medal for the best graduating student; Dennis Irvine Prize for the student who has made the greatest contribution to all cultural life of the university; Council of the University Prize; Elsa Goveia Medal of Excellence; Guy de Weever History Prize; Earl Attlee History Prize; Mary Noel Menezes Award for History; Department of History Prize and others, from the University of Guyana.

He also holds three national awards: the Military Efficiency Medal (1976), the Military Service Medal (1981), and the Military Service Star (1985) for distinguished military service.

== Personal life ==
Granger is married to Sandra Granger (née Chan-A-Sue) and has two daughters, Han and Afuwa.

In November 2018, Granger was diagnosed with Non-Hodgkin lymphoma.

Political offices
Preceded by Donald Ramotar	President of Guyana; 2015–2020	Succeeded by Irfaan Ali
