= People's National Congress Reform =

Political party in Guyana

- Abbreviation: PNC (1957–1997); PNC/R (1997–2001); PNCR (since 2001)
- Leader: Aubrey Norton
- Chairman: Shurwayne Holder
- Founded: 1957
- Split from: People's Progressive Party; United Democratic Party
- Headquarters: Congress Place, Sophia, Georgetown, Guyana
- Paramilitary wing: House of Israel (1972–1985)
- Ideology: Moderate socialism; Afro-Guyanese interests; Historical: Cooperative socialism; Democratic socialism; Communism (from 1974); Marxism-Leninism (from 1969); Libertarianism (1968–1969); Anti-communism; Left-wing nationalism; Populism
- Political position: Centre-left to left-wing
- National affiliation: A Partnership for National Unity
- National Assembly: 12 / 65

Party flag

Website
- www.pncreform.com

The People's National Congress Reform (PNCR) is a social democratic political party in Guyana led by Aubrey Norton. The party currently holds 12 of the 65 seats in the National Assembly. In Guyana's ethnically divided political landscape, the PNCR's support primarily comes from the Afro-Guyanese community.

It is the main component of the Partnership for National Unity (APNU) coalition with the Alliance for Change (AFC).

== History ==
The PNC was formed in 1957 by the faction of the People's Progressive Party (PPP) led by Forbes Burnham that had lost the general elections earlier in the year. In 1959 it absorbed the United Democratic Party. The PNC won 11 seats in the 1961 elections, which saw the PPP win a majority. In the 1964 elections the PNC won 22 of the 53 seats and despite receiving fewer votes than the PPP, it was able to form the government in coalition with the United Force, with Burnham becoming prime minister. During the 1960s, the PNC was allied with Eusi Kwayana's Black Nationalist African Society for Cultural Relations with Independent Africa (ASCRIA), until the organization broke with the PNC in 1971 on government corruption issues, and reinvented itself as a multi-ethnic pro-democracy movement to later become the Working People's Alliance.

The PNC remained in power following suspected fraudulent elections in 1968, 1973 and 1980. Desmond Hoyte became PNC leader and president following Burnham's death in 1985. The party won another fraudulent election in 1985, but allowed free and fair elections to be held in 1992, in which they were defeated by the PPP/C. The PNC lost elections in 1997 and in 2001 as the PNC/R. Following Hoyte's death in 2002 he was succeeded as party leader by Robert Corbin. The party went on to contest and lose the 2006 election as part of the PNCR-One Guyana (PNCR-1G) coalition. Prior to the 2011 election it formed the A Partnership for National Unity (APNU) alliance with several smaller parties. Although the opposition APNU and AFC won more seats than the PPP/C, the leader of the largest party automatically became president, meaning PPP/C leader Donald Ramotar.

The APNU formed a joint list with the AFC for the 2015 elections, known as the APNU+AFC, in which they defeated the PPP/C, winning 33 of the 65 seats. PNCR leader David A. Granger subsequently became president. In March 2020, President David A. Granger narrowly lost the snap elections, following Granger's government loss of a vote of no confidence back in 2018. Granger accommodated a review of the election results, eventually five months later, Irfaan Ali of the People's Progressive Party/Civic was sworn in as the new president because of allegations of fraud and irregularities.

== Organisation ==
=== Arms of the party ===
The Guyana Youth and Student Movement is the youth arm of the party.

The National Congress of Women is the women's arm of the party.

=== Biennial Congress ===
The Biennial Congress (BC) is the sovereign body of the party, as it has been throughout the party's history. Congress debates reports submitted by the Central Executive Committee and resolutions on contemporary issues.

=== General Council ===
The General Council (GC) undertakes strategic oversight of the policy development between Congresses. This is chaired by the party chairman and is made up of member of the CEC, MPs, NCW, GYSM and Officers of regional party groups. The General Council meets each quarter.

=== Central Executive Committee ===
The People's National Congress Reform's Central Executive Committee (CEC) is the governing body of the Party. The Party Leader, chairman, Vice Chairman and fifteen (15) members of the executive committee are elected at the Biennial Congress. The General Secretary is appointed by the Leader, from among the fifteen elected members. Ten members are co-opted to the Central Executive by the Leader and other elected members. In addition each of the Party's 10 Regions elects a representative to the Central Executive Committee, and the Chairpersons of the Youth and Women arms of their representatives are also Central Executive Committee Members.

=== Regional Party Organisation ===
Party Committees are elected annually at the following levels.

1. Regional
2. Sub Regional
3. District
4. Neighbourhood
5. Group

The basic unit of the party is the group, which consists of no less than twelve (12) members. The voice of the party membership on party policies is heard through their interaction at all of these levels, through the year and also at the Annual Conferences.

=== New Nation ===
The New Nation is a weekly newspaper reflecting the views of the party, which is widely circulated locally and overseas.

== Election results ==
Note: elections denoted by ^{§} were considered neither free nor fair.

| Election year | Seats | | Position | Government | Head of Government |
| Election year | No. of seats won | +/– | Position | Government | Head of Government |
|---|---|---|---|---|---|
| 1957 | 3 / 14 | ▲3 | ▲2nd | PPP-Jaganite | Cheddi Jagan |
| 1961 | 11 / 35 | ▲7 | 2nd | PPP | Cheddi Jagan |
| 1964 | 22 / 53 | ▲11 | 2nd | PNC | Forbes Burnham |
| 1968^{§} | 30 / 53 | ▲8 | ▲1st | PNC | Forbes Burnham |
| 1973^{§} | 37 / 53 | ▲7 | 1st | PNC | Forbes Burnham |
| 1980^{§} | 41 / 53 | ▲4 | 1st | PNC | Forbes Burnham |
| 1985^{§} | 42 / 53 | ▲1 | 1st | PNC | Desmond Hoyte |
| 1992 | 23 / 53 | ▼19 | ▼2nd | PPP/C | Cheddi Jagan |
| 1997 | 22 / 53 | ▼1 | 2nd | PPP/C | Janet Jagan |
| 2001 | 27 / 65 | ▲5 | 2nd | PPP/C | Bharrat Jagdeo |
| 2006 | 22 / 65 | ▼8 | 2nd | PPP/C | Bharrat Jagdeo |
| 2011 | 26 / 65 | ▲4 | 2nd | PPP/C Minority | Donald Ramotar |
| 2015 | 33 / 65 | ▲7 | ▲1st | APNU+AFC | David A. Granger |
| 2020 | 31 / 65 | ▼2 | ▼2nd | PPP/C | Irfaan Ali |
| 2025 | 12 / 65 | ▼19 | ▼3rd | PPP/C | Irfaan Ali |
