= 2011 Guyanese general election =

- 28 November 2011

All 65 seats in the National Assembly 33 seats needed for a majority
- Registered: 475,496
- Turnout: 72.92% (▲3.58pp)
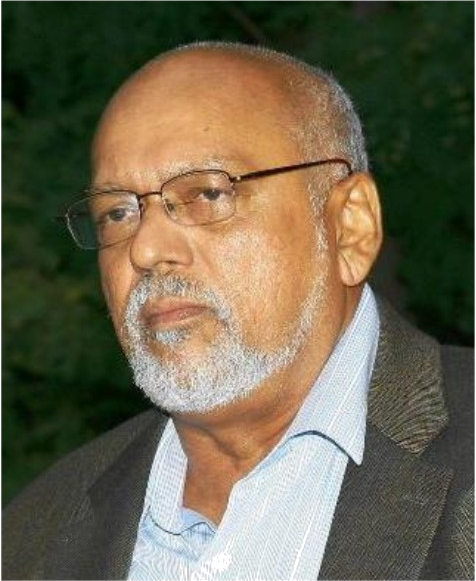

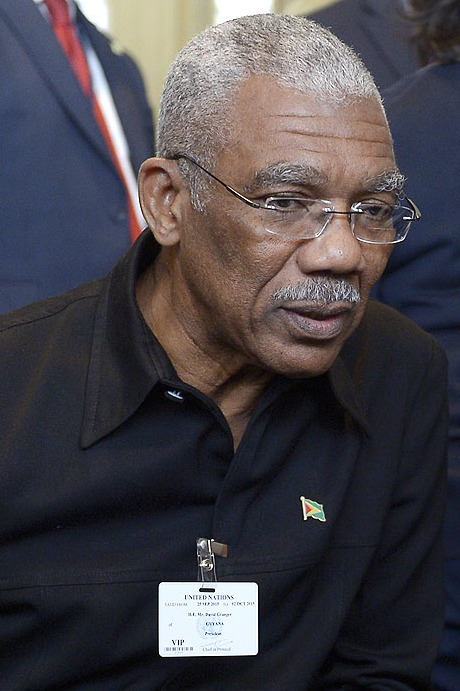

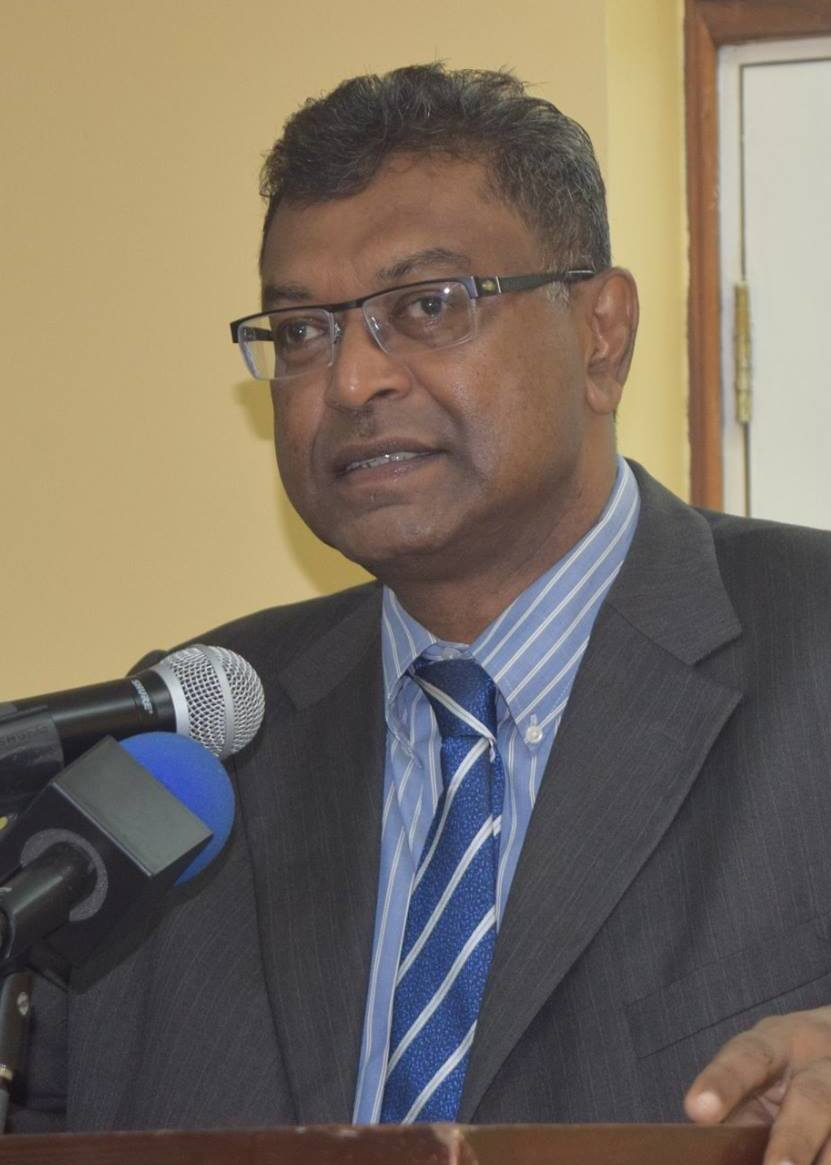
	First party	Second party	Third party
Candidate	Donald Ramotar	David A. Granger	Khemraj Ramjattan
Party	PPP/C	APNU	AFC
Last election	54.67%, 36 seats	34.07%, 22 seats (PNCR only)	8.43%, 5 seats
Seats won	32	26	7
Seat change	▼4	▲3	▲2
Popular vote	166,340	139,678	35,333
Percentage	48.60%	40.81%	10.32%
Swing	▼6.07pp	▲6.74pp	▲1.89pp
- Results by district
President before election
Bharrat Jagdeo
PPP/C
Elected President
Donald Ramotar
PPP/C

General elections were held in Guyana on 28 November 2011. The result was a victory for the People's Progressive Party/Civic, which won 32 of the 65 seats. Thus even though the combined parliamentary opposition, consisting of the Partnership for National Unity coalition (APNU) and the Alliance for Change (AFC), managed to secure an absolute majority of 33 seats, as they had not run as a single list it was Donald Ramotar of the PPP/C (the largest single party) who assumed the presidency, and not David A. Granger of the PNCR (which heads the opposition).

== Electoral system ==
The 65 members of the National Assembly were elected by closed list proportional representation in two groups; 25 members were elected from the 10 electoral districts based on the regions, and 40 elected from a single nationwide constituency. Seats were allocated using the Hare quota.

The President was elected by a first-past-the-post double simultaneous vote system, whereby each list nominated a presidential candidate and the presidential election itself was won by the candidate of the list having a plurality.

== Presidential candidates ==
The ruling People's Progressive Party/Civic nominated Donald Ramotar, the party's general secretary and advisor to outgoing President Bharrat Jagdeo. A Partnership for National Unity (an alliance of the People's National Congress Reform, the Guyana Action Party and the Working People's Alliance) nominated David A. Granger, a former commander of the Guyana Defence Force. The Alliance for Change did not join the APNU, and opted to run alone, fielding party leader Khemraj Ramjattan as its presidential candidate. The United Force nominated Peter Persaud as its presidential candidates following a leadership dispute.

== Police protection ==
Election day was declared a national holiday and troops patrolled the streets in order to prevent violence as had happened in previous elections.

== Results ==
Party	Presidential candidate	Votes	%	Seats			
Party	Presidential candidate	Votes	%	Constituency	Top-up	Total	+/–
People's Progressive Party/Civic	Donald Ramotar	166,340	48.60	13	19	32	–4
A Partnership for National Unity	David Granger	139,678	40.81	10	16	26	+3
Alliance for Change	Khemraj Ramjattan	35,333	10.32	2	5	7	+2
The United Force	Peter Persaud	885	0.26	0	0	0	–1
Total		342,236	100.00	25	40	65	0
Valid votes		342,236	98.71				
Invalid/blank votes		4,481	1.29				
Total votes		346,717	100.00				
Registered voters/turnout		475,496	72.92				
Source: GECOM, Commonwealth Observer Group

=== By region ===
Region	APNU			PPP/C			AFC			TUF		Hare quota	Total votes	Total seats
Region	Votes	%	Seats	Votes	%	Seats	Votes	%	Seats	Votes	%	Hare quota	Total votes	Total seats
Barima-Waini	887	17.06	1	3,472	66.77	1	786	15.12	0	55	1.06	2,600	5,200	2
Pomeroon-Supenaam	3,287	18.28	0	12,555	69.83	2	2,086	11.60	0	51	0.28	8,990	17,979	2
Essequibo Islands-West Demerara	14,028	27.58	1	33,424	65.71	2	3,343	6.57	0	70	0.14	16,955	50,865	3
Demerara-Mahaica	84,828	54.20	4	60,851	38.88	3	10,635	6.79	0	201	0.13	22,359	156,515	7
Mahaica-Berbice	8,906	34.83	1	13,558	53.02	1	3,079	12.04	0	29	0.11	12,786	25,572	2
East Berbice-Corentyne	10,798	19.68	0	32,360	58.97	2	11,634	21.20	1	83	0.15	18,292	54,875	3
Cuyuni-Mazaruni	2,843	48.95	1	2,376	40.91	1	505	8.69	0	84	1.45	2,904	5,808	2
Potaro-Siparuni	739	28.75	0	741	28.83	0	995	38.72	1	95	3.70	2,570	2,570	1
Upper Takutu-Upper Essequibo	2,004	27.57	0	4,135	56.89	1	946	13.02	0	183	2.52	7,268	7,268	1
Upper Demerara-Berbice	11,358	72.88	2	2,868	18.40	0	1,324	8.50	0	34	0.22	7,792	15,584	2
National Assembly top up	139,678	40.81	16	166,340	48.60	19	35,333	10.32	5	885	0.26	5,265	342,236	65
Source: GECOM Guyana Election Law

== Aftermath ==
The PPP/C won for the fifth straight time, but with a minority government. PPP/C candidate Donald Ramotar was elected President, but the opposition parties won a majority in the National Assembly.
