= A Partnership for National Unity =

Political alliance in Guyana formed in 2011

- Abbreviation: APNU
- Founded: July 2011
- Ideology: Big tent
- National affiliation: GAP; JFAP; NDF; NFA; PNCR; WPA; AFC
- National Assembly: 12 / 65

A Partnership for National Unity (APNU) is a political alliance in Guyana.

== History ==
The APNU was formed in July 2011 in order to contest the 2011 general elections, consisting of the Guyana Action Party, the Guyana Association of Local Authorities, the Guyana National Congress, the Guyana People's Partnership, the Guyana Youth Congress, the Justice for All Party, the National Democratic Front, the National Front Alliance, the People's National Congress (PNC) and the Working People's Alliance.

The alliance won 26 of the 65 seats in the National Assembly in the elections. With the Alliance for Change winning seven seats, the combined opposition parties held a majority of seats in the National Assembly. However, the People's Progressive Party (which had won 32 seats) formed the government and the leader of the largest party automatically became president.

Prior to the 2015 elections, the APNU formed a joint electoral list with the Alliance for Change. The combined list won 33 seats, allowing PNC leader David A. Granger to become President.

In the 2020 Guyanese general election, the APNU+AFC coalition — of which the APNU was the main component — was accused of attempting to manipulate the results. Following a prolonged recount and international pressure, the coalition conceded defeat. Subsequently, the Justice For All Party (JFAP) and the Working People’s Alliance (WPA) withdrew from the APNU+AFC alliance. This withdrawal came after there was a lack of representation on their parliamentary list for the opposition.

== Election results ==
| Election year | Leader | Votes | % | Seats | +/– | Position | Government |
|---|---|---|---|---|---|---|---|
| 2011 | David A. Granger | 139,678 | 40.81 | 26 / 65 | New | ▲2nd | PPP/C minority |
| 2015 | David A. Granger | As part of APNU+AFC | | 33 / 65 | ▲7 | ▲1st | APNU+AFC |
| 2020 | David A. Granger | As part of APNU+AFC | | 22 / 65 | ▼11 | ▼2nd | PPP/C |
| 2025 | Aubrey Norton | 77,998 | 17.79 | 12 / 65 | ▼10 | ▼3rd | PPP/C |
