= Alliance for Change (Guyana) =

Political party in Guyana

- Leader: Nigel Hughes
- Chairperson: David Patterson
- General Secretary: Raphael Trotman
- Founded: 2005
- Ideology: Progressivism; Social liberalism Multiracialism
- Political position: Centre to centre-left

Website
- www.afcguyana.com

The Alliance for Change (AFC) is a liberal political party in Guyana. It formed a joint electoral list with A Partnership for National Unity alliance for the 2015 elections, serving as a centrist partner in a joint APNU+AFC government.

== History ==
The party was established in 2005 by three MPs who left other parties; Raphael Trotman of the People's National Congress, Khemraj Ramjattan of the People's Progressive Party and Sheila Holder of the Working People's Alliance. Trotman became the leader of the party.

In the 2006 elections, the party received 8.1% of the vote, winning six seats. Their vote share increased to 10.3% in the 2011 elections, which saw the party win seven seats.

After the 2011 elections, the combined seats of the AFC and A Partnership for National Unity (APNU) parties outnumbered the previously dominant People's Progressive Party (PPP). As a result, the APNU+AFC alliance was able to block some of the PPP's policy goals. They threatened a motion of no confidence against the PPP in 2015, triggering the 2015 elections.

For the 2015 elections, the AFC formed a joint electoral list with the APNU. The combined list won 33 seats, a majority of a single seat, allowing PNC/APNU leader David A. Granger to become president.

In 2018, Charrandas Persaud, a member of AFC in the National Assembly, broke ranks with the party to vote in favor of a no-confidence motion against the APNU+AFC government, resulting in the motion passing by a single vote. Persaud was removed from the AFC and Parliament, and fled to Canada. Six months of legal battles over the validity of the vote ensued, with the result confirmed in June 2019. This led to the 2020 Guyanese general election.

During the 2023 Guayana Esequiba crisis and increased tensions with Venezuela, Alliance For Change called for a ban on Venezuelans with Guyanese citizenship from voting in elections, as well as not granting citizenship to more people from the neighboring country.

== Election results ==
Election year	Leader	Votes	%	Seats	+/–	Position	Government
2006	Raphael Trotman	28,366	8.43	5 / 65	New	▲3rd	PPP/C
2011	Khemraj Ramjattan	35,333	10.32	7 / 65	▲2	3rd	PPP/C minority
2015	David A. Granger	As part of APNU+AFC		33 / 65	▲26	▲1st	APNU+AFC
2020	David A. Granger	As part of APNU+AFC		9 / 65	▼24	▼3rd	PPP/C
2025	Nigel Hughes	3,610	0.82	0 / 65	▼9	▼5th	Extra-parliamentary

== Elected representatives ==
=== 2020 Guyanese general election ===
Name	Constituency
Catherine Andrea Hughes	IV-Demerara-Mahaica
David Anthony Patterson	National Top-Up
Deonarine Ramsaroop	IV-Demerara-Mahaica
Devin Lynton Sears	X-Upper Demerara-Berbice
Haimraj Bernard Rajkumar	National Top-Up
Juretha Vanessa Fernandes	National Top-Up
Khemraj Ramjattan	National Top-Up
Raphael Trotman	National Top-Up
Sherod Avery Duncan	National Top-Up
