= People's Progressive Party/Civic =

Political party in Guyana

- Abbreviation: PPP (1950–1991); PPP/C (since 1991)
- General Secretary: Bharrat Jagdeo
- Founders: Cheddi Jagan; Janet Jagan
- Founded: 1 January 1950
- Merger of: Labour Party; PAC
- Headquarters: Georgetown
- Ideology: Social democracy Democratic centralism Civic nationalism Multiculturalism; Historical: Socialism; Communism; Marxism–Leninism; Indo-Guyanese civil rights Hindu and Muslim religious rights
- Political position: Centre-left; Historical: Left-wing
- International affiliation: International Meeting of Communist and Workers' Parties
- Slogan: One country, one people, one future
- National Assembly: 36 / 65

Election symbol
- Cup

Party flag

Website
- votepppcivic2025.com

The People's Progressive Party/Civic (PPP/C) is a major political party in Guyana. As of 2025, the party holds 36 of the 65 seats in the National Assembly and rules the government since 2020. It has been the ruling party in the past as well, most recently between 1992 and 2015. In Guyana's ethnically divided political landscape, the PPP/C is a multi-ethnic organization with its base of support from the Indo-Guyanese people, especially Hindus and Muslims.

== History ==
The PPP was founded on 1 January 1950 as a merger of the British Guiana Labour Party led by Forbes Burnham and the Political Affairs Committee led by Cheddi Jagan, and was the first mass party in the country. It was initially a multi-ethnic party supported by workers and intellectuals. The party held its first congress on 1 April 1951. Its third congress was held in 1953, with Burnham unsuccessfully seeking to become party leader. The party went on to win the 1953 elections, taking 18 of the 24 elected seats in the House of Assembly, resulting in Jagan becoming Chief Minister.

However, Jagan's radical social reforms led to the British authorities sending in troops shortly after the elections, claiming there was the threat of a Marxist revolution. The PPP government was removed from office and an unelected Interim Legislative Council replaced the House of Assembly. General elections were held in 1957, by which time the PPP had split into two factions, which competed against each other at the elections; the faction led by Jagan won nine seats, whilst the Burnham-led faction won three. Following the elections, Burnham's faction left the party to establish the Afro-Guyanese-dominated People's National Congress (PNC), establishing an ethnic divide between the two parties, with the PPP left representing Indo-Guyanese. The PPP won the 1961 elections by a 1.6% margin, but received almost double the number of seats compared to the PNC, leading to serious inter-racial violence.

Convinced that Jagan was likely a Communist, the Kennedy administration used the Central Intelligence Agency and forced a reluctant United Kingdom to aid a campaign by conservatives and Burnham loyalists to evict the PPP government. Riots ensued, with the hope of ousting the Chief Minister. In the 1964 elections the PPP won a plurality of the seats, but the PNC and the United Force together won more seats, and were invited to form a government. Jagan refused to step down, and had to be removed from office by Governor Richard Luyt.

Following independence and an outright PNC victory in the 1968 elections, the political scene became increasingly polarized by ethnicity, and in early 1970 the Burnham government declared a republic organized on socialist, non-aligned principles. This action co-opted much of the PPP's programme, and the PPP eventually extended limited support to the ruling party on the basis of appeals to patriotism and national unity. The controversy over this move led to the emergence of a "third force", the Working People's Alliance (WPA) of Walter Rodney, in 1979. All three major parties drew to different extents from Marxist thought, making the racial divide even more pronounced. A series of elections in the 1970s and 1980s were rigged by the PNC, who won an increasing number of seats on each occasion.

A political opening was initiated by PNC President Desmond Hoyte in the late 1980s, and free elections were held in 1992, which resulted in a PPP/C victory and Jagan becoming president. It was also around this time that the PPP/C began a practical shift from socialism to a market-oriented economy in 1992, as a result of a Structural Adjustment Programme created by the World Bank and International Monetary Fund. Jagan died in March 1997, with Sam Hinds becoming president. However, Cheddi's widow Janet Jagan was the PPP/C candidate for the presidency in the 1997 elections, which the party won, resulting in Jagan becoming the first American-born female head of state.

Jagan resigned as president in 1999 due to ill health and was succeeded by Bharrat Jagdeo, who led the PPP/C to victory in the 2001 elections. A major scandal erupted in 2004 when farmer George Bacchus announced that he had evidence implicating the PPP/C Minister for Home Affairs, Ronald Gajraj, in the operation of "phantom death squads" that killed up to 40 people, including the brother of George Bacchus. President Jagdeo quickly dismissed the allegations, although the PNCR continued to push for a thorough investigation. Bacchus himself was assassinated on 24 June 2004, leading to further outrage and allegations of a cover-up by the PNCR. Gajraj resigned, pending an investigation by a government commission of inquiry. The following year, Gajraj was formally exonerated by the commission, which did however say that he had an "unhealthy relationship" with organized crime.

The PPP/C went on to win the 2006 elections, before Jagdeo stepped down in 2011 to allow Donald Ramotar to run as the party's presidential candidate in the elections that year. The elections saw the PPP/C win 32 seats, A Partnership for National Unity (an alliance including the PNCR) 26 and the Alliance for Change seven. Although the opposition APNU and AFC had won a majority of seats (33), the PPP/C was able to retain power as the election rules meant that the leader of the largest single party became president. As a result, the AFC and APNU ran a combined list for the 2015 elections, which won 33 seats, allowing PNCR leader David A. Granger to become president. In March 2020, President David A. Granger narrowly lost the snap elections, following Granger's government loss of a vote of no confidence back in 2018. Granger refused to accept the results, but eventually five months later, Irfaan Ali of the People's Progressive Party/Civic was sworn in as the new president because of allegations of fraud and irregularities.

On May 5, 2024, at its 32nd Congress, the PPP/C removed "Marxism-Leninism" and "socialism" from its constitution but retained democratic centralism.

== Election results ==
Note: elections denoted by ^{§} were considered neither free nor fair.

Election year	Leader	Votes	%	Seats	+/–	Position	Government
1953	Cheddi Jagan	77,695	51.04	18 / 24	New	▲1st	PPP
1957	Cheddi Jagan	55,552	47.51	9 / 14	▼9	1st	PPP-Jaganite
1961	Cheddi Jagan	93,085	42.63	20 / 35	▲11	1st	PPP
1964	Cheddi Jagan	109,332	45.84	24 / 53	▲4	1st	PNC
1968^{§}	Cheddi Jagan	113,991	36.49	19 / 53	▼5	▼2nd	PNC
1973^{§}	Cheddi Jagan	92,374	26.56	14 / 53	▼5	2nd	PNC
1980^{§}	Cheddi Jagan	78,414	19.46	10 / 53	▼4	2nd	PNC
1985^{§}	Cheddi Jagan	45,926	15.77	8 / 53	▼2	2nd	PNC
1992	Cheddi Jagan	162,058	53.45	28 / 53	▲20	▲1st	PPP/C
1997	Janet Jagan	220,667	55.26	29 / 53	▲1	1st	PPP/C
2001	Bharrat Jagdeo	210,013	52.96	34 / 65	▲5	1st	PPP/C
2006	Bharrat Jagdeo	183,887	54.67	36 / 65	▲2	1st	PPP/C
2011	Donald Ramotar	166,340	48.60	32 / 65	▼4	1st	PPP/C minority
2015	Donald Ramotar	202,694	49.20	32 / 65	Steady	▼2nd	APNU+AFC
2020	Irfaan Ali	233,336	50.69	33 / 65	▲1	▲1st	PPP/C
2025	Irfaan Ali	242,498	55.31	36 / 65	▲3	▲1st	PPP/C

== Guyanese Presidents from the PPP/C ==
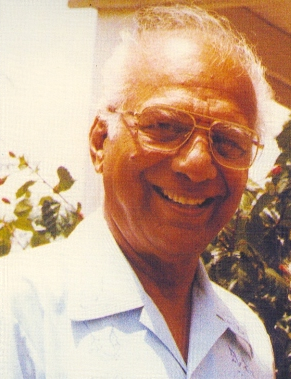
Cheddi Jagan (1992–1997)

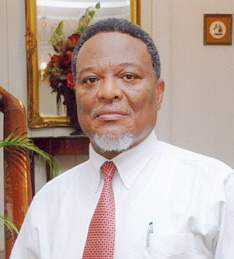
Sam Hinds (1997)

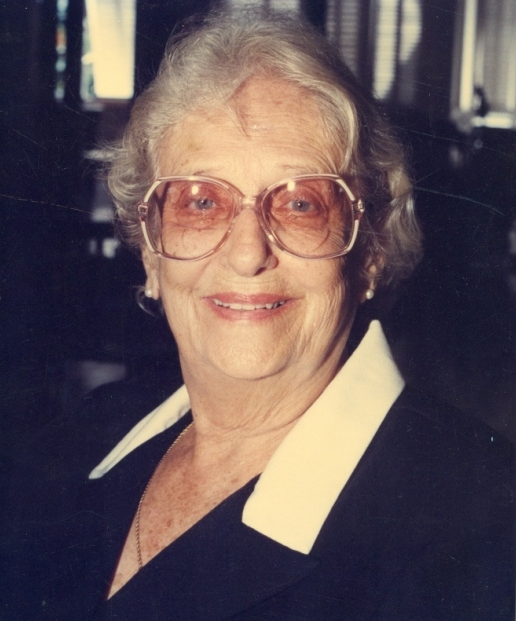
Janet Jagan (1997–1999)

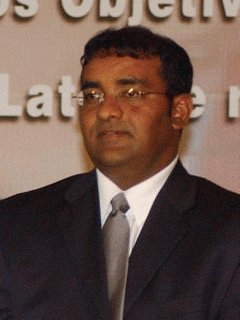
Bharrat Jagdeo (1999–2011)

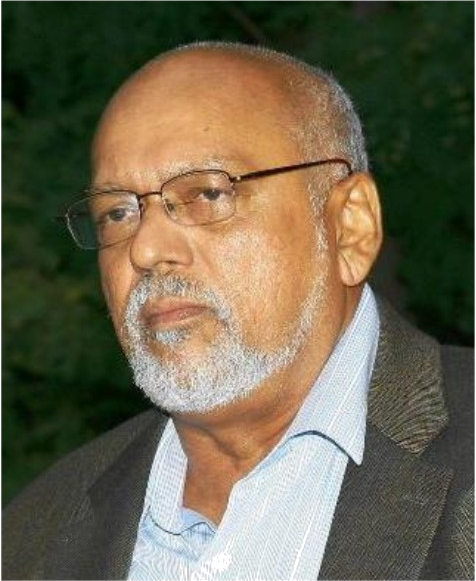
Donald Ramotar (2011–2015)

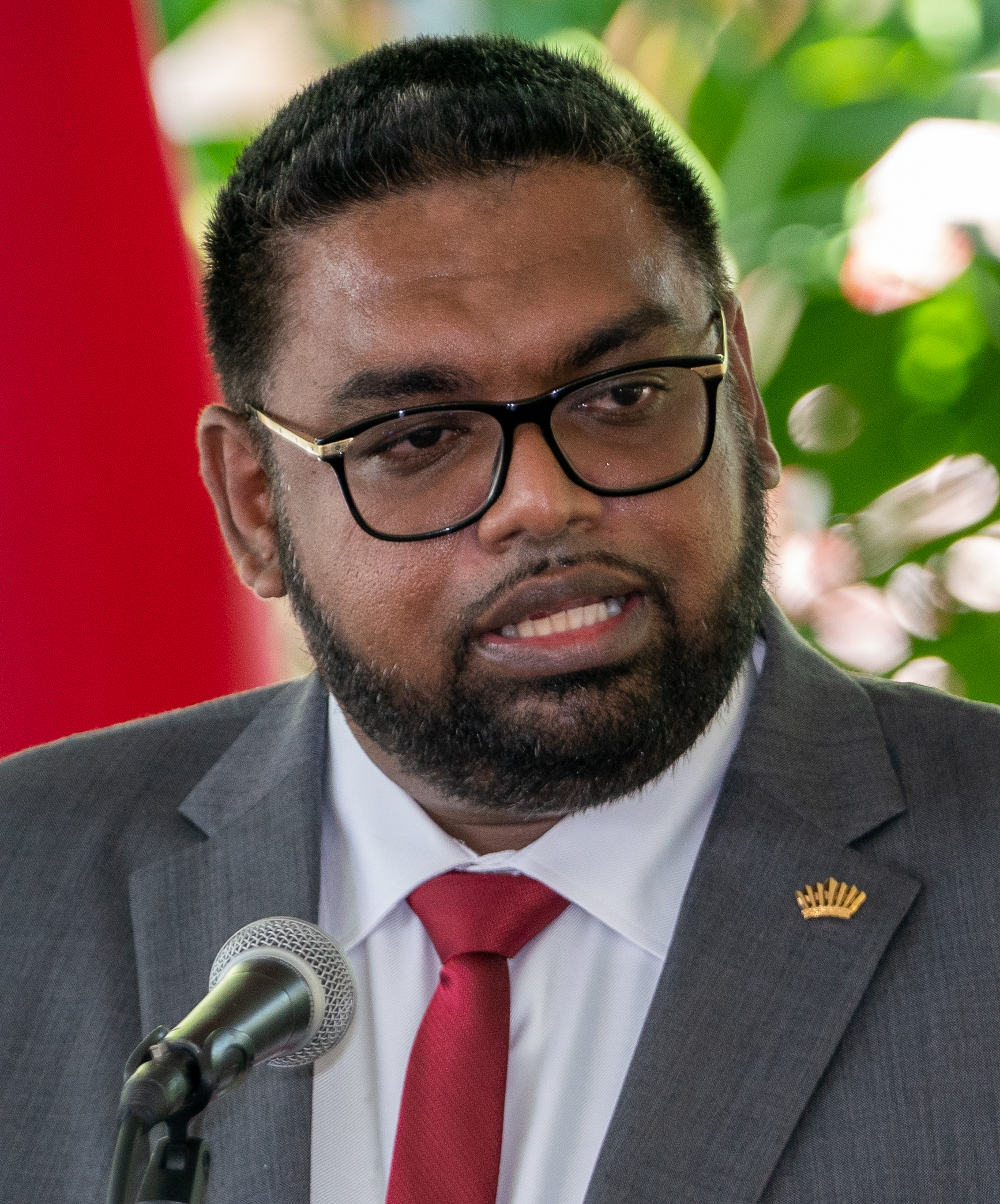
Irfaan Ali (since 2020)
