= Education in Guyana =

Education in The Cooperative Republic of Guyana
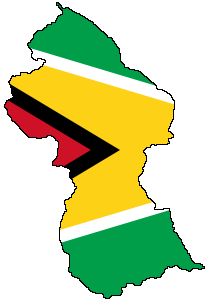

Ministry of Education
- Minister of Education: Priya Manickchand

National education budget (2008)
- Budget: $GYD 18.5 billion (public- all levels)

General details
- Primary languages: English (official), Guyanese Creole, Indigenous/Amerindian languages
- System type: public, private

Literacy
- Male: 99.1
- Female: 98.5

Enrollment
- Total: 65.9
- Primary: 88.1%
- Secondary: 61.2%
- Post secondary: ^{2}

Attainment
- Secondary diploma: 62.1 %
- Post-secondary diploma: 1.8% (BA or equivalent), 7.2% (other tertiary)

Education in Guyana is provided largely by the Government of Guyana, through the Ministry of Education and its arms in the ten different regions of the country. Guyana's education system is a legacy from its time as British Guiana, and is similar to that of the other anglophone member states of the Caribbean Community, which are affiliated to the Caribbean Examinations Council (CXC). School curricula, funding, standards and other policies are set by the central government and implemented through the Ministry of Education and related agencies. The Education System is divided into eleven districts, ten of which correspond to the national administrative and geographical regions of the country, while the capital, Georgetown, is treated as a separate education district, district 11. With 8.3% of its GDP spent on education, Guyana sits with Cuba, Iceland, Denmark and Botswana as among the few countries with top spending on education.

The statutory age for beginning compulsory education is five years nine months, and students are required to attend school until age 16. However, children who do not meet the statutory age to begin school are sometimes enrolled early or generally attend some kind of pre-school. To meet the requirements for compulsory education students generally attend public schools, but there are a few private schools which offer education at one or all stages of learning; home-schooling is virtually non-existent in Guyana. The academic year usually begins in September and ends in July of the following year and with the exception of President's College students have a five-hour school day.

Outside of the private sector, free education from nursery to university was the norm in Guyana until the mid-1990s. The current provision of education is subsidised from nursery through secondary schools, with students now having to pay for tuition at some tertiary institutions. This development reflected a change from the 1970s when Guyana became a socialist-inspired Cooperative Republic. The country's educational policy in the 1970s was intended to broaden access to education, as before that education beyond primary school was expensive and designed primarily for a small elite. In the 1970s single-sex schools were made co-educational; private and parochial schools were incorporated into the public system.

The reform which occurred was part of a wider phenomenon in a post-colonial CARICOM aiming to provide an education that reflected the full heritage and aspirations of independent states. Today, as part of its obligations to the CXC, Guyana's educational specifications and assessment procedures are bound by regional guidelines. Students wear uniforms to school.

Guyana has a reading literacy rate at 92% of the population over age 15. Despite this high level of reading literacy, significant portions of the Guyanese population have functional literacy difficulties resulting in a lack of employability and other socio-economic disadvantages; this has caused government and charitable agencies to push education as a tool in poverty reduction.

Guyana is one of the highest ranked developing countries in the Education Index of the United Nations Human Development Report. With a score of 0.943 on the Education Index, its overall rank is 37, but ranks third in the Caribbean after Cuba and Barbados, and second in South America after Argentina. According to DFID, Guyana has achieved the Millennium Development Goal of universal primary education but continues to struggle with the provision of increased access to satisfactory secondary education. As one of the poorest countries in the Western Hemisphere, instruction in Guyana's schools makes little or no use of instructional technologies such as interactive whiteboards or other multimedia tools. Indeed, many schools are short on basic resources, especially in the areas of science and technology, and this sometimes puts students at a disadvantage when compared to their counterparts in the region.

As part of a continuous effort to tackle inequalities and inefficiencies in the system, the parliament of Guyana has been debating and redrafting the 2007 Education bill. The bill moves Guyana closer to a comprehensive education system, but retains the use of corporal punishment as a disciplinary measure, despite Guyana's obligations to international conventions such as the UN Rights of the Child.

The Human Rights Measurement Initiative (HRMI) finds that Guyana is fulfilling only 85.0% of what it should be fulfilling for the right to education based on the country's level of income. HRMI breaks down the right to education by looking at the rights to both primary education and secondary education. While taking into consideration Guyana's income level, the nation is achieving 84.7% of what should be possible based on its resources (income) for primary education and 85.3% for secondary education.

== Structure ==
Level or Grade	Typical age
Preschool
Various optional programs, such as Head Start	Under 6
Pre-Kindergarten	4-5
Kindergarten	5-6
Primary School
Grade 1	6–7
Grade 2	7–8
Grade 3	8–9
Grade 4	9–10
Grade 5	10–11
Grade 6	11–12
Secondary School
Grade 7	12–13
Grade 8	13–14
Grade 9	14-15
Grade 10	15-16
Grade 11	16-17
Grade 12	17–18
Grade 13	18–19
Post-secondary education
Tertiary education (College or University)	Ages vary
Vocational education	Ages vary
Graduate education
Adult education

== Nursery school ==
Nursery education in Guyana is not compulsory, though most children attend them. Nursery or kindergarten schools, sometimes referred to as play schools are provided by the government as well as private entities. It is essentially a formalised extension of early childhood education and is available to children who are age 3 years 9 months at the end of the first term of the school year. The education section of Guyana's National Development Strategy (NDS), chapter 18, further indicates that the nursery education programme is a two-year programme which focuses on child development.

The introduction of a national nursery education programme occurred in 1976 as part of larger education reforms in the country. The programme is delivered in specially designed nursery schools or in primary schools. Some nursery schools function as feeder programmes for primary schools which are seen as high achievers - gaining entrance into those schools inevitably becomes competitive and sometimes exclusive.

Nursery schools in Guyana since the 1980s have faced serious challenges such as adequate numbers of trained teachers as well as adequate facilities. However, as early childhood education takes on a higher level of importance in development and poverty eradication, efforts are afoot to address those challenges. UNICEF is one body that is involved in addressing nursery education challenges as it is a major funder of initiatives which further childhood development in Guyana and elsewhere.

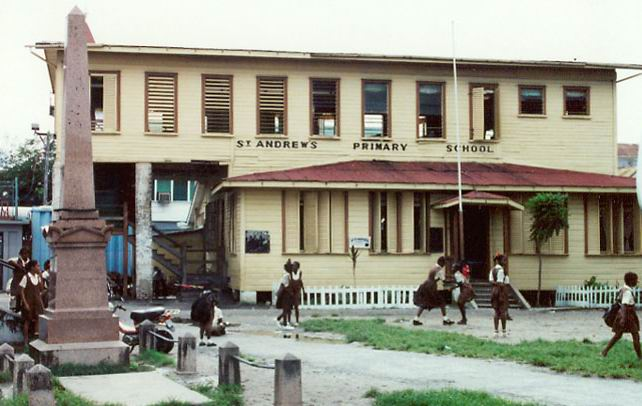
A primary school in Georgetown, Guyana.

== Primary school ==
Primary education is compulsory and requires attendance for six years. Over the last five years education in Guyana has been undergoing continuous reform. The six-year programme is no longer organised as "Preparatory A and B, and Standards 1 to 4" - it is now Grades 1 to 6. Part of this reform has meant that the Secondary School Entrance Education (SSEE) 11+ or common entrance exam is no longer used to award places in secondary schools, instead primary school students now take the Grade Six (Level 6) assessment to gain a secondary school place. One of the objectives of this reform is to tackle the problem of overcrowding at oversubscribed schools.

There are essentially three types of primary schools: the first and most common one is the primary school which provides a typical primary education - from Grades 1 to 6, then there is the primary school which has a primary and a secondary department, and the primary school which has a nursery and secondary department.

The curriculum of primary schools in Guyana is designed to impart basic literacy and numeracy skills, and also aims to prepare students for secondary education. This literacy and numeracy training is complemented with lessons in Social Studies and Integrated Science. Though Guyana is considered to have met its Millennium Development Goal for universal primary education, the challenge for primary education remains equity of access in terms of curriculum delivery, quality and relevance. Equity of access is a problem largely as a result of how the primary education system is structured, as well as uneven resource availability based on geography - that is, schools on Guyana's coasts and in urban areas tend to be better resourced than schools in the hinterland or in rural areas.

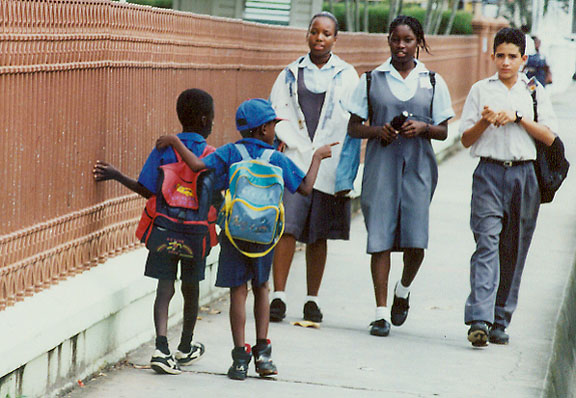
St. Stanislaus College and St. Stephen's Primary school students in Georgetown.

== Secondary school ==
Secondary schooling in Guyana is tiered. There are senior secondary schools, which tend to be more academic in orientation, junior secondary schools, Community High Schools and Secondary Departments of Primary Schools. Since the current reforms are phased, students who perform well in their primary school assessments are awarded places at senior secondary schools such as Bishops' High School, St. Stanislaus College, St. Joseph High School, St. Rose's High School, President's College and Queen's College rather than a school in their geographic catchment area.

For the most part, the curriculum offered in secondary schools is that of the CXC geared towards preparing students to leave secondary school with subject passes at the Caribbean Secondary Education Certificate (CSEC) or the Caribbean Advanced Proficiency Examination (CAPE). CSEC is equivalent to the UK's General Certificate of Secondary Education (GCSE) and CAPE to A-levels. The senior and junior secondary schools prepare students for the CSEC and CAPE qualifications, but the Community High Schools and secondary departments prepare students for the Secondary Schools Proficiency Examination (SSPE); students who do well on this exam may transfer to senior or junior secondary schools. Students attending senior or junior secondary schools attend from Grade 7 to Grade 11 for CSEC and move on to Grade 12 if interested in the CAPE qualification. Community High and students in secondary departments of primary schools, attend from Grade 7 to Grade 10. GCSE and A-level examinations are still offered in some schools but they are expected to be phased out as part of the educational reforms system.

Since the 1990s Guyana has seen the return of faith schools, primarily in the secondary sector. There is one International School - the Georgetown International School. The other private schools recognised by the Ministry of Education are: ISA Islamic School (Muslim), Mae's School, The New Guyana School, School of the Nations (Baháʼí Faith) and Marian Academy (Roman Catholic). These private schools have become highly desirable as they are seen to offer a better quality of education compared to public schools.

In most cases, students are considered to have had a good secondary education after obtaining a minimum of five CSEC subjects at the CXC; depending on their career interests, students may spend a further two years in secondary school for CAPE offerings or proceed directly to further or higher education courses. Though the CSEC subjects are normally taken in Grade Eleven and the CAPE subjects in Grades Twelve and Thirteen, students may take them earlier if so prepared. Students are required to take a foreign language in some schools, but outside of core subjects, the curriculum generally allows students to focus on their interests. The International Baccalaureate programme is not available in Guyana, but parents and students interested in the Advanced Placement programme can pursue it at the Georgetown International School.

Anna Regina Multilateral school and President's College are Guyana's only boarding schools; both of them are co-educational public schools.

== Special schools ==
Students with disabilities or special needs are educated in schools specially designed for them. They follow the national curriculum, but this is supplemented or adapted where required. As in some places, there is still a stigma associated with attending a special school, as a result some parents avoid enrolling their children. Apart from that, there is no society-wide consciousness or campaign for improving facilities for disabled students. Some schools are partnered with mainstream schools as in the case of President's College and the David Rose School; in this partnership President's College students raise funds and provide other forms of support for the students of the David Rose School. Some special schools cater for the emotionally and socially deprived as well as students who have disabilities such as visual or auditory impairment.

== Vocational school/Technical school ==
There are about ten technical/vocational schools across the country which are post-secondary in nature. Among the more prominent technical/vocational schools are the Government Technical Institute, Guyana Industrial Training Centre, Carnegie School of Home Economics, (formerly known as the Carnegie Trade School) which was founded on a grant by the Carnegie Trustee in 1933, Guyana School of Agriculture, New Amsterdam Technical Institute (NATI) and the Linden Technical Institute. Private entities such as the Guyana Sugar Corporation and the Private Aircraft Owners Association also provide technical education. In 2019, the Art Williams and Harry Wendt Aeronautical Engineering School became accredited to issue associate degrees and certificates in aircraft maintenance.

== Further education/Higher education ==
This sector includes teacher training colleges, advanced technical schools and the university.

=== Colleges ===
- Cyril Potter College of Education was established by law in the 19th century to train primary school teachers; today, its main campus is at Turkeyen, Greater Georgetown with centres at New Amsterdam and Linden, Rose Hall, Anna Regina, Vreed-en-Hoop and provides two and three-year programmes for nursery, primary and secondary teachers, the programmes are in-service and pre-service.
- School of Nursing (Georgetown, New Amsterdam) These institutions provide basic training for nursing assistants, professional nurses, as well as midwifery.
- The Critchlow Labour College was established in 1967as the educational arm of the trade Union Movement. It provides pre-university courses in Industrial Relations, business, sociology and a CXC programme for school leavers who need to obtain those qualifications. It has plans to introduce associate degrees but has postponed that initiative because of funding problems.
- Kuru Kuru Cooperative College is accredited by the University of Guyana and the Association of Caribbean Tertiary Institutions. This institution lists its main aim as that of providing training on all aspects of cooperative business.

Music studies

Guyana is home to many unique music traditions, but despite its importance for cultural heritage, music has tended to receive minimal support in schools. Music studies are offered as part of teacher training at CPCE, and a fledgling National School of Music was opened in 2012.

Other colleges

There are also many small off-shore private universities.

=== University of Guyana ===
The University of Guyana is the major university that operates on two campuses, Turkeyen (Demerara) and at Tain (Berbice) . It was established in 1963 after Guyana expressed its preference for a local university given the costs associated with Guyanese students attending the University of the West Indies (UWI) and other universities.

It provides a professional education in many areas, but students who want to pursue training in fields such as anthropology, astronomy or librarianship must travel abroad or pursue distance studies. Students who cannot afford university tuition fees may take a student loan from the state-run student loans agency. The University of Guyana like the University of the West Indies is an associate member of CARICOM, it is also a member of the Association of Commonwealth Universities.

Texila American University (TAU)

In addition to the University of Guyana, Texila American University (TAU) is another key institution offering higher education in Guyana, especially in the field of medicine. Established in 2010, TAU provides a Doctor of Medicine (MD) program accredited by the Accreditation Commission on Colleges of Medicine( ACCM), Caribbean Accreditation Authority for Education in Medicine and other Health Professions (CAAM-HP) and the British Accreditation Council (BAC).The university is a popular choice among students seeking an international standard medical education in a culturally familiar setting. TAU offers students access to global clinical rotations and opportunities for U.S. residency placements. The university also has a diverse international student community representing over 45 countries. Additionally, as a Sallie Mae-approved institution, financial options are available for qualified students

== Continuing/Adult education ==
The Adult Education Association and, the Institute of Adult and Continuing Education, the extramural arm of the University of Guyana fulfil this role along with many other private and government post-secondary institutions. The government of Guyana is administers a National Fast Track Literacy programme which aims to improve the literacy skills of young people and adults who did not complete formal education.

== See also ==
- Education financing in Guyana
- List of secondary schools in Guyana
- List of universities and colleges in Guyana
- Caribbean Examinations Council
