= List of schools in Guyana =

Number of public schools (2017)

- Nursery: 471
- Primary: 436
- Secondary: 242
- Special education: 6

Notable secondary schools in Guyana:

- Anna Regina Secondary School
- Berbice High School
- Bishops' High School, Guyana
- Central High School, Guyana
- Georgetown International Academy
- Hindu College, Cove and John
- Mackenzie High School
- Marian Academy
- North West Secondary School
- Port Kaituma Community School
- Queen's College, Georgetown
- Santa Rosa Secondary School
- School of the Nations
- St. Rose's High School, Guyana
- St. Stanislaus College

== See also ==
- List of universities and colleges in Guyana
- Education in Guyana
