= Joy Ford Austin =

Guyanese-American non-profit executive

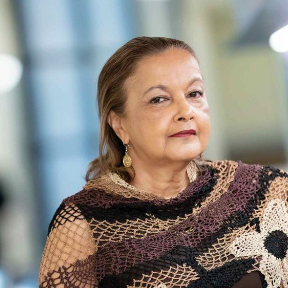
- Joy Ford Austin at Uline Arena by James Kagley
- Born: Georgetown, British Guiana, British Empire
- Education: St. Rose's High School; McMaster University; Trinity Washington University
- Occupations: non-profit executive, philanthropist
- Spouse: Bobby William Austin
- Children: Princess Ariana Austin Makonnen
- Parent(s): John Meredith Ford; Sarojini Janki

Joy Ford Austin is a Guyanese-American non-profit executive, philanthropist, humanitarian, and arts patron. She was the director of the African American Museums Association, which she helped found in 1980, and worked with institutions to preserve African-American culture and history. From 2000 to 2020, Austin served as the executive director of Humanities DC, an affiliate of the National Endowment for the Humanities. Since stepping down as executive director of Humanities DC, she has served as the president of AustinFord Associates and as the chief executive officer of Joy Ford Austin Arts and Humanities Advocacy.

== Early life and education ==
Austin was born in Georgetown, Guyana. She is the daughter of John Meredith Ford, who served as Lord Mayor of Georgetown from 1970 to 1972, and Sarojini Janki Ford, who worked in the Ministry of Education. Her paternal grandparents were Ernest Lochmohr Ford and Florence Jean Goring. Austin's maternal family were indentured servants from India who arrived in Guyana during colonial rule and joined the Canadian Presbyterian Mission. Her maternal grandfather, Thomas Janki, was the first ordained Presbyterian elder for Demerara in British Guiana.

Austin was raised in the Presbyterian faith and attended Burns Memorial Presbyterian Church, the first congreagation of the Guyana Presbyterian Church. She graduated in 1968 from St. Rose's High School, a Catholic school run by the Ursulines. She studied English literature at McMaster University in Hamilton, Ontario, graduating in 1972. In 2002, Austin earned a master's degree in organizational leadership from Trinity Washington University.

== Career ==
Austin worked as a program manager at the Center for Arts and Culture in Washington, D.C. from 1998 to 2000. From 2000 to 2020, she served as the executive director of Humanities DC, an affiliate of the National Endowment for the Humanities. In 2005, she launched the D.C. Community Heritage Project, a partnership between Humanities DC and the city government's Historic Preservation Office focused on preserving D.C. historic buildings and documenting the histories of people who lived and worked there. As executive director, she also produced the D.C. Digital Museum and managed Culture Capital.

She was the founding director of the African American Museums Association from 1980 to 1987. As a director, she worked with DuSable Black History Museum and Education Center, Charles H. Wright Museum of African American History, Boston African American National Historic Site, Hampton University Museum, Anacostia Community Museum, Great Plains Black History Museum, and Black American West Museum.

Austin is the founder and president of AustinFord Associates, a consulting firm that works with the Presidential Commission for the National Museum of African American History and Culture, the W. K. Kellogg Foundation, Smithsonian Institution, Telesis Corporation, and the Chicago Housing Trust. Since May 2020, she has served as the chief executive officer of Joy Ford Austin Arts and Humanities Advocacy.

== Personal life ==
Austin became a naturalized American citizen when she was 26 years old.

She is married to Bobby William Austin, a sociologist and writer. One of their daughters, Ariana Joy Lalita Austin, is married to Prince Joel Dawit Makonnen, a great-grandson of Ethiopian Emperor Haile Selassie. She is the aunt of cultural worker and community organizer Priya Dadlani.
