= Ariana Austin Makonnen =

American businesswoman, philanthropist, and arts manager

Princess Ariana
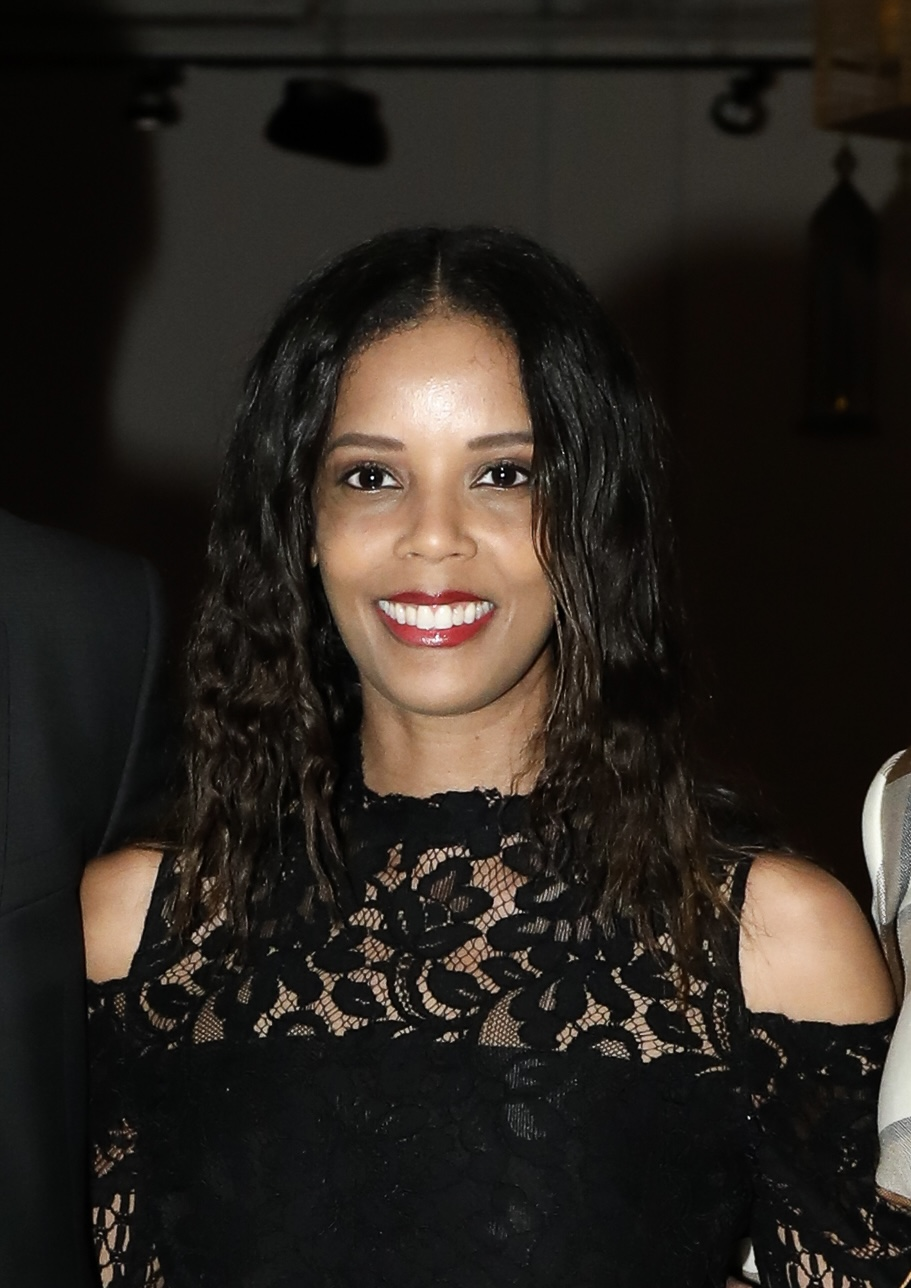
- Princess Ariana at the Seeds of Africa Benefit in New York City in 2019
- Born: Ariana Joy Lalita Austin; Washington, D.C., U.S.
- Spouse: Prince Joel Dawit Makonnen (m. 2017)
Names
- Ariana Joy Lalita Austin Makonnen
- House: Solomon (by marriage)
- Father: Bobby William Austin
- Mother: Joy Ford
- Religion: Ethiopian Orthodox
- Occupation: businesswoman philanthropist arts manager
- Education: Fisk University (BA); Harvard University (MA)

Princess Ariana Austin Makonnen (née Ariana Joy Lalita Austin) is an American businesswoman, philanthropist, arts manager, and member of the former Ethiopian imperial family. She founded the evening arts festival Art All Night and the creative agency French Thomas. In 2018, she and her husband, Prince Joel Dawit Makonnen, co-launched Old World/New World Productions, a media company that produces content focusing on the African diaspora.

Makonnen, who is the granddaughter of Lord Mayor John Meredith Ford of Georgetown, Guyana, serves as the Peace Corps' s NPO Friends of Guyana (FROG) Goodwill Ambassador. In 2019, she spoke at the Third Annual Women's Leadership and Business Conference at the Arthur Chung Conference Centre.

== Family ==
Makonnen was born in Washington, D.C., to Bobby William Austin, president of the Neighborhood Associates Corporation (NAC) and the first African-American full-time faculty member at Georgetown University, and Joy Ford, the former executive director of Humanities DC, an affiliate of the National Endowment for the Humanities. She is of African-American and Indo-Guyanese descent. Her maternal grandfather, John Meredith Ford, was Lord Mayor of Georgetown, Guyana. Her maternal great-grandfather, Thomas Janki, was the first ordained Presbyterian elder for Demerara in British Guiana.

== Education and career ==
Makonnen graduated magna cum laude with a bachelor's degree in English literature from Fisk University. While at Fisk, she was inducted into Phi Beta Kappa. As an undergraduate she studied abroad at Magdalen College, Oxford and through Semester at Sea. She has a master's degree in arts education and creative writing from Harvard University. After finishing school she moved to Paris and worked as a teacher and freelance journalist. Inspired by the French art festival Nuit Blanche, she founded and directed Art All Night, an evening arts festival in Washington, D.C. featuring visual arts, live paintings, musical performances, light projections, and poetry readings. Five years after starting Art All Night, Makonnen founded French Thomas, a creative agency that produced cultural and educational experiences in New York City, Camden and Washington, D.C.

She worked at a division of Rockefeller Philanthropy Advisors and serves as the Goodwill Ambassador of Friends of Guyana. She is a contributing writer for HuffPost.

In November 2018 Makonnen and her husband launched Old World/New World Productions, a media company that produces documentaries, feature films, and television shows focused on Africa and the African diaspora.

In May 2019 Makonnen was a co-host at a salon dinner for women leaders hosted by German diplomat Emily Haber.

In September 2019 Makonnen was a speaker at the third annual Women's Leadership and Business Conference, PowHERful: Transition from Inspiration to Action at the Arthur Chung Conference Centre in Guyana. She delivered a speech on cultural entrepreneurship.

Makonnen co-founded the production Wax and Gold with her husband. In 2025, she launched the podcast Building Boldly.

== Personal life ==
She met Prince Joel Dawit Makonnen, a great-grandson of the last Emperor of Ethiopia, at Pearl nightclub in Washington, D.C. in December 2005. She and Prince Joel Dawit Makonnen were engaged in 2014. The couple were married on 9 September 2017 in an Ethiopian Orthodox ceremony at Debre Genet Medhanealem Ethiopian Orthodox Tewahido Church in Temple Hills, Maryland. Makonnen converted from Presbyterianism to Orthodox Christianity shortly before the wedding. The wedding, which was officiated by thirteen priests, was featured in The New York Times and went viral, receiving international attention. The couple were both crowned during the ceremony per Orthodox matrimony tradition. The reception was held at Foxchase Manor in Manassas, Virginia. There were over three hundred guests at the wedding, including Prince Ermias Sahle Selassie, Prince Paul Makonnen, Prince Phillip Makonnen, Prince Beedemariam Makonnen, Princess Mary Asfaw Wossen, Johnnetta Cole, Sharon Pratt, and Brandon Todd. The wedding festivities lasted five days, from 5 September until 10 September.

In 2020, she and her husband moved to Los Angeles.
