= List of universities and colleges in Guyana =

This is a list of post-secondary institutions in the country of Guyana. Schools are listed in alphabetical order and includes non-tertiary, vocational institutions.

== Universities and colleges in Guyana include ==
=== Public Institutions ===
- University of Guyana
- Cyril Potter College of Education

=== Private Institutions ===
- Alexander American University
- American International School of Medicine
- The Business School Guyana
- Georgetown American University
- Green Heart Medical University
- Lincoln American University
- Rajiv Gandhi University of Science and Technology
- School of the Nations (Guyana)
- Texila American University

=== Trade schools ===
- Guyana Industrial Training Centre
- Government Technical Institute
- Essequibo Technical Institute
- Linden Technical Institute
- Upper Corentyne Technical Institute
- Carnegie School of Home Economics
- New Amsterdam Technical Institute
- Guyana School of Agriculture

== See also ==
- List of schools in Guyana
- List of tribal colleges and universities
- Education in Guyana
