= CSHE =

The acronym CSHE or C.S.H.E. may refer to:

- Carnegie School of Home Economics, a Guyanese service-sector trade school
- Center for the Study of Higher Education, a research center within Pennsylvania State University
- Commonwealth System of Higher Education, a university system in Pennsylvania
