= Dale Bisnauth =

Guyanese politician (1936–2013)

Minister Of Labour, Human Services, and Social Security
- In office 1992–2001
- President: Bharrat Jagdeo
- Prime Minister: Samuel Hinds

Personal details
- Born: Dale Arlington Bisnauth; 1936 Better Success, British Guiana
- Died: 4 April 2013 (aged 76–77) Georgetown, Guyana
- Party: People's Progressive Party/Civic

Dale Arlington Bisnauth (1936 – 4 April 2013) was a Guyanese politician, writer and member of the clergy. He was the Minister of Labour, Human Services, and Social Security in the Government of Guyana. Bisnauth served previously as the Guyanese Minister of Education.

== Biography ==
Dale Arlington Bisnauth was born in 1936 in Better Success, British Guyana. He studied at the Unity Theological College of the West Indies in Jamaica, graduating with a Ph.D. in History from the University of the West Indies.

Bisnauth's publications include A Short History of the Guyana Presbyterian Church (1979), History of Religions in the Caribbean (1989), and The Settlement of Indians In Guyana: 1890-1930 (2000).

Bisnauth suffered a heart attack and died at the Caribbean Heart Institute hospital in Georgetown, Guyana on 4 April 2013. He was 76. His funeral was held at Burns Memorial Presbyterian Church in Queenstown, Guyana.
