= Bobby William Austin =

American sociologist

- Born: December 29, 1944 (age 81); Bowling Green, Kentucky, U.S.
- Education: Western Kentucky University (BA); Fisk University (MA); McMaster University (PhD); Harvard Graduate School of Education; Central Michigan University (Honorary doctorate)
- Occupations: Sociologist; lecturer; writer
- Spouse: Joy Ford Austin
- Children: Ariana Austin Makonnen

Bobby William Austin (born December 29, 1944) is an American sociologist, lecturer, and writer. He is a leading scholar on African-American men and boys and was the first person, as a Program Officer with the W.K. Kellogg Foundation, to fund major philanthropic initiatives for African-American men and boys. Over the past 30 years, in the fields of education, social policy, youth development, cultural theory, philanthropy and religion, he has created a series of structured venues as pathways for how citizens might live life in communities as individuals and as members of groups where peace, meaning, and innovation are nurtured. He is currently President of the Neighborhood Associates Corporation and managing director of the EducationThinkTank.

== Education ==
Austin was born in Bowling Green, Kentucky in 1944. He received his B.A. from Western Kentucky University in sociology and economics. He went on to earn an M.A. in sociology at Fisk University and then his Ph. D. from McMaster University in Canada. He began his career as the first African-American full-time academic faculty at Georgetown University. He received a diploma from the Harvard Graduate School of Education, and an Honorary Doctorate for Public Service from Central Michigan University. He is Mahatma Gandhi Fellow of the American Academy of Political and Social Science.

== Personal life ==
Austin is married to Joy Ford, daughter of John Meredith Ford who was Lord Mayor of Georgetown, Guyana. They have a daughter, Ariana Austin, who married Prince Joel Dawit Makonnen of Ethiopia in 2017.

== Work ==
Austin served as a campaign speech writer and issues director in the mayoral campaign of Patricia Roberts Harris, as well as for Washington, D.C. mayor, Sharon Pratt. He went on to serve in various capacities at the University of the District of Columbia including Special Assistant to the Board of Trustees, Ronald H. Brown; and Special Assistant for Educational Licensure for the District of Columbia. Austin was also the founding editor of the Urban League Review, the National research and policy journal of the National Urban League. From 1990 to 1997 he was a Program Officer at the W.K. Kellogg Foundation. His roles included Director of the African American Men and Boys Initiative and assistant director of the Kellogg National Fellowship Program. As executive director of the National Task Force on African American Men and Boys he edited the groundbreaking report Repairing the Breach: Key Ways to Support Family Life, Reclaim Our Streets, and Rebuild Civil Society in America's Communities. In the study distinguished African-American leaders provide solutions to the problems faced by young black men in the U.S., based on findings by a task force assembled in 1994 by the W. K. Kellogg Foundation. Chaired by Andrew Young, the Task Force founded its carefully researched recommendations largely on grassroots programs around the country which have been successful in rebuilding lives and communities. William Raspberry, Washington Post columnist called the strategies outlined in the book, "the plan to save America."

In 1997, Austin founded the Village Foundation, an organization dedicated to "repairing the breach" between African-American males and the rest of society. Its mission was to engage African-American young men and boys in American society, by reconnecting them first to their local communities and then to the larger society. One of the leading initiatives of the Village Foundation was the "Give a Boy a Book Day campaign." The program was designed to encourage reading and literacy among young African-American men. An expert on leadership, in his article, "Twenty-First Century Leadership in the African-American Community" Austin predicted a "new and emerging leadership class" and the shift from a few national leaders to a "greater emphasis on local and regional leaders from the affected communities."

Austin is the former Chairman of the Planning Committee on the Status of African American Men, convened by Congressman Danny Davis. He is also a founding fellow of the National Endowment for the Public Trust and Director of its Justice Task Force. Austin is a founder of the People's program, convener of the civic league and its signature program "Citizens Diplomats." Austin served as a board member for the National Housing Trust, the Council for the Advancement of Adult Literacy, and currently serves on the World Policy Council of Alpha Phi Alpha fraternity. He was operational chair of the Centennial Family Symposium (2006), Alpha Phi Alpha, Inc; chairman, The Year of the African-American Male; Co-Convener of the Secretariat for African American Civil Society Leaders.

In April 2014 his work was honored at the Harvard Graduate School of Education. The Harvard University Graduate School of Education's Dean's Advisory Committee on Equity and Diversity and the Morehouse Research Institute hosted a conference reflecting on 20 years since the groundbreaking report by the National Task Force on African-American men and boys; "Repairing the Breach: Key Ways to Support Family Life, Reclaim Our Streets and Rebuild Civil Society in America's Communities." The conference honored Austin as the architect of the initiative and editor of the report. Luminaries and practitioners alike walked participants through the philosophical roots of the initiative, the future of developing grassroots leadership for African-American young men and their families, and explored the current groundswell of interest in African-American men among the philanthropic community.

Austin is listed as one of the 50 African-Americans who forever changed academia.

== Publications ==
=== Fiction ===
- Circus Clowns, Carnival Animals (Cold Tree Press, 2008)

=== Nonfiction ===
- "Point Vierge (The Virgin Point), The Contemplative Intention In Community" (in Contemplative Nation: How Ancient Practices Are Changing the Way We Live, edited by Mirabai Bush and Rob Lehman, 2011)
- I'll Make Me a World: Bringing Wholeness to Fractured Lives after 9/11 (Beckham Publications Group, 2008)
- Wake up and Start to Live: an Analysis of a Gallup Poll and a Statistical Profile of African-American Men, 1990–2000 (with Brian Gilmore and Joseph McCormick, 2003)
- "Towards a Theory of Cultural Leadership: Domestic Policy Implications as they Relate to Black Ethnic Groups in America" (in Concepts, Challenges, and Realities of Leadership: An International Perspective, edited by James MacGregor Burns, 2001)
- "Twenty-first Century Leadership in the African-American Community" with Andrew Young (in The Community of the Future, edited by Frances Hesselbein, 2000)
- Repairing the Breach: Key Ways to Support Family Life, Reclaim our Streets and Rebuild Civil Society in American Communities (1996)
- What a Piece of Work is Man (monograph, 1992)
