= Mona Williams (writer, born 1943) =

Guyanese–New Zealand writer (born 1943)

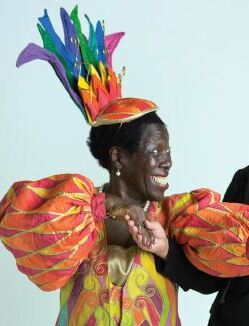
- Williams on the poster for Once Upon a Dance (2018)
- Born: 27 July 1943 (age 83); Mackenzie, British Guiana
- Citizenship: Guyanese; New Zealand
- Education: Stanford University (BA)
- Occupations: Children's author; memoirist; oral storyteller; educator
- Children: 2

Mona Annette Williams (born 27 July 1943) is a Guyanese–New Zealand children's author, memoirist, oral storyteller and educator. Born in British Guiana, Williams has lived and worked in New Zealand since 1971, and performed in storytelling festivals around the world. Her performances incorporate music and dance. She has written over 24 stories for children, usually published in the New Zealand School Journal, and published an autobiography in 1995 about her experiences attending a colonial school in Guyana.

== Early life and education ==
Mona Williams was born in the township of Mackenzie in the colony of British Guiana in what is now Linden, Guyana, on 27 July 1943. She is Jewish and of African descent; her family surname Williams derives from the slave owners of her ancestors. She attended Bishops' High School on a scholarship. In interviews, she has expressed that as a black student, she found attending a predominantly white colonial school challenging, although she found solace in learning ballet and traditional dance. Her experiences there formed the basis for her 1995 autobiography, Bishops: My Turbulent Colonial Youth, which was serialised for Radio New Zealand.

Williams graduated from Stanford University with a bachelor of arts degree in mass communications, attending on both Ford Foundation and Fulbright Program scholarships. She has said that when she arrived in New Zealand, her degree was regarded as fake and called a "wanky Yankee" degree.

== Storytelling and educating career ==
Williams began working as a radio presenter in Guyana around 1965, and found that she had spare airtime so began telling her own children's stories. She has said that her children's stories were often veiled commentary on Guyana's struggle for independence. While studying at Stanford she worked in radio and television in San Francisco, and her storytelling programme Roots and Branches, broadcast on KQED, won a local Emmy award in 1971.

Williams moved to New Zealand in 1971, following her marriage to a New Zealander, and became a New Zealand citizen in 1979. While her two daughters were young, she wrote for the New Zealand School Journal, and she has also had work published in the New Zealand Listener. In 1984 she collaborated with children's writer Joy Cowley on the short story collection Two of a Kind. She was the 1993 writer-in-residence at the University of Waikato. Diane Hebley, in The Oxford Companion to New Zealand Literature, notes that due to Williams' African and Jewish heritage, she "brings perspectives that are unusual in New Zealand".

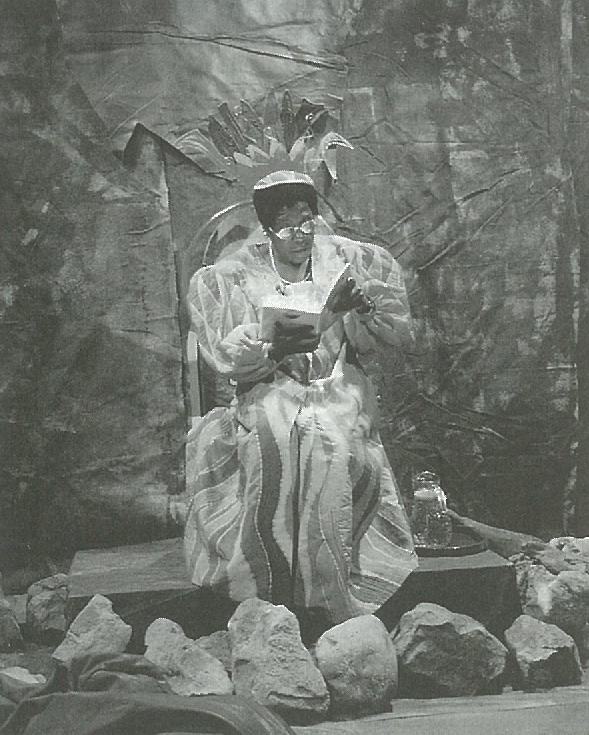
Williams reading The Lord of the Rings at Palmerston North Public Library in 2000

Over the last fifty years Williams has regularly performed as an oral storyteller at festivals around New Zealand and internationally, and at schools as part of the Writers in Schools programme run by Read NZ Te Pou Muramura. She has said it takes her around seven months to write, rehearse and produce a show. Her storytelling performances incorporate music and dance. She has also worked as a teacher in primary schools, and lectured at the Palmerston North College of Education, later Massey University, retiring from this role in 2002.

In 2018, she collaborated with Jan Bolwell on the autobiographical play Once Upon a Dance, performed by them both at Te Whaea in Wellington and at the Globe Theatre and Regent on Broadway in Palmerston North. Williams and Bolwell were both members of the Crows Feet Dance Collective, a contemporary dance company of older women based in Wellington. In November 2023, she presented the annual Panui lecture for Read NZ Te Pou Muramura at the National Library of New Zealand. Her lecture was published as Tell Us a Story Out of Your Own Mouth and is dedicated to her ancestors.

Williams has travelled widely including ten years teaching writing in Kuwait, and performing throughout Europe, including at the Dunya Festival in 1999 in Rotterdam. In response to a question in 2002 about why she became a writer, Williams said:

I did not have a conscious wish to write. I wrote because I had to — I was broke and needed money. Then I was in pain, emotionally, and had to write, to make sure that I became able to understand my life. Then I found I could not stop writing.

== Selected works ==
Her published works are predominantly for children, and include:

- "How We Made a Colour Television Show" (1973)
- "The Turtle Who Longed to be a Bird" (1973)
- "Christmas in Guyana" (1974)
- "The Day I Swam the River" (1974)
- "How the Goat Lost His Voice" (1974)
- "Old Medicine" (1974)
- "The Ant Who Refused Titles" (1975)
- "Granny" (1975)
- "Father Martin Heale" (1975)
- "Old Bell" (1975)
- "When I Went to the Pictures" (1975)
- "Stealing the Gooseberry Jam" (1975)
- "Thinking About It" (1975)
- "Speaking the Truth" (1975)
- "You Really Saw My Father?" (1976)
- "A Tale to Match" (1977)
- "Spell Wool" (1977)
- "Sharing" (1977)
- "The Outsider" (1977)
- "Secrets" (1978)
- "The Bicycle" (1978)
- "Old Mrs Davidson" (1983)
- "The Strange Cure" (1984)
- Two of a Kind (short story collection, with Joy Cowley) (1984)
- Bishops: My Turbulent Colonial Youth (autobiography, 1995)

== See also ==
Brenda DoHarris is a writer who was also born in 1943 and she writes about attending the same school.

== Bibliography ==
- Williams, Mona (2023). Tell Us a Story Out of Your Own Mouth. Read NZ Te Pou Muramura. ISBN 978-0-473-68986-5.
