= School of the Nations =

School of the Nations may refer to:

- School of the Nations (Guyana)
- School of the Nations (Macau) (Portuguese name: Escola das Nações)
- School of the Nations (Bahá'í – Brazil) (Portuguese name: Escola das Nações)
- School of the Nation (SON), a Cambridge-curriculum school in Banasree, Dhaka, Bangladesh
