= Joel Dawit Makonnen =

Member of the Ethiopian Imperial Family

Prince Joel
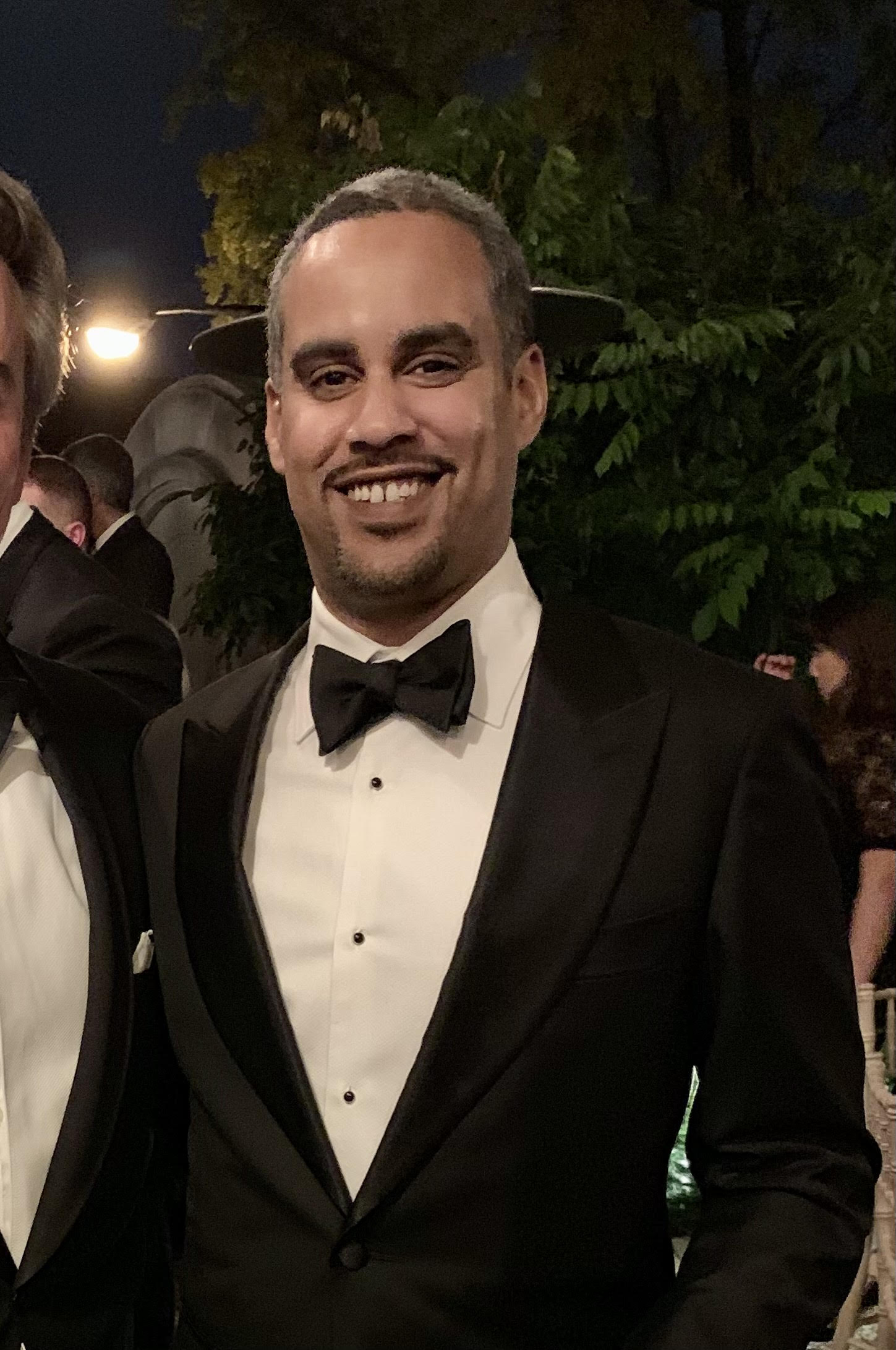
- Makonnen at the 51st Annual Meridian Ball in October 2019
- Born: Yoel Dawit Makonnen Haile Selassie; 5 May 1982 (age 44); Rome, Italy
- Spouse: Ariana Joy Lalita Austin (m. 2017)
- House: Solomon
- Father: Prince David Makonnen
- Mother: Princess Adey Imru Makonnen
- Religion: Ethiopian Orthodox
- Occupation: Attorney, businessman, philanthropist, writer
- Education: American University (BS); Howard University (JD)

Prince Joel David Makonnen Haile Selassie (Yoel Dawit Makonnen Haile Selassie; born 5 May 1982) is an attorney, businessman, philanthropist, writer, and member of the Ethiopian Imperial House of Solomon. He is the great-grandson of Haile Selassie I, the last Emperor of Ethiopia.

Makonnen was born in exile in Rome and grew up in Switzerland and France, attending both the Collège du Léman in Geneva and Sainte Croix des Neiges in Haute Savoie. In 1999, he returned to Ethiopia with his mother, living in Addis Ababa. He moved to the United States and, in 2009, worked as the director of grants for Humanities DC, a non-profit affiliate of the National Endowment for the Humanities. He was a legal intern at the United Nations in 2011 and worked as a law clerk in international trade and equal opportunity employment in 2013. Since 2017, Makonnen has served as a legal aid and corporate counsel for Otsuka Pharmaceutical.

He is the co-founder and director of Alchemy World Projects USA, an educational and entrepreneurship organization that serves impoverished youth in Ethiopia, and is the co-founder of the media company Old World/New World Productions, which he launched with his wife, Ariana Austin Makonnen. In 2021, he co-authored a children's novel with Kwame Mbalia titled Last Gate of the Emperor.

== Early life and family ==
Makonnen was born in exile in Rome, Italy in 1982. His parents, Prince David Makonnen and Princess Adey Imru Makonnen, were exiled from Ethiopia during the 1974 communist revolution, while other members of the family were also exiled, imprisoned, or executed. He is the youngest child of Prince David and Princess Adey. He has an older brother, Prince Yokshan Makonnen. His paternal grandparents are Prince Makonnen Haile Selassie, Duke of Harar and Sara Gizaw. His great-grandparents, Haile Selassie I and Menen Asfaw, were the last Emperor and Empress of Ethiopia. His father died from health complications in 1989 while in exile in Switzerland. In 1993 Makonnen came to Ethiopia for the first time to visit his family after members of the Imperial family were released from prison and their properties were restored to them. In 1999 Makonnen moved to Addis Ababa with his mother, who was working with the United Nations, and lived there for two years.

== Education ==
Makonnen was educated in Switzerland and France, having attended the boarding schools Collège du Léman in Geneva and Sainte Croix des Neiges in Abondance, Haute-Savoie. In 1999 he moved to Ethiopia and attended the International Community School of Addis Ababa until 2001. In 2001, he enrolled at the Euro-American Institute of Technology in Sophia Antipolis, France. In 2003, he transferred to American University in Washington, D.C., where he earned a bachelor of science degree in business administration with a focus on international business from the Kogod School of Business. In 2015, he obtained a Juris Doctor from Howard University's School of Law.

== Career ==
In 2009 Makonnen began working as the director of grants for Humanities DC, a non-profit affiliate of the National Endowment for the Humanities. He was a legal intern at the United Nations in 2011 before working as a law clerk in international trade and equal opportunity employment in 2013. From 2016 until 2017 Makonnen was a compliance project manager at a real estate corporation. Since 2017 he has worked for Otsuka Pharmaceutical as a legal aid and corporate counsel. Makonnen is the board director and a co-owner of the Wabe Shebelle Hotel in Addis Ababa. He is also a co-founder and the country director of Alchemy World Projects USA, a non-governmental organization focused on creating schools and entrepreneurship curriculums for impoverished youth in Ethiopia.

On August 10, 2018, Makonnen wrote an op-ed for True Africa about political change, national unity, and social progress in Ethiopia.

In November 2018, Makonnen and his wife launched Old World/New World Productions, a media company that produces documentaries, feature films, and television shows focused on Africa and the African diaspora. In 2021, Makonnen co-authored a children's book with Kwame Mbalia titled Last Gate of the Emperor.

== Personal life ==
Makonnen met American philanthropist Ariana Joy Lalita Austin, daughter of Bobby William Austin and Joy Ford Austin, at Pearl nightclub in Washington, D.C., in December 2005. They got engaged in 2014. Makonnen and Austin were married on September 9, 2017, in an Ethiopian Orthodox ceremony at Debre Genet Medhanealem Ethiopian Orthodox Tewahido Church in Temple Hills, Maryland. Their wedding was featured in The New York Times and went viral, receiving international attention. The wedding was officiated by thirteen priests and included a coronation ceremony where both the bride and groom were crowned. Their wedding reception was held at Foxchase Manor in Manassas, Virginia. Over three hundred guests attended the five days of wedding festivities, which correlated with the Ethiopian New Year, starting on September 5 and ending on September 10. Guests included Prince Ermias Sahle Selassie, Prince Paul Makonnen, Prince Phillip Makonnen, Prince Beedemariam Makonnen, Princess Mary Asfaw Wossen, Johnnetta Cole, Sharon Pratt, and Brandon Todd.

Makonnen speaks English, Amharic, French, Italian and Spanish.

== Titles and styles ==
Makonnen uses the style His Imperial Highness with the title Prince Joel David Makonnen Haile Selassie of Ethiopia.
