= Winifred Gaskin =

Guyanese educator, journalist and politician

Minister of Education, Youth, Race Relations & Community Development
- In office 1964–1973
- Prime Minister: Forbes Burnham
- Preceded by: Brindley Horatio Benn
- Succeeded by: C.L. Baird

Personal details
- Born: Winifred Ivy Thierens; 10 May 1916 Buxton, British Guiana
- Died: 5 March 1977 (aged 60) Georgetown, Guyana
- Party: People's National Congress
- Occupation: teacher, journalist, politician

Winifred Gaskin, CCH, OD (10 May 1916 – 5 March 1977) was an Afro-Guyanese educator, journalist and civil servant who entered politics. After a career in public service, she was appointed the first high commissioner of Guyana to the Commonwealth Caribbean Countries organization. Her dedication to public service was honored with the Jamaican Order of Distinction and the Cacique's Crown of Honour, Guyana's second highest service award.

== Early life ==
Winifred Ivy Thierens was born on 10 May 1916 in Buxton, British Guiana to Irene and Stanley Thierens. Her father was the headmaster of St. Anthony’s Catholic School in Buxton, which she attended. After completing her primary schooling, Thierens won a scholarship to attend St. Joseph Convent School in Georgetown. She finished her secondary schooling at Bishops' High School after completing her Senior Cambridge examinations.

== Career ==
Thierens began her career in civil service, but soon transferred to teaching. She taught at the St. Mary’s Roman Catholic School, eventually returning to government service in the District Commissioner's Office. When she married Berkeley Gaskin in 1939, she was barred from working as a civil servant because she was no longer single and returned to teaching, taking a post at St. Joseph, her alma mater. Joining the British Guiana Women's League of Social Services, she became active in improving prospects for women in the country.

In 1944, Gaskin began working for the Bureau of Public Information and wrote for The Argosy newspaper. Continuing her interest in women's rights, in 1946 she co-founded the Women's Political and Economic Organisation (WPEO) with Janet Jagan. The goals of the organization were to seek equal access to socio-economic and political spheres of society, as well as being able to vote. They also attempted to mobilize and educate women on civic roles and duties, urging them to become involved by improving their skills. Later that same year, she joined the Political Affairs Committee (PAC), forerunner to the People's Progressive Party (PPP), to press for universal suffrage.

Full enfranchisement for adults was granted in 1953 in British Guiana and Gaskin decided to further her education. She applied for and was accepted on a British Council scholarship to work in London at The Times and the Daily Express and learn more about the newspaper business. She was particularly interested in writing about political developments, such as the suspension of the constitution of British Guiana in 1953. After two years abroad, she returned to Guiana and began working at Booker News. Working her way up the ladder, she soon became deputy editor and then the editor of the newspaper. She also served as president of the British Guiana Press Association.

When the PPP split over platform disputes and election losses in 1955, Gaskin joined the predominantly Afro-Guyanese People's National Congress (PNC). One of the founding members of the party led by Forbes Burnham, Gaskin helped found the women's arm of the party, Women's Auxiliary Movement, when the PNC was officially founded in 1957. Appointed chair of the PNC in 1961, Gaskin, the first woman to chair the party, was the only woman present at the Guyana independence negotiations held the following year in London.

In 1964, when the PNC won the election, she was appointed the Minister of Education, Youth and Community Development, the first woman to serve as a Minister in the PNC administration and the first black woman to serve as a cabinet member in the country's history. She targeted curriculum reform, focusing her programs to create textbooks with culturally relevant themes, reorganize the teaching hierarchy and qualification, and build new schools. In a controversial move, she proposed that the largely parochial schools throughout the country be nationalized as public schools and religious education be removed from the curricula. She also worked on initiatives to strengthen the ties between the various Caribbean countries, as they gained their independence from Britain.

In 1968, Gaskin was appointed the first high commissioner of Guyana to the Commonwealth Caribbean Countries organization, headquartered in Jamaica. She was honored the Jamaican Order of Distinction and in 1974 received the Cacique's Crown of Honour, Guyana's second highest service award. Returning to Guyana in 1976, she was appointed to head the Ministry of Foreign Affairs.

== Death and legacy ==
Gaskin died on 5 March 1977 in Georgetown, Guyana. The Manchester Government School was posthumously renamed in her honor in 1978. In 2011, she was honored at a ceremony held to recognize women's accomplishments for International Women's Day. Her portrait was presented and mounted on a street bearing her name in her home town of Buxton.
