= St. Stanislaus College (Guyana) =

Location
- 4 (Demerara-Mahaica); Georgetown; Guyana; 6.80842°N 58.16546°W

Information
- School type: Senior Secondary
- Motto: Aeterna Non Caduca ("Not for this life only, but for eternity")
- Established: 1 May 1866
- Founder: Fr. Theobald Langton, SJ
- Oversight: m
- Superintendent: m
- Administrator: Mr. Hart
- Headmistress: Mrs. Roxanne Lafleur-Foster
- Faculty: 45
- Grades: 7-12
- Gender: Coeducational
- Age range: 11-17
- Enrollment: 500-600
- Average class size: 25-40
- Hours in school day: 7
- Classrooms: 3-4 classrooms per form
- Houses: Ethridge, Butler, Galton, Weld
- Colours: Royal blue and silver
- Song: "Saint of our Youth"
- Nickname: Saints
- Team name: Saints United (basketball)
- Rival: Saint Roses (basketball)
- National ranking: third
- School fees: None
- Alumni: Andrew Morrison
- Toronto Alumni Chapter - http://www.torontosaints.com/

St. Stanislaus College is a Grade-A senior secondary school in Georgetown, Guyana. It has a student population of 600 and a teaching staff of about 40. Admission to the school is normally through the Secondary Schools' Entrance Examination. It is the third highest school in the country, following Queen's College and Bishops' High School.

In 2018, St. Stanislaus College students attained a 96.23% passing rate in the Caribbean Secondary Education Certificate examinations and 96.03% in the Caribbean Advanced Proficiency Examination.

== History ==
St. Stanislaus Grammar School was established on 1 May 1866 as a Jesuit all-boys school. It was founded by Father Langthon and named after Stanislaus Kostka. The school moved to Brickdam 1907, and in 1913 survived a fire. It was expanded with a new wing in 1954 and earned government funding 1957. The Hopkinson was added in 1973. In 1975 the school became co-ed, and it was made a public school in 1976. The Jesuits stopped running the college in 1980. A board of governors was installed in the school in 2005.

== Facilities ==
The college has three science laboratories. There is a library, a geography room, Home Economics department and an Industrial Arts department. The campus has two computer laboratories, a bursary (which sells school supplies) and a sick bay. The school has a hard court that is used for cricket, football and volleyball. It also has a basketball court It also has a forum called the Marian Forum which is used as a small indoor hockey court.

A playing-field near the Sea Wall to the north of the city on Carifesta Avenue is owned by the college and serves as a common location for the annual school sports.

In 1975, the government under president Forbes Burnham initiated a focus on domestic agriculture so the headmaster of the college established a farm in Sophia for school use. It is a mixed-use farm, equipped with a laboratory for students’ use, and owned by the St Stanislaus Alumni Association. Hydroponics were set up in 2005. The farm is for public use, but is also used by various organizations including Partners of the Americas and Caribbean Self-Reliance International and the Guyana School of Agriculture. The farm also has livestock and produces paneer for the local market.

== Athletics ==
The college maintains an athletics program, competing at inter-school and national levels across a range of disciplines including cricket, volleyball, basketball, hockey and football, alongside a competitive chess team.

=== House system ===
There are four houses — Galton (green), Butler (blue), Weld (yellow) and Etheridge (red).

== Notable alumni ==
- Irfaan Ali – President of Guyana
- Andrew Morrison – Jesuit priest, journalist and pro-democracy activist
- Geoffrey Da Silva – politician and public administrator
- Loren Miller – medical professional and philanthropist

== See also ==
- List of Jesuit sites
- List of schools in Guyana
