= Education financing in Guyana =

Guyana's record GDP growth positions it as one of the fastest-growing economies, due to the discovery of significant offshore-oil reserves. Such increases in government revenue have enabled opportunities for public investment. This has allowed for increased expenditure in education. The previous limitations of colonial legacies, and socio-economic inequality, inadequate infrastructure, and limitations in resource distribution hindered access to education and its subsequent quality. This article examines education financing in Guyana, including its historical background, government expenditure, household contributions, private and non-state provisions, and international aid. In addition, It examines economic factors, such as debt servicing, International Monetary Fund (IMF) and World Bank conditionalities, and illicit financial flows, which have influenced the financing, quality, and outcomes of education in Guyana.

== Historical background ==
=== Colonial period (1807–1966) ===
Formal education in Guyana began in 1807. Education for the enslaved African and Indigenous populations was kept to a minimum and was provided only as required to maintain and reproduce the colonial labour force. In 1835, the British government subsidised the Negro Education Grant to support educational work conducted by Christian missionary organisations during the post-emancipation period. The expansion of religious educational institutions increased access to education for the Afro-Guyanese population. Aid was allocated to compulsory education, teacher training, and infrastructure which totalled £235,000 for all the ex-slave colonies in the span of 10 years. Some historians suggest that these educational initiatives were designed, at least in part, to maintain public order, rather than to provide welfare.

The 1876 Educational Ordinance expanded school accessibility in urban areas by introducing mandatory education. Under the act, schooling became compulsory for children up to age 12 in rural areas and age 14 in Georgetown. This was financed by the British colonial government but the act also prohibited grant-aided schools from charging fees for elementary education.

In the post-World War II era, a push towards industrialisation, influenced by economic developments in the United States and the Caribbean, combined with waves of political independence movements, led to increased educational enrolment and rapid growth in education expenditure. During this period such expenditure reached around 11% of annual government spending.

=== Independence and cooperative socialism (1966–1985) ===
Guyana achieved independence in 1966. By 1967, private education was abolished from nursery through to university. During this time, educational expenditure increased to 17 percent of annual government spending. Such expenditure aimed at building the emergent nation after a legacy of educational neglect bequeathed under colonialism. Cooperative socialism shaped the education system under the Prime Minister Forbes Burnham and the People's National Congress (PNC) from 1971 to 1985. The following changes happened throughout socialist Guyana: the nationalisation of privately run schools, the expansion of access to mass education, establishing new teacher training colleges, making schools coeducational, and creating a new elite secondary school, the President’s College that did not charge fees.

The severe economic crisis that resulted from the slowdown of industrial markets during the 1970s destabilised many developing countries, including Guyana which in turn threatened political stability. As governments shifted spending towards rapid military expansion, commitments to universal education weakened. Subsequently, education expenditure fell to 12.8 percent of the national budget by 1976.

Furthermore, the nationalisation of almost all major foreign-owned businesses led to government price controls, restrictions on imports and exports, and limited access to foreign currency. As a result, many people turned to smuggling goods and trading foreign currency illegally on a parallel market. In 1973, Norman Girvan and Michel Vale argued that nationalised industries were frequently managed by individuals selected for their political loyalty and, in some cases, ethnic affiliation rather than their technical expertise. As such, the performance of many state-owned enterprises was weakened

During the late 1970s, the Prime Minister Forbes Burnham faced a balance of payments deficit and rising external debt obligations. As a result, the government sought out the International Monetary Fund (IMF) and World Bank but failure to meet conditionalities, led to the discontinuation of credit lines. Rising global oil prices, between 1979 and 1981, significantly increased Guyana's import costs, worsening an already struggling economy and creating a large fiscal deficit. To finance this deficit, the government borrowed money from the central bank, which contributed to inflation and made it even more difficult for Guyana to pay for imports and repay its foreign debts.

=== Structural adjustment and privatisation (1985–1999) ===
The subsequent administration of Desmond Hoyte in 1985, transitioned its social policies and increasingly relied on the World Bank and IMF loans. Nationalisation was halted which resulted in the privatisation of much of the public sector. By 1988, the domestic economy had contracted significantly, with the national Gross Domestic Product (GDP) declining to 68 percent of its 1976 level. Guyanas external debt exceeded 600 percent of its GDP, while outstanding arrears on external debt amounted to US$885 million. This was approximately four times the total value of national exports. International lenders were unwilling to extend further credit lines. The state also lacked the capital necessary to maintain centralised funding for education institutions resulting in a 5.5% education spending between 1989 and 1992.

A long term policy shift toward deregulation, and increased private-sector participation in the previously public sphere, coincided with reliance on international financial institutions. This shift continued after Cheddi Jagan took office in 1992.

As part of austerity measures, the University of Guyana (UG), founded in 1963 as a free public institution, began charging tuition in 1994. In 1998 government expenditure had improved to 12.8 percent, but this still relatively low expenditure resulted in low teacher pay, poor infrastructure and limited education materials.

=== Pre-oil economy (2000–2019) ===
From 2000, until oil production began in 2019, economic growth remained unremarkable. Education spending as a share of GDP, however, fluctuated significantly during this period.

== Challenges ==
=== Regional inequality ===
The IMF's 2005 Poverty Reduction Strategy Paper outlined education as a major priority to reduce poverty. The paper also suggested that commitments to reduce dropout rates, improving enrolment and increasing literacy would strengthen Guyana's education system. This highlighted that budget constraints, and the limited delivery of education services were prevalent before the discovery of oil reserves. Nationally, secondary enrolment rose from 54.5% to 65% in the decades prior to 2005, yet progress was uneven, and the hinterland consistently lagged the national average. The report attributed the gap to structural factors, such as the terrain, population dispersion, and teacher recruitment, in addition to the overall size of the education budget. The manifestation of these limitations was exemplified during the COVID-19 pandemic, where many households in the rural hinterland lacked the internet connection in their homes needed to participate in online learning.

=== High emigration ===
Guyana's brain drain refers to the large-scale emigration of skilled professionals out of the country. As of 2022, an estimated 90% of Guyanese with tertiary education and 40% of those with secondary education live abroad. This long-running trend stems from the political instability, economic decline, and limited opportunity, that was especially prevalent during the economic collapse and political unrest of the 1970s–1990s. Guyana's loss of skilled professionals mirrors a pattern across. the Caribbean, where the tertiary emigration rates remain among the highest in the world. The loss of elites and highly educated individuals shaped how governments approach education funding. A 2018 study of CARICOM education policy found that steady losses of skilled citizens exert pressure on public funding commitments to tertiary education. Student loan schemes especially remain constrained as non-repayment by emigrated graduates reduces the funding available to subsequent students.

== Country spend ==
=== Government spending ===
The United Nations Sustainable Development Goal 4 (SDG 4) recommends governments to reach two key financing targets for public education.

- Allocate at least 4% to 6% of your country's Gross Domestic Product (GDP) to education
- Allocate at least 15% to 20% of total public government expenditure to education

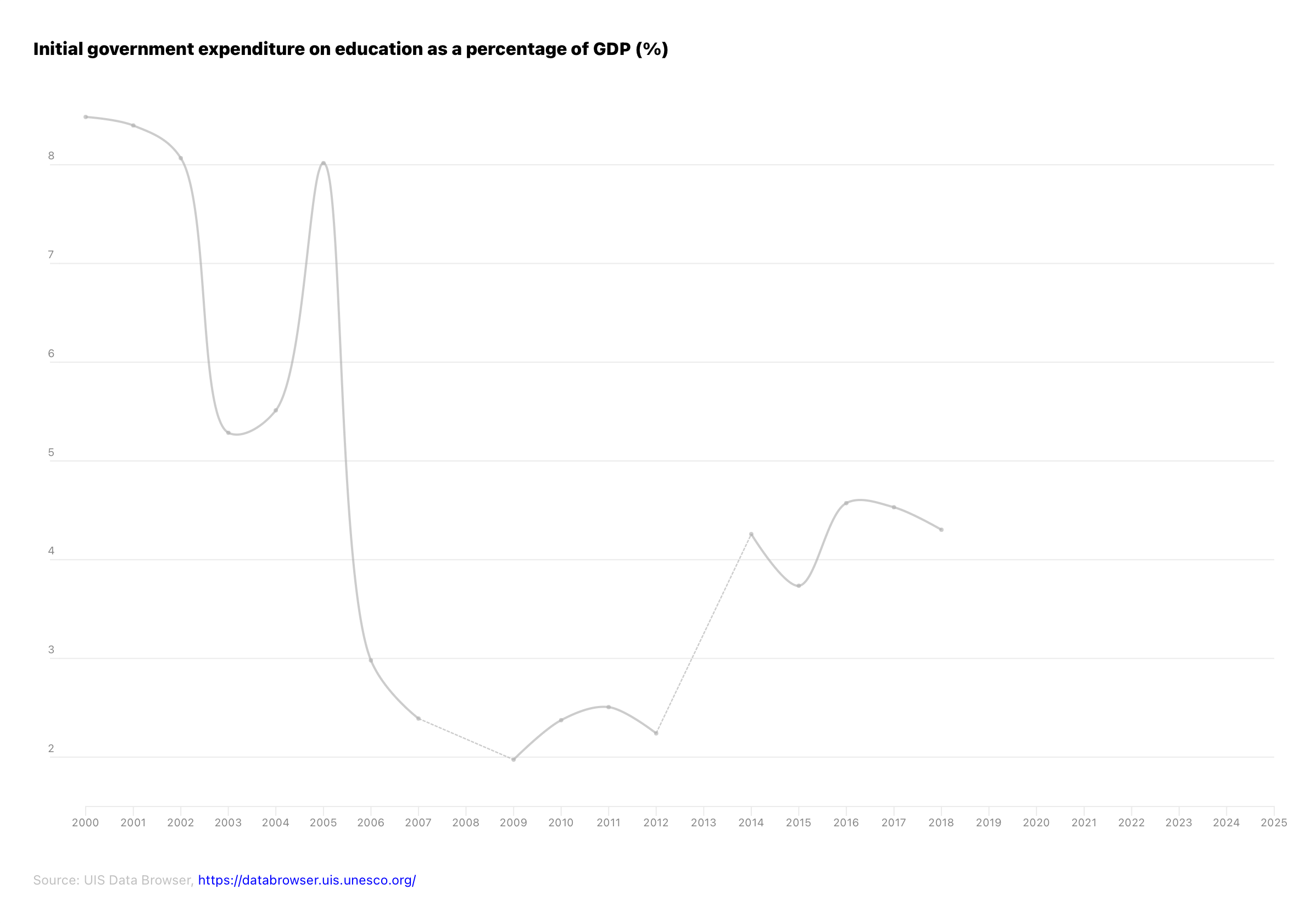
Initial government expenditure on education as a percentage of GDP (%) 2000 to 2025

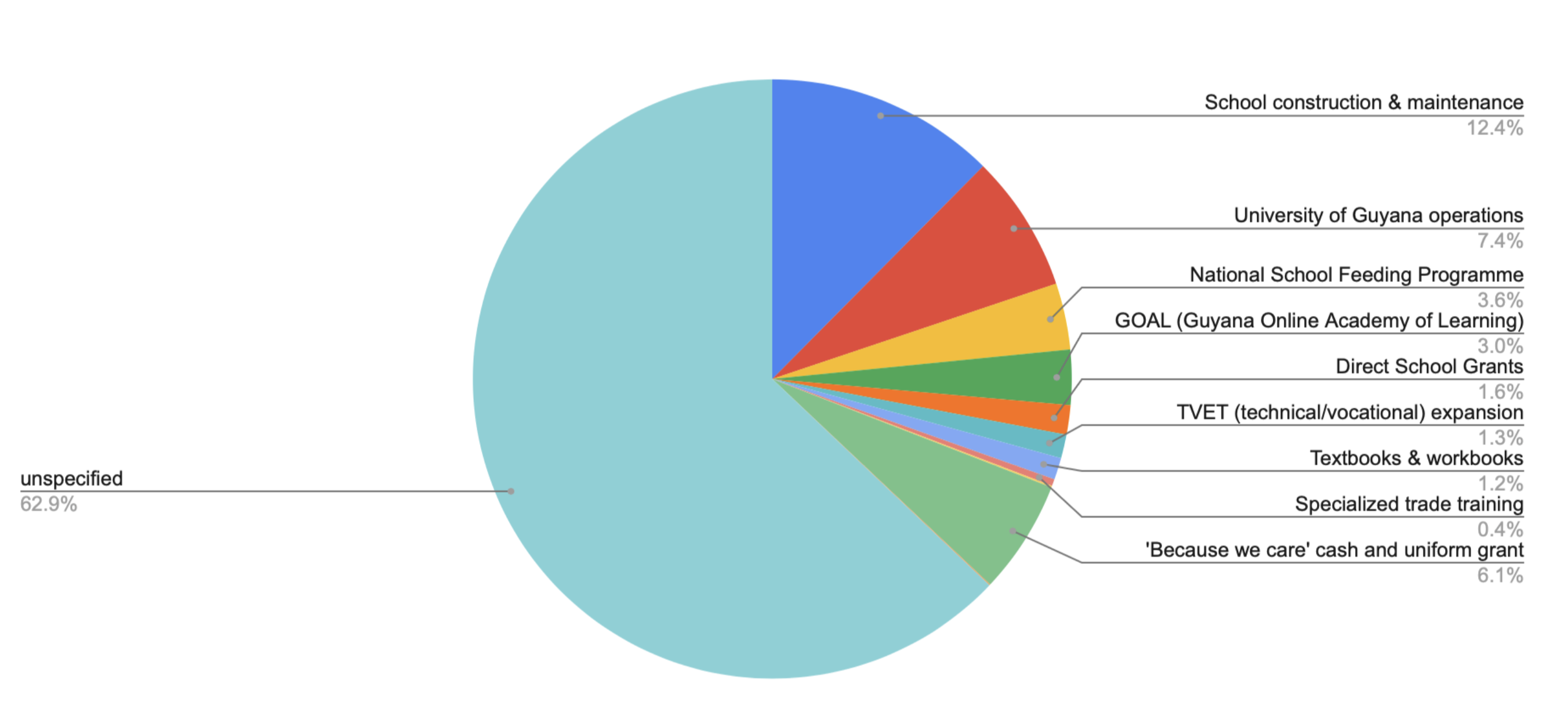
Guyana's education budget allocation 2026

The UNESCO Institute for Statistics data depicts large fluctuations in government expenditure in education as a percentage of GDP. Government expenditure as a percent of GDP was at 8.6% in 1999. This fell to 2.1% by 2009, and then began gradually increasing to 4.5% by 2018.

The Ministry of Education's 2021–2025 Education Sector Plan projected that education expenditure would rise to nearly 6% of GDP by the end of the plan period. This was based on conservative growth assumptions. However, the ministry noted that the education system did not have the absorptive capacity to effectively utilise higher levels such a high influx of funds at the time. Guyana's GDP grew by 43.8% in 2024 and 19.3% in 2025

Guyana's total education budget for 2026 is GYD $183.6 billion. The ten notable projects listed account for roughly a third of that total. The GYD $123 billion unaccounted for likely reflects recurrent expenditure such as teacher and staff salaries, school administration, utilities, and infrastructure maintenance and other ongoing costs.

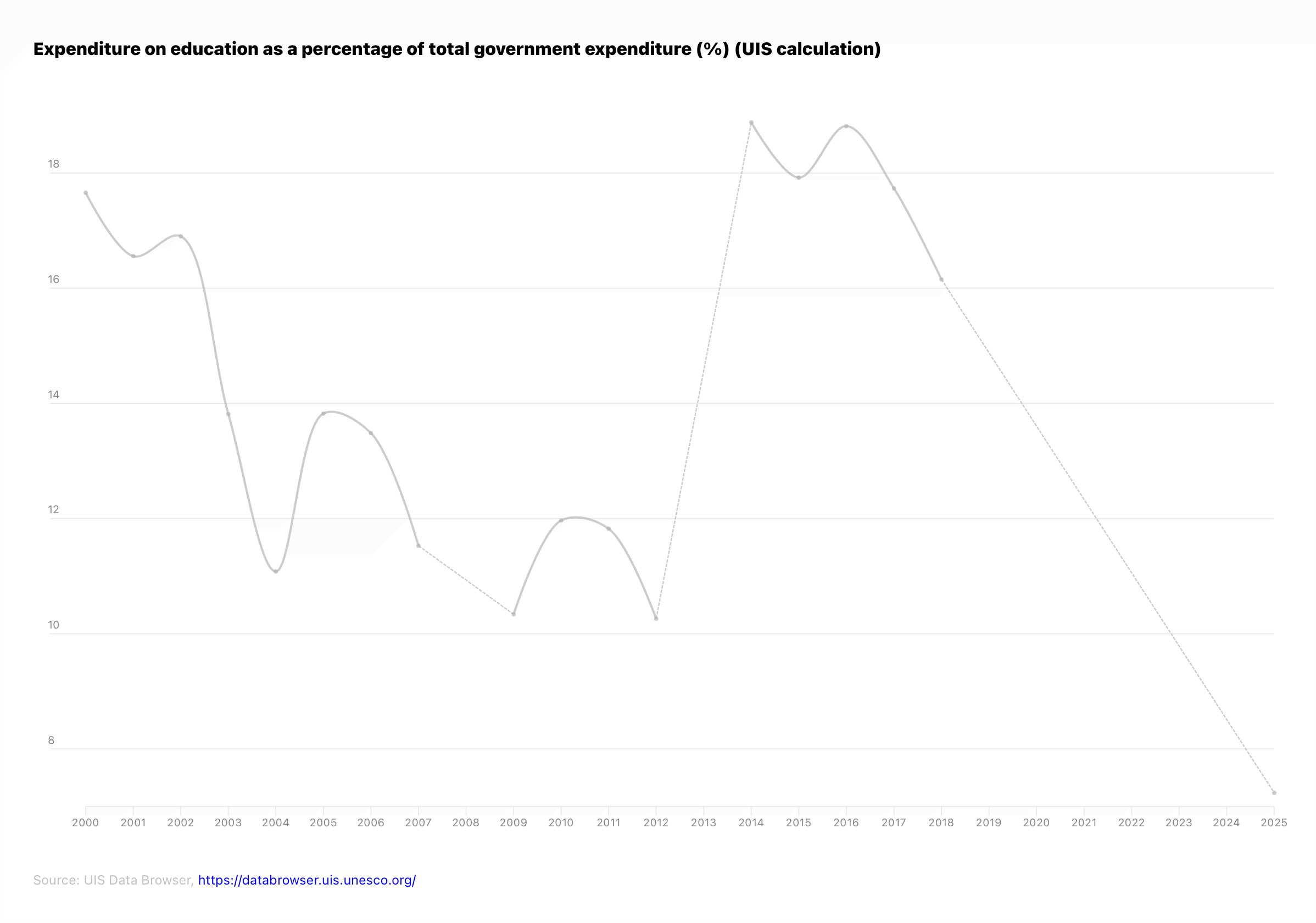
Guyana's expenditure on education as a percentage of total government expenditure (%) (UIS calculation)

infrastructure projects (GYD $24.3 billion) accounts for the completion of 40+ schools nationwide. In addition, higher education and scholarships (GYD $20.3 billion) is demarcated for university operations and Guyana's Online Academy of Learning (GOAL) scholarships.

From 2021 to 2026, teacher salaries rose 55-60%. The number of trained teachers has tripled since the pre-oil-boom era, with annual teacher graduates exceeding 1,500.

Literacy rates have also risen over the same period. As of 2020, Guyana's literacy rate 99 % between ages 15-24. This is an improvement from the 2012 census that indicated a 90 percent national literacy rate, estimating a 10 percent illiteracy in the coastal areas and 16.5% illiteracy in the hinterland (aged 15-24). Zelleyne Jennings, however, argued that functional literacy rates remain low, noting that national literacy tests rely on short, everyday sentences that may not reflect applied literacy skills. Estimates in 2000, suggested only 11% of youth aged 14-25 showed a high level of functional literacy. This was measured by their ability to apply literacy to skills of calculation, problem solving and reading.

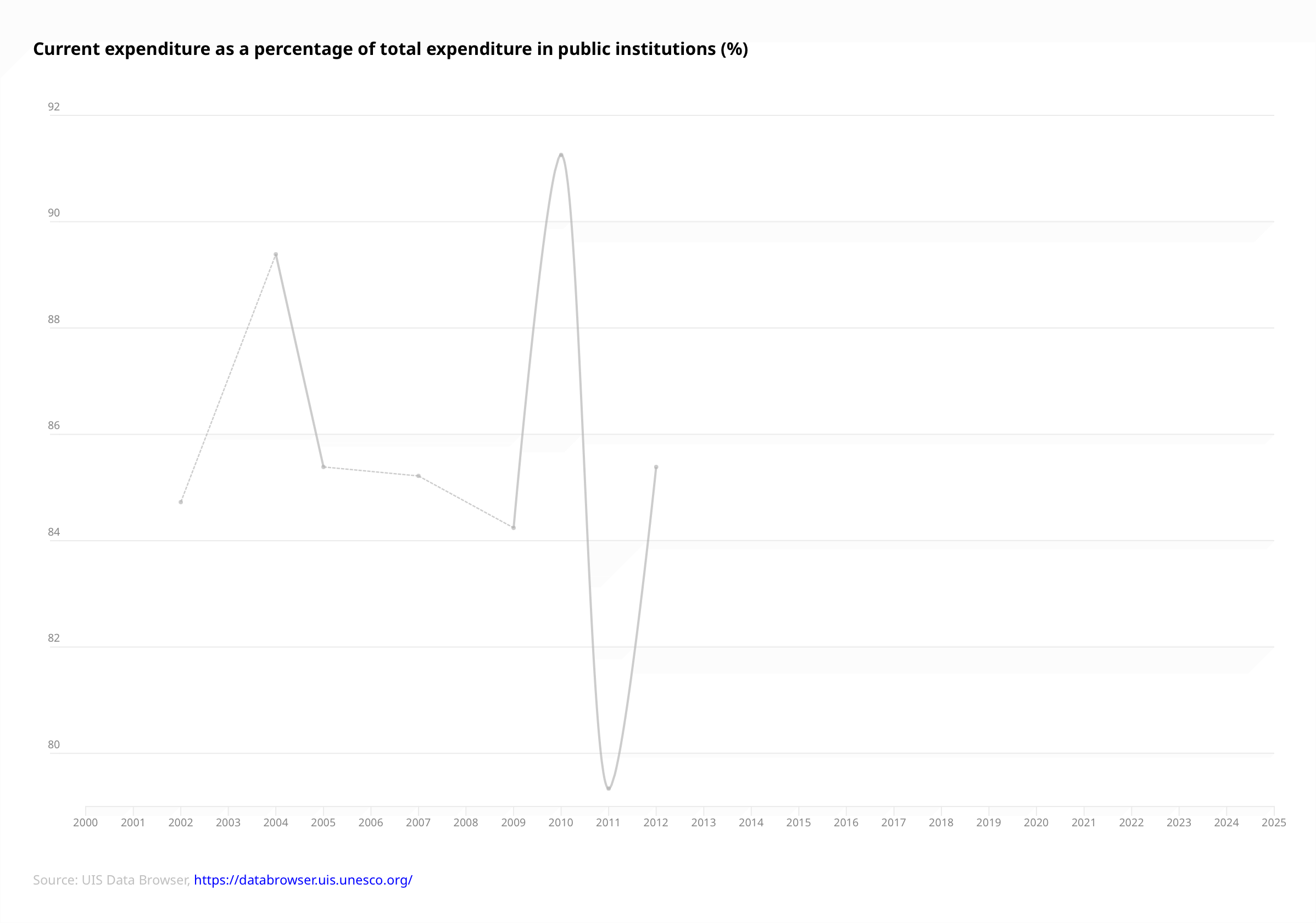
Guyana's current expenditure as a percentage of total expenditure in public institutions (%)

On a per-student basis, average annual expenditure on a per student basis is approximately GYD $221,000 for nursery students, GYD $156,000 for primary students, and GYD 190,000 for secondary students.

Government expenditure on education as a percentage of total government expenditure declined from 18.3% in 2020 to approximately 13% in 2024. As of 2025, the total government expenditure on education was 7.2% of total government expenditure. Rather than a reduction in the dollar amount spent on schools, this percentage decline reflects a 307% increase in overall national budgets between 2021 and 2026 as a result of large sums in oil revenues.

=== Private and non state provisions ===
The low registration rates of private schools hiders the tracking of private investment in Guyana. As of 2017, only 57% of private schools are registered with the Guyana Revenue Authority, and only 20% of these schools are estimated to be officially recognised by the Ministry of Education. Keeping this in mind, the ministry of education reported 5% of total institutions were private. Most private education providers focus on early childhood and primary schooling while the government remains the primary provider for all other educational levels.

Private-public partnerships have also begun playing a key role in educational initiatives. For instance, The Greater Guyana Initiative (GGI) is a 10 year development program that is allocating USD $100 towards education in Guyana. It is funded by ExxonMobil Guyana, Hess Guyana, and CNOOC Petroleum. GGIs partnerships with the local NGO Recover Guyana and the Ministry of Education, enabled the launching of Project FLOW. This initiative has implement renewable, solar-powered water purification systems in 15 public secondary schools across Region 3. This project provided access to drinking water without plastic packing for 9,000 students and teachers around Guyana.

These partnerships have been associated with efforts to expand STEM education, integrate digital technologies into the curriculum, and assist infrastructure projects within the education system. The guardian notes that the private sectors participation in education, influenced the cirriculums in certain universities. The article discussed the participation of ExxonMobil in American higher education and raised concerns over the say corporations should have; such as whether such funding has inherent conditionalities associated with it.

=== Household expenditure ===
Household contributions to education are associated with both direct costs and underlying, non-monetary costs. Direct expenses include school supplies, uniforms, transportation, and examination fees, while non-monetary costs include student travel time and family labor dedicated to supporting education. For low-income households, these combined factors hinder enrolment and contribute to student dropouts.

Government effort such as Guyana's "Because We Care" grant aims to target these barriers to education. It was first launched in 2014 as a direct grant to help offset out-of pocked costs for school supplies and uniforms to 205,000 public and private school students. It was later reinstated in 2021 at GYD $19,000 per child. In 2025, the program allocated GYD $11 billion to provide GYD $55,000 per student. This increased to GYD $85,000 per child in 2026.

In addition, the National School Feeding Programme in 2026 allocated GYD $7.0 Billion, aimed at providing meals that cut food costs for families. Furthermore, the provision of Textbooks and workbooks, allocating GYD $2.3 Billion in 2026, aimed to the need for families to buy books. This programmes provides cost-of-living relief through investments in the school system.

== Education aid ==
The main providers of education aid in Guyana include the World Bank, the Global Partnership for Education (GPE), and the Inter-American Development Bank (IDB). External funding plays a meaningful role in closing financing gaps, contributing an average of 8–10% of total domestic education spending.

World Bank data show that net official development assistance and official aid received were generally below US $30 million per year between 1960 and 1989. Aid flows rose sharply in the 1990s, reaching a peak of US $235.5 million in 1997, before stabilising between US $50 million and $160 million through the 2000s and 2010s. More recently, net aid dropped to US $53.2 million in 2020, increased to US $200.5 million in 2022 and was at US $139.8 million in 2023. Specific data on the amount of the allocation of aid in education specifically could not be identified.

== Debt servicing ==
Guyana's changing fiscal landscape has transformed the relationship between public debt servicing and educational investment. Historically, heavy external debt burdens severely constrained national spending, forcing the government to dedicate a vast share of its revenues to debt servicing at the expense of improving education.

While Guyana's economy has expanded rapidly since offshore oil production began in 2019, public debt has also increased from US $1.8 billion to over US $ 7.7 billion. At the same time, heavy siphoning of the Natural resource fund has totalled roughly US $4.6 billion of the US $7.8 billion generated in oil revenues since 2019. The guyanese government contends that this has been directed towards building durable long term assets. Lachlan Williams, in 2026 argued that long-term stability depends on whether these investments produce a resilient, diversified economy rather than leaving behind heavy debt once oil production declines.

Despite this rise in absolute debt, Guyana's debt-to-GDP ratio has fallen sharply. In 1991, the debt-to-GDP ratio amounted to 600%. This fell to 24.6% in 2022 as oil-driven economic growth has outpaced the growth in borrowing. The share of government revenue consumed by debt servicing is similar, dropping from 90 cents of every dollar in 1992 to just 7 cents in 2026.

== IMF and World Bank conditionalities ==
Guyana is the only country to have graduated from the Heavily Indebted Poor Countries (HIPC) initiative and reach a high-income status. Engagement with the IMF has subsequently changed to encompass annual Article IV consultations rather than loan conditions. The World Bank relationship has also shifted, with growing involvement from the International Finance Corporation (IFC) and Multilateral Investment Guarantee Agency (MIGA). Both institutions now focus on developing the private-sector within Guyana rather than the provision of soft loans.

Guyana's relationship with IFI's has moved through different periods depending on the social policy prescribed by different administrations. Between 1978 and 1981, the government sought and received financial stabilisation packages from the IMF. Guyana failed to meet the structural conditionalities attached to these funds in 1982, leading the IMF to declare the country ineligible for further credits in 1983.

In 1988, the IMF and world bank implemented the Economic Recovery Program (ERP). The ERP focused on market liberalisation, establishing competitive exchange rates, reducing fiscal deficits, removing consumer subsidies, and initiating the privatisation of the public sector. These structural adjustment policies (SAPs) was aimed at shaping Guyana into a free market to provide long-term, sustainable growth.

The economist Andrew Downes (1992) suggests that SAPs declined real wages, falling per-capita social spending and deterioration social services. As a result, education was affected directly through spending cuts and cost-recovery, and indirectly through reduced household income affecting families ability to afford schooling. This manifested in deteriorating school infrastructure, staffing and supply shortages, and a growing reliance on teachers who lacked proper training. This pattern persisted into the following decades: in 2008-2009, 36 percent of teachers in Guyana were without any formal teacher training, with the shortage particularly acute in the hinterland, where the ratio of untrained to trained teachers stood at 71:1, compared to a national average of 40:1.

== Illicit financial flows ==
Illicit financial flows (IFFs) affect education by draining tax revenues and domestic capital from national economies. This severely weakens public budgets, which can leader to the underfunding of public education, shortages of qualified teachers, and inadequate school infrastructure.

The Tax Justice Network estimates Guyana's annual tax losses from global tax abuse at approximately US$1.72 million, equivalent to 0.18% of tax revenue, or about US $2 per capita, below both the global average revenue loss of 2.8% and the regional average of 2.7%. Under its methodology, nearly all of this estimated loss is attributed to tax evasion by private individuals, with corporate tax abuse assessed at close to zero. The Tax Justice Network states that tax loss is equivalent to 0.81% of education spending.

This is a modelled estimate rather than an audited figure. The International Anti-Corruption Academy note that illicit and tax-avoidance-related financial flows are difficult to measure because they are often hidden, illegal, or opaque.

Separately, the Oil & Gas Governance Network (OGGN) estimate that Guyana lost at least US $397 million in taxes owed by ExxonMobil and its partners in 2021. They stated that this was a result of profit-shifting arrangements. In 2019, Guyana's State Assets Recovery Agency was investigating allegations of corrupt practices in the awarding of oil exploration blocks to ExxonMobil and Tullow Oil. According to a 2018 paper by the Natural Resource Governance Institute, Guyana's revenues from the petroleum sector could range between US$7 billion and US$27 billion over 30 years. The same paper estimated to peak between US$800 million and US$2.5 billion between 2025 and 2028. However, 2025 alone Guyana received US $2.47 billion. This scale of growth is expected to place significant pressure on the administrative capacity of a nation of under one million people. That is, the government government faces a challenge in upgrading its public institutions fast enough to manage and spend this wealth effectively.

== See also ==
- Economy of Guyana
- Education in Guyana
- Petroleum Industry in Guyana
