= Debre Genet Medhane Alem Church =

Ethiopian Orthodox church in Temple Hills, Maryland

- Debre Genet Medhane Alem Ethiopian Orthodox Tewahido Church
- Debre Genet Medhane Alem Church
- 38°49′49″N 76°56′4″W
- Location: 4401 Old Branch Avenue; Temple Hills, Maryland
- Country: United States
- Denomination: Ethiopian Orthodox
- Website: dgmedhanealem.org

History
- Founded: 1979

Administration
- Diocese: Metropolitan Washington Archdiocese

Debre Genet Medhane Alem Ethiopian Orthodox Tewahido Church is an Ethiopian Orthodox church in Temple Hills, Maryland.

== History ==
The church was founded in 1979 by Ethiopian exiles who fled during the Ethiopian Revolution.

The church hosted the wedding of Prince Joel Dawit Makonnen, great-grandson of Emperor Haile Selassie, and Ariana Joy Lalita Austin on September 9, 2017.
