= Berkeley Gaskin =

West Indian cricketer (1908–1979)

Personal information
- Full name: Berkeley Bertram McGarrell Gaskin
- Born: 21 March 1908; Georgetown, British Guiana
- Died: 2 May 1979 (aged 71); Georgetown, Guyana
- Batting: Right-handed
- Bowling: Right-arm medium

International information
- National side: West Indies
- Test debut (cap 55): 21 January 1948 v England
- Last Test: 11 February 1948 v England

Domestic team information
- Years: Team
- 1928–29 to 1953–54: British Guiana

Career statistics
| Competition | Tests | First-class |
|---|---|---|
| Matches | 2 | 41 |
| Runs scored | 17 | 782 |
| Batting average | 5.66 | 14.21 |
| 100s/50s | 0/0 | 0/2 |
| Top score | 10 | 64 |
| Balls bowled | 474 | 11,341 |
| Wickets | 2 | 139 |
| Bowling average | 79.00 | 31.66 |
| 5 wickets in innings | 0 | 6 |
| 10 wickets in match | 0 | 0 |
| Best bowling | 1/15 | 7/58 |
| Catches/stumpings | 1/0 | 19/0 |
- Source: Cricinfo, 18 February 2019

Berkeley Bertram McGarrell Gaskin (21 March 1908 – 2 May 1979) was a West Indian cricketer and administrator who played in two Tests in 1947–48. Gaskin played first-class cricket as a medium-pace bowler and lower-order batsman for British Guiana from 1929 to 1953, captaining the side from 1950–51 to 1952–53. After his playing career he served in various administrative roles for the West Indies cricket team including team manager and selector.

== Career ==
Gaskin was born in Georgetown on 21 March 1908. He made his first-class debut against Trinidad during the 1928/29 Inter-Colonial Tournament. Primarily a medium-pace opening bowler, he could swing the ball both ways and bowled off the wrong foot. Gaskin was not initially a regular for British Guiana and it was not until the mid-1940's that his performances were noted by selectors. He took bowling figures of 6/60 against Trinidad in 1945 and in the following match scored his career-best innings of 64.

West Indies resumed Test cricket after the Second World War with a home series against England in 1947–48. Gaskin, aged nearly 40, was one of seven West Indies Test debutants selected for the first Test. He took a solitary wicket of stand-in captain Ken Cranston in a drawn match. In the second Test, Gaskin dismissed captain Gubby Allen and affected the run out of Jack Robertson by fielding a ball directed to cover off his own bowling. Gaskin was dropped from the side for the third Test in Georgetown.

Gaskin continued to play for British Guiana until his retirement in October 1953. He took his best bowling figures of 7 for 58 against Jamaica in 1950–51.

Gaskin was team manager of the West Indies side on three overseas tours: to India and Pakistan in 1958–59, to England in 1963, and to Australia and New Zealand in 1968–69. On the first of these tours he sent Roy Gilchrist home for disciplinary reasons after the Indian leg of the tour. Gaskin served as a West Indies selector and was President of the Guyana Cricket Association at the time of his death. Outside of cricket, he worked as a senior official in the Guyanese civil service.

Gaskin died on 2 May 1979, at the age of 71. He had suffered a stroke four weeks prior to his death. He was predeceased by his wife Winifred Gaskin who had served as Guyana’s minister of education and high commissioner to the Commonwealth Caribbean.
