= Marian Academy =

Private school in Georgetown, Guyana

Coordinates: 6.822328°N 58.155411°W

Location
- Carifesta Avenue; Georgetown, Guyana; Demerara-Mahaica (Region 4); George town Guyana

Information
- School type: Private pre-school, primary and secondary school
- Motto: In the light of wisdom
- Religious affiliation: Catholicism
- Established: 14 September 1998 (27 years ago)
- School number: +592 226 9044
- Chairman: Mr Carlton Joao
- Principal: Sister Shelly Jhetoo, OSU
- Grades: Pre-K to 12
- Average class size: 30
- Hours in school day: 6-8
- Colours: Dark blue, yellow, white
- Website: marianacademy.edu.gy

Marian Academy is a private Catholic nursery, primary and secondary school, located in Georgetown, Guyana. It is situated on Carifesta Avenue in central Georgetown.

== History ==
The school was opened on 14 September 1998, with 227 enrolled students. By 2001, the school had doubled in size, recording a figure of 453 students.

Since 2008, the school has run an annual "blood drive", in which students are encouraged to become blood donors. The drive is organised in collaboration with Guyana Red Cross and the National Blood Transfusion Service (NBTS).

In 2015, the school signed a Memorandum of Understanding with Jinshan Middle School in Fuzhou, China making Marian Academy the first school in Guyana to have a sister school in China. In 2019, 20 students from Marian visited Jinshan.

== Environs ==
It is between a YMCA and the Guyana National Park.

== See also ==
- Education in Guyana
- List of schools in Guyana
- Roman Catholicism in Guyana
