= Georgetown International Academy =

Location
- RV9G+GXR, Georgetown, Guyana; Georgetown; Guyana; 6.818258°N 58.131122°W

Information
- Other name: GIA
- Former name: Georgetown American School
- Type: American private international school
- Established: 1971; 55 years ago
- Oversight: U.S. Department of State Office of Overseas Schools
- Grades: PreK-12
- Enrollment: 209 (2020-2021)
- Campus type: Suburban
- Accreditations: AdvancED; COGNIA
- School fees: US$6,200 to US$25,375
- Affiliations: Southern Association of Colleges and Schools
- Website: www.giagy.org

The Georgetown International Academy is an American private international, coeducational day school in Georgetown, Guyana. Established in 1971, the academy offers an educational program compatible with the United States system from nursery through grade 12.

The school year comprises two semesters extending approximately from the end of August to the end of January and from the end of January to the middle of June.

== Organization ==
The school is governed by a school board of seven members, elected by parents of the students for a two-year term. The school is incorporated in Guyana and operates within the laws of Guyana.

The curriculum is largely that offered by United States elementary, middle and high schools, with additions intended to assist pupils in understanding Guyana and Caribbean geography and history. Textbooks are current and are from major U.S. educational publishers. The school is fully accredited by AdvancED (Southern Association of Colleges and Schools (SACS)).

== Facilities ==
The school's previous campus is located at 9-10 Delhi Street, Prashad Nagar, Georgetown, and housed in three buildings, one of which is undergoing extensive renovation. The small campus includes classrooms a science lab, a computer lab, a school library, art and music rooms, physical education and an assembly/lunch area. There are also two play areas including an early-childhood play center.

As of 2023, the school has moved to a new campus near the Giftland mall.

== Community work ==
In 2016 Georgetown International Academy's Key Club donated G$11 million to Giving Hope Foundation through hosting the Childhood Cancer Awareness Walk.

== See also ==
- Education in Guyana
- List of schools in Guyana
