= Queenstown, Guyana =

Queenstown
- Village
- Location in Guyana
- Coordinates: 7.1936°N 58.4938°W
- Country: Guyana
- Region: Pomeroon-Supenaam
- Neighbourhood Council: Aberdeen/Zorg-en-Vlygt
- Founded: 25 September 1841

Population (2012)
  - Total: 474

Queenstown is a village in the Pomeroon-Supenaam Region of Guyana. It is located on the Atlantic Ocean coast. It is one of the first villages where the emancipated African slaves bought the lands. Queenstown is home to the oldest extant mosque of Guyana.

== History ==
Queenstown started as three plantations named Mocha, West Field and Dageraad. In 1780, Fula people from Senegambia, Africa, arrived on the plantations as slaves. The tribe set out to build a small masjid out of wattle and mud. The mosque was rebuilt three times, and is still in service for a congregation of about 50 people.

In 1838, the slaves were emancipated. The plantations at the time were owned by Mr Carberry who decided to parcel up the land, and sell the lots to the former slaves. On 25 September 1841, the village of Queenstown was officially founded and named after Queen Victoria.

In 1842, the coffee shop of the village was transformed into the St Bartholomew's Anglican Church. The church was completed in November 1843. The building is shaped like an upside-down ship, and has been declared a regional monument.

In 1885, Burns Memorial Presbyterian Church was founded in Queenstown as the first congregation of the Guyana Presbyterian Church.

== Overview ==
Queenstown has a primary school, health clinic, community centre and a post office. Secondary education is provided in Anna Regina.

Queenstown is one of the emancipation villages where the villagers dress up in African clothes and parade through the village accompanied by a band on Emancipation Day (1 August).

== See also ==
- Buxton
