= Rupert Roopnaraine =

West Indian cricketer, writer and politician (1943–2026)

Minister of Education
- In office 2015–2017
- President: David A. Granger
- Preceded by: Shaik K.Z. Baksh
- Succeeded by: Nicolette Henry

Personal details
- Born: 31 January 1943 Georgetown, British Guiana
- Died: 23 February 2026 (aged 83) Georgetown, Guyana
- Party: Working People's Alliance
- Occupation: Author, politician, cricket player

Rupert Roopnaraine
Cricket information
- Batting: Right-handed
- Bowling: Right-arm off-break

Domestic team information
- Years: Team
- 1964–66: Cambridge University

Career statistics
Competition	First-class
Matches	29
Runs scored	302
Batting average	7.94
100s/50s	0/1
Top score	50*
Balls bowled	5,974
Wickets	58
Bowling average	36.53
5 wickets in innings	2
10 wickets in match	0
Best bowling	8/88
Catches/stumpings	7/–
- Source: CricketArchive

Rupert Roopnaraine (31 January 1943 – 23 February 2026) was a Guyanese cricketer, writer and politician. Roopnaraine served as Minister of Education of Guyana between 2015 and 2017.

== Life and career ==
=== Early life ===
Roopnaraine was born in Kitty, Georgetown, British Guiana (now Guyana). He was educated at Queen's College, Georgetown, and at St John's College, Cambridge.

In cricket, Roopnaraine was a right-arm off-break bowler and lower-order right-handed batsman. He played first-class cricket for the Cambridge University team from 1964 to 1966, and was awarded a Blue for representing the university in the annual University Match against Oxford in 1965 and 1966. His best bowling figures were 8 for 88 against Essex in 1965.

=== Politics ===
In 2015, Roopnaraine was appointed Minister of Education of Guyana. In 2017, he was reassigned to Ministry of the Presidency, and Nicolette Henry replaced him as Minister of Education.

=== Author ===
Primacy of the Eye: The Art of Stanley Greaves was published in 2003. Roopnaraine also contributed a substantial "Introduction" to the Peepal Tree Press 2010 edition of Edgar Mittelholzer's Shadows Move Among Them.

Roopnaraine's collection of essays, The Sky's Wild Noise, won the non-fiction category of the 2013 OCM Bocas Prize for Caribbean Literature. The judges commented that "in the corpus of non-fiction prose in the Caribbean intellectual tradition, only José Martí and George Lamming rival the range of Roopnaraine's capacities of response, depth of analysis and subtle and mordant style."

=== Death ===
Roopnaraine died at the Georgetown Public Hospital on 23 February 2026, at the age of 83.

== Selected works ==
- The Web of October: Rereading Martin Carter (Peepal Tree Press, 1986)
- Suite for Supriya (love poems; Peepal Tree Press, 1993)
- Primacy of the Eye: The Art of Stanley Greaves (Peepal Tree Press, 2003)
- The Sky's Wild Noise: Selected Essays (Peepal Tree Press, 2012)
