= Carnegie School of Home Economics =

Location
- 211 Durban and High Street; Georgetown; Guyana

Information
- Former name: Carnegie Trade School
- School type: Public, Trade school
- Established: 1933; 92 years ago
- Educational authority: Ministry of Education, Guyana
- Principal: Sharmaine Marshall
- Website: carnegieguyana.com
- Last updated: 2021-03-21

The Carnegie School of Home Economics (CSHE) is a service-sector trade school in Guyana.

CSHE trains 1,200 persons annually, including private sector training. The school accommodates 250 part and full-time students, graduating about 100 each year.

== History ==
CSHE was established in 1933 as the Carnegie Trade School on a grant from the Carnegie Trust. The school was founded to encourage employment for women. In 1937, school operations were handed over to the government and until 1958 the school ran a commercial enterprise to produce uniforms for government sector employees as well as catering operations. In 1957 the name was changed to Carnegie School of Home Economics in order to drop the moniker as a trade school exclusively for women, as men were also admitted to the school. In the 1960s, CSHE also offered teacher training, but now is handled by the Cyril Potter College of Education. In 1978, a craft institution was developed to improve the economic viability of craft production.

In the 1970s, catering services were expanded, and the Hibiscus Restaurant was opened to provide a public-facing culinary education. In 2016, the school was connected to high speed internet.

== Programs ==
=== Catering and Hospitality ===
Catering and hospitality is the school's flagship program.

CSHE partnered with Newrest, an international catering company, to provide expertise for Guyana's need for food services related to the burgeoning oil sector. Off-shore catering techniques have also been addressed through partnerships in the oil industry.

Roraima Duke Lodge partnered with CSHE for providing final evaluation of students in the culinary program.

=== Certificate programs ===
The school offers many certificate and short term courses. In 2012, the school started a certificate course in commercial food preparation and general cosmetology. In 2019, the school started a program focused on elder care. They have also offered courses in bartending.

Front desk operations, housekeeping, resort management, hospitality management and health and social care are the most sought-after fields for graduates.

== Outreach ==
CSHE has represented Guyana's food and manufacturing industries at CARIFESTA and Guyexpo.

Rice Essequiba was a dish created by the school that has become part of the local cuisine.

== Publication ==
- What’s Cooking in Guyana. Carnegie School of Home Economics, Macmillan Caribbean, 2004. (ISBN 9781405013130)

== See also ==
- List of universities and colleges in Guyana
- Education in Guyana
