= John Meredith Ford =

Guyanese politician

The Right Worshipful John Meredith Ford
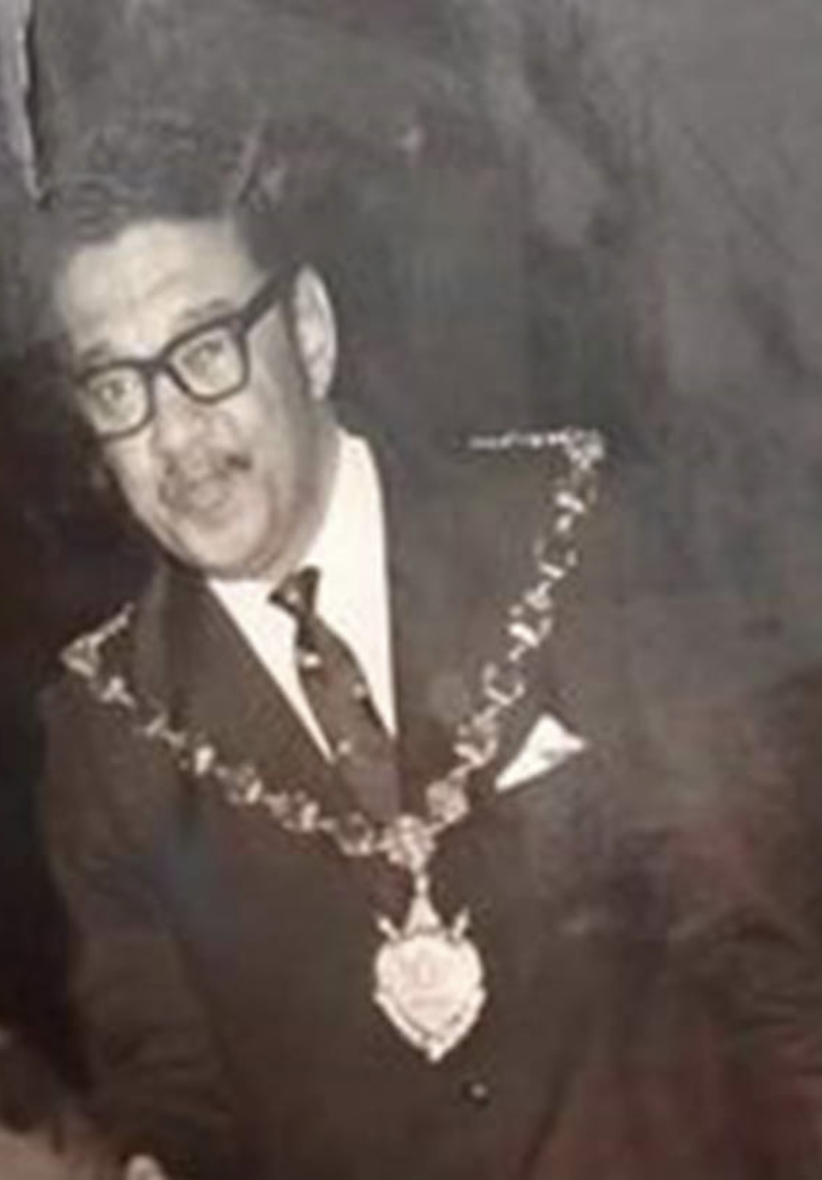

Lord Mayor of Georgetown
- In office 1970–1972

Personal details
- Born: 1923 Georgetown, British Guiana, British Empire
- Died: 18 November 1995 (aged 71–72) Silver Spring, Maryland, United States
- Spouse: Sarojini Janki
- Children: 4 (including Joy Ford Austin)
- Parent(s): Ernest Lochmohr Ford; Florence Jean Goring
- Relatives: Princess Ariana Austin Makonnen (granddaughter)
- Occupation: Politician, businessman

John Meredith Ford (1923 – 18 November 1995) was a Guyanese businessman and politician who served as the Lord Mayor of Georgetown, Guyana, from 1970 to 1972. During his time in office, Guyana transitioned from a monarchy under the rule of Elizabeth II to the Co‑operative Republic of Guyana, an independent member of the Commonwealth of Nations. He hosted independence celebrations in the nation's capital and renamed streets to celebrate the country's freedom from British rule. After immigrating to the United States in 1982, Ford worked as a furniture salesman and real estate investor in the Washington, D.C. area.

== Career ==
Ford was a businessman, civic leader, and political figure who served as the head of Governmental Ministries. In the 1950s and 1960s, he worked as an executive at Weiting and Richter, a cold storage and ice depot.

He worked as a business manager and executive in finance, real estate, sawmilling, sales, and furniture manufacturing in Guyana. In his later life, he worked as a furniture salesman at Hub Furniture Stores in Maryland and owned and managed rental properties in Washington, D.C. and suburban Maryland.

=== Politics ===
Ford served on the Georgetown city council and was director of government programs in business development.

From 1970 to 1972, he served as the Lord Mayor of Georgetown. While serving as Lord Mayor, he represented Georgetown in several twin city exchanges in foreign capitals. During his tenure as Lord Mayor, Guyana joined the British Commonwealth. On 21 February 1970, Ford renamed High Street in Georgetown, pulling a string during the ceremony to reveal the independence flag of Guyana and the street's new name, Avenue of the Republic. The avenue leads from Church Street up to the Parliament Building. Ford gave a speech to the crowd, saying that renaming the streets is a necessary exercise in "all newly independent countries" and that his action was an attempt to record in history the "important occasions such as independence" and the "birth of the republic." He ended his speech by saying: "We have Independence Park, Independence Boulevard, and now the Avenue of the Republic." During the independence celebrations, he hosted Hamilton Holder, the mayor of the Port of Spain, and Guyana-born Trinidad Councillor Walter Bentley.

== Personal life ==
Ford was born in British Guiana to Ernest Lochmohr Ford and Florence Jean Goring.

He married Sarojini Janki, an Indo-Guyanese woman who worked for the Ministry of Education and was the daughter of the first Presbyterian elder of Demerara. They had four children: Joy, John Deep, Holly, and Sharada. Ford is the grandfather of Princess Ariana Austin Makonnen.

Ford and his family emigrated to the United States in 1982 and settled in the Washington, D.C. metropolitan area.

In 1995, Ford suffered from a heart attack while driving his car. He was brought to Prince George's Hospital Center in Silver Spring, Maryland, where he died on 18 November 1995.
