= North West Secondary School =

School in Mabaruma, Guyana

North West Secondary School is a secondary school in Mabaruma, capital town of the Barima-Waini region in northern Guyana. The school was established in 1965, being the only secondary school in the region until the establishment of Santa Rosa school in 1992. The school is run by a local school board, having been led by a headmaster until 2005. Classes originally ran from forms one to five, though changed to transitional classes in 2015 to accommodate a rising population of school-age children in Mabaruma and its surrounding areas.

== Information ==
The school motto is "Excellence: Together We Build." The school song is "Bless This school, Oh Lord We Pray."

=== Location ===
The school is located at the Broomes S-turn, near Philbert Pierre Avenue.

=== Students ===
The school teaches over 700 students. Prospective students seeking admission are required to have at least 350 marks at their National Grade Nine Examinations (NGNE). In 2005, the school announced a 75% pass-rate of its Caribbean Examinations Council (CXC) examinations.

In 2018, there were 84 students in the graduating class. There was a marked improvement from 2017, Grades One -Three in English Language went up from 36.3 to 65 percent pass rate, and improvement in mathematics from 13.8 to 31 percent pass rate.

In order to improve education in the region, a three-day entrepreneurial training course was sponsored by School of the Nations (Guyana).

== Accomplishment ==
In 2017, the school represented Guyana at the 10th Biennial Caribbean Secondary Schools Drama Festival in Antigua and Barbuda after being selected for their work in the National Drama Festival in 2016.
