= Center for the Study of Higher Education =

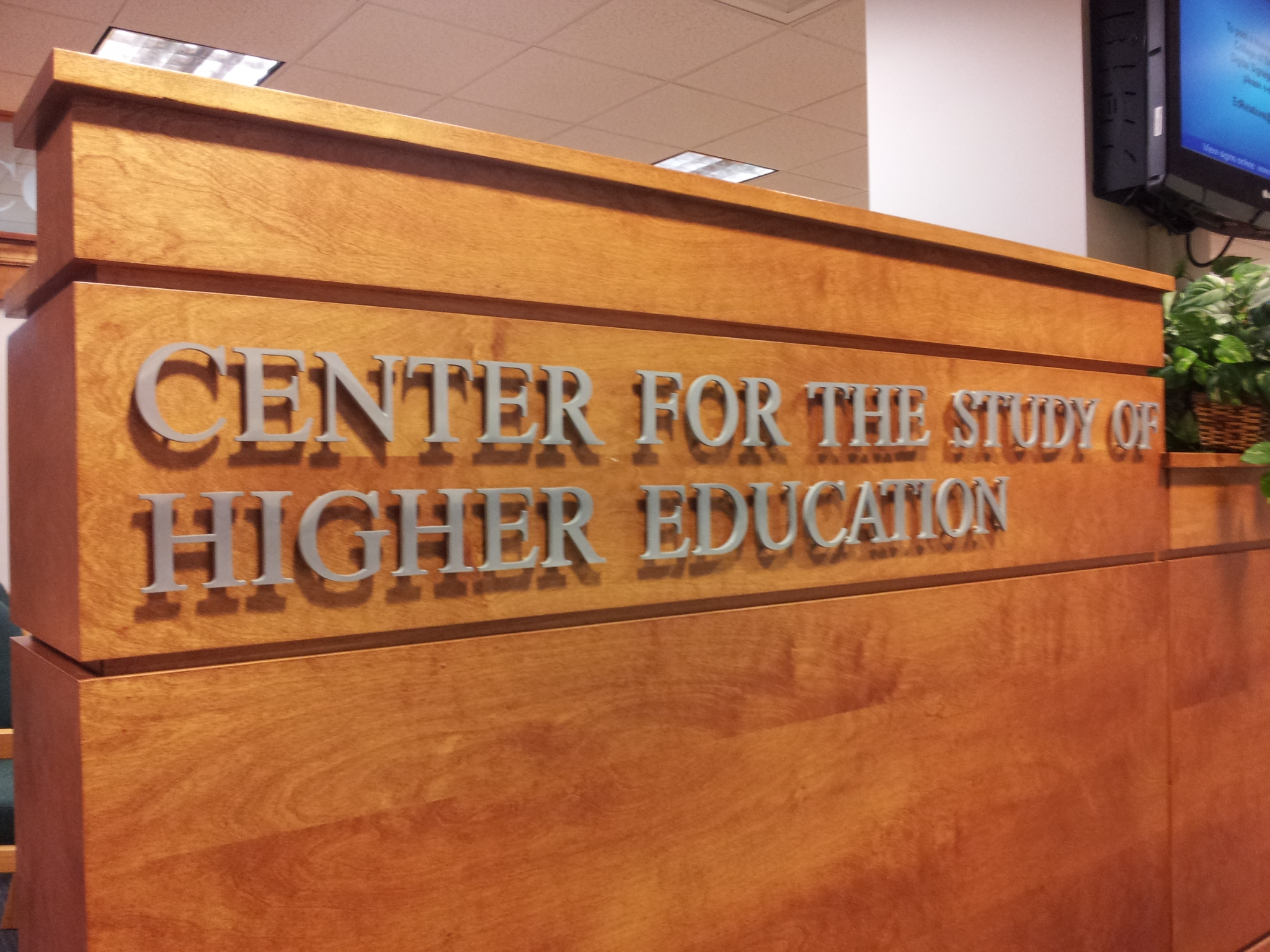
Center for the Study of Higher Education.

The Center for the Study of Higher Education (CSHE) is a research institute within Pennsylvania State University. Founded in 1969, it is "one of the first research organizations established specifically to examine postsecondary education policy issues." The center conducts research on topics of national and international interest in higher education as well as in areas of interest to Penn State. The center is staffed by faculty and graduate research assistants from within Penn State's master's and doctoral higher education programs.
