= Digital technology =

Digital technology may refer to:

- Digital electronics
- Information technology
