= The Business School Guyana =

Coordinates: 6.80762°N 58.16103°W

The Business School (TBS) is a career-oriented for-profit university and high school located in Georgetown, Guyana. It is a was founded in 1975 by Erma Bovell. The Business School – High School was established in September 1997 (28 years ago). There is also a branch in Berbice.

== Programs ==
Academic programs include Business, Accounting, Science, Project Management, Marketing, Information Technology and Specialized Training.

The college is accredited by a number of educational bodies including the Chartered Institute of Marketing (CIM), Association of Chartered Certified Accountants (ACCA), Association of Business Executives (ABE), and Caribbean Examinations Council (CXC). TBS is a participating college under the American Management Association (AMA) Self Study University Certificate Program.
