= Brenda DoHarris =

Brenda Chester DoHarris (born 9 June 1946) is a writer and academic from Guyana.

== Career ==
Doharris was born in Georgetown, British Guiana and attended Bishops' High School on scholarship. Her education and experience growing up in rural Kitty were a major influence on her writing. She studied at Columbia University and Howard University, receiving a B.A. in 1970 and M.S. in 1721, both in English.

== Works ==
DoHarris published her novel, The Coloured Girl in the Ring: A Guyanese Woman Remembers, in 1997. According to a review in the College Language Association Journal, "The story is remarkable for its picture of a Guyanese village, but it requires a sequel to truly explore the life of this nameless narrator, who remains more an onlooker and reporter than the central persona of this piece." A review from Kaieteur News describes it as "...a bitter-sweet narrative, one that is poignant and deeply moving, and made even more so by a feminist perspective that rightly celebrates the sustaining role of women in colonised societies."

Calabash Parkway (2005) is about Guyanese immigrant women in Brooklyn, New York, women who struggle against the odds to gain legal residence.

Doharris was a contributor for Walter A. Rodney: A Promise of Revolution by Clairmont Chung. 2012. (ISBN 9781583673287)

== Awards ==
Calabash Parkway won the Guyana Prize for Literature.
