= Santa Rosa Secondary School =

School in Santa Rosa, Barima-Waini, Guyana

Coordinates: 7°39′0″N 58°57′0″W

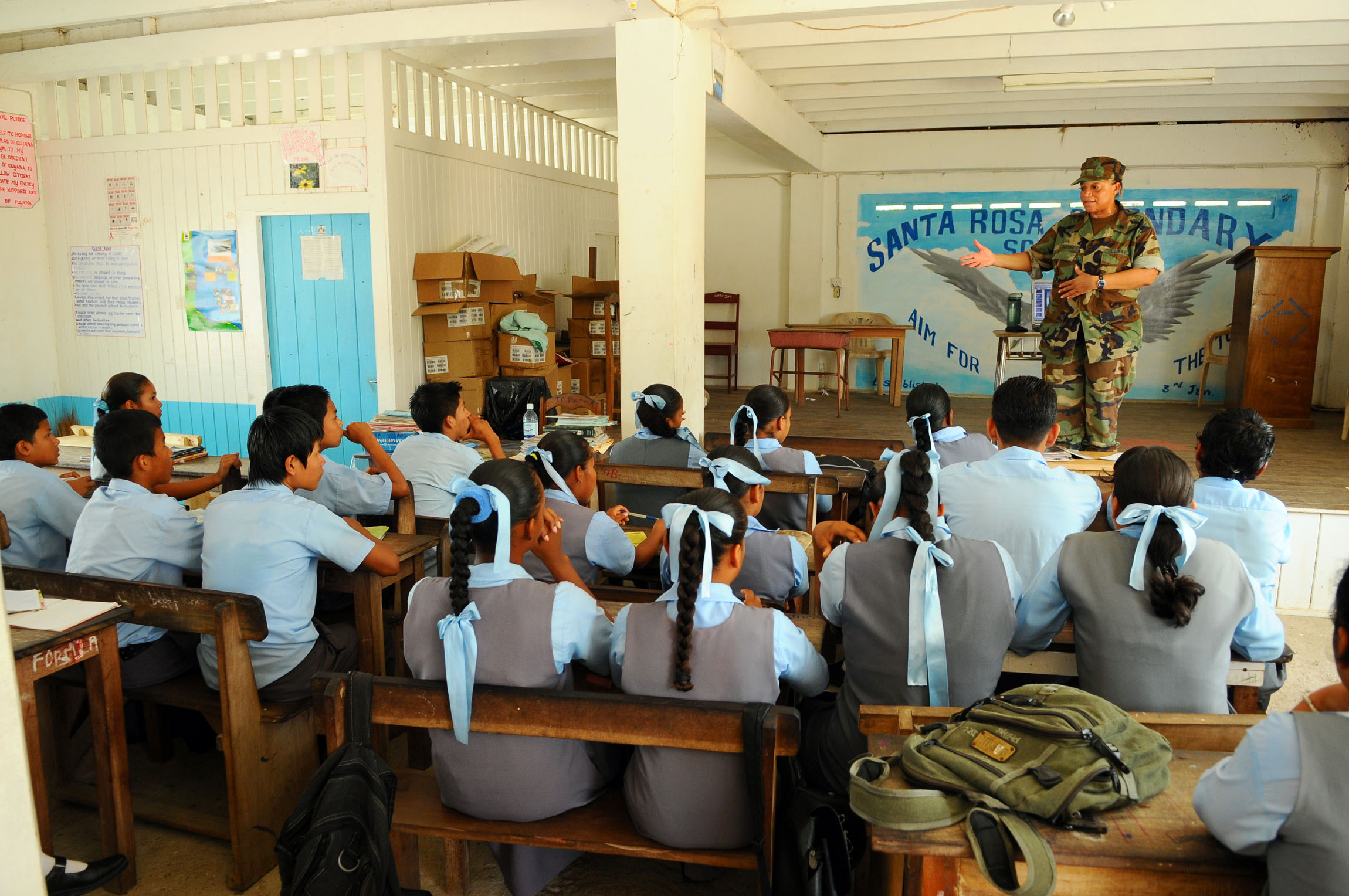

Santa Rosa Secondary School is a secondary school in Santa Rosa, in the Barima-Waini region of northern Guyana. The school was established in 1991, making it the second secondary school in the area after the establishment of North West Secondary School in 1965. Prospective students undergo competitive examination and may take their Caribbean Examinations Council (CXC) examinations upon graduation. As of 2009, the school taught over 650 students, up from 264 in 2005. Of these 264, 72 of whom were housed in a dormitory sponsored by the Inter-American Development Bank. A third wing was built in 2009, adding nine new classrooms to the school. Jonny La'go Payne assumed the role of headmaster in 2005.
