= Burns Memorial Presbyterian Church =

Presbyterian church in Georgetown, Guyana

- Location: Irving Street, Georgetown
- Country: Guyana
- Denomination: Guyana Presbyterian Church

History
- Founded: 1885

Burns Memorial Presbyterian Church is a Presbyterian church in Georgetown, Guyana. It was founded in 1885 as the first congregation of the Canadian Presbyterian Church in British Guyana.

== History ==
Burns Memorial Presbyterian Church was founded in Georgetown in 1885 as the first congregation of the Canadian Presbyterian Church in British Guyana (Guyana Presbyterian Church), a branch of the Presbyterian Church in Canada. The church ministered to the local Indo-Guyanese community. It is located in Georgetown's Queenstown village, at the corner of Irving Street and Anira Street.

Rev. Dale Bisnauth, later the Minister Of Labour, Human Services, and Social Security, served as the pastor of the congregation. His funeral took place there in 2013.

In 2013, Rev. Gaitri Singh-Henry became pastor of the church.

In April 2015, the Guyana Presbyterian Church held the People of Faith, United for Peace event at the church, hosting members of the Interreligious Organisation of Guyana. From 16 October to 17 October 2015, the Synod of the Guyana Presbyterian Church met at Burns Memorial to adopt a new sexual misconduct policy.

During the COVID-19 pandemic in Guyana, the Ministry of Health made a vaccine distribution site at the church.
