= Arthur Chung Conference Centre =

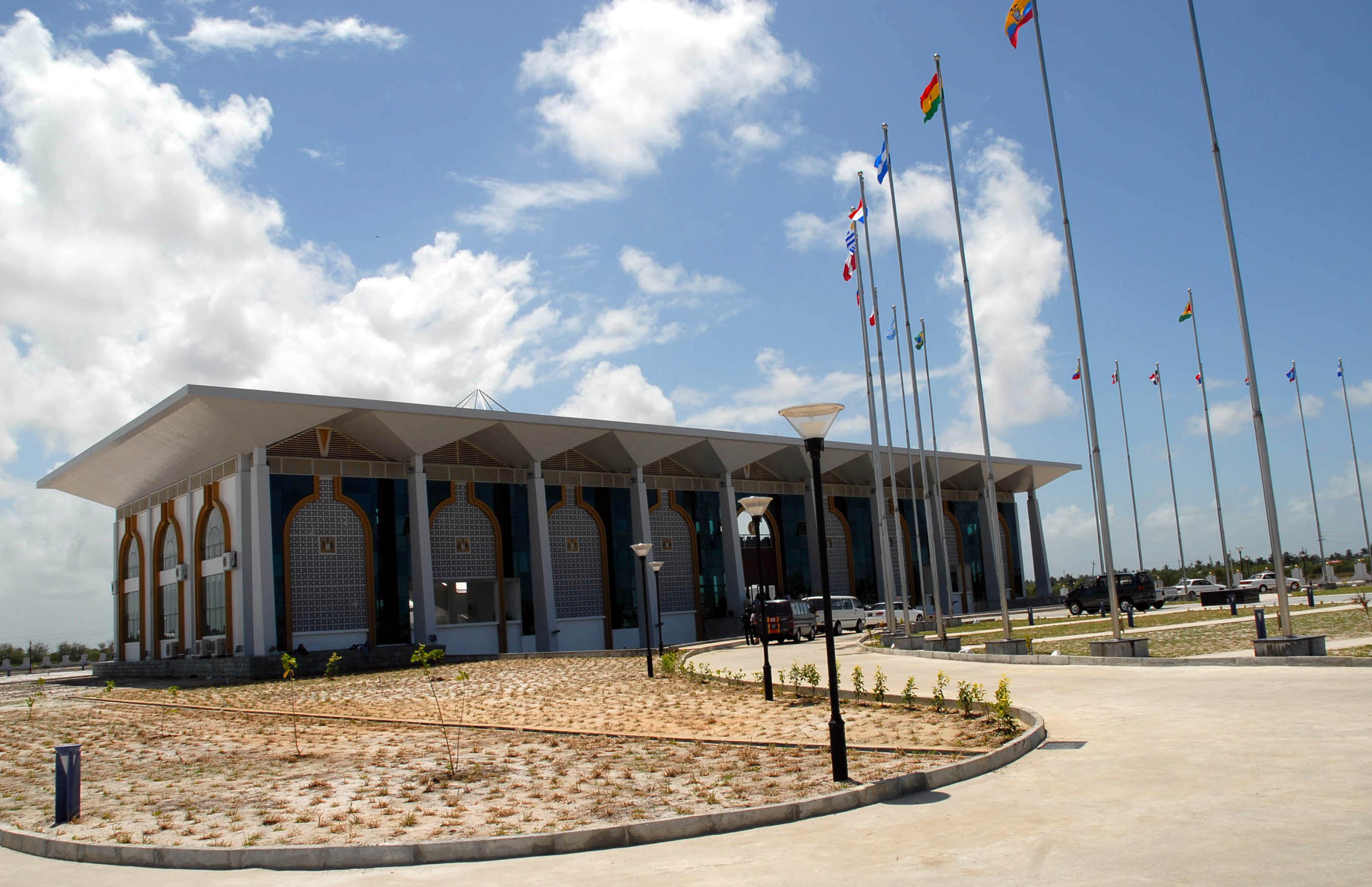

- Location within Guyana

General information
- Location: Georgetown, Guyana
- Coordinates: 6.82082°N 58.11890°W
- Completed: 2006
- Renovated: 8 June 2018
- Cost: US$ 7.1 million (renovation)

The Arthur Chung Conference Centre is a convention and exhibition centre in Georgetown, Guyana. It is located next to the Secretariat of the Caribbean Community.

== Overview ==
The convention centre was constructed in 2006, and was initially named Guyana International Conference Centre. The convention centre is a gift from the People's Republic of China, and became the preferred location for venues, and was often used by CARICOM for conferences.

In 2015, the centre was renamed to Arthur Chung Conference Centre in honour of Arthur Chung, the first president of Guyana who was of Chinese (Hakka Han) ethnicity.

The Chinese Government had offered a 10-year agreement for repairs. In 2016, the centre closed for repairs and reconstruction. It reopened on 8 June 2018 with a 500-seat main hall, an eastern conference room of 220 people and a western conference room of 120. The main halls has been fitted with sliding walls to allow the creation of up to five smaller rooms. The renovation was carried out by the China Railway Group Limited.

During the COVID-19 pandemic of 2020–21, the centre was temporarily used by the National Assembly in order to meet physical distance requirements.
