= St. Rose's High School (Guyana) =

Senior secondary school in Georgetown, Guyana

Coordinates: 6.8122°N 58.1594°W

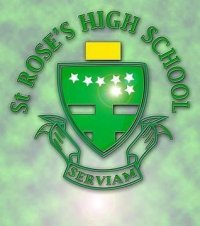
- 254 Church Street; Demerara Mahaica, Guyana. Georgetown, Guyana; Guyana

Information
- School type: Senior Secondary
- Motto: Serviam ('I will Serve')
- Patron saint: St. Rose of Lima
- Established: 1847; 179 years ago
- Founder: Ursulines
- Status: Open
- Authority: Ministry of Education
- School number: 090046
- Acting headteacher: Rayon Tobin
- Faculty: 50+
- Grades: 7-13
- Gender: co-ed
- Age range: 11-18
- Language: English
- Schedule: 8:45 a.m. - 3:00 p.m.
- Campus type: Urban
- Houses: Brescia, Cologne, Lima, Loretto, Merici
- Colors: White and Green
- Song: Ursuline Hymn
- Nickname: Rose's
- USNWR ranking: 4th
- National ranking: 4th
- Alumni name: St. Rose's Alumni Association Guyana Inc. - https://strosesalumni.org/ St. Rose's Alumni Association USA Inc. - https://strosesalumni.org/ St. Rose's Alumni Association Toronto Inc. - https://www.strosesalumnitoronto.com/

St. Rose's High School is a Grade-A Senior (National) Secondary School on Church Street in Georgetown, Guyana, serving students in grades 7–12. To be accepted into the school, the student must receive a certain grade in their Secondary Schools Entrance Examination (SSEE).

== History ==
The Ursuline Order of Nuns who run the academy has been involved in education in Guyana as early as 1847. St. Rose's High was named for Saint Rose of Lima. St. Rose's is now the fourth (4th) highest school in the country. In 1976 the government took over operations of all educational institutions.

The section of the school built in 1912 was set for demolition in 2018. Some of the schools buildings are considered a national heritage site by the National Trust of Guyana.

== Facilities ==
The school has three science laboratories. There is a library, a Home Economics Department, an AutoCAD laboratory, an Industrial Arts Department, and a computer laboratory. The campus also has a document centre, a sick bay, and a basketball court which is used for cricket, volleyball, football, etc.

== Student organizations and traditions ==
=== Houses and their colours ===
St. Rose's students are sorted into five houses; Their names, colours and mottos are:

- Brescia: Red (He conquers who overcomes himself)
- Cologne: Yellow (Nothing ventured, nothing gained)
- Lima: Pink (Excelsior)
- Loreto: Blue (Unity is strength)
- Merici: Green (Where there’s a will, there’s a way)

School athletics includes basketball, football, and extra curriculars such as participating in the biennial STEAM Fair, and a speech team.

== Alumni ==
The St. Rose's High School Alumni Association has chapters located in Guyana, the US and Canada.

=== Notable alumni ===
- Joy Ford Austin (graduated 1968), non-profit executive and philanthropist.
- Catherine Hughes (graduated 1979), member of parliament (Guyana)
- Cherry-Ann Fraser (graduated 2016), Guyanese cricketer
- Anyin Choo (graduated 1992), Guyana’s Ambassador to China
- Hew Locke, Guyanese-British sculptor and contemporary visual artist
- Gail Teixeira, Minister of Health, Minister of Home Affairs, Minister of Culture Youth and Sport, and now as Minister of Parliamentary Affairs and Governance.
