= Anna Regina Secondary School =

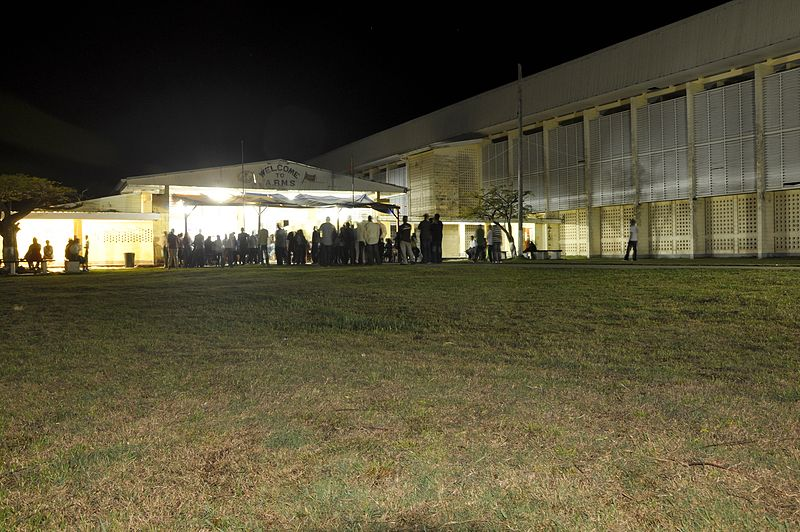
- Anna Regina Secondary School at night

Location
- Cotton Field, Anna Regina, Pomeroon-Supenaam, Essequibo Coast; Guyana

Information
- Other names: ARSS; Multi
- Former names: Anna Regina Government School; Anna Regina Multilateral School
- Type: Secondary school
- Motto: Character and Efficiency
- Established: May 8, 1973; 51 years ago
- Enrollment: 900

Anna Regina Secondary School, (abbreviated as ARSS) is a secondary school located in Anna Regina, Pomeroon-Supenaam, Essequibo Coast, Guyana.

Established on 8 May 1973 as the Anna Regina Government School, the school was formerly known as Anna Regina Multilateral School and informally known as Multi. It started with less than 200 students, and it currently has over 900 students and over 40 teachers and auxiliary staff.

== Overview ==
It is considered as one of the best schools in Guyana. In 2013, Anna Regina Secondary School was the top school of the Caribbean, with a student achieving (19 grade ones). In 2018 a student of Anna Regina secured 21 passes, and in 2019 another obtained 19 grade ones at the Caribbean Secondary Education Certificate examinations.

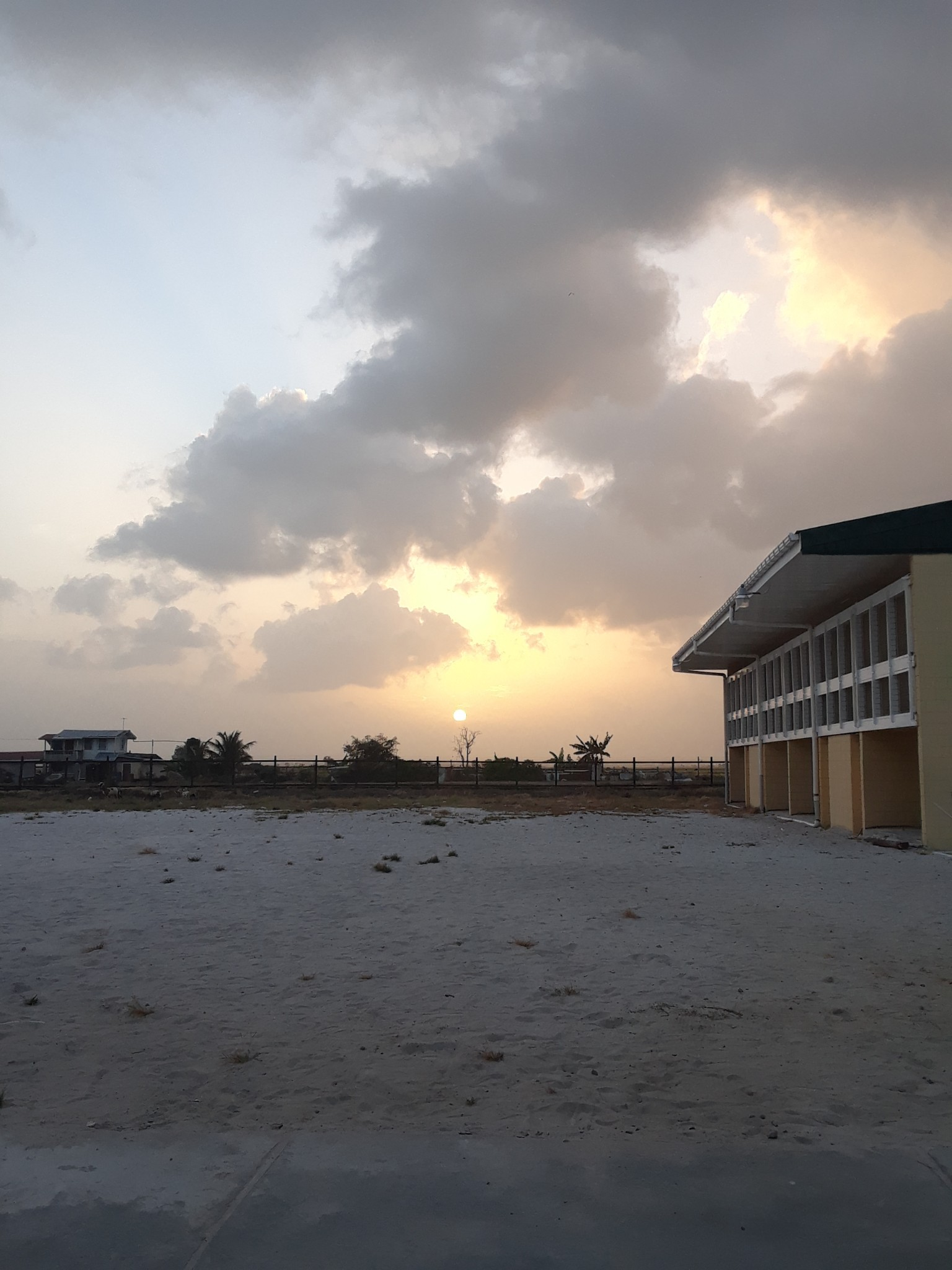
Sunset from the volleyball court

The dormitory was completed in 2005. It was established to facilitate students (who wish to study at the school) from Region 1, 2, 7, 8 & 9. It can accommodate up to 200 students (male and female). Students are provided with free meals i.e. breakfast, lunch and dinner and a few snacks at night. It is supervised by the dormitory parents.
