= Guyana Presbyterian Church =

The Guyana Presbyterian Church was a fruit of the Presbyterian Church in Canada. In 1880 Rev. John Morton a Canadian missionary from Trinidad and Tobago visited British Guyana and recommended to start mission outpost there. The Canadian Presbyterian Church sent Rev. John Gibson to work in Demerara County. The first congregation was the Burns Memorial Presbyterian Church in 1885 to serve the Indian population in Georgetown, Guyana. After his death Rev J. B. Cropper took over the mission in 1895, he spoke fluent Hindi and worked among the Indians in the plantations. Until 1945 the church worked among Indians. Schools and churches were established. A presbytery was formed in 1945 as the Canadian Presbyterian Church in British Guyana. In 1961 the name changed to Guyana Presbyterian Church. It adheres to the Apostles Creed, Nicene Creed and the Westminster Confession of Faith. It had 2,500 members in 44 congregations and 44 house fellowships.

It is a member of the World Communion of Reformed Churches.
