= Ministry of Education (Guyana) =

Guyana Ministry of Education

Co-operative Republic of Guyana Ministry of Education

Agency overview
- Headquarters: 68 Brickdam, Georgetown
- Agency executive: Sonia Parag, Minister of Education
- Website: education.gov.gy

The Ministry of Education (MOE) is a ministry of the government of Guyana, and is responsible for the education in Guyana. The current minister as of 2025 is Sonia Parag.

The Ministry of Education was a part of the Education Act of 1877, followed by the appointment of chief education officer and deputy chief education officer in 1949. In 1980, the Ministry of Higher Education was established to oversee universities and technical schools. In 1991 the Ministry of Education was restructured to organize the division between education and administrative roles.

== List of ministers ==
The following is a list of ministers of Guyana.

- William Bain Gray (1928–1947) (as Director of Education in British Guiana)
- Forbes Burnham (May 1953–1957)
- Brindley Horatio Benn (1957–1961) (as Minister of Community Development and Education)
- No minister during 1961–1964
- Winifred Gaskin (1964–1973) (as Minister of Education, Youth, Race Relations & Community Development)
- C.L. Baird (1973–1976)
- Vincent Teekah as Minister of Education, Social Development and Culture (1976-1979)
- Jeffrey Ronald Thomas (1980–1985)
- Ranji Chandisingh (1980–1985) (as Higher Education Minister)
- Viola Burnham (1985–1992) (as Vice-President, Education and Social Development, and Deputy Prime Minister)
- Ramnauth D.A. Bisnauth (1992–1997) (as Minister of Education and Cultural Development)
- Ramnauth D.A. Bisnauth (1997–2001)
- Henry Benfield Jeffrey (2001–2006)
- Shaik K.Z. Baksh (2006–2015)
- Rupert Roopnaraine (2015–2017)
- Nicolette Henry (2017–2020)
- Priya Manickchand (2020–)

== See also ==
- Guyana Learning Channel
