= Guyana School of Agriculture =

- Motto: Education is the Best Investment
- Former name: Central Agriculture Station
- Abbreviation: GSA
- Type: Agricultural college
- Established: September 9, 1963
- Founder: Cheddi Jagan
- Affiliations: Ministry of Agriculture
- Location: Agriculture Road, Demerara, Guyana; 6.786°N 58.059°W
- Language: Guyanese English
- Colours: Green & yellow
- Website: gsa.edu.gy

The Guyana School of Agriculture (GSA) is a post-secondary college of agricultural education in Guyana, established in 1963 by Dr. Cheddi Jagan. It became a state corporation in 1964 (62 years ago). It offers two-year diploma and certificate courses. There are two campuses: The first is at Mon Repos, Demerara, while the other is in Cotton Field Essequibo Coast.

GSA graduated the first batch of 15 students in 1966.

Programs include:

- Certificate in Forestry (since 1994)
- Animal Health and Veterinary Public Health (since 2007)
- Certificate in Fisheries Studies (since 2008)
- Certificate in Agro-Processing (since 2013)

The school has graduated 3,500 students in different fields of agriculture and forestry to address the development of skills and capacities of the actors involved in innovation, including farmers and their organizations, agricultural research, education and training institutions, extension and advisory services institutions, and the researchers and professionals working in the agricultural sector of Guyana and the Caribbean. Graduates have come from the Bahamas, Barbados, St Vincent, Dominica, St Vincent, St. Kitts, St. Lucia, Trinidad and Tobago, Jamaica, Nigeria, Botswana, Zimbabwe and Angola.

In 1970, GSA’S farming activities started with market gardening on a fifteen-acre plot and a livestock farm. By 1980, the school grew to include 47 acres for rice production, a 50-acre orchard at Kurukururu, and a small carambola orchard at Mon Repos. A food processing unit was also developed to serve both for teaching and as a semi commercial agency. The school regularly participates in fairs to showcase innovation and processed products. The school has a GSA brand in which they sell porridge mix, pepper sauce, green seasoning, chicken/ham and cheese to the local market, and proceeds benefit the school.

In 2020, Berbice was considered a new location for expanding agricultural education by incorporating with existing University of Guyana facilities.

== See also ==
- List of agricultural universities and colleges
