= Humanities DC =

HumanitiesDC, formerly known as the Humanities Council of Washington, DC, is an American non-profit affiliate of the National Endowment for the Humanities based in Washington, D.C. Humanities DC was founded in 1980 to fund and produce public humanities programming in the District of Columbia. It is one of 56 state humanities councils founded in the wake of the National Foundation on the Arts and Humanities Act of 1965.

The HumanitiesDC office is located in the historic Uline Arena, 1140 3rd Street NE, 2nd Floor, Washington, DC 20002. Rebecca Lemos-Otero was hired as the new Executive Director in September 2021.

== History ==
Founded in 1980 as the D.C. Community Humanities Council, Humanities DC funded several high-profile documentary films including The Stone Carvers in 1984, Fishing in the City in 1986, and Fine Food, Fine Pastries, Open 6 to 9 in 1989. During the 1990s, Humanities DC began producing its own public programming, to complement the public-humanities work of its grantees.

In 2005, in partnership with the DC Office of Historic Preservation, Humanities DC launched the DC Community Heritage Project, a combination of grants and programs aimed at empowering DC residents to research, disseminate, and preserve their own community histories.

In 2010, Humanities DC created the DC Digital Museum, an online repository of projects funded through its grant programs. The DC Digital Museum's collection of interpreted and primary source materials are available for download, streaming, or to borrow depending on copyright limitations.

== Current activities ==
Humanities DC continues to offer a combination of grants and public programs.

=== Grants ===
- DC Docs Partnership Grant
- Humanities Festival Partnership Grant
- Soul of the City Grant -
- DC Community Heritage Project Grant -
- Humanities Vision Grant

=== Programs ===
- Soul of the City - An award-winning youth program that uses the humanities disciplines to encourage leadership.
- Humanitini - A monthly program that brings an engaging panel of humanists into a DC bar or restaurant during happy hour.
- House History Days - These workshops are conducted twice a year in either the Washingtoniana Division at the DC Public Library or the Historical Society of Washington, DC. Participants learn how to use archival resources to research the history of their historic properties.
- DC Community Heritage Project Showcase - Recent DCCHP grantees display their projects at a public event.

=== DC Digital Museum ===
The DC Digital Museum is an archive of interpreted and primary source materials related to life in Washington, DC. The collection is built around the funded projects Humanities DC has collected since its founding. In 2014, Humanities DC launched Your DC Digital Museum, a series of public digitization events aimed at teaching residents about personal digital preservation and encouraging new submissions to the digital collection.

== See also ==
List of state humanities councils
