= Bishops' High School, Guyana =

The Bishops' High School
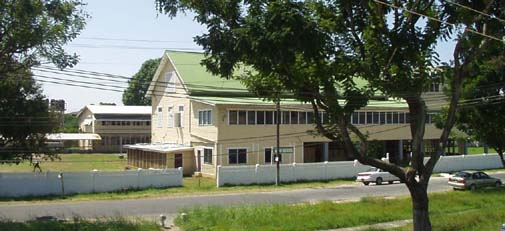

Location
- 84 Carmichael Street; Region 4 Georgetown; Guyana; 6.81428°N 58.16373°W

Information
- School type: Government
- Motto: Labor omnia vincit (Hard work conquers all)
- Established: 1870
- Status: Open
- Authority: Ministry of Education
- School number: 090007
- Principal: Ms. Shandrina Welcome-Lee
- Faculty: 32
- Grades: Forms 1 - Upper 6th
- Gender: co-ed
- Age range: 11 - 18
- Classes: 17
- Average class size: 35
- Language: English
- Campus type: Urban
- Colours: Red, Green & White
- Song: Look down on us oh father
- Nickname: B.H.S., Bishops
- USNWR ranking: 2
- National ranking: 2

The Bishops' High School is a high school in Georgetown, Guyana.

== History ==
It was established in 1870 by the Anglican Church as a girls' school. It later merged with Mrs. Vyfhuis' school, also founded in 1870, and then with the DeSaffon school. Vyfhuis was offered headship of the combined schools in 1875. The school's first home was at Brickdam and Manget Place, and then at "Minto House" on Waterloo Street. It later moved to "Lamaha House" at Carmichael and Lamaha Streets, the property of Bishop E. A. Parry.

In 1907, Bishop E. A. Parry moved the school to "Woodside House" (now known as "Transport House") on Main Street, and it became known as "Woodside House School". In 1921 the school moved to its present location at Carmichael and Murray (now known as Quamina) streets. In 1922 Bishop E.A. Parry retired and the school then became known as "The Bishops' High School". Parry died in 1936 and the "Oswald Parry Hall" was opened at the school.

In January 1936, the school was handed over to the government of British Guiana. The new building was opened on January 5, 1946. The school celebrated its centennial in 1970 and became a co-educational institution in 1975.

The school's mottos are "Labor Omnia Vincit" and "What so ever thy hand findeth to do, do it with thy might, for there is no worth nor device nor knowledge nor wisdom in the grave wither though goest".

== Houses and their colours ==
Each house is named after a former headmistress.

- Allen House: golden yellow
- Baskett House: pink
- Dewar House: blue
- Vyfhuis House: purple
- Wearn House: red

== Alumni ==
- Brenda DoHarris, writer
- Mona Williams who was born in 1943 in Guyana attended Bishops' High School on a scholarship. As a black student, she found attending a predominantly white colonial school challenging, although she found solace in learning ballet and traditional dance. Her 1995 biography was titled "Bishops: My Turbulent Colonial Youth".
