= School of the Nations (Guyana) =

Private school in Guyana

School of the Nations in Georgetown, Guyana is a private school in Guyana that offers secondary and tertiary education.

The school enrolls students from nursery school through secondary school and sixth form college and is inspired by the Baháʼí religion. An associated entity called Nations Incorporated offers higher education in Guyana. Nations University partnered with the University of Bedfordshire for postgraduate MBA courses in Guyana.

School of Nations (SON) began in 1996 (30 years ago) by Dr. Brian and Mrs. Pam O’Toole. Originally from the United Kingdom, they have resided in Guyana since 1978. The initial enrolment at the school was 180 students. Present enrolment, from Day Care to Sixth Form being over 800 students, the addition of the tertiary level students the Nations community is 4,300 students.

== Tertiary programmes ==
In 2004 School of the Nations began offering International Diplomas in Business and Teacher Training from Cambridge University and degrees in the Social Sciences and Law from the University of London (UK). Masters courses are offered in collaboration with the University of Bedfordshire in the UK in Psychology, Project Management, Tourism, MBA, and Public Health. The tertiary department of Nations is accommodated in a custom-built building of 17 classrooms, Library and Student Area. In addition, there are two Computer Labs, and Café.

== Security issues ==
In 2019, threats surfaced online against the institution’s student body via Facebook. On 27 January, Director Brian O'Toole was shot at his home in connection the online threats. Because of the online threats, cybersecurity experts were consulted to locate the individual responsible. In a report about the shooting, O'Toole said the shooter performed a dance from Fortnite after the attack. The school was closed for a week and armed security was paid to monitor the front gate. Dissatisfied with the investigation, parents staged a peaceful protest in front of the Ministry of Public Security, where they announced a GYD $1 million reward, in addition to one from O'Toole himself, for information leading to arrest of the shooter. Information that was circulated suggested that the shooter was expelled from the school and had gone to the United States after the attack.

== See also ==
- List of schools in Guyana
