= Cabinet of Guyana =

Government Cabinet of Guyana

- Irfaan Ali Administration
- Date formed: 2 August 2020

People and organisations
- President of Guyana: Mohamed Irfaan Ali
- No. of ministers: 28
- Member party: PPP/C
- Status in legislature: Majority Government 36 / 65

History
- Legislature term: Usually 5 years
- Incoming formation: 2025 Election

The Cabinet of the Cooperative Republic of Guyana is a principal component of the executive branch of the government of Guyana. Established by Article 106 of the Constitution of Guyana, the Cabinet consists of the President of Guyana, the Prime Minister, the Vice Presidents (if any additional Vice Presidents are appointed), and the Ministers appointed by the President. The Cabinet is tasked with aiding and advising the President as it relates to the general control and direction of the government. While the Cabinet is appointed by the President, it is also collectively responsible to Parliament.

== Allocation of Ministerial Portfolios ==
All portfolios and areas of responsibility that would fall to the Ministers are vested in the President under Article 107 of the constitution until these portfolios are allocated by the President to the charge of a specific Minister. The President may allocate multiple Ministries to one Minister either substantively, or on an acting basis.

== Current cabinet ==
As of September 13, 2025, following the 2025 General and Regional elections, the Cabinet of Guyana consists of the following members:

Name	Office/Portfolio
Dr. Mohamed Irfaan Ali	President (including all portfolios not assigned)
Brig. Ret. Mark Phillips	Prime Minister and First Vice President
Dr. Bharrat Jagdeo	Vice President
Mohabir Anil Nandlall	Attorney General and Minister of Legal Affairs
Gail Teixeira	Minister of Parliamentary Affairs and Governance
Zulfikar Mustapha	Minister of Agriculture
Vickash Ramkissoon	Minister in the Ministry of Agriculture
Sarah Browne	Minister of Amerindian Affairs
Charles S. Ramson	Minister of Culture, Youth, and Sport
Steven Jacobs	Minister in the Ministry of Culture, Youth, and Sport
Sonia Parag	Minister of Education
Ashni Kumar Singh	Senior Minister in the Office of the President with Responsibility for Finance
Hugh Todd	Minister of Foreign Affairs and International Cooperation
Dr. Frank C.S. Anthony	Minister of Health
Oneidge Walrond	Minister of Home Affairs
Collin Croal	Minister of Housing
Vanessa Benn	Minister in the Ministry of Housing
Dr. Vindhya V. Persaud	Minister of Human Services and Social Security
Keoma Griffith	Minister of Labour and Manpower Planning
Priya Manickchand	Minister of Local Government and Regional Development
Pauline Campbell-Sukhai	Minister in the Ministry of Local Government and Regional Development
Vickram Bharrat	Minister of Natural Resources
Bishop Juan Edghill	Minister of Public Works
Zulfikar Ali	Minister of Public Service, Government Efficiency and Implementation
Madanlall Ramraj	Minister in the Ministry of Public Works
Deodat Indar	Minister of Public Utilities and Aviation
Susan Rodrigues	Minister of Tourism, Industry, and Commerce
Warren Kwame McCoy	Minister in the Office of the Prime Minister
