= 2020 Guyanese general election =

- 2 March 2020

All 65 seats in the National Assembly 33 seats needed for a majority
- Turnout: 70.24% (▼0.79pp)
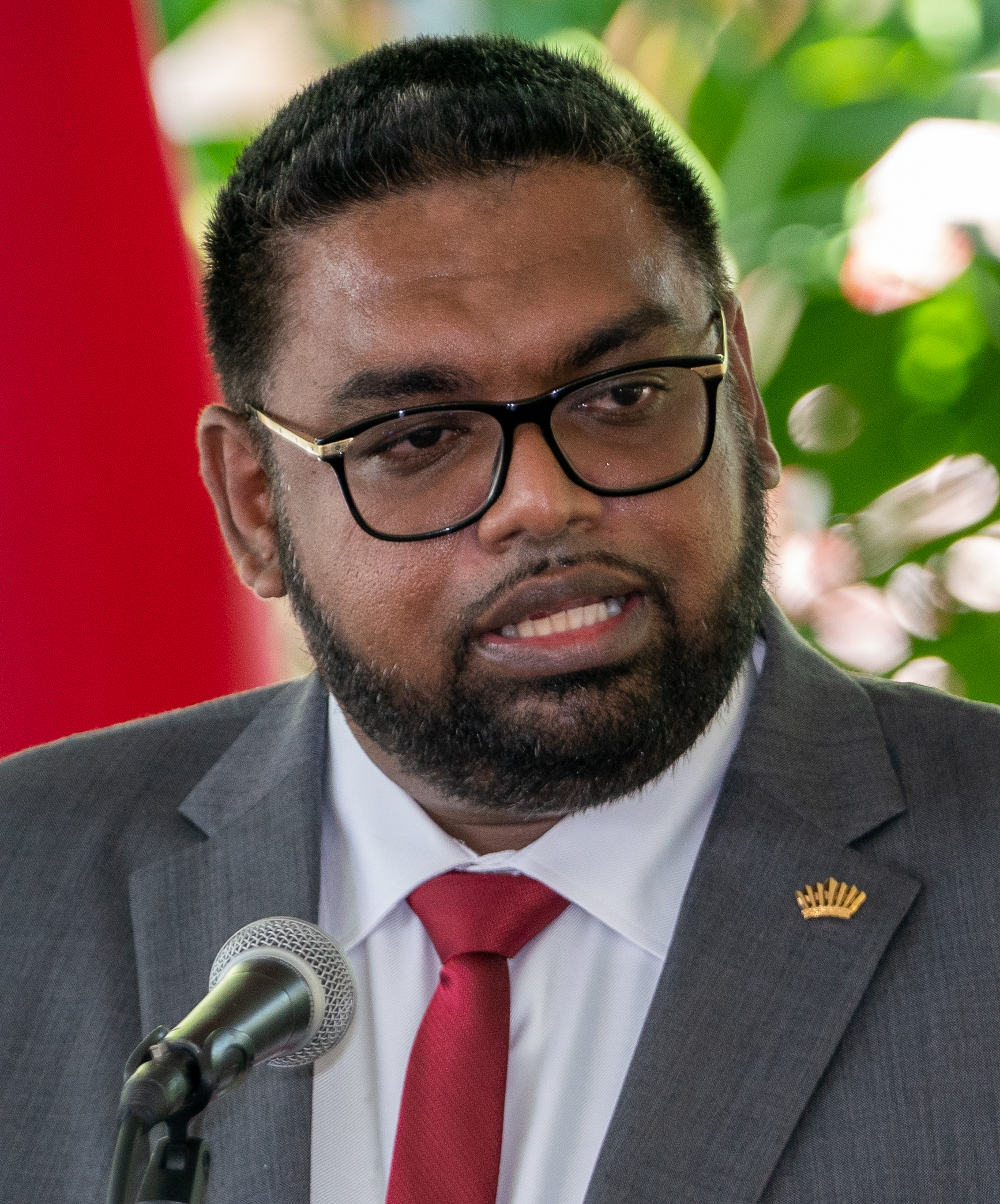

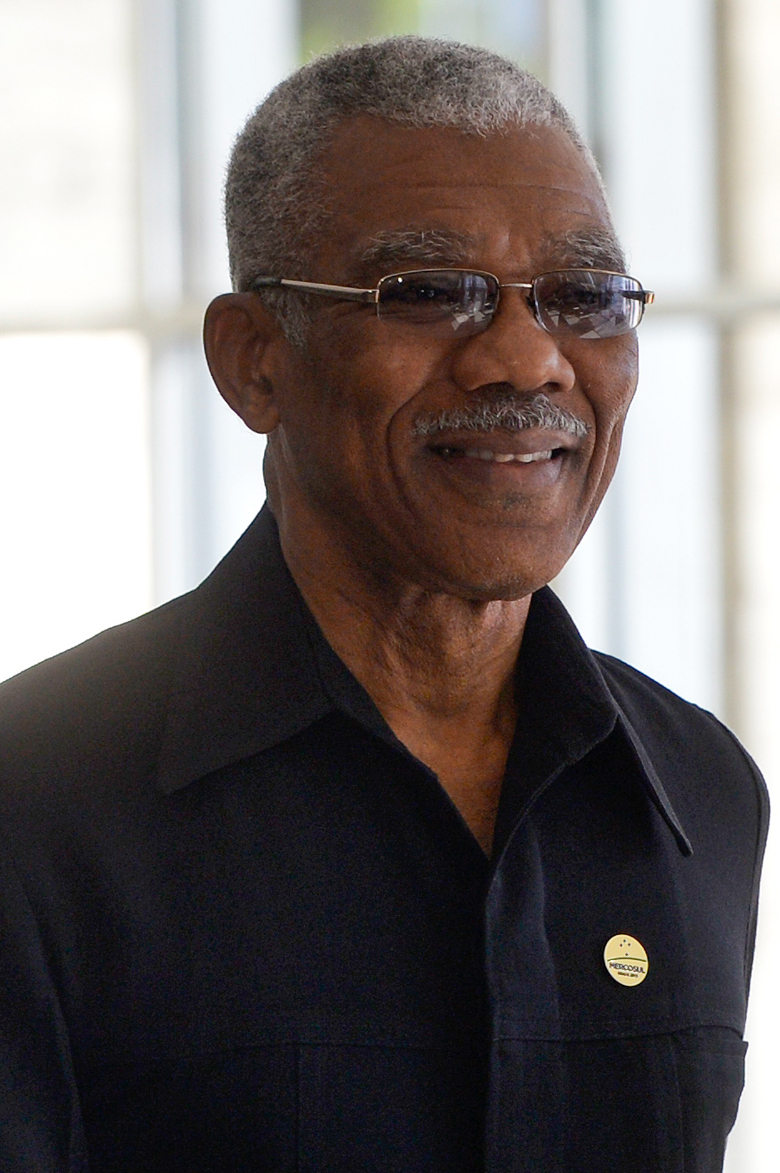

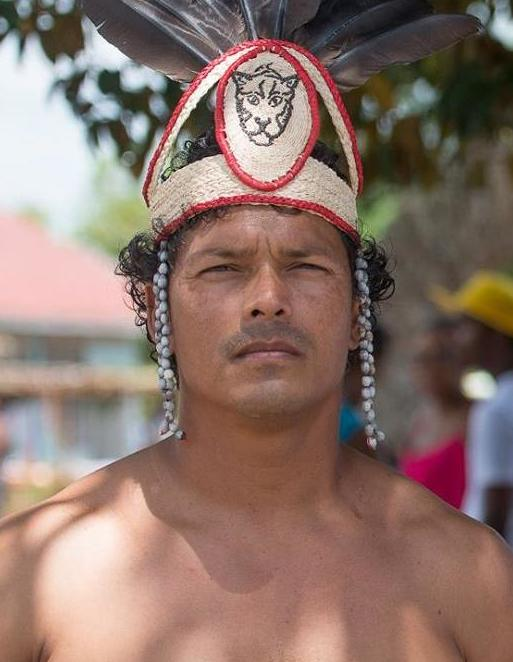
	First party	Second party	Third party
Candidate	Irfaan Ali (Note: Ali was selected as the Presidential candidate for the PPP/C in 2019, as the party only has a General-secretary and Executive Council, Bharrat Jagdeo would be recognized as the leader.)	David A. Granger	Lenox Shuman
Party	PPP/C	PNCR	LJP
Alliance		APNU+AFC	LJP–ANUG–TNM
Last election	49.19%, 32 seats	50.30%, 33 seats	New
Seats won	33	31	1
Seat change	▲1	▼2	▲1
Popular vote	233,336	217,920	5,214
Percentage	50.69%	47.34%	1.13%
Swing	▲1.50pp	▼2.96pp	New
- Results after the election post-recount
President before election
David A. Granger
PNCR
Elected President
Irfaan Ali
PPP/C

Snap general elections were held in Guyana on 2 March 2020. They were called early after the government of President David A. Granger lost a vote of no confidence by a margin of 33–32 on 21 December 2018, the government having held a one-seat majority since the 2015 elections. However, one of its own MPs, Charrandas Persaud of the Alliance for Change (AFC), voted with the opposition. Granger announced on 25 September 2019 that the elections would be held on 2 March 2020.

The elections were expected to be one of the most significant since Guyanese independence in 1966 because of one of the largest new discoveries of oil in the world off the coast of the country. According to ExxonMobil, Guyana could be producing 750,000 barrels of oil per day within five years, and the expected revenue from this oil would dwarf Guyana's previous US$3 billion GDP and transform its development possibilities.

Nine parties contested the elections for the presidency and for the 65 seats in the National Assembly. Although election day and the initial count was deemed to be free, fair and credible, the process of tabulating the votes was widely seen to have been fraudulent. The final region to declare gave a significant boost to the ruling APNU+AFC alliance, allowing it to overtake the main opposition party, the People's Progressive Party/Civic (PPP/C). Bruce Golding, a former Prime Minister of Jamaica, who was present during the elections, stated he had "never seen a more transparent attempt to alter the result of an election".

Attempts to swear David A. Granger back in as president were thwarted when an injunction was granted on 6 March by the High Court to block the declaration of the overall results of the elections until the matter could be heard and determined. Granger subsequently agreed to a recount, which was completed on 8 June. The recount showed that the PPP/C party won the most votes, with a bare majority of one seat. Thereafter, several more legal challenges were launched in an attempt to nullify the results of the recount and even to prevent tens of thousands of cast ballots from being registered as valid. However, on 2 August 2020, several days after the Court of Appeal ruled that the results of the recount be utilized as the official results of the election, PPP/C leader Irfaan Ali was ultimately sworn in as president, with Mark Phillips as Prime Minister.

== Background ==
Following the no-confidence motion, Attorney General Basil Williams filed a court case arguing that the no-confidence motion was invalid as an absolute majority of the 65 members of Parliament would constitute 34 votes rather than the 33 which the motion received. He also argued that Charrandas Persaud, whose vote decided the motion in the opposition's favour, was ineligible to be an MP as he holds dual Guyanese-Canadian citizenship, which is not permitted under the constitution. On 31 January 2019, Acting Chief Justice Roxane George-Wiltshire ruled that although Persaud was ineligible to sit in Parliament, the motion was nonetheless validly passed according to Article 165 of the Constitution, and the government of President Granger should have resigned in its aftermath to allow for early elections. The Attorney General rejected the Acting Chief Justice's ruling and stated that he would appeal against it at the Court of Appeal.

In February 2019, officials from the Guyana Elections Commission stated that there was not enough time left to organise elections by the constitutional deadline of mid-March. It was reported that the opposition might agree to postpone them until a later date.

On 22 March 2019, the Court of Appeal overturned the Acting Chief Justice's ruling, prompting the opposition People's Progressive Party/Civic (PPP/C) to appeal to the Caribbean Court of Justice, whose ruling on the matter would be final. On 18 June, the CCJ ruled that the no confidence vote had been validly passed by a majority of MPs, constitutionally necessitating fresh elections. Its ruling also stated that although Persaud may have been ineligible to be an MP due to his dual citizenship, his vote could not be nullified as the irregularity had not been taken up with the proper bodies within the designated timeframe following the 2015 elections.

== Electoral system ==
The 65 elected members of the National Assembly were elected using closed list proportional representation from a single nationwide 40-seat constituency and 10 sub-national constituencies with a total of 25 seats. Seats are allocated using the Hare quota.

The President was elected by a first-past-the-post double simultaneous vote system, whereby each list nominated a presidential candidate and the presidential election itself was won by the candidate of the list having a plurality.

== Campaign ==
On 19 January 2019, the PPP/C chose former Housing minister Irfaan Ali as its presidential candidate. Former Chief of Staff of the Guyana Defence Force, Brigadier Mark Phillips, was chosen as his running mate. Other potential choices included Juan Edghill MP and Hugh Todd, a lecturer at the University of Guyana.

On 16 June, the AFC chose Khemraj Ramjattan as its candidate for Prime Minister should the APNU+AFC coalition be returned to power with Granger as president.

An agreement was made by Liberty and Justice Party, The New Movement and A New and United Guyana to combine their lists for the national allocation of seats. The pre-election agreement was for the parties to share any seats won for a period of time relative to their proportion of the vote.

== Conduct ==
Elections day proceeded smoothly and efficiently. All political parties, plus local and international observers stated that the voting process, plus the counting of votes at polling stations, were free, fair and credible. Counting of votes was done in the presence of all political parties, as well as local and international observers. At every polling station, Statements of Poll (SOPs) were produced and signed by all political parties to verify their accuracy. These SOPs were displayed in public locations outside polling stations. Ballot boxes were then sealed, with each contesting party affixing their own tamper-proof seal to the box, along with some other security measures specified by Guyanese electoral law. By the end of election day, the elections commission (GECOM), local and international observers, the media and local individuals all had copies of the SOPs.

=== Tabulation ===
The SOPs were transmitted to Guyana's capital, Georgetown, and the ballot boxes were transported to the headquarters of GECOM. A tabulation process then began, to consolidate all 2,339 SOPs across Guyana's ten electoral districts. This tabulation process involved GECOM displaying each SOP, and all contesting parties confirming that the SOP was accurate. Once this check was complete, the SOPs numbers were entered into the overall vote total, from which a President and National Assembly would be installed.

By the evening of 3 March, nine of the ten districts had been tabulated successfully. A large number of SOPs for the final (and largest) district had also been tabulated. The results showed the PPP/C leading by around 51,000 votes. The process then started to derail once it became clear that the Granger government was heading for defeat. Returning Officer Clairmont Mingo said he felt unwell and was taken to hospital, resulting in the tabulation being suspended for several hours while a replacement for Mingo was sought. That replacement then felt unwell so the tabulation did not restart. Meanwhile, a data entry clerk was found attempting to load SOPs using a suspect laptop and flash drive.

The Minister of Foreign Affairs, Karen Cummings, arrived at the tabulation centre, summoned all foreign observers and threatened to revoke their accreditation. The British High Commissioner Greg Quinn and the former Barbadian Prime Minister Owen Arthur opposed these threats as inappropriate and possibly illegal. Cummings then left the building. On the morning of 5 March, police sought to clear the building, saying there was a bomb threat, but many representatives of the political parties and international observers refused to leave.

In the evening of 5 March, Mingo appeared at the top of a staircase, surrounded by police, and read out purported results for the final electoral district. These results did not match the SOPs of the political parties or of the local and international observers. Agents of the political parties raised their voices during Mr. Mingo's attempt to declare the results, but he persisted. Despite heavy criticism from party and international observers for the lack of transparency, results were released to the media by GECOM showing that the APNU+AFC coalition had won by 59,077 votes, a result that would give them a one-seat majority in the National Assembly.

The results released by GECOM came under further scrutiny due to the results of Region 4 bearing the signature of Volda Lawrence, the Minister of Health in the APNU+AFC government, instead of just the stamp and signature of the Returning Officer of that region. A joint statement from the American, British and Canadian governments and the European Union questioned the credibility of the Region 4 results. The Commonwealth, Organization of American States, the European Union and Carter Center stated clearly that "The tabulation of results for the election in Region 4 was interrupted and remains incomplete... the result of these elections cannot be credibly declared."

=== Court injunction ===
Later on 5 March, Granger addressed his supporters and thanked them for giving him another term. However, the PPP/C obtained a court injunction preventing the Region 4 returning officer from declaring the results until further verification had taken place.

APNU+AFC continued preparations to swear in Granger.

On 11 March, the Supreme Court annulled the results of Region 4, ruled that a partial recount in the election must take place, ordering that Region Four continue verifying votes. According to the BBC, "Judge Roxane George also ruled the electoral body should not declare a winner before the recount is finished." She ordered that the tabulation be completed using official SOPs in the presence of party agents.

=== Tabulation resumes ===
When the tabulation resumed on 12 March, Mingo attempted to read results directly from a spreadsheet. In the words of the European Union Observer Mission, this was "in blatant defiance of the Chief Justice's explicit call for transparency and the use of SOPs". Sustained objections from the political parties forced an adjournment while the Secretary-General of the 54-nation Commonwealth added to calls to adhere to the Chief Justice's rulings, stating that to do otherwise would be "a serious violation of the fundamental political values of the Commonwealth" When the process resumed on 13 March, Mingo read from a set of purported SOPs that were not visible to anybody else present. These SOPs did not match the SOPs in the possession of party agents or any of the local and international observers.

In protest at the violation of the Chief Justice's instructions, the Ambassadors of the United States, European Union, United Kingdom and Canada walked out of the tabulation centre and made it clear that any declaration based on the results being announced by Mingo would not be seen as internationally credible. Despite this, Mingo persisted and declared unverified results on the night of the 13 March.

=== CARICOM intervenes ===
The Chair of CARICOM and Prime Minister of Barbados, Mia Mottley, led a team of five Caribbean Prime Ministers to mitigate the crisis on 11 and 12 March, meeting with Granger and opposition leader Bharrat Jagdeo. Following the development at the tabulation centre, on 14 March Mottley announced that, according to Stabroek News, "an independent high-level Caribbean Community team is [set] to supervise a full recount of the ballots cast in all ten regions at Guyana's elections based on an agreement by President David Granger and Opposition Leader Bharrat Jagdeo."

A five-person high-level team was rapidly assembled and arrived in Guyana on 15 March. GECOM prepared for the recount to start. However, an election candidate (in the concurrent regional elections) from the APNU+AFC party obtained a court objection blocking the recount and the CARICOM team left on 17 March.

Prime Minister Mottley stated that "it is clear that there are forces in Guyana that do not want to see the votes recounted."

=== Threat of international sanctions ===
International condemnation of the Granger Government grew, with the United States and European Union making it clear that a Government based on the Mingo declaration of March 13 would not be seen as legitimate, and that sanctions would be placed on anyone who benefitted from that declaration.

The Government barred several international observers including the Carter Center, over strong objections from the US and Canadian Governments.

=== Recount goes ahead ===
After almost two months, the recount started on 6 May. The Government placed strict limits on the number of recount stations that would be allowed, citing COVID-19 precautions.

As a result, the planned 25 days for the recount was insufficient, but the recount was completed on the 8 June.

The results were publicly available, and almost exactly matched the SOPs in the possession of all the political parties and the observers. The results showed a victory for the PPP/C's presidential candidate with the PPP/C winning 33 seats in the National Assembly. APNU+AFC won 31 seats, and three of the smaller parties shared 1 seat in accordance with the agreement they made before the election.

Statements of Recount (SORs) were produced to mirror the SOPs from Election Day. These SORs provided proof that the results announced by Mingo on March 13 had inflated APNU+AFC votes by 19,116 votes and reduced PPP/C votes by 3,689.

According to Guyana's constitution, Irfaan Ali was deemed president-elect, and his swearing in should follow the formal declaration of the winner by GECOM.

== Results ==
Party	Presidential candidate	Initial results		Recount		Seats	+/–
Party	Presidential candidate	Votes	%	Votes	%	Seats	+/–
People's Progressive Party/Civic	Irfaan Ali	229,481	48.26	233,336	50.69	33	1
APNU+AFC	David Granger	236,928	49.82	217,920	47.34	31	–2
Liberty and Justice Party	Lenox Shuman	2,667	0.56	2,657	0.58	1	New
A New and United Guyana	Ralph Ramkarran	2,286	0.48	2,313	0.50	1	New
The New Movement	Asha Kissoon	227	0.05	244	0.05	1	New
Change Guyana	Robert Badal	2,030	0.43	1,953	0.42	0	New
People's Republic Party	Phyllis Jordan	864	0.18	889	0.19	0	New
The Citizenship Initiative	Rhonda Lam-Singh	680	0.14	680	0.15	0	New
United Republican Party	Vishnu Bandhu	393	0.08	360	0.08	0	0
Total		475,556	100.00	460,352	100.00	65	0
Valid votes		475,556	99.19	460,352	99.09		
Invalid/blank votes		3,897	0.81	4,211	0.91		
Total votes		479,453	100.00	464,563	100.00		
Registered voters/turnout		661,378	72.49	661,378	70.24		
Source: GECOM, GECOM (candidates), TCI

=== List of elected MPs ===
Name	Party	Coalition	Alliance	Constituency
Alister Saturnius Charlie	PPP/C	-	-	IX-Upper Takutu-Upper Essequibo
Amanza Owana Rukia Walton-Desir	PNCR	APNU	APNU+AFC	National Top-Up
Anand Persaud	PPP/C	-	-	National Top-Up
Annette Natasha Ferguson	PNCR	APNU	APNU+AFC	National Top-Up
Bhagmattie Veerasammy	PPP/C	-	-	National Top-Up
Bharrat Jagdeo	PPP/C	-	-	National Top-Up
Bheri Sygmond Ramsaran	PPP/C	-	-	National Top-Up
Catherine Andrea Hughes	AFC	-	APNU+AFC	IV-Demerara-Mahaica
Charles Shiva Ramson	PPP/C	-	-	National Top-Up
Christopher Anderson Jones	PNCR	APNU	APNU+AFC	National Top-Up
Collin David Croal	PPP/C	-	-	I-Barima-Waini
Coretta Ann McDonald	PNCR	APNU	APNU+AFC	National Top-Up
David Anthony Patterson	AFC	-	APNU+AFC	National Top-Up
Dawn Hastings-Williams	PNCR	APNU	APNU+AFC	VII-Cuyuni-Mazaruni
Deodat Indar	PPP/C	-	-	National Top-Up
Deonarine Ramsaroop	AFC	-	APNU+AFC	IV-Demerara-Mahaica
Devin Lynton Sears	AFC	-	APNU+AFC	X-Upper Demerara-Berbice
Dharamkumar Seeraj	PPP/C	-	-	National Top-Up
Dineshwar Nand Jaiprashad	PNCR	APNU	APNU+AFC	VI-East Berbice-Corentyne
Faizal Mohamoud Jaffarally	PPP/C	-	-	V-East Berbice-Corentyne
Frank Christopher Stanislaus Anthony	PPP/C	-	-	National Top-Up
Gail Teixeira	PPP/C	-	-	VII-Cuyuni-Mazaruni
Ganesh Adjtya Mahipaul	PNCR	APNU	APNU+AFC	III-Essequibo Islands-West Demerara
Geeta Chandan-Edmond	PNCR	APNU	APNU+AFC	National Top-Up
Haimraj Bernard Rajkumar	AFC	-	APNU+AFC	National Top-Up
Hugh Hilton Todd	PPP/C	-	-	IV-Mahaica-Berbice
Jennifer Reginalda Ann Westford	PPP/C	-	-	National Top-Up
Jermaine Adrian Figueira	PNCR	APNU	APNU+AFC	X-Upper Demerara-Berbice
Joseph Harmon	PNCR	APNU	APNU+AFC	National Top-Up
Joseph Linden Fitzclarence Hamilton	PPP/C	-	-	National Top-Up
Juan A. Edghill	PPP/C	-	-	National Top-Up
Juretha Vanessa Fernandes	AFC	-	APNU+AFC	National Top-Up
Karen Roslyn Vanessa Cummings	PNCR	APNU	APNU+AFC	National Top-Up
Khemraj Ramjattan	AFC	-	APNU+AFC	National Top-Up
Lee Gendre Hakkim Williams	PPP/C	-	-	National Top-Up
Lenox Ron O'Dell Shuman	LJP	ANUG-LJP-TNM	-	National Top-Up
Mark Phillips	PPP/C	-	-	National Top-Up
Maureen Allison Philadelphia	PNCR	APNU	APNU+AFC	IV-Mahaica-Berbice
Mohabir Anil Nandlall	PPP/C	-	-	National Top-Up
Natasha Singh-Lewis	PNCR	APNU	APNU+AFC	National Top-Up
Nicolette Odella Henry	PNCR	APNU	APNU+AFC	National Top-Up
Nigel Dharamllal	PPP/C	-	-	II-Pomeroon-Supenaam
Nima Natacha Flue-Bess	PNCR	APNU	APNU+AFC	IV-Mahaica-Berbice
Pauline Rose Ann Sukhai	PPP/C	-	-	National Top-Up
Priya Manickchand	PPP/C	-	-	III-Essequibo Islands-West Demerara
Raphael Trotman	AFC	-	APNU+AFC	National Top-Up
Richard Elroy Sinclair	PNCR	APNU	APNU+AFC	VIII-Potaro-Siparuni
Ronald Cox	PNCR	APNU	APNU+AFC	I-Barima-Waini
Roysdale Alton Forde	PNCR	APNU	APNU+AFC	National Top-Up
Sanjeev Jaichandra Datadin	PPP/C	-	-	National Top-Up
Sonia Parag	PPP/C	-	-	National Top-Up
Seepaul Narine	PPP/C	-	-	National Top-Up
Sherod Avery Duncan	AFC	-	APNU+AFC	National Top-Up
Shurwayne Holder	PNCR	APNU	APNU+AFC	II-Pomeroon-Supenaam
Susan Rodrigues	PPP/C	-	-	IV-Mahaica-Berbice
Tabitha Joy Sarabo-Halley	WPA	APNU	APNU+AFC	National Top-Up
Tandika Simone Smith	PPP/C	-	-	III-Essequibo Islands-West Demerara
Vickram Bharrat	PPP/C	-	-	National Top-Up
Vincent Patrick Henry	PNCR	APNU	APNU+AFC	National Top-Up
Vinceroy Hansel Jordan	PNCR	APNU	APNU+AFC	V-East Berbice-Corentyne
Vindhya Persaud	PPP/C	-	-	IV-Mahaica-Berbice
Vishwa Deva Budhram Mahadeo	PPP/C	-	-	VI-East Berbice-Corentyne
Warren Kwame Eusi McCoy	PPP/C	-	-	National Top-Up
Yvonne Fredericks-Pearson	PPP/C	-	-	National Top-Up
Zulfikar Mustapha	PPP/C	-	-	VI-East Berbice-Corentyne
Source: The Official Gazette of Guyana

=== Recount results by region ===
Region	APNU+AFC			PPP/C			LJP		ANUG		TNM		LJP+ANUG+TNM			Hare quota	Total votes	Total seats
Region	Votes	%	Seats	Votes	%	Seats	Votes	%	Votes	%	Votes	%	Votes	%	Seats	Hare quota	Total votes	Total seats
Barima-Waini	3,909	32.28	1	8,002	66.07	1	170	1.40	0	0.00	0	0.00	170	1.40	0	6056	12,111	2
Pomeroon-Supenaam	7,340	27.57	1	18,785	70.56	1	121	0.45	85	0.32	0	–	206	0.77	0	13311	26,621	2
Essequibo Islands-West Demerara	23,808	32.80	1	47,851	65.92	2	0	–	302	0.42	56	0.08	358	0.49	0	24197	72,592	3
Demerara-Mahaica	116,941	57.87	4	80,920	40.04	3	755	0.37	1426	0.71	135	0.07	2316	1.15	0	28868	202,077	7
Mahaica-Berbice	14,502	43.79	1	18,326	55.33	1	0	–	88	0.27	10	0.03	98	0.30	0	16560	33,119	2
East Berbice-Corentyne	20,399	31.59	1	43,440	67.28	2	0	–	164	0.25	16	0.02	180	0.28	0	21522	64,567	3
Cuyuni-Mazaruni	4,813	50.18	1	3,728	38.87	1	884	9.22	77	0.80	0	–	961	10.02	0	4796	9,592	2
Potaro-Siparuni	2,152	46.13	1	2,052	43.99	0	450	9.65	0	–	11	0.24	461	9.88	0	4665	4,665	1
Upper Takutu-Upper Essequibo	4,887	39.86	0	7,070	57.66	1	277	2.26	0	–	0	–	277	2.26	0	12261	12,261	1
Upper Demerara-Berbice	19,169	84.27	2	3,162	13.90	0	0	–	171	0.75	16	0.07	187	0.82	0	11374	22,747	2
Total seats	217,920	47.34	31	233,336	50.69	33	2657	0.58	2313	0.50	244	0.05	5214	1.13	1	7082	460,352	65
Regional seats			13			12									0			25
National seats			18			21									1			40
Source: The Citizenship Initiative Guyana Election Law

== Resolution ==
Following the recount, the GECOM delayed declaring a winner. The APNU+AFC alliance refused to sign the recount certification, claiming fraud, based on a report written by Keith Lowenfield, CEO of GECOM. In an about-face from his previous position, Lowenfield later claimed that the voting process had been fraudulent and that over 60% of the votes counted on election day were fraudulent. Of the 40% of votes he claimed were valid, more than two-thirds went to the APNU+AFC alliance. On 14 June, Granger said that Lowenfield "did remarkably well" in his conduct of the elections and subsequent processes.

Opposition parties called on Granger to accept defeat. The Ambassador of the European Union had said: "It was impossible to cheat... on Elections Day". According to the former Prime Minister of Barbados Owen Arthur, the recount results were "incontrovertible". When asked for his views on what would happen if the Granger government refused to accept the results, Arthur said "I find it almost impossible for them [APNU+AFC] to feel that that can be done. It would be tantamount to a coup. It would be unusual and would have implication for the future of Guyana."

On 23 June Lowenfield released a new set of results, in which he had invalidated over 115,000 votes. The new results had the APNU+AFC as the winning party with 171,825 votes and 33 seats and the PPP/C in second place with 166,343 votes and 31 seats. However, the Caribbean Court of Justice issued a ruling barring GECOM from declaring the figures as the official results, while the release of the new figures was criticised by Mottley.

=== International reactions ===
U.S. imposed sanctions on Guyana on 15 July 2020, citing that "Visa permits have been revoked for the persons complicit in undermining Guyana's democratic values."

U.S. Secretary of State Mike Pompeo called for Granger's resignation. Tariq Ahmed and Liz Sugg, UK foreign office ministers also made calls for his resignation. Canada said that it would use all tools at its disposal to ensure peaceful transfer of power. Ralph Gonsalves, Prime minister of Saint Vincent and Grenadines and OAS also called for the Guyanese President to accept the outcome of the recount.

The State Government of Roraima, Brazil acknowledged Irfaan Ali as the new Guyanese President. It expressed concerns about electoral instability in Guyana.

The US visa restrictions were viewed as "Trump administration's interference into Guyanese elections" by Congressman Hakeem Jeffries and Congresswoman Yvette Clarke.

=== Chief Justice ruling ===
On 20 July Acting Chief Justice Roxane George-Wiltshire ruled that as the Caribbean Court of Justice had endorsed the recount of votes that the results declared on 13 March could not be reinstated. She said that "Lowenfield is not a lone ranger and has to come under GECOM and its chair." She also said that the court could not invalidate the election results, as the matter had been adjudicated at the upper courts."

=== Court of Appeals ruling ===
On 30 July 2020, the Court of Appeals, based on petition filed by APNU+AFC Supporter Misenga Jones, ruled unanimously that the results of recount of the elections were legitimate and should be used to declare winner of the election.

=== Final outcome ===
On 2 August 2020, several days after the Court of Appeal ruled that the results of the recount should stand as the official results, PPP/C leader Irfaan Ali was sworn in as president and Mark Phillips as Prime Minister.

== Aftermath ==
After four years, a trial of nine defendants, for conspiracy to defraud in the 2020 General and Regional Elections, finally got underway on 29 July 2024. It was expected to last at least six weeks, but after just three hearings, on 7 August the presiding Magistrate, Leron Daly, went on medical leave and the case was adjourned to 17 September 2024. In November, Magistrate Daly was still on medical leave, so the case was transferred to Acting Chief Magistrate Faith McGusty.

== See also ==
- 2020 Guyanese protests
