= 2025 Guyanese general election =

- 1 September 2025

All 65 seats in the National Assembly 33 seats needed for a majority
- Registered: 757,690 (▲14.56%)
- Turnout: 58.41% (▼11.83pp)
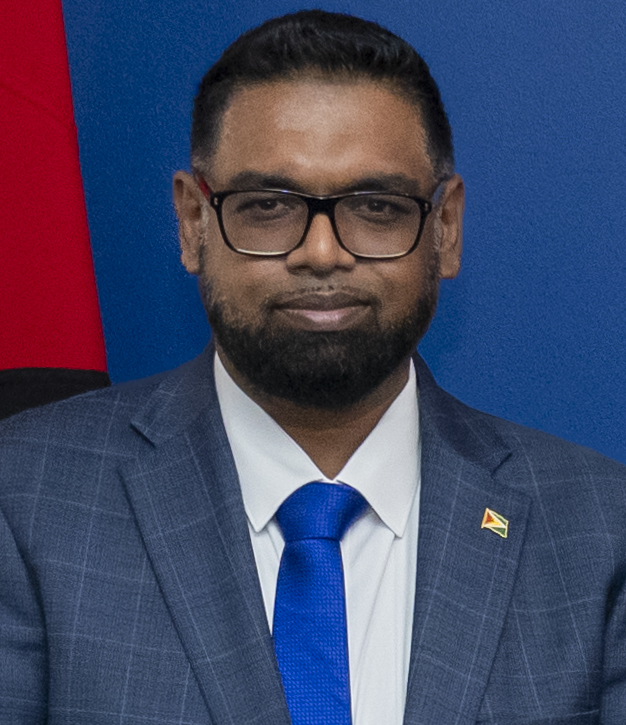

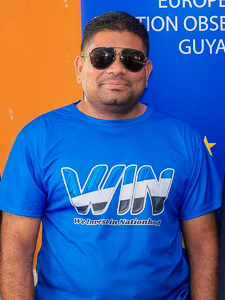

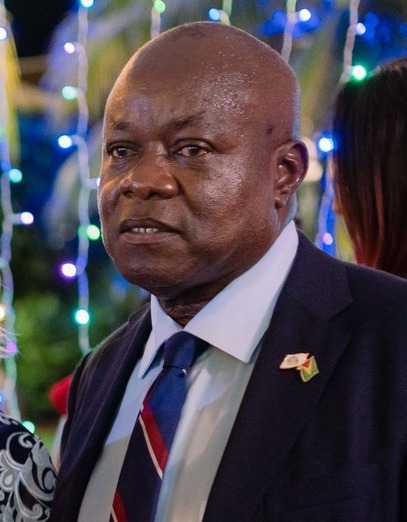

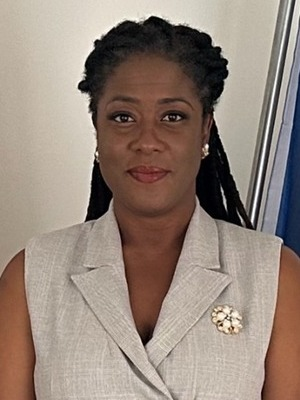
	First party	Second party
Candidate	Irfaan Ali	Azruddin Mohamed
Party	PPP/C	WIN
Last election	50.69%, 33 seats	New Party
Seats won	36	16
Seat change	▲3	▲16
Popular vote	242,498	109,066
Percentage	55.31%	24.87%
Swing	▲4.62 pp	New
	Third party	Fourth party
Candidate	Aubrey Norton	Amanza Walton Desir
Party	PNCR	FG
Alliance	APNU	FGM
Last election	47.34%, 31 seats	New Party
Seats won	12	1
Seat change	▼19	▲1
Popular vote	77,998	4,326
Percentage	17.79%	0.99%
Swing	▼29.55 pp	New
- Results by region
President before election
Mohamed Irfaan Ali
PPP/C
Elected President
Mohamed Irfaan Ali
PPP/C

General elections were held in Guyana on 1 September 2025. The result was a victory for President Irfaan Ali and the governing People's Progressive Party/Civic, who won 36 seats, an increase of three from the 2020 election. The declaration of the result was made by GECOM on 7 September 2025 at midnight, and Ali was inaugurated later that day.

The We Invest in Nationhood political party, led by US-sanctioned businessman Azruddin Mohamed, which was formed only three months prior to the election, rose to second place, replacing the People's National Congress Reform-led A Partnership for National Unity alliance as Guyana's primary opposition, capturing two electoral districts, including Upper Demerara-Berbice, which had long been recognized as an immovable stronghold for the PNCR. It was the first time since its foundation that the PNCR had failed to become either the governing or main opposition party.

== Background ==
The People's Progressive Party/Civic (PPP/C) returned to government following the 2 March 2020 general election, in which they defeated the governing APNU+AFC coalition. The PPP/C's presidential candidate, Irfaan Ali, became the 10th President of Guyana. However results were not finalized for four months, due to allegations of vote rigging following an initial APNU+AFC win, until international pressure led to a recount and PPP/C's win.

In the final results for 2020, the PPP/C won 33 seats and 50.69% of the vote, giving it a majority of one in the National Assembly. The APNU+AFC received 31 seats and 47.34% of the vote, a loss of two seats. The remaining seat was awarded to the LJP—ANUG—TNM alliance, which received a combined total of 1.13% of the vote.

The Constitution of Guyana limits the term of the National Assembly and the president to five years. In accordance with this term limit, Ali dissolved the 12th National Assembly on 3 July 2025 and announced elections for 1 September.

== Electoral system ==
The 65 members of the National Assembly are elected using closed list proportional representation from a single nationwide 40-seat constituency and 10 sub-national constituencies with a total of 25 seats. Seats are allocated using the Hare quota.

The president is elected by a first-past-the-post double simultaneous vote system, whereby each list nominates a presidential candidate and the presidential election itself is won by the candidate of the list having a plurality.

== Campaign ==
=== Major parties contesting ===
The PPP/C opted to re-nominate the ticket of Irfaan Ali and Mark Phillips, with the party's General Secretary Bharrat Jagdeo citing the accomplishments of the administration during the term. On 18 June 2025, the largest opposition alliance in the previous parliament, APNU, announced PNCR leader Aubrey Norton would be their presidential candidate, with Member of Parliament Juretha Fernandes as his running mate.

=== Electoral alliances ===
Three alliances were formed by opposition parties ahead of the election:

On 30 May 2025, A Partnership for National Unity (APNU) and the Working People's Alliance (WPA), previously a member of the APNU, signed a coalition agreement. The WPA had left the coalition in 2020, dissatisfied by its low number of candidates on the joint list.

On 29 June 2025, We Invest in Nationhood (WIN), led by businessman Azruddin Mohamed, announced a joinder agreement with A New and United Guyana. Under the agreement, ANUG would effectively merge with WIN, adopting its logo, presidential candidate and joining the list, while still retaining its right to exist as an individual party.

A coalition agreement was adopted on 1 July 2025 by Forward Guyana, The People's Movement and the Vigilant Political Action Committee where the parties agreed to contest the election as one entity, opting to label the joinder the "Forward Guyana Movement".

=== Endorsements ===
Type	PPP/C	APNU	FGM	WIN—ANUG
Media	Frederick Kissoon (Columnist); Michael Anthony (former boxer, Olympic bronze medalist)			
Public figures	Sydney Allicock (former vice president of Guyana); C.N Sharma (Leader of the Justice for All Party); Geeta Chandan-Edmond (former PNCR member of parliament, former general secretary of the PNCR); Asha Kissoon (Deputy Speaker of the National Assembly and leader of The New Movement); Lenox Shuman (Leader of The Liberty and Justice Party); Jermaine Figueria (former PNCR member of parliament); Vishnu Bandhu (leader of the United Republican Party); Daniel Seeram (Chairman of the Demerara-Mahaica RDC); Samuel Sandy (vice-chairman of the Demerara-Mahaica RDC); Ismail Muhammad-Al-Cush (AFC Member of the Mahaica-Berbice RDC); Gifford Marshall (former mayor of Bartica); Steve Ninvalle (Director of Sport); David Daniels (Chairman of the Cuyuni-Mazaruni AFC); Richard Van-West Charles (former PNCR executive member); James Bond (former PNCR member of parliament); Bissoondyal Singh (president of the Guyana Cricket Board); Ronaldo Alphonso (president of the Guyana Gold and Diamond Miners Association)	David Granger (9th President of Guyana, former leader of the PNC/R)	Ronald Bulkan (former minister of communities)	Tabitha Sarabo-Halley (former WPA member of parliament); Natasha Singh-Lewis (former PNCR member of parliament); Dawn Hastings-Williams (former PNCR member of parliament, former general secretary of the PNCR); Mark Goring (Vice-Chairman of the Upper Demerara-Berbice RDC)
Unions and business associations	Small Miners Association; Guyana Motor Racing and Sports Club			

== Conduct ==
Several international groups deployed observers for the election, including the Carter Center, the Organization of American States (OAS) and Caricom.

In a pre-election statement, the Carter Center noted the size of Guyana's voter list, in which there were 757,000 registered voters out of a total population of 794,000, and criticized the failure of authorities to release the findings of the 2022 population census, calling this a "regrettable lapse" which "obscures public understanding of basic population demographics and their potential relation to the size of the voter list".

After his team visited 342 polling stations on election day, former Jamaican prime minister Bruce Golding, the head of the OAS mission, said that overall, things had gone smoothly and that election officials had acted with professionalism.

The observer mission from the European Union, headed by Polish MEP Robert Biedroń, described election day as "peaceful" but expressed concern about the ruling PPP/C leveraging its incumbency advantage to distort the fairness of the process. It also highlighted a lack of transparency and accountability caused by inadequate campaign finance rules.

== Results ==
As results were finalised on 3 September, it became clear that incumbent president Irfaan Ali had won a second term, with his PPP/C party winning eight of the ten regions, over 55% of the popular vote, and 36 Assembly seats. In what was described by the Stabroek News as a "meteoric rise", newcomer party We Invest in Nationhood came second, with 24% of the votes cast and 16 seats. The previous opposition Partnership for National Unity alliance came third with 17% of the vote, with 12 seats, down 9 from the previous election. The last Assembly seat went to the Forward Guyana Movement and will likely be taken up by its presidential candidate, Amanza Walton Desir. A partial recount of votes in Regions 4 and 5, requested by APNU, began on 4 September and concluded the following day with unchanged seats allocation.

The Elections Commission announced the final results, including seat counts, on 6 September and President Ali was sworn in for the 2025–2030 term the following day.

Party	Presidential candidate	Votes	%	Seats	+/–
People's Progressive Party/Civic	Irfaan Ali	242,498	55.31	36	+3
We Invest in Nationhood	Azruddin Mohamed	109,066	24.87	16	New
A Partnership for National Unity	Aubrey Norton	77,998	17.79	12	–10
Forward Guyana Movement	Amanza Walton Desir	4,326	0.99	1	New
Alliance for Change	Nigel Hughes	3,610	0.82	0	–9
Assembly for Liberty and Prosperity	Simona Broomes	969	0.22	0	New
Total		438,467	100.00	65	0
Valid votes		438,467	99.08		
Invalid/blank votes		4,083	0.92		
Total votes		442,550	100.00		
Registered voters/turnout		757,690	58.41		
Source: Stabroek News, Carter Center, GECOM, calculation based on

=== By region ===
The PPP/C won in eight of the country's ten regions, with WIN securing victories in Regions 7 and 10.

Region		APNU			PPP/C			WIN			FGM			AFC		ALP		Hare quota	Total votes	Total seats
#	Name	Votes	%	Seats	Votes	%	Seats	Votes	%	Seats	Votes	%	Seats	Votes	%	Votes	%	Hare quota	Total votes	Total seats
1	Barima-Waini	469	3.06	0.06	9030	58.92	1.18	5716	37.30	0.75	75	0.49	0.01	35	0.23	0	0.00	7663	15325	2
2	Pomeroon-Supenaam	1835	6.81	0.14	17478	64.85	1.30	7400	27.46	0.55	147	0.55	0.01	91	0.34	0	0.00	13476	26951	2
3	Essequibo Islands-West Demerara	8992	12.67	0.38	48055	67.69	2.03	12969	18.27	0.55	522	0.74	0.02	322	0.45	138	0.19	23666	70998	3
4	Demerara-Mahaica	46956	25.97	1.82	87536	48.42	3.39	41607	23.01	1.61	2431	1.34	0.09	1765	0.98	497	0.27	25827	180792	7
5	Mahaica-Berbice	6480	20.82	0.42	18432	59.22	1.18	5816	18.69	0.37	128	0.41	0.01	208	0.67	58	0.19	15561	31122	2
6	East Berbice-Corentyne	6223	10.21	0.31	41320	67.77	2.03	12623	20.70	0.62	361	0.59	0.02	315	0.52	132	0.22	20325	60974	3
7	Cuyuni-Mazaruni	983	9.70	0.19	3577	35.30	0.71	5098	50.32	1.01	0	0.00	0.00	415	4.10	59	0.58	5066	10132	2
8	Potaro-Siparuni	276	4.79	0.05	2872	49.80	0.50	2562	44.43	0.44	0	0.00	0.00	57	0.99	0	0.00	5767	5767	1
9	Upper Takutu-Upper Essequibo	450	2.92	0.03	9938	64.55	0.65	4817	31.29	0.31	0	0.00	0.00	192	1.25	0	0.00	15397	15397	1
10	Upper Demerara-Berbice	5334	25.39	0.51	4260	20.28	0.41	10458	49.78	1.00	662	3.15	0.06	210	1.00	85	0.40	10505	21009	2
Total		77,998	17.79	12	242,498	55.31	36	109,066	24.87	16	4326	0.99	1	3610	0.82	969	0.22	6746	438,467	65
Regional seats				4			13			8										25
National seats				8			23			8			1							

=== List of elected MPs ===
Name	Party	Coalition	Constituency
Alister Saturnius Charlie	PPP/C	PPP/C	National Top-Up
Amanza Owana Rukia Walton-Desir	FG	FGM	National Top-Up
Anand Persaud	PPP/C	PPP/C	National Top-Up
Andre Alexus Lewis	WIN	WIN	National Top-Up
Ashni Kumar Singh	PPP/C	PPP/C	National Top-Up
Azruddin Intiaz Mohamed	WIN	WIN	National Top-Up
Beverley Anna Cornelius	WIN	WIN	II-Pomeroon-Supenaam
Bhagmattie Veerasammy	PPP/C	PPP/C	National Top-Up
Bharrat Jagdeo	PPP/C	PPP/C	National Top-Up
Charles Shiva Ramson	PPP/C	PPP/C	National Top-Up
Collin David Croal	PPP/C	PPP/C	I-Barima-Waini
Coretta Ann McDonald	PNCR	APNU	National Top-Up
David Samuel Augustus Hinds	WPA	APNU	National Top-Up
Dawn Hastings-Williams	WIN	WIN	VII-Cuyuni-Mazaruni
Deodat Indar	PPP/C	PPP/C	National Top-Up
Deon Wayne La Cruz	WIN	WIN	I-Barima-Waini
Dexter Mark Godfrey Todd	PNCR	APNU	National Top-Up
Duarte Osbert Hetsberger	WIN	WIN	National Top-Up
Frank Christopher Stanislaus Anthony	PPP/C	PPP/C	National Top-Up
Gail Teixeira	PPP/C	PPP/C	VII-Cuyuni-Mazaruni
Ganesh Aditya Mahipaul	PNCR	APNU	National Top-Up
Gobin Heralall Harbhajan	WIN	WIN	VI-East Berbice-Corentyne
Gordon Nicholas Barker	WIN	WIN	III-Essequibo Islands-West Demerara
Hugh Hilton Todd	PPP/C	PPP/C	National Top-Up
James Anthony Bond	PPP/C	PPP/C	National Top-Up
Janelle Devi Sweatnam	WIN	WIN	IV-Demerara-Mahaica
Jennifer Reginalda Ann Westford	PPP/C	PPP/C	National Top-Up
Juan Anthony Edghill	PPP/C	PPP/C	National Top-Up
Juretha Vanessa Fernandes	PNCR	APNU	National Top-Up
Kuice Sharma Solomon	PNCR	APNU	X-Upper Demerara-Berbice
Lenox Ron O'Dell Shuman	LJP	PPP/C	National Top-Up
Mark Anthony Phillips	PPP/C	PPP/C	National Top-Up
Mohabir Anil Nandlall	PPP/C	PPP/C	IV-Demerara-Mahaica
Nandranie Singh	ANUG	WIN	National Top-Up
Natasha Singh-Lewis	WIN	WIN	National Top-Up
Nima Natacha Flue-Bess	PNCR	APNU	IV-Demerara-Mahaica
Odessa Tameisa Primus	WIN	WIN	National Top-Up
Oneidge Gillian Walrond-Allicock	PPP/C	PPP/C	National Top-Up
Pauline Rose Ann Campbell-Sukhai	PPP/C	PPP/C	VIII-Potaro-Siparuni
Peter Ronald Ramsaroop	PPP/C	PPP/C	National Top-Up
Priya Devi Manickchand	PPP/C	PPP/C	III-Essequibo Islands-West Demerara
Riaz Zakeer Rupnarain	PNCR	APNU	National Top-Up
Ryan Michael Richards	WIN	WIN	X-Upper Demerara-Berbice
Saiku Franklin Andrews	PNCR	APNU	National Top-Up
Sanjeev Jaichandra Datadin	PPP/C	PPP/C	National Top-Up
Sarah Alyssa Brown-Shadeck	PPP/C	PPP/C	National Top-Up
Seepaul Narine	PPP/C	PPP/C	National Top-Up
Sherod Avery Duncan	PNCR	APNU	IV-Demerara-Mahaica
Sonia Natasha Latchman	PPP/C	PPP/C	II-Pomeroon-Supenaam
Sonia Savitri Parag	PPP/C	PPP/C	V-East Berbice-Corentyne
Suresh Singh	PPP/C	PPP/C	National Top-Up
Susan Margaret Rodrigues	PPP/C	PPP/C	National Top-Up
Tabitha Joy Sarabo-Halley	WIN	WIN	IV-Demerara-Mahaica
Terrence Ilbertis Evrod Campbell	PNCR	APNU	National Top-Up
Toshana Towana Famey-Corlette	WIN	WIN	National Top-Up
Vanessa Indira Sandrina Benn	PPP/C	PPP/C	IV-Demerara-Mahaica
Vickram Outar Bharrat	PPP/C	PPP/C	IX-Upper Takutu-Upper Essequibo
Vikash Ramkissoon	PPP/C	PPP/C	III-Essequibo Islands-West Demerara
Vinceroy Hansel Jordan	PNCR	APNU	V-East Berbice-Corentyne
Vindhya Vasini Persaud	PPP/C	PPP/C	National Top-Up
Vishnu Datt Panday	WIN	WIN	National Top-Up
Vishwa Deva Budhram Mahadeo	PPP/C	PPP/C	VI-East Berbice-Corentyne
Warren Kwame Eusi McCoy	PPP/C	PPP/C	IV-Demerara-Mahaica
Zamal Hussain	PPP/C	PPP/C	National Top-Up
Zulfikar Mustapha	PPP/C	PPP/C	VI-East Berbice-Corentyne
Source: Gazette of Guyana: 16th September, 2025 - Page 15 - Official E-Gazette - Government of the Co-operative Republic of Guyana

== Reactions ==
India and Britain congratulated Ali.
