= List of political parties in Guyana =

This article lists political parties in Guyana. Guyana has a two-party system, which means that there are two dominant political parties. The main divide is not of ideology, but ethnicity; the People's Progressive Party is supported primarily by Indo-Guyanese people, while the People's National Congress is supported primarily by Afro-Guyanese people. Until 2025, these two parties either formed the government or the official opposition.

== The political parties of Guyana ==
=== Parliamentary parties ===
Party	Abbr.	Ideology	MPs
People's Progressive Party/Civic	PPP/C	Social democracy; Left-wing populism	36 / 65
We Invest in Nationhood	WIN	Grassroots politics; Populism	16 / 65
A Partnership for National Unity	APNU	Social democracy; Democratic socialism	12 / 65
Forward Guyana Movement	FGM		1 / 65

=== Non-parliamentary parties ===
Party	Abbr.	Leader	Ideology
Alliance for Change	AFC	Nigel Hughes	Progressivism; Multiracialism
A New and United Guyana	ANUG	Mark France	Consociationalism
Citizenship Initiative	TCI	Rhonda Lam-Singh	Liberalism
Guyana Action Party	GAP	Vincent Henry	Indigenism; Socialism
Justice for All Party	JFAP	Jaipaul Sharma	
Liberty and Justice Party	LJP	Lenox Shuman	Anti-Racial politics
National Democratic Front	NDF		
National Front Alliance		Keith Scott	
National Independent Party			
The New Movement	TNM	Asha Kissoon	
The United Force	TUF; UF	Marissa Nadir	Social conservatism Economic liberalism
United Republican Party	URP	Vishnu Bandhu	
Working People's Alliance	WPA	David Hinds	Democratic socialism Marxism

=== Defunct parties ===
Party	Abbr.	Leader	Ideology
Change Guyana	CG	Robert Badal	Economic liberalism Anti-corruption
People's Republic Party	P.R.P.	Phyllis Jordan	Christian fundamentalism

== See also ==
- Politics of Guyana
- List of political parties by country
