= National Assembly (Guyana) =

Component of the Parliament of Guyana

Coordinates: 06°48′31″N 58°10′00″W

- 13th Parliament of the Co-operative Republic of Guyana

Type
- Type: Unicameral

Leadership
- Prime Minister: Mark Phillips (PPP/C) since 2 August 2020
- Speaker: Manzoor Nadir (PPP/C) since 1 September 2020
- Leader of the Opposition: Azruddin Mohamed (WIN) since 26 January 2026

Structure
- Seats: 65
- Political groups: Government (36): PPP/C (36); Opposition (29): WIN (16); PNCR–APNU (12); FGM (1)

Elections
- Voting system: Closed list proportional representation
- Last election: 1 September 2025
- Next election: 2030

Meeting place
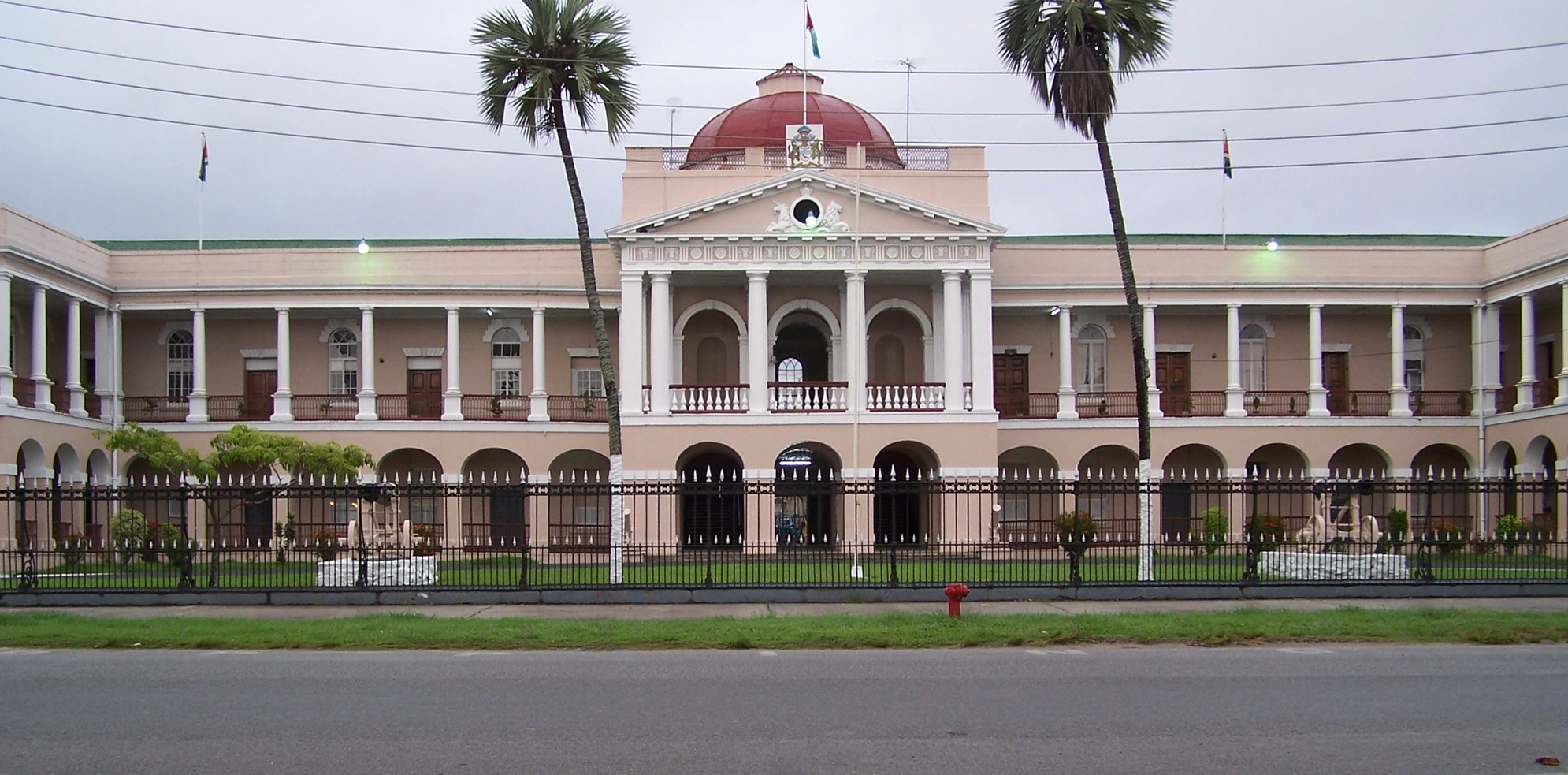
- Parliament Building; Georgetown, Guyana

Website
- National Assembly

The National Assembly is one of the two components of the Parliament of Guyana. Under Article 51 of the Constitution of Guyana, the Parliament of Guyana consists of the president and the National Assembly. The National Assembly has 65 members elected using the system of proportional representation. Twenty five are elected from the ten geographical constituencies and forty are awarded at the national level on the basis of block votes secured, using the LR-Hare Formula as prescribed by the elections Laws (Amendment) Act 15 of 2000 (Sections 11 and 12).

The National Assembly is presided over by the speaker, who may be elected from the members of the National Assembly or from outside the membership. Speakers elected from outside the membership of the National Assembly do not have an original or casting vote. Where a question put before the National Assembly results in the votes by the members being equally divided and the sitting is presided over by a speaker who does not have an original or casting vote, the constitution stipulates that the question does not pass or carry. The members also elect a deputy speaker from among their membership.

== Composition ==
- Speaker
- Clerk of the National Assembly
- Deputy clerk of the National Assembly
- 65 elected and voting members (including members of the governing party appointed as Cabinet ministers)
- Non-elected and non-voting ministers (allowed to the governing party)
- Non-elected and non-voting parliamentary secretaries (appointed by the president)

== Quorum ==
Under Article 169 of the constitution, a minimum of one-third of the elected members (excluding the person presiding) is required to be present for there to be a quorum enabling the sitting of the National Assembly to proceed.

== Meeting place ==
The National Assembly has traditionally met in the Parliament Chambers located within the Public Buildings (often referred to as Parliament Building). The president may, by proclamation, designate any other venue as the meeting place of the National Assembly, for any duration. This was recently done in 2020 when President Irfaan Ali issued a proclamation designating that the National Assembly meet at the Arthur Chung Convention Centre due to the ongoing Covid-19 pandemic, and the limited space in the Parliament Chamber which was not conducive to ensuring proper social distancing.

The predominant colour of the seats and carpet in the Parliament Chamber is green, reflecting the traditional colour of the elected House of Commons in the United Kingdom. This tradition is also replicated in the elected houses of various Commonwealth Caribbean legislatures, including Trinidad and Tobago, Jamaica, and Barbados.

The most prominent feature in the chamber is the ornate ceiling by architect Cesar Castellani.

== Parliamentary term ==
Pursuant to the provisions of Article 70(3) of the constitution, the duration of the parliamentary term shall be for five years from the date the National Assembly, under the new Parliament, first meets after having been dissolved for a general election. The National Assembly is summoned to its first sitting of the parliamentary term by a proclamation by the president which designates the date, time, and venue of the sittings.

The parliamentary term may, however, be longer or shorter depending on the circumstances which require either action. The president may at any time dissolve the National Assembly before the fifth year of its current term to make way for fresh elections. The president must also constitutionally dissolve the National Assembly after a successful no-confidence motion against the government in order for new elections to be held within three months from the date the motion passes.

The constitution also provides that the term of the National Assembly be extended in the event a state of war or emergency exists. However such extensions are limited to twelve months for each instance for a maximum of five instances. The president may also prorogue the National Assembly, however, the constitution provides that each prorogation lasts for a period of six months.

== Legislation ==
Any member of the National Assembly may introduce a bill for the consideration of the assembly. All bills which deal with the finances or financial obligations of the government must receive the permission of the Cabinet, communicated by a minister before it can be introduced into the National Assembly.

The constitution allows the National Assembly to regulate its own procedure, which is done by the Standing Orders of the National Assembly. The Standing Orders were last amended in 2011 after extensive referral to the Special Select Committee on the Report of the Draft Standing Orders over a four-year period.

All bills must receive the assent of the president before they become law. The president may only refuse assent to a bill once and must do so with reasons noted to the speaker of the National Assembly within 21 days of the bill being presented for assent.

Within six months of the bill being returned, the National Assembly may by a vote of two-thirds of the elected members resolve that the bill be presented again to the president for assent. The president shall then give assent to the bill within ninety days of receiving the bill a second time.

Assented bills which have become law are numbered sequentially by year (e.g. Act No. 1 of 2020), sealed with theseal of the Republic of Guyana, and are subsequently published in the Official Gazette of Guyana.

== Latest elections ==
General Elections (parliamentary, presidential, and for the members of the 10 regional democratic councils) were held on 1 September 2025. The next elections are constitutionally due by 2030.

== Current members ==
The current members of the National Assembly for the Thirteenth Parliament are

=== Speaker ===
| Name | Incumbent since |
|---|---|
| Manzoor Nadir | 1 September 2020 |

=== Government members ===
| Name | Party List | Constituency/Notes |
|---|---|---|
| Frank C. S. Anthony | PPP/C | National Top-Up |
| James Anthony Bond | PPP/C | National Top-Up |
| Sarah Brown-Shadeek | PPP/C | National Top-Up |
| Alister Charlie | PPP/C | National Top-Up |
| Sanjeev Datadin | PPP/C | National Top-Up |
| Juan A. Edghill | PPP/C | National Top-Up |
| Zamal Hussain | PPP/C | National Top-Up |
| Deodat Indar | PPP/C | National Top-Up |
| Bharrat Jagdeo | PPP/C | National Top-Up |
| Seepaul Narine | PPP/C | National Top-Up |
| Anand Persaud | PPP/C | National Top-Up |
| Vindhya Persaud | PPP/C | National Top-Up |
| Mark Phillips | PPP/C | National Top-Up |
| Charles S. Ramson | PPP/C | National Top-Up |
| Peter Ramsaroop | PPP/C | National Top-Up |
| Susan Rodrigues | PPP/C | National Top-Up |
| Ashni Kumar Singh | PPP/C | National Top-Up |
| Suresh Singh | PPP/C | National Top-Up |
| Lenox Shuman | PPP/C | National Top-Up |
| Hugh Todd | PPP/C | National Top-Up |
| Bhagmattie Veerasammy | PPP/C | National Top-Up |
| Oneidge Walrond | PPP/C | National Top-Up |
| Jennifer Westford | PPP/C | National Top-Up |
| Collin Croal | PPP/C | Region 1 |
| Sonia Latchman | PPP/C | Region 2 |
| Priya Manickchand | PPP/C | Region 3 |
| Vickash Ramkissoon | PPP/C | Region 3 |
| Warren Kwame McCoy | PPP/C | Region 4 |
| Mohabir Anil Nandlall | PPP/C | Region 4 |
| Vanessa Benn | PPP/C | Region 4 |
| Savitri Sonia Parag | PPP/C | Region 5 |
| Vishwa Mahadeo | PPP/C | Region 6 (Deputy Speaker) |
| Zukfikar Mustapha | PPP/C | Region 6 |
| Gail Teixeira | PPP/C | Region 7 |
| Pauline Sukhai | PPP/C | Region 8 |
| Vickram Bharrat | PPP/C | Region 9 |

=== Opposition members ===
| Name | Party List | Constituency/Notes |
|---|---|---|
| Duarte Hetsberger | WIN | National Top-Up |
| Andre Lewis | WIN | National Top-Up |
| Azruddin Mohamed | WIN | National Top-Up |
| Vishnu Panday | WIN | National Top-Up |
| Odessa Primus | WIN | National Top-Up |
| Toshana Towana Famey-Corlette | WIN | National Top-Up |
| Nandranie Singh | WIN | National Top-Up |
| Natasha Singh-Lewis | WIN | National Top-Up |
| Deon La Cruz | WIN | Region 1 |
| Beverley Anna Cornelius | WIN | Region 2 |
| Gordon Barker | WIN | Region 3 |
| Tabitha Sarabo-Halley | WIN | Region 4 |
| Janelle Sweatnam | WIN | Region 4 |
| Gobin Harbhajan | WIN | Region 6 |
| Dawn Hastings-Williams | WIN | Region 7 |
| Ryan Richards | WIN | Region 10 |
| Saiku Andrews | APNU | National Top-Up |
| Terrence Campbell | APNU | National Top-Up |
| Juretha Fernandes | APNU | National Top-Up |
| David Hinds | APNU | National Top-Up |
| Ganesh Mahipaul | APNU | National Top-Up |
| Coretta McDonald | APNU | National Top-Up |
| Riaz Rupnarain | APNU | National Top-Up |
| Dexter Todd | APNU | National Top-Up |
| Sherod Duncan | APNU | Region 4 |
| Nima Flu-Bess | APNU | Region 4 |
| Vinceroy Jordan | APNU | Region 5 |
| Kuice Sharma Solomon | APNU | Region 10 |
| Amanza Walton-Desir | FGM | National Top-Up |

== See also ==
- Politics of Guyana
- List of legislatures by country
- List of speakers of the National Assembly of Guyana
- Leader of the Opposition of Guyana

== Bibliography ==
- Constitution (2012). "CONSTITUTION OF THE CO-OPERATIVE REPUBLIC OF GUYANA ACT" (PDF). Parliament of Guyana.
