= 2023 Guyanese local elections =

- June 12th 2023

All 80 Local Authority Areas Electoral Areas
- Opinion polls
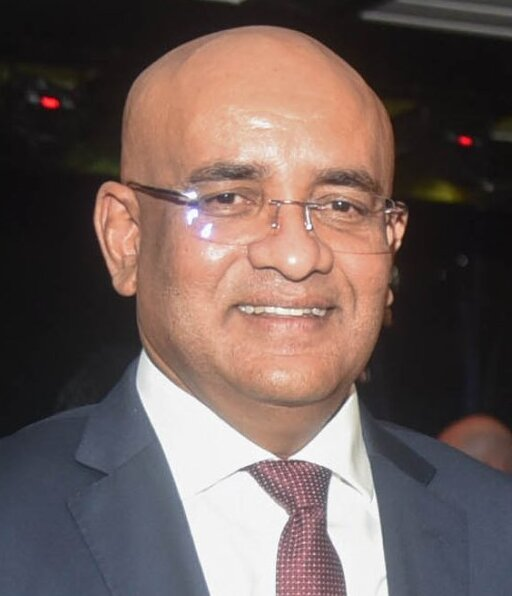

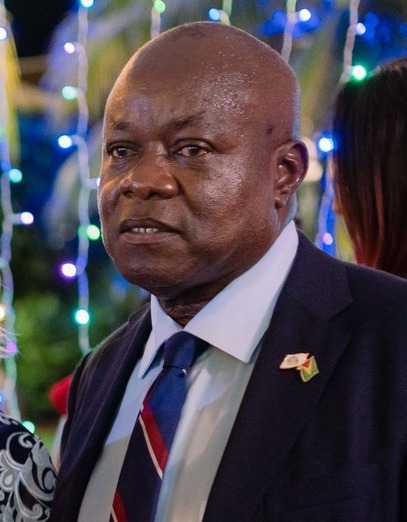
| Leader | Bharrat Jagdeo | Aubrey Norton |
| Party | PPP/C | APNU |
| Leader since | 7 January 2017 | 18 December 2021 |
| Last election | 122,307 votes, 60.5% 52 Local Authority Areas | 68,060 votes, 33.7% 23 Local Authority Areas |

The 2023 Guyanese local elections, officially due since 2020, were held on Monday, June 12, 2023, following the latest delay of the officially biennial polls by three years due to lawsuits and vacancies at the Guyana Elections Commission (GECOM) following the fallout and misconduct of the 2020 Guyanese general election and the COVID-19 pandemic. All 1,220 council seats within 610 constituencies across Guyana's 80 local authority areas (LAAs), comprising 70 neighbourhood democratic councils (NDCs) and 10 municipalities are being contested. GECOM stated that voting is not required in 291 constituencies in which the ruling People's Progressive Party/Civic (PPP/C) has won by acclamation due to no other candidates running against them. As a result the PPP/C retained control and won all seats in LAAs such as the NDCs of Leguan, La Jalousie/Nouvelle Flanders, Canals Polder, Little Diamond/Herstelling, Ordnance Fort Lands/ No. 38, Kintyre/No. 37 or Borlam, Kilcoy/Hampshire, Port Mourant/John, Bloomfield/Whim, No. 64/No. 74, the municipality of Lethem and gained control of the Aranaputa/ Upper Burro Burro NDC. The PPP/C is hoping to win over A Partnership for National Unity (APNU)/People's National Congress Reform (PNCR)opposition strongholds, campaigning heavily in Guyana's capital city, Georgetown, which has remained in APNU/PNCR control since independence from the United Kingdom in 1966. Efforts by the PNCR to postpone or cancel the elections via litigation regarding the electoral roll and local government constituency boundaries, were dismissed by Guyana's High Court in the lead-up to these elections, claiming that, these issues are behind its no-contest of 291 constituencies across the 80 LAAs. The opposition Alliance for Change (AFC), the junior coalition partner of the APNU, has boycotted the 2023 local elections over similar concerns.

For the last election in 2018, there were 1192 council seats in 596 constituencies, across Guyana's 80 local authority areas, comprising 70 neighbourhood democratic council (NDCs) and 10 municipalities.

== Number of votes cast and seats held prior to the election ==
The major political parties are defending the following numbers of electoral districts from local authority areas on election day:

- A Partnership for National Unity (APNU) – 68,060 votes (33.7%), 188 Proportional Representation seats (31.5%), 23 local authority areas
- People's Progressive Party/Civic (PPP/C) – 122,307 votes (60.5%), 386 Proportional Representation seats (64.8%), 52 local authority areas
- Alliance for Change (AFC) – 8,719 votes (4.18%), 14 Proportional Representation seats (31.5%), 0 local authority areas
- Four different voluntary groups – 2,995 votes (1.44%), 8 Proportional Representation seats (1.34%), 0 local authority areas

These numbers are how many votes and seats each party had won at the previous election, in 2018, rather than which party held the seat on the eve of the election.

== Eligibility to vote ==
All registered electors (Guyanese, Commonwealth and Non-Commonwealth citizens) who are aged 18 or over, reside legally in Guyana and have resided in an electoral district/constituency for a least two months prior to the election date are entitled to vote in the local elections.

== Parties, alliances and standings ==
Political parties registered with the Guyana Elections Commission (GECOM) can contest the local elections.

| Party/Alliance | Founded | Ideology | Leader(s) | Leader since | Last election | | | Notes |
| Party/Alliance | Founded | Ideology | Leader(s) | Leader since | % party vote | Local authority areas | Constituencies | Notes |
|---|---|---|---|---|---|---|---|---|
| APNU | 2011 | Centre-left to left-wing | Aubrey Norton | 18 December 2021 | 54.59% | 23 / 80 (29%) | 188 / 596 (32%) | |
| PPP/C | 1950 | Centre-left to left-wing | Bharrat Jagdeo | 7 January 2017 | 60.5% | 52 / 80 (65%) | 386 / 596 (65%) | |

== Campaign slogans ==
| Party | Slogan |
|---|---|
| A Partnership for National Unity | Stronger Together; Ready to lead Experience Matters |
| People's Progressive Party/Civic | Georgetown: A New Beginning for Georgetown Choose the PPP/C; Let Us Do It Right |

== Opinion polls ==
The North American Caribbean Teachers Association (NACTA) who commissions opinion polling for elections in the region, sampling the electorates' opinions, has been criticized for not being quantitative and instead being qualitative by containing no statistical figures whatsoever and also for not publishing its methodology, with missing information such as sample size, how the sample is chosen and margin of erro. The pollster has also been criticised for being outdated by not having a website where the full surveys can be accessible.

=== Local authority area projections ===
| Date | Pollster | Sample size | APNU | PPP/C | NOC |
|---|---|---|---|---|---|
| 21 May 2023 | | 2023 Mahdia school fire kills 19 children | | | |
| 3 January 2023 | NACTA | 500 | Qualitative NACTA poll (no statistics/fieldwork) stating that the PPP/C will achieve a "sweeping victory" in the 2023 Guyanese local elections | | |
| 2 March 2020 | | PPP/C wins the 2020 Guyanese general election | | | |
| 12 November 2018 | Local Election results | – | 23 | 52 | 5 |

== Summary results ==
Elections are conducted under both a proportional representation and first-past-the-post list system.

| Party/Alliance | Party/Alliance leader | Candidates | Local authority areas | | | % of | | | Constituencies | | | % of constituencies | | | Votes | | | % of votes | | |
| Party/Alliance | Party/Alliance leader | Candidates | 2018 | 2023 | +/- | 2018 | 2023 | +/- | 2018 | 2023 | +/- | 2018 | 2023 | +/- | 2018 | 2023 | +/- | 2019 | 2023 | +/- |
|---|---|---|---|---|---|---|---|---|---|---|---|---|---|---|---|---|---|---|---|---|
| APNU | Aubrey Norton | 279 | 23 | 14 | ▼9 | 28.8% | 17.5% | ▼11.3% | 188 | | | 31.5% | | | 68,060 | | | 33.7% | | |
| PPP/C | Bharrat Jagdeo | 610 | 52 | 62 | ▲10 | 65.0% | 77.5% | ▲12.5% | 386 | | | 64.8% | | | 122,307 | | | 60.5% | | |
| No overall control | N/A | | 5 | 4 | ▼1 | 6.3% | 5.0% | ▼1.3% | 22 | | | 3.7% | | | 18,167 | | | 5.8% | | |
| Total | | | 80 | 80 | Steady | 100% | 100% | Steady | 596 | 610 | ▲ | 100% | 100% | Steady | 208,534 | | | 100% | 100% | Steady |
Electorate: 629,033 Total votes: Turnout: %

== Results by local authority areas ==
| Region | Local authority areas | | Prior to election | | | | | | | Post election | | | | |
| Region | No. | Name | Seats | Control | APNU | AFC | PPP/C | Other | Unknown result of constituency seats | Seats | Control | APNU | PPP/C | Other |
|---|---|---|---|---|---|---|---|---|---|---|---|---|---|---|
| 1 | 1 | Port Kaituma/Matthews Ridge/Arakaka | 12 | PPP/C | 4 | 1 | 7 | - | | 12 | PPP/C | 12 | 0 | |
| 1 | 2 | Municipality of Mabaruma | 12 | PPP/C | 4 | 0 | 8 | - | | 14 | PPP/C | 2 | 12 | |
| 2 | 3 | Moruka/Providence | 6 | NOC | 3 | - | 3 | - | | 6 | | | | |
| 2 | 4 | Nile/Cozier | 6 | PPP/C | 2 | - | 4 | - | | 6 | | | | |
| 2 | 5 | Charity/Urasara | 18 | PPP/C | 1 | - | 16 | 1 (United Destiny Group - UDG) | | 18 | | | | |
| 2 | 6 | Evergreen/Paradise | 8 | NOC | 4 | - | 4 | 0 | | 18 | | | | |
| 2 | 7 | Municipality of Anna Regina | 16 | PPP/C | 1 | - | 15 | 0 | | 16 | PPP/C | 1 | 15 | |
| 2 | 8 | Aberdeen/Zorg-en-Vlygt | 16 | PPP/C | 6 | - | 10 | - | | 18 | | | | |
| 2 | 9 | Annandale/Riverstown | 18 | PPP/C | 1 | - | 17 | - | | 18 | | | | |
| 2 | 10 | Good Hope/Pomona | 18 | PPP/C | 2 | - | 16 | 0 | | 18 | | | | |
| 3 | 11 | Leguan | 18 | PPP/C | 1 | - | 17 | - | | 18 | PPP/C | - | 18 | - |
| 3 | 12 | Wakenaam | 18 | PPP/C | 3 | - | 15 | - | | 18 | | | | |
| 3 | 13 | Mora/Parika | 16 | PPP/C | 4 | 0 | 12 | 0 (URP) | | 16 | | | | |
| 3 | 14 | Hydronie/Good Hope | 14 | PPP/C | 5 | - | 9 | 0 (URP) | | 14 | | | | |
| 3 | 15 | Greenwich Park/Vergenogen | 16 | PPP/C | 3 | - | 13 | 0 (URP) | | 16 | | | | |
| 3 | 16 | Tuschen/Uitvlugt | 20 | PPP/C | 1* | 0 | 9* | | 10 | 20 | | | | |
| 3 | 17 | Stewartville/Cornelia Ida | 20 | PPP/C | 1 | 0 | 19 | 0 (URP) | | 20 | | | | |
| 3 | 18 | Hague/Blankenburg | 18 | APNU | 11 (Includes tie in Constituency No. 2: Hague– South of the Public Road) | - | 7 | 0 (URP) | | 18 | PPP/C | | | |
| 3 | 19 | La Jalousie/Nouvelle Flanders | 18 | PPP/C | - | 0 | 18 | 0 (URP) | | 18 | PPP/C | - | 18 | - |
| 3 | 20 | The Best/Klien Pouderoyen | 20 | PPP/C | 8 | 0 | 12 | 0 (URP, IGFLD) | | 20 | | | | |
| 3 | 21 | Malgre Tout/Meer-Zorgen | 14 | APNU | 8 | - | 6 | 0 (URP) | | 16 | | | | |
| 3 | 22 | La Grange/Nismes | 14 | PPP/C | 6 | 0 | 8 | 0 (URP) | | 18 | | | | |
| 3 | 23 | Canals Polder | 18 | PPP/C | 2 | - | 16 | 0 (URP) | | 18 | PPP/C | - | 18 | - |
| 3 | 24 | Toevlugt/Free & Easy | 16 | PPP/C | 7 | - | 9 | 0 (URP) | | 18 | | | | |
| 4 | 25 | Hauraruni/Yarowkabra | 8 | PPP/C | 5 | 1 | 2 | - | | 6 | | | | |
| 4 | 26 | Lamaha/Yarowkabra | 8 | NOC | 4 | 0 | 4 | 0 (PDM) | | 10 | | | | |
| 4 | 27 | Soesdyke/Huist Coverden | 18 | Unknown | 4* | - | 5* | 0 (TBEG) | 9 | 18 | PPP/C | 6 | 12 | |
| 4 | 28 | Caledonia/Good Success | 14 | PPP/C | - | - | 6 | 1 (CCD) | | 18 | | | | |
| 4 | 29 | Golden Grove/Diamond Place | 18 | PPP/C | 4 | 0 | 14 | 0 (PVM) | | 18 | | | | |
| 4 | 30 | Mocha/Arcadia | 12 | APNU | 11 | 1 | 0 | - | | 12 | | | | |
| 4 | 31 | Little Diamond/Herstelling | 18 | PPP/C | 2 | - | 16 | - | | 18 | PPP/C | - | 18 | - |
| 4 | 32 | Eccles/Ramsburg | 18 | PPP/C | 5 | - | 13 | 0 (PTTSOE) | | 18 | | | | |
| 4 | 33 | Municipality of Georgetown | 30 | APNU | 21 | 2 | 7 | 0 (GNSP, URP) | | 30 | APNU | 19 | 11 | 0 (ICP, MUD, AGNSP) |
| 4 | 34 | Industry/Plaisance | 18 | APNU | 5* | - | 4* | - | 9 | 18 | NOC | 9 | 9 | |
| 4 | 35 | Better Hope/La Bonne Intention | 18 | PPP/C | 3 | - | 15 | - | | 18 | | | | |
| 4 | 36 | Beterverwagting/Triumph | 18 | Unknown | 4* | - | 3* | 2* (BV/Triumph 8 May Movement) | 9 | 18 | | | | |
| 4 | 37 | Mon Repos/La Reconnaissance | 18 | PPP/C | 2 | - | 16 | - | | 18 | | | | |
| 4 | 38 | Buxton/Foulis | 18 | PPP/C | 8 | 0 | 10 | - | | 18 | APNU | 10 | 8 | |
| 4 | 39 | Enmore/Hope | 18 | PPP/C | 1* | - | 8* | - | 9 | 18 | | | | |
| 4 | 40 | Haslington/Grove | 18 | APNU | 11 | 1 | 6 | 0 (URP, AFT) | | 18 | | | | |
| 4 | 41 | Unity/Vereeniging | 18 | Unknown | 3* | 0 | 6* | - | 9 | 18 | | | | |
| 4 | 42 | Cane Grove | 12 | Unknown | 1* | - | 5* | - | 6 | 12 | PPP/C | 0 | 12 | - |
| 5 | 43 | Joe Hook No.10/Farm | 14 | PPP/C | 7 | 1 | 6 | - | | 16 | | | | |
| 5 | 44 | Hamlet/Chance | 6 | APNU | 6 | - | 0 | - | | 6 | | | | |
| 5 | 45 | Mahaicony/Abary | 16 | PPP/C | 6 | - | 10 | - | | 18 | | | | |
| 5 | 46 | Profit/Rising Sun | 12 | APNU | 6 | 0 | 2 | 4 (PFA, UCD, DCR, USCD) | | 12 | | | | |
| 5 | 47 | Seafield/Tempe | 16 | APNU | 11 | - | 5 | - | | 16 | | | | |
| 5 | 48 | Union/Naarstigheid | 18 | APNU | 11 | 1 | 6 | - | | 18 | | | | |
| 5 | 49 | Bath/Woodley Park | 18 | PPP/C | 18 | - | 0 | - | | 18 | | | | |
| 5 | 50 | Woodlands/Bel Air | 8 | NOC | 4 | - | 4 | - | | 8 | | | | |
| 5 | 51 | Zeelust/Rosignol | 16 | PPP/C | 3 | - | 13 | | | 18 | | | | |
| 5 | 52 | Blairmont/Gelderland | 14 | PPP/C | 3 | 0 | 11 | - | | 18 | | | | |
| 6 | 53 | Plegtanker/Koortbradt | 8 | APNU | 5 | | 3 | | | 8 | | | | |
| 6 | 54 | Wyburg/Caracas | 6 | PPP/C | 2 | | 4 | | | 6 | | | | |
| 6 | 55 | Enfield/ New Doe Park | 16 | PPP/C | 5 | | 11 | | | 16 | | | | |
| 6 | 56 | Municipality of New Amsterdam | 14 | APNU | 10 | 1 | 3 | | | 14 | APNU | 8 | 6 | |
| 6 | 57 | Cane Field/Enterprise | 16 | PPP/C | 1 | | 15 | | | 16 | | | | |
| 6 | 58 | Ordnance Fort Lands/ No. 38 | 14 | PPP/C | 2 | | 12 | | | 16 | PPP/C | - | 16 | - |
| 6 | 59 | Kintyre/No. 37 or Borlam | 14 | PPP/C | 0 | | 16 | | | 16 | PPP/C | - | 16 | - |
| 6 | 60 | Gibraltar/Fyrish | 18 | APNU | 10 | | 8 | | | 18 | | | | |
| 6 | 61 | Kilcoy/Hampshire | 14 | PPP/C | 0 | | 14 | | | 16 | PPP/C | - | 16 | - |
| 6 | 62 | Port Mourant/John | 14 | PPP/C | 0 | | 13 | 1 | | 18 | PPP/C | - | 18 | - |
| 6 | 63 | Municipality of Rose Hall | 16 | PPP/C | 5 | | 11 | | | 14 | PPP/C | 3 | 11 | |
| 6 | 64 | Bloomfield/Whim | 14 | PPP/C | 1 | | 13 | | | 14 | PPP/C | - | 14 | - |
| 6 | 65 | Lancaster/Hogstye | 14 | APNU | 12 | | 2 | | | 14 | | | | |
| 6 | 66 | Adventure/ No. 28 or Bushlot | 12 | NOC | 6 | - | 6 | - | | 14 | | | | |
| 6 | 67 | Maida/Tarlogie | 10 | PPP/C | 2 | | 8 | | | 12 | | | | |
| 6 | 68 | Macedonia/Joppa | 12 | APNU | 7 | | 5 | | | 12 | | | | |
| 6 | 69 | Black Bush Polder | 18 | PPP/C | 1 | | 17 | | | 18 | | | | |
| 6 | 70 | Good Hope/No. 51 | 14 | PPP/C | 5 | | 9 | | | 14 | | | | |
| 6 | 71 | No. 52/No. 63 | 18 | PPP/C | 1 | | 17 | | | 8 | | | | |
| 6 | 72 | No. 64/No. 74 | 18 | PPP/C | 1 | | 17 | | | 10 | PPP/C | - | 10 | - |
| 6 | 73 | Crabwood Creek/Molesen | 14 | PPP/C | 0 | | 14 | | | 14 | | | | |
| 6 | 74 | Municipality of Corriverton | 16 | PPP/C | 2 | | 14 | | | 16 | PPP/C | 3 | 13 | |
| 7 | 75 | Municipality of Bartica | 18 | APNU | 13 | 1 | 4 | - | | 18 | NOC | 9 | 9 | |
| 8 | 76 | Municipality of Mahdia | 8 | APNU | 5 | 2 | 1 | | | 8 | NOC | 4 | 4 | |
| 9 | 77 | Municipality of Lethem | 10 | PPP/C | 4 | | 6 | | | 10 | PPP/C | - | 10 | - |
| 9 | 78 | Aranaputa/ Upper Burro Burro | 6 | APNU | 5 | | 1 | | | 6 | PPP/C | - | 6 | - |
| 10 | 79 | Municipality of Linden | 16 | APNU | 13 | 2 | 1 | | | 16 | APNU | 14 | 2 | |
| 10 | 80 | Kwakwani | 12 | APNU+AFC | 4 | 3 (AFC wins subsequent tie-breaking by-election in Constituency No. 4) | 2 | 3 (KUFP) | | 12 | APNU | 7 | 5 | |
| All 10 regions | All 80 local authority areas | | 1192 | | | 17 | | | | 1220 | | | | |
| Source: PPP/C wins 65% of PR seats at local gov't polls, LGE 2018: PPP takes 188 seats out of 261 in Region 6 in landslide victory, | | | | | | | | | | | | | | |

== See also ==
- 2020 Guyanese general election
- 2020 Guyanese protests
- 2023 Trinidadian local elections
