= Susan Rodriguez =

Susan Rodriguez may refer to:

- Susan C. Rodriguez, United States district judge
- The Dresden Files characters#Susan Rodriguez, character in The Dresden Files novel series
- Sue Rodriguez (1950–1994), Canadian right-to-die activist
- Susan Rodrigues, (born 1987), Guyanese politician

== See also ==
- Susana Rodríguez (disambiguation)
