= Maureen Allison Philadelphia =

Guyanese politician

Maureen Allison Philadelphia is a Guyanese politician from the People's National Congress Reform. In the 2020 general election, she was elected to the National Assembly representing the IV-Mahaica-Berbice district.
