= National Republican Party (Guyana) =

Former political party in Guyana

The National Republican Party (NRP) was a right-wing political party in Guyana.

== History ==
The party was established in 1990 following a split in the United Republican Party. In the 1992 general elections it received just 114 votes and failed to win a seat. The party did not contest any further elections, and merged into the National Front Alliance on 1 December 2000.
