= Fenton Ramsahoye =

Guyanese lawyer and politician (1929–2018)

Sir Fenton Ramsahoye

Attorney General of Guyana
- In office 1961–1964
- Succeeded by: Forbes Burnham

Personal details
- Born: Fenton Ramsahoye; 20 May 1929 British Guiana
- Died: 27 December 2018 (aged 89) Barbados

Sir Fenton Ramsahoye, QC, SC (20 May 1929 – 27 December 2018) was a Guyanese lawyer and politician who served for over twenty years in Antigua and Barbuda.

== Education ==
Ramsahoye studied at London University where he was awarded B.A. in 1949 and LL.B., LLM in 1953 and 1956. He was called to the bar at Lincoln's Inn on 10 February 1953 and was awarded Ph.D. in Comparative Land Law from London School of Economics and Political Science in 1959.

== Career ==
Ramsahoye was at the forefront of the independence movement. In 1961 he was elected a Member of Parliament of Guyana and remained in parliament until 1973. He was Attorney General of British Guiana from 1961 to 1964 and a member of Board of Governors of University of Guyana from 1962 to 1964. In 2006, he held the record for making the most appearances before the Judicial Committee of the Privy Council in the Caribbean. Ramsahoye was appointed Senior Counsel in Guyana in 1971. From 1972 to 1975 he was Deputy Director of Legal Education for the Council of Legal Education in the West Indies and head of Hugh Wooding Law School as a professor.

Ramsahoye was a Queen's Counsel and a member of the bars of England and Wales, Guyana, Trinidad and Tobago, Barbados, Jamaica, the Territories of the Eastern Caribbean including Montserrat, and the British Virgin Islands. He was knighted in 2006 by Governor General Sir James Carlisle during a ceremony at Government House in Antigua.

== Personal life ==
Ramsahoye married Phyllis Gwendolyn Lutz, the daughter of Richard Benjamin Lutz of South Australia.

He died in Barbados on 27 December 2018 at the age of 89.

== Publications ==
- The Development of Land Law in British Guiana Oceana Publications, New York, (1966)
