= A New and United Guyana =

- Abbreviation: ANUG
- Chairperson: Dr. Mark France
- General Secretary: Timothy Jonas
- Founded: January 2019
- Ideology: Consociationalism
- National Assembly: 1 / 65

A New and United Guyana (ANUG) is a political party in Guyana.

== History ==
The party was founded in January 2019, with its main goal being shared governance, along with reducing poverty, consensus on governing the oil industry and climate change as major areas of focus. Key individuals at the launch included Ralph Ramkarran, Beni Sankar, Kian Jabour, Henry Jeffrey, Akanni Blair and Timothy Jonas.

It ran in the 2020 general elections with Ralph Ramkarran as its presidential candidate. The party received 2,313 votes and gained a shared seat in parliament through an alliance with the New Movement and the Liberty and Justice Party.

=== 2021 ===
On 13 July 2021, ANUG held its second internal elections with Timothy Jonas elected chairman, Ralph Ramkarran elected general secretary, Althia King elected assistant general secretary and Kian Jabour elected organizing secretary, along with new faces bringing new ideas and a fresh look to the party.

The 10 elected committee members are Alex D’Aguiar, Stephen Patterson, Dr. Mark France, Celina Kishna, Bruce Camacho, Mary Correia, Niall Stanton, Javeed Ally, Bhavita Sukh and Dirk Walker.

=== 2022 ===
On 19 November 2022, ANUG held its third internal elections with Dr. Mark France elected Chairman, Timothy Jonas elected General Secretary, Stephen Patterson elected Assistant General Secretary, and Kian Jabour re-elected as organizing secretary.

The 10 elected committee members were; Javeed Ally, Joel Ramesh, Kurt Anderson, Mary Ann Coreia, Dr. Alex D'Aguiar, Althia king, Nadia Sagar, Mohamed Esa Shaheed, Laura Singh and Niall Stanton.

=== 2025 ===
ANUG fought the 2025 general election under a joinder agreement with the newly formed We Invest in Nationhood (WIN) party. The alliance placed second in the 1 September election, winning 16 seats in the National Assembly.
