= Bheri Ramsaran =

Guyanese politician (born 1959)

Bheri Sygmond Ramsaran
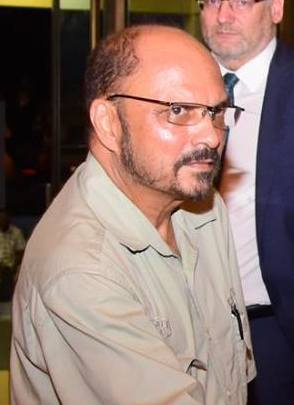

Minister of Health of Guyana
- In office 2011–2015

Personal details
- Born: 16 March 1959 (age 67)
- Education: Patrice Lumumba University

Bheri Sygmond Ramsaran (born 16 March 1959) is a Guyanese politician and doctor. Minister of Health of Guyana in 2011–2015.

== Biography ==
Bheri Sygmond Ramsaran was born on March 16, 1959. He graduated from the Medical faculty of Peoples' Friendship University in 1987, and went to work at Georgetown Hospital. The following year, he moved to New Amsterdam Hospital. He also worked in Skeldon and Port Morant hospitals as a surgeon. In 1996, he was appointed as the Director of the Department of Regional Health under the Ministry of Health of Guyana.

In 1977, he joined the People's Progressive Party of Guyana. He was a member of the Central and Executive Committees of the party and was the party secretary for public education. In 1998, he was elected member of the National Assembly of Guyana.

In 2011, he was appointed Minister of Health of Guyana. In 2015, he was dismissed from his post by President Donald Ramotar after a scandal where he publicly insulted LGBT activist Sherlin Nagir. Because of this incident, Ramsaran was charged.

He is single and has no children.
