= Charles S. Ramson =

Guyanese politician

The Honourable Charles Ramson MP
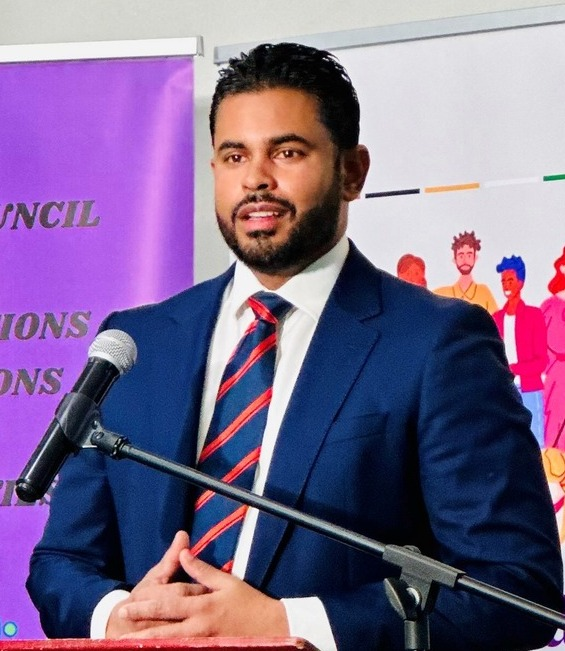
- Ramson in 2022

Minister for Culture, Youth and Sport
- Incumbent
- Assumed office 5 August 2020

Member of Parliament
- Incumbent
- Assumed office 3 September 2020

Charles S. Ramson Jr. is a Guyanese politician and lawyer, who serves as a Member of Parliament and Minister of Culture, Youth and Sport in the government led by President Irfaan Ali.

Ramson is a member of the People's Progressive Party.
