= Amanza Walton Desir =

Guyanese politician

Amanza Walton Desir MP
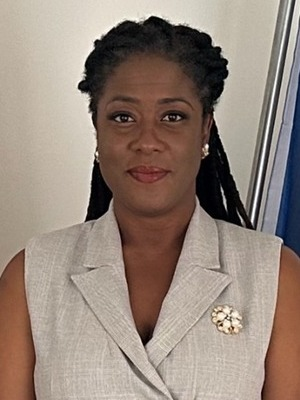
- Walton-Desir in 2025

Shadow Minister of Foreign Affairs and International Cooperation
- In office 1 September 2020 – 18 June 2025
- Leader: Aubrey Norton

Member of the National Assembly
- In office 1 September 2020 – 18 June 2025

Personal details
- Born: Amanza Owana Rukia Walton; 6 December 1979 (age 46) East Berbice-Corentyne, Guyana
- Citizenship: Guyanese
- Party: Forward Guyana (since 2025); People's National Congress Reform (until 2025)
- Children: 2
- Education: MacKenzie High School; President's College; University of Guyana (LLB); International Maritime Law Institute (LLM)
- Occupation: Politician; Lawyer
- Walton Desir's voice recorded 2023 at Toastmasters International

Amanza Walton-Desir (born 6 December 1979) is a Guyanese politician and leader of Forward Guyana.

With over two decades of experience in public service, Walton-Desir is also a Member of the National Assembly, and served as Shadow Minister of Foreign Affairs and International Cooperation of Guyana, until her June 2025 resignation from the People's National Congress Reform (PNCR), where she was a member of the central executive.

== Early life and career ==
Walton-Desir was born in East Berbice-Corentyne to Ovid Walton, an officer in the Guyana Defence Force (GDF) and Joy Walton, a schoolteacher. Both parents were heavily involved in local politics, with the People's National Congress Reform, until their deaths.

In her early education, Walton-Desir graduated from MacKenzie High School in 1995, and completed her A-level at President's College in 1997. She then attended University of Guyana, graduating with a Bachelor of Laws degree with Honours, and was admitted to the Guyana Bar in 2003.

From 2005 to 2010, Walton-Desir served as a Special Assistant to the Prime Minister of Guyana. In 2010, she was appointed Legal Advisor to the Ministry of Public Works. There, she provided legal advice to the Ministry of Public Works, the Guyana Civil Aviation Authority (GCAA), the Maritime Administration Department and the Cheddi Jagan International Airport. From 2013 to 2020, she held the position of General Counsel of the Guyana Civil Aviation Authority (GCAA).

== Guyana National Assembly ==
On 1 September 2020, Walton became a member of parliament in the National Assembly. She served as Shadow Minister of Foreign Affairs and International Cooperation of Guyana until June, 2025.
