= William Arrindell =

British judge

Sir William Arrindell

Attorney General of British Guiana
- In office 1845–1852

Personal details
- Born: 12 October 1796 Tortola, Virgin Islands
- Died: 27 December 1862 (aged 66) Demerara, British Guiana

Sir William Arrindell CB (12 October 1796 – 27 December 1862) was a British judge.

Born in Tortola, the Virgin Islands, he was educated in England. Arrindell worked as barrister in Georgetown and in 1824, he defended John Smith in his trial. Arrindell became Attorney-General of British Guiana in 1845 and was subsequently appointed Chief Justice of British Guiana in 1852. He was created a Knight Bachelor in 1858 and was made a Companion of the Order of the Bath in the same year.

He died at Demerara, aged 66, from the consequences of a fall from a staircase. His funeral procession stretched for half a mile and was the greatest British Guiana had seen so far.

Legal offices
Preceded by William Furlonge	Attorney-General of British Guiana; 1845 – 1852	Succeeded by Robert Rutledge Craig
Preceded by Jeffery Hart Bent	Chief Justice of British Guiana; 1852 – 1862	Succeeded by Joseph Beaumont
