= Ronald Gajraj =

Guyanese politician (1952–2018)

Minister of Home Affairs, Guyana
- In office January 1999 – May 2005

High Commissioner to India, Guyana
- In office 2005–2015

High Commissioner to Bangladesh, Guyana
- In office 2015–2015

Personal details
- Born: April 1952
- Died: December 2018 (aged 66)
- Party: People's Progressive Party (Guyana)

Ronald Gajraj (April 1952 – December 2018) was a Guyanese lawyer and politician and who served as the Minister of Home Affairs. He was a member of the People's Progressive Party.

== Biography ==
Gajraj was a Lieutenant in the Guyana Defence Force, Lawyer, and later the Minister of Home Affairs, and the High Commissioner to India and Bangladesh.

Gajraj was appointed Minister of Home Affairs by Janet Jagan, in January 1999, and served until May 2005.

In 2002, they were rumours of a death squad operating extra-judicially that was allegedly responsible for the execution of numerous men who were wanted by local police for crimes against the state. In October 2003, George Bacchus, a self proclaimed member of the death squad, accused Gajraj of providing support to the alleged 'death squad'.

Bacchus was found murdered in his home on June 24, 2004, drawing speculation that the execution was carried out by the alleged death squad. However, twenty - three (23) year old Delon Reynolds, A.K.A 'Fatboy' plead guilty for manslaughter and was convicted and sentenced to ten (10) years imprisonment, claiming that a funeral parlour owner paid him to carry out the murder because of a personal problem she had with Bacchus. Nonetheless Gajraj stepped down as Home Affairs Minister, requesting a commission of inquiry, saying "I would like to take this opportunity to state categorically that the statement by His Excellency must not be seen as an about-face. It must be noted that the political opposition has been calling for my removal, thus aborting the course of natural justice. They tried me, convicted me and sentenced me before any investigation. I do not intend to resign on the basis of unfounded and scandalous allegations in sections of the media. I will not be lynched....I call on sections of the media and their political handlers to stop hounding and vilifying my family and me. Let us all await the findings of the Inquiry, which I expect will be made public.".

The Commission of Inquiry was chaired by Justice of Appeal Ian Chang, and also included former Chief of Staff of the Guyana Defence Force, Major General (ret'd) Norman McLean and Deputy Commissioner of Police (ret'd) and Chairman of the Police Service Commission, Mr. Ivan Crandon. According to the Terms of Reference, they were to examine, advise and report on whether and to what extent there was evidence of a credible nature to support the allegations that Gajraj had been involved in promoting, directing or otherwise engaged in activities which have involved the extra-judicial killing of persons. The commission cleared Gajraj of any involvement into the 'alleged' death squad or extra-judicial murders, and he was reinstated as Minister, subsequently resigning under international pressure.

In 2005, he was appointed Guyana's High Commissioner to India, and subsequently Bangladesh in 2015, he was also appointed Guyana's High Commissioner to Bangladesh. He served in both roles until after the 2015 Guyanese general election.

Ronald Gajraj died on 15 December 2018 following a short illness. The People's Progressive Party Civic (PPP/C), Gajraj's political party, paid tribute to the late politician noting that "Gajraj would best be remembered for the pivotal role he had played as Home Affairs Minister in the fight against crime at a very challenging time in this nation’s history.".
