= Attorney General of Guyana =

Ministry of the Government of Guyana

Cooperative Republic of Guyana Ministry of Legal Affairs and Attorney General's Chambers

Agency overview
- Jurisdiction: Guyana
- Headquarters: Georgetown
- Agency executive: Mohabir Anil Nandlall, M.P, Attorney General and Minister of Legal Affairs
- Website: mola.gov.gy

The Ministry of Legal Affairs and Attorney General's Chambers ensures that proper legal services are provided to the Government of Guyana, as well as statutory services to the public. The Attorney General and Minister of Legal Affairs is the head of the chambers. The Permanent Secretary of the Ministry of Legal Affairs handles administrative responsibilities for the departments within the Ministry and is the Accounting Officer. The Advice and Litigation Division and the Drafting Division of the Attorney General's Chambers are headed by the Attorney General and Chief Parliamentary Counsel respectively.

== List of attorneys general ==
British Guiana

- Sir William Arrindell (1845–1852)
- Robert R. Craig (1852–?1855)
- Sir John Lucie Smith (1855–1863)
- Joseph Trounsell Gilbert (1863->1871)
- William Frederick Haynes Smith (1874–1888)
- John Worrell Carrington (1889–1896)
- Henry Alleyn Bovell (1896–1902)
- Sir Joseph John Nunan (<1924–1925)
- Hector Archibald Josephs (1925–1936)
- Sir John Harry Barclay Nihill (1936–1938)
- Edward Owen Pretheroe (1939–1946)
- Edgar Mortimer Duke (1947–)
- Frank Wilfred Holder (–1953–1955)
- Sir William Campbell Wylie (1955–1956)
- Anthony Mordaunt Innis Austin (1957–)
- Sir Fenton Harcourt Wilworth Ramsahoye (1961–1964)
- Forbes Burnham (1964–1965)

Guyana - Post-independence in 1966

- Shridath Ramphal (1965–1972) [served as the Minister of Justice 1973–1978]
- Mohamed Shahabuddeen (1973–1987) [also the Minister of Legal Affairs 1978–1987]
- Keith Massiah (1988–1992) [also referred to as the Minister of Legal Affairs]
- Bernard de Santos (1993–1997) [also referred to as the Minister of Legal Affairs]
- Charles Ramson (1998–2002) [also referred to as the Minister of Legal Affairs]
- Doodnauth Singh (2002–2009) [also referred to as the Minister of Legal Affairs]
- Charles Ramson (2009–2011) [also referred to as the Minister of Legal Affairs]
- Mohabir Anil Nandlall (2011–2014) [also referred to as the Minister of Legal Affairs]
- Basil Williams (2015–2020) [also referred to as the Minister of Legal Affairs]
- Mohabir Anil Nandlall (2020–Present) [also referred to as the Minister of Legal Affairs]

== See also ==
- Justice ministry
- Politics of Guyana
