= 2020 Guyanese protests =

The 2020 Guyanese protests were mass deadly protests and rioting against the results of the 2020 Guyanese general election in March 2020 in Guyana and claimed there was electoral voter fraud during the campaigns, calling for the end of the political crisis and the resignation of President David Granger, yet fresh elections.

== Background ==
Guyana has a long history of protest actions, such as the disturbances and demonstrations in 1962–1963 against working conditions and demands for reforms grew. Riots and popular unrest in 1964 countrywide left at least 110 dead and no concessions were made. This time, the government dispersed protesters and didn't tolerate any acts of disobedience.

== Protests ==
Dissenters marches, protest rallies, strikes, labor protests, demonstrations, unrest, rioting, civil disobedience movement, significant discontent and campaigns for new elections led by the opposition turned violent. Turmoil spilled onto the streets and turned was burned.

Schoolchildren and young adults participated in the protests, burning tires vehicles and sticks, chanting anti-government slogans and demanded new elections in the country. Police used Tear gas and killed an 18-year-old unemployed man in the city as protesters ramped up the protests.

3 days of popular protests and countrywide demonstrations turned violent. Berbice was the epicenter of protests where protesters demanded the overhaul of the elections over electoral fraud and rigging of the elections. The rioting had turned deadly.

== See also ==
- 1999 Surinamese protests
