= Citizenship Initiative (Guyana) =

Political party in Guyana

The Citizenship Initiative
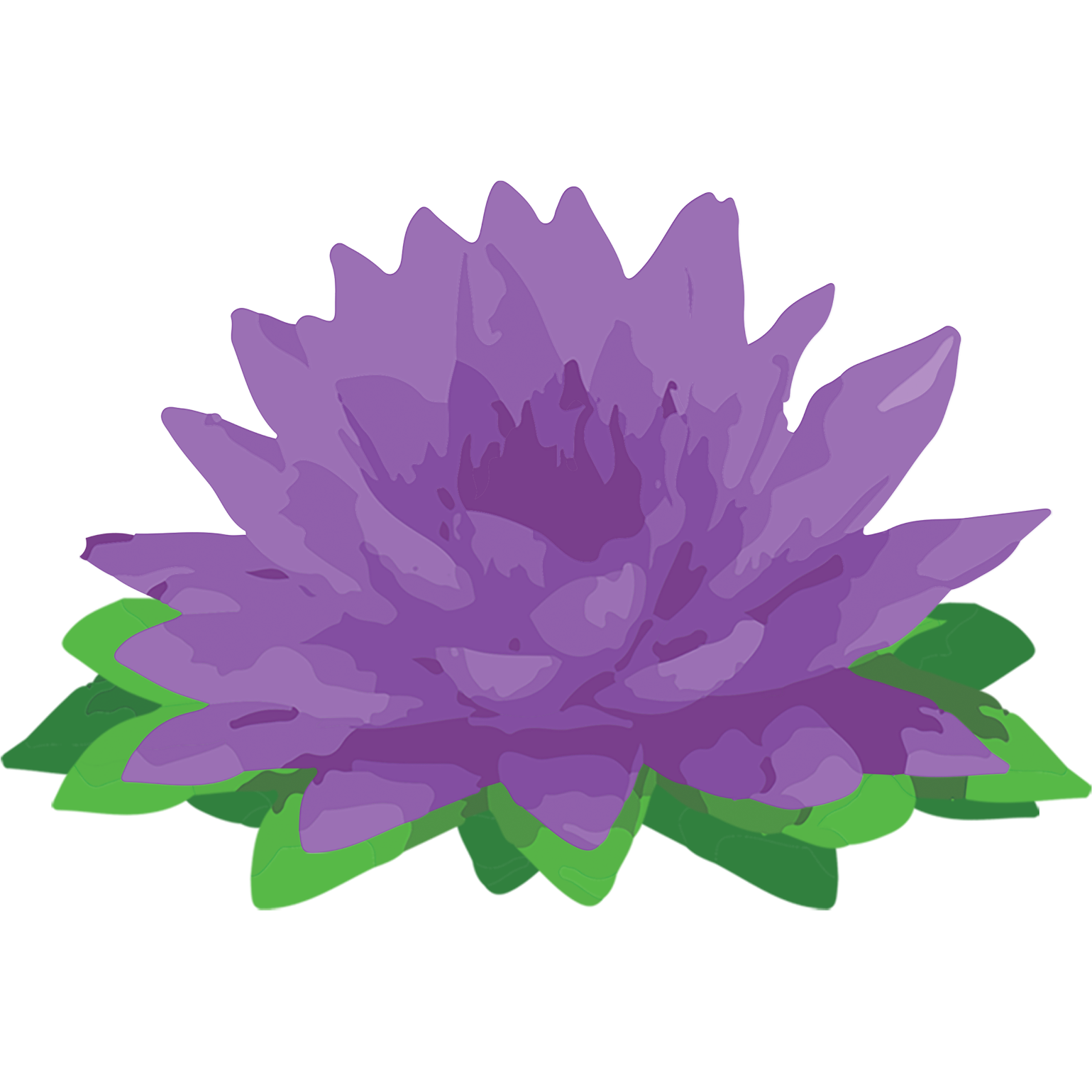
- Leader: Rondha-Ann Lam
- Chairperson: Shazaam Ally
- Secretary: Delon Moffett
- General Secretary: Ruel Johnson
- Vice Chairperson: Delon Moffett
- Founded: 17 October 2019
- Headquarters: Kingston, Georgetown, Guyana

Website
- https://www.citizenship.gy

The Citizenship Initiative (TCI) is a political party in Guyana.

== History ==
TCI was established in Guyana on 17 October 2019. TCI contested in its first general elections on 2 March 2020 with Rondha-Ann Lam as its presidential candidate. It received 680 votes.
