= Liberty and Justice Party =

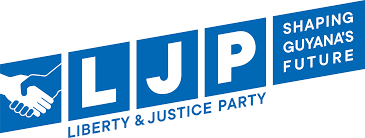
- Leader: Lenox Shuman
- Founded: 12 January 2019
- Ideology: Anti-Racial politics
- Colors: Blue

The Liberty and Justice Party is a political party in Guyana. Its leader and sole MP, Lenox Shuman, has served as Deputy Speaker of the National Assembly since 1 September 2020.

== Founding ==
The Liberty and Justice Party (LJP) was founded on 12 January 2019 by Lenox Shuman, a former toshao (chief) of St. Cuthbert's Mission. Although the party received most support from indigenous voters, it aimed to be inclusive of all Guyanese. In his founding address, Shuman said that the LJP would oppose racial politics and press for more effective government services.

== 2020 general election ==
The LJP ran in the 2020 general election with Shuman as its presidential candidate. In its manifesto, entitled "Pillars of Prosperity", the party promised initiatives to grow the Guyanese economy and improve educational opportunities. Winning 2,657 votes, it gained a shared seat in parliament through an electoral alliance with A New and United Guyana and The New Movement. Shuman was chosen to be the alliance's MP. He was also elected Deputy Speaker of the National Assembly.
