= Susana Rodríguez =

Susana Rodríguez may refer to:

- Susana Rodríguez (artist) (born 1980), Mexican visual artist
- Susana Rodríguez (paratriathlete) (born 1988), Spanish paratriathlete and sprinter
