= Collin Croal =

Guyanese politician

The Honourable Collin Croal MP
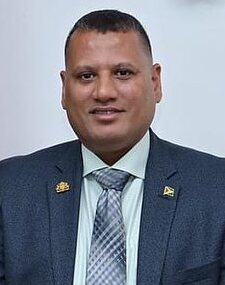
- Croal in 2023

Minister of Housing and Water
- Incumbent
- Assumed office 6 August 2020 Serving with Susan Rodrigues
- Preceded by: Irfaan Ali (2015)

Member of the National Assembly
- Incumbent
- Assumed office 11 June 2015

Personal details
- Education: University Malayu; University of Guyana

Collin David Croal is a Guyanese politician who has served as the Minister of Housing and Water since 6 August 2020.
