= Oneidge Walrond =

Guyanese politician

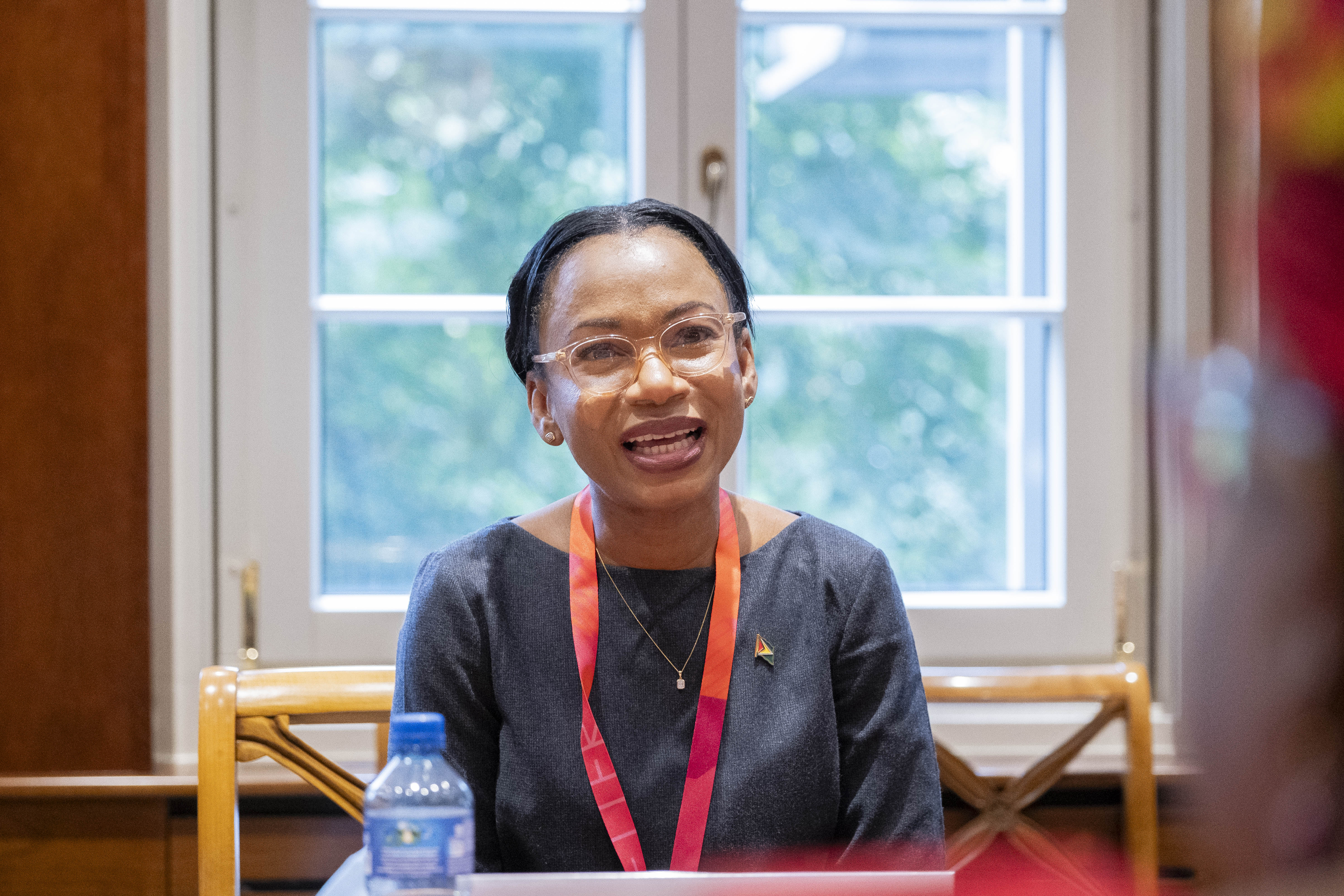

Minister of Tourism, Industry and Commerce
- Incumbent
- Assumed office August 5, 2020

Personal details
- Party: People's Progressive Party (Guyana)

Oneidge Walrond (born in Guyana) is a Guyanese politician. She is the current Minister of Tourism, Industry, and Commerce in Guyana. Walrond was appointed Minister by President Irfaan Ali on August 5, 2020.

== Concerns over Appointment ==
Several ministers and government officials raised cases that the appointment of Walrond was in fact "Unconstitutional". Walrond was again sworn in on December 1 as minister. She had first taken the oath of office as Minister on August 5 and then oath as an MP on September 1. According to reports, the appointments "transgressed" the law as she was still a Dual Citizen. The APNU+AFC opposition filed a lawsuit at the High Court that Walrond declare that she had been illegally sworn in.

Walrond claimed that she had renounced her US citizenship since August 27, but records showed that she was still having a dual-citizenship as at the time she was sworn in as MP. On December 24, Walrond took a fresh oath of office.
