= Anand Persaud =

Guyanese politician

Minister in the Ministry of Local Government and Regional Development in Guyana
- Incumbent
- Assumed office 5 August 2020
- Appointed by: Irfaan Ali

Personal details
- Party: People's Progressive Party (Guyana)
- Occupation: Politician

Anand Persaud is a Guyanese politician. He is a current Minister of Local Government and Regional Development in Guyana. Persaud was sworn into President Irfaan Ali's cabinet. He was appointed Minister in August 2020.
