= Zulfikar Mustapha =

Guyanese politician

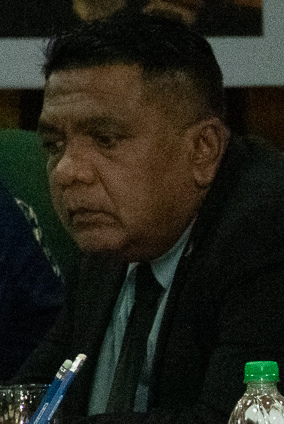

Minister of Agriculture of Guyana
- Incumbent
- Assumed office 5 August 2020
- Appointed by: President Irfaan Ali
- President: Irfaan Ali

Personal details
- Party: People's Progressive Party (Guyana)
- Education: University of the West Indies
- Occupation: Politician

Mustapha Zulfikar is a Guyanese politician. He is the current Minister of Agriculture in Guyana. He was appointed minister on 5 August 2020 by President Irfaan Ali.

== Education ==
Mustapha Zulfikar has a degree in management from the University of the West Indies.

== Career ==
Zulfikar started his career working as Assistant General Secretary of the Guyana Agricultural and General Workers Union (GAWU) between 1989 and 2002. In 2003, he ran for the Guyana National Assembly and was elected that same year. He was elected for a three-year tenure from 2003 to 2006. After his tenure as Member of Parliament, he was subsequently appointed Regional Chairman for Region Six and was in office until 2011. In 2015, he was elected Member of Parliament till 2020.

On 5 August 2020 he was appointed Minister of Agriculture by President Irfaan Ali.
