= Susan Rodrigues =

Guyanese politician (born 1987)

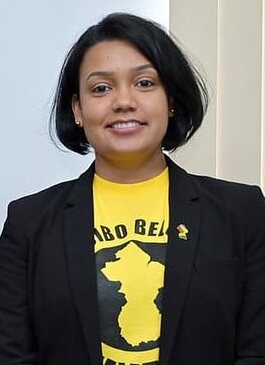
- Parliamentary Portrait, 2020

Minister of Tourism, Industry and Commerce
- Incumbent
- Assumed office 13 September 2025
- Appointed by: Dr. Mohamed Irfaan Ali
- Preceded by: Oneidge Walrond

Minister within the Ministry of House and Water
- In office 6 August 2025 – 13 September 2025

Personal details
- Born: 1987 (age 38–39)
- Occupation: Politician

Susan Margaret Rodrigues (born 1987) is a Guyanese politician. She was the Minister within the Ministry of Housing and Water in Guyana. She was Minister between August 2020 - September 2025. Susan Rodrigues has been appointed Minister of Tourism, Industry and Commerce in September 2025 by President Irfaan Ali
