= Vickram Bharrat =

Guyanese politician

Vickram Outar Bharrat
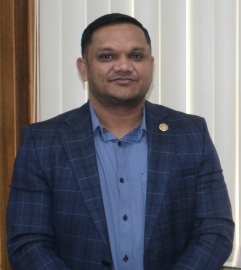
- Bharrat in 2021

Minister of Natural Resources of Guyana
- Incumbent
- Assumed office 5 August 2020

Personal details
- Party: People's Progressive Party/Civic
- Occupation: Politician

Vickram Outar Bharrat (born in Guyana) is a Guyanese politician.

== Career ==
Bharrat worked as the owner of Xenon Academy, fifteen years he has been an educator, mentor and entrepreneur. He is a current Minister of Natural Resources in Guyana. Bharrat was sworn into President Irfaan Ali's cabinet on 5 August 2020, by Irfaan Ali.

== Education ==
Vickram Bharrat is qualified in the area of Public Management and has a Bachelor’s Degree in Computer Science from the University of Guyana, he has vast experience in governance and managerial competency.
