= Lenox Shuman =

Guyanese politician (born 1973)

The Honourable Lenox Shuman
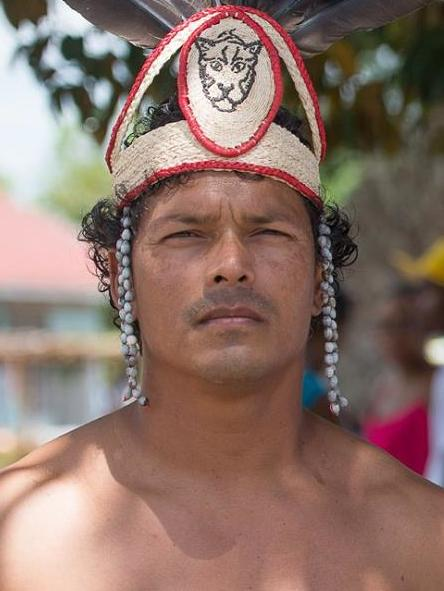

Deputy Speaker of the National Assembly of Guyana
- In office 2 September 2020 – 31 March 2023
- Preceded by: Deborah Backer
- Succeeded by: Asha Kissoon

Member of the National Assembly
- In office 2 September 2020 – 31 March 2023

Personal details
- Born: 13 September 1973 (age 52) St. Cuthbert's Mission, Guyana

Lenox Ron O'Dell Shuman (born 13 September 1973) is a Guyanese former politician who served as Deputy Speaker of the National Assembly of Guyana and Member of Parliament from 2 September 2020 to 31 March 2023. He is also the founder of the Liberty and Justice Party.

On 2 September 2020, Shuman became the first Indigenous-Guyanese to become Deputy Speaker of the National Assembly.

== Background ==
Shuman was born on 13 September 1973. His mother was of mixed race, and his father descended from a long line of Lokono chiefs. In 1990, the family emigrated to Canada. He graduated from Confederation College in business and obtained a pilot licence. Before entering the world of politics, Shuman was a Canadian citizen working as a pilot for Sunwing Airlines. In 2009, he married Amanda Van Herten.

In 2009, Shuman returned to Guyana, and was elected toshao (village chief) for St. Cuthbert's Mission in 2015. The same year, he was elected vice-chairman of the National Toshaos Council. In 2019, the courts ruled that members of the National Assembly had to have Guyanese citizenship only, therefore Shuman relinquished his Canadian citizenship, to form the Liberty and Justice Party and run for president in the March 2020 Guyanese general election.
