= Frank C.S. Anthony =

Guyanese politician

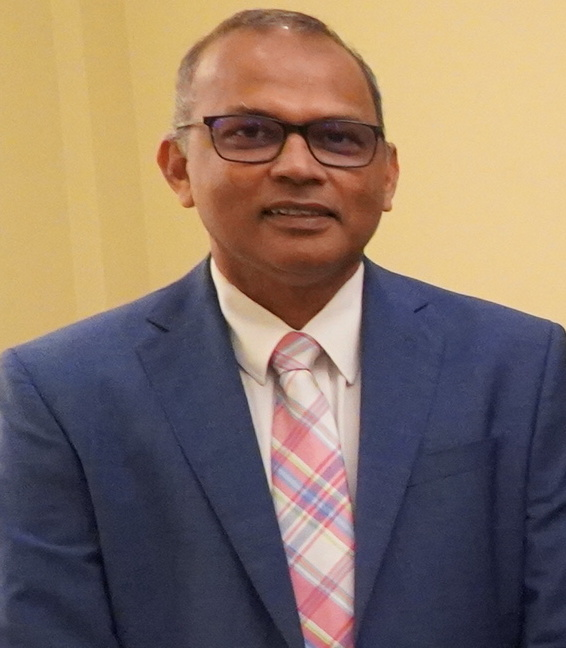
- Anthony in 2022

Minister of Health of Guyana
- Incumbent
- Assumed office 5 August 2020

Personal details
- Party: People's Progressive Party (Guyana)
- Occupation: Politician

Frank Christopher Stanislaus Anthony is a Guyanese politician. He is the current Minister of Health for the Government of Guyana. Anthony was appointed Minister in August 2020 by President Irfaan Ali.

== Biography ==
Anthony attended Peoples' Friendship University of Russia where he studied medicine and obtained a Bachelor of Science degree. He also attended Hebrew University where he obtained a Master's in Public Health degree. Prior to his nomination as minister, Anthony served as executive director of the Health Sector Development Unit Ministry of Health.
