= Mohabir Anil Nandlall =

Guyanese politician

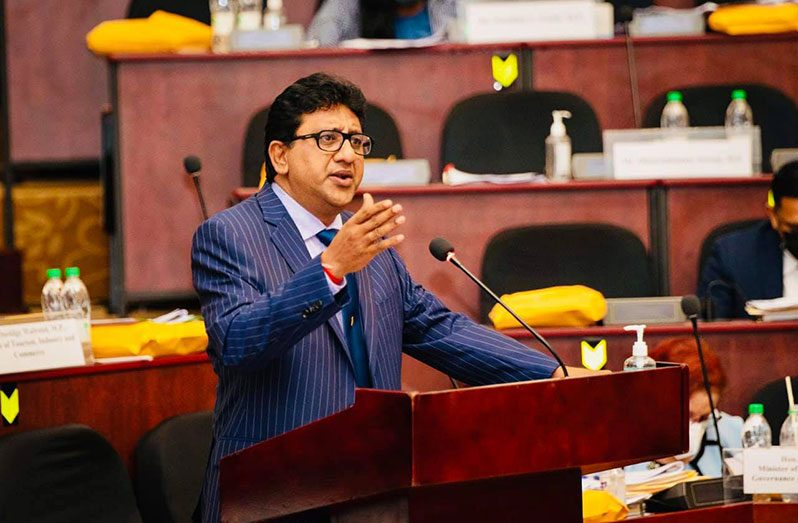

Attorney General and Minister of Legal Affairs
- In office 5 August 2020 – Present
- President: Irfaan Ali
- Preceded by: Basil Williams
- In office 2011–2015
- President: Donald Ramotar
- Preceded by: Charles Ramson
- Succeeded by: Basil Williams

Personal details
- Born: Mohabir Anil Nandlall; 17 February 1972
- Party: People's Progressive Party
- Occupation: Politician/Senior Counsel Lawyer

Mohabir Anil Nandlall (born 17 February 1972) Guyana's current Attorney General and Minister of Legal Affairs. He previously held this position from 2011 to 2015 under former president Donald Ramotar, before serving as the Shadow Attorney General and Member of Parliament PPP/C when they were in the opposition. After the PPP/C won a long and arduously contested elections in 2020, he was sworn in once again under current President Irfaan Ali.

He was raised in a Guyanese family of Indian heritage, belonging to the wider Indo-Guyanese community descended from Indian indentured labourers who arrived during the colonial period. His family has ancestral roots in the Chamar community of India and identifies with the Ravidassia tradition.

He is also a practicing lawyer who has represented numerous clients in high-profile cases in Guyana. Nandlall provided legal representation for the PPP/C in court challenges related to the election results, where his persuasive and effective arguments helped secure a victory for the party in the Court of Appeal, which declared the PPP/C the winner of the election.

In a crucial case at the Caribbean Court of Justice (CCJ), which challenged the validity of the election results, Nandlall's advocacy and legal representation were praised by the court. The CCJ noted that his "impassioned and persuasive arguments" were an "outstanding example of legal advocacy." The court ultimately upheld the results of the election and confirmed Irfaan Ali as the new President of Guyana.

Nandlall also provided legal advice to the government and argued in favor of the PPP/C's interpretation of the Constitution in a case related to the requirement for an absolute majority in parliament. The case centered on the interpretation of Article 106(6) of the Constitution, and Nandlall's arguments helped secure a ruling in favor of the PPP/C's interpretation, which found that a simple majority was sufficient for a vote of no confidence against the government.

As Attorney General and Minister of Legal Affairs, Nandlall works feverishly on a number of legal and policy issues, including constitutional reform, anti-corruption efforts, and modernizing Guyana's legal system. He also plays a key role in the government's efforts to promote investment and economic development in the country.
