= United Republican Party (Guyana) =

Political party in Guyana

The United Republican Party (URP) is a political party in Guyana.

== History ==
The URP was established in the United States by Vishnu Bandhu in March 1985, before being launched in Guyana in November 1987; it was formally registered on 26 April 1988. In 1990 it suffered a split when some members left to form the National Republican Party. The party contested the 1992 general elections, but received just 0.4% of the vote and failed to win a seat.

The URP did not contest any further elections until 2015, when, still led by Bandhu, it received just 432 votes (0.11%), again failing to win a seat.
