= Sonia Parag =

Guyanese politician

Sonia Savitri Parag
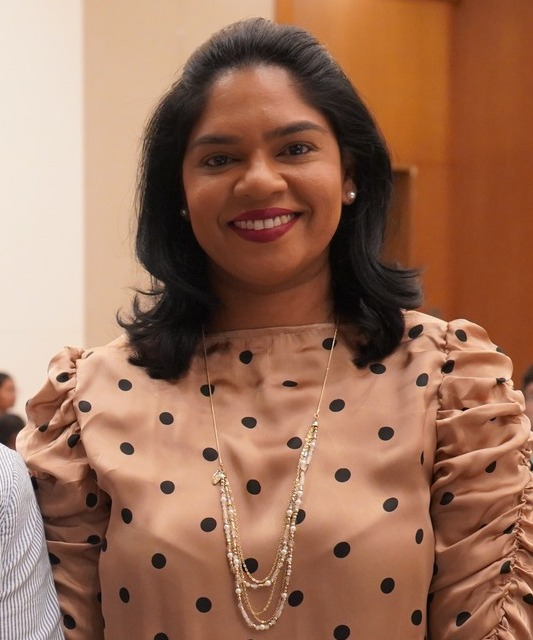
- Parag in 2025

Minister of Education
- Incumbent
- Assumed office 31 October 2025
- President: Irfaan Ali
- Preceded by: Priya Manickchand

Minister of Local Government and Regional Development in Guyana
- In office 5 August 2020 – 31 October 2025

Personal details
- Occupation: Politician. Attorney-at-Law.

Sonia Savitri Parag (born 1983) is a Guyanese politician. She is the former Guyanese Minister of Local Government and Regional Development in President Irfaan Ali's Cabinet. Parag was originally sworn in as the Minister of Public Service on 5 August 2020. Sonia Parag is now the Minister of Education.

== Early life ==
Parag was born in Anna Regina in 1983 to Hukumchand and Edith Parag. She has eight siblings.

Like her father Hukumchand and sister Kamini, Parag is an attorney at law. After completing her LLB at the University of Guyana in 2005, Parag attended Hugh Wooding Law School and received her Legal Education Certificate in August 2007. She was called to the bar in Guyana in October 2007.
