= Pauline Campbell-Sukhai =

Guyanese politician

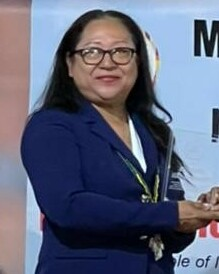

Minister of Amerindian Affairs in Guyana
- Incumbent
- Assumed office 5 August 2020
- President: Irfaan Ali
- Preceded by: Sydney Allicock
- In office 4 January 2008 – 15 May 2015
- President: Bharrat Jagdeo; Donald Ramotar
- Preceded by: Carolyn Rodrigues
- Succeeded by: Sydney Allicock

Personal details
- Occupation: Politician

Pauline Rose Ann Campbell-Sukhai is a Guyanese politician. She is the current Minister of Amerindian Affairs in Guyana. She was appointed Minister on August 5, 2020, by President Irfaan Ali. She had previously served in that position from 4 January 2008 to 15 May 2015.
