= Juan Edghill =

Guyanese politician (born 1964)

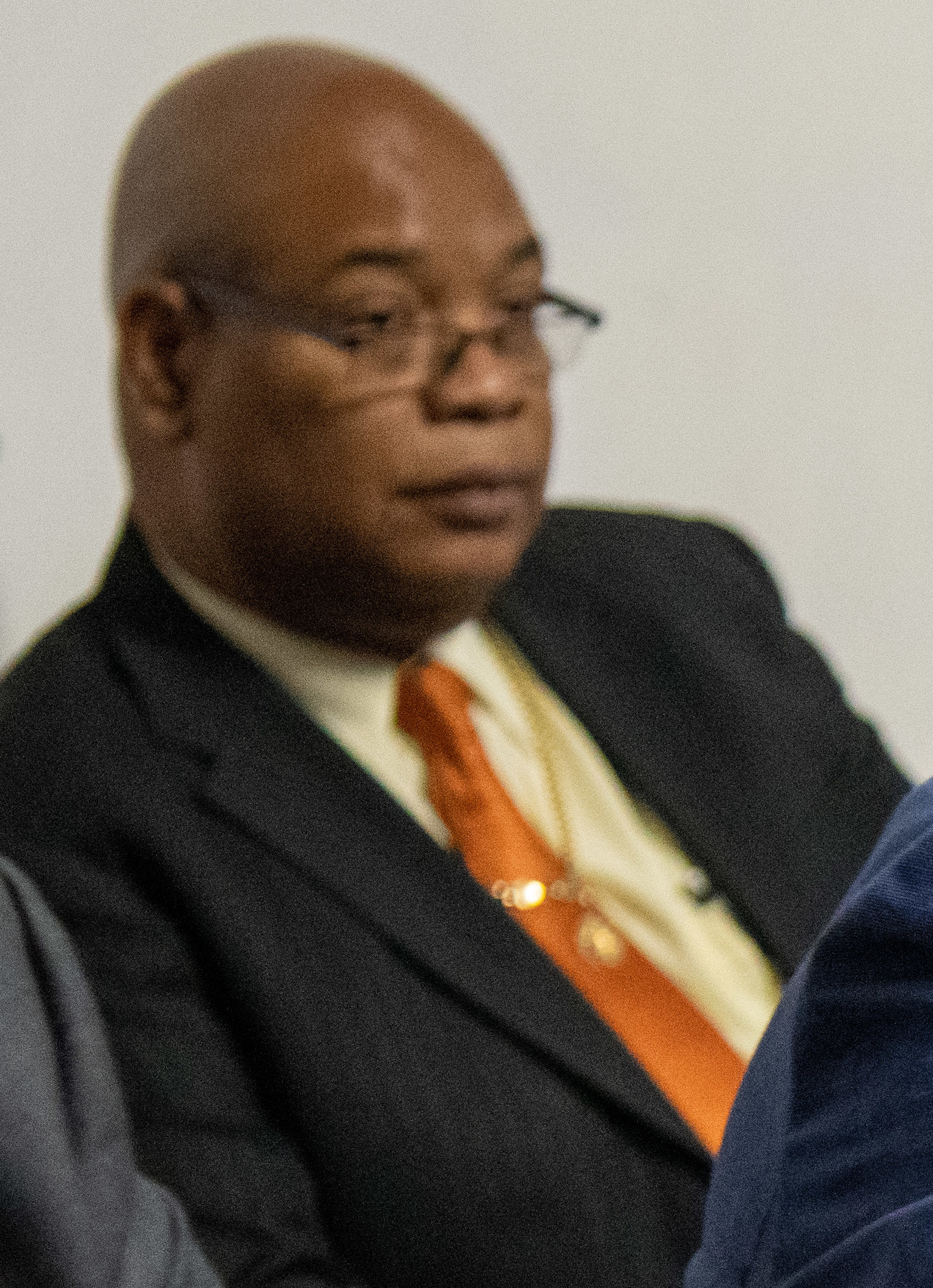
- Edghill in 2020

Minister of Public Works of Guyana
- Incumbent
- Assumed office 5 August 2020

Personal details
- Born: Juan Anthony Edghill; 25 December 1964 (age 61) Georgetown, Guyana
- Party: People's Progressive Party
- Occupation: Politician

Juan Anthony Edghill (born 25 December 1964) is a Guyanese pastor and politician. He is the founder and presiding bishop of Zadok Ministers Fellowship. Edghill is also the current Guyanese Minister of Public Works in Guyana.

== Biography ==
Edghill was born in Georgetown on 25 December 1964. He attended Hauraruni Full Gospel Missionary Training Center in 1983 and obtained a Diploma in Theology in 1986.

== Career ==
Between 2003 and 2011, Edghill was the Chairman of Ethnic Relations Commission (ERC) in Guyana. In 2013, Edghill became a parliamentarian in Guyana and was subsequently appointed Minister in August 2020 by President Irfaan Ali. He's a member of the People's Progressive Party.
