= Irfaan Ali =

President of Guyana since 2020

- Ali in 2025

10th President of Guyana
- Incumbent
- Assumed office 2 August 2020
- Vice President: Bharrat Jagdeo
- Prime Minister (also First Vice President): Mark Phillips
- Preceded by: David A. Granger

Minister of Housing and Water
- In office 7 January 2009 – 20 May 2015
- President: Bharrat Jagdeo; Donald Ramotar
- Prime Minister: Sam Hinds
- Preceded by: Harrinarine Nawbatt
- Succeeded by: Ronald Bulkaan (Note: as Minister of Communities)

Chairman of the Caribbean Community
- In office 1 January 2024 – 30 June 2024
- Preceded by: Roosevelt Skerrit
- Succeeded by: Dickon Mitchell

Personal details
- Born: Mohamed Irfaan Ali; 25 April 1980 (age 46) Leonora, Essequibo Islands-West Demerara, Guyana
- Party: People's Progressive Party/Civic
- Spouse: Arya Ali (m. 2017)
- Children: 3
- Education: St. Stanislaus College
- Alma mater: University of Sunderland (BA); Anglia Ruskin University (MA); National Institute of Labour Economics, Guru Gobind Singh Indraprastha University (MS); University of Salford (LLM); University of the West Indies (PhD)
- Awards: Pravasi Bharatiya Samman (2023)

Mohamed Irfaan Ali (born 25 April 1980) is a Guyanese politician serving as the tenth and current president of Guyana since 2020. A member of the People's Progressive Party/Civic (PPP/C), he previously served as the minister of Housing and Water from 2009 to 2015. He is the first Muslim to hold the office, and is the second Muslim head of state in the Americas after Noor Hassanali of Trinidad and Tobago.

Ali was a member of parliament (MP) and served as a cabinet minister under Donald Ramotar until 2015. In 2020, he became the presidential candidate for the People's Progressive Party/Civic (PPP/C). He won the March 2020 general election. His swearing in as Guyana's tenth president was delayed for months, until 2 August 2020, due to extensive legal challenges regarding the integrity of the election and a recount of all electoral ballots. He won re-election to a second term as president in the general election held on 1 September 2025.

== Early life and education ==
Mohamed Irfaan Ali was born on 25 April 1980 into an Indo-Guyanese Muslim family to Bibi Shariman Neshaw and Mohamed Osman Ali in Leonora, a village in the West Coast Demerara region of Guyana. The child of two educators and one of two sons, Ali also spent many of his formative years on the island of Leguan.

His maternal great-great-great grandparents were Ujiari and Bujhawan who were from Basi village, Telogepur thana in Basti jela in present-day Uttar Pradesh, India. Ali is descended from them through their son Dildar. Dildar, Ujiari, and her four other children and a daughter-in-law immigrated to then British Guiana as indentured laborers in 1894 aboard the ship Rhine. They were indentured to Plantation Success in Leguan.

He is a former student of the Leonora Nursery and Primary schools and Cornelia Ida Primary. Ali completed his secondary education at St. Stanislaus College in Georgetown, Guyana.

Ali holds a doctorate in Urban and Regional Planning from the University of the West Indies. In 2003, he completed his master's degree in Human Resource Planning Development from the National Institute of Labour Economics, affiliated with the Guru Gobind Singh Indraprastha University, New Delhi. In 2023, the university awarded him an Honorary Doctorate. He also has a Master of Arts degree in manpower planning, a post-graduate diploma in international business, and a post-graduate certificate in finance from Anglia Ruskin University, a Master of Law degree in international commercial law from the University of Salford and a Bachelor of Arts degree with honours in business management from the University of Sunderland.

== Early career ==
Ali served as project manager of the Caribbean Development Bank's Project Implementation Unit in the Ministry of Finance, and as a senior planner in the State Planning Secretariat.

== Early political career ==
Ali became a member of the National Assembly of Guyana in 2006. He was appointed to the portfolios of minister of housing and water and minister of tourism industry and commerce.

During his tenure as minister, Ali performed the functions of president and prime minister on separate occasions. In 2015, the People's Progressive Party/Civic (PPP/C) went into opposition during which time he served as chair of the Public Accounts Committee and co-chair of the Economic Services Committee of the parliament of Guyana.

== Presidency ==
=== 2020 campaign ===
Irfaan Ali was the presidential candidate of the People's Progressive Party (PPP/C) for the 2 March 2020 general and regional elections in Guyana. He was selected as the presidential candidate for the People's Progressive Party/Civic on 19 January 2019. His selection came at a time after Ali had been charged with 19 counts of conspiracy and fraud by Guyana's Special Organized Crime Unit (SOCU). Ali's lawyers questioned the legality of these charges, and claimed that they were political in nature and "trumped up". At the time when Ali was running for president, the charges had never been brought to a full court hearing.

Immediately following his selection, Ali was accused of academic fraud, with opponents claiming that when Ali was in his early 20s, he had misrepresented one of his qualifications. Ali was also indicted on 19 charges of other fraud for allegedly defrauding the state of over $174M between 2011 and 2015, allegedly conspiring with persons unknown to "greatly undersell" 19 plots of state lands at Plantation Sparendaam and Goedverwagting in Demerara-Mahaica to current or former government officials.

The trial on the matters was postponed several times. He was granted self bail on the charges. The lands, which were sold for $39.8M, are valued at $212.4M, according to the Special Organized Crime Unit (SOCU). On 14 August, the charges were dismissed.

In his 2020 campaign for the presidency, Ali ran on a mainly economic platform, citing declining growth and increased joblessness under the Granger administration. Ali committed to creating 50,000 new jobs over five years. He has emphasized the need for transparency and adherence to globally-recognised standards for Guyana's nascent oil sector, which is expected to transform Guyana's development. Ali is committed to establishing a sovereign wealth fund "protected against political interference", and to strengthen Guyana's ability to uphold the Santiago Principles and the global requirements of the Extractive Industries Transparency Initiative.

=== Foreign policy ===
==== United States ====
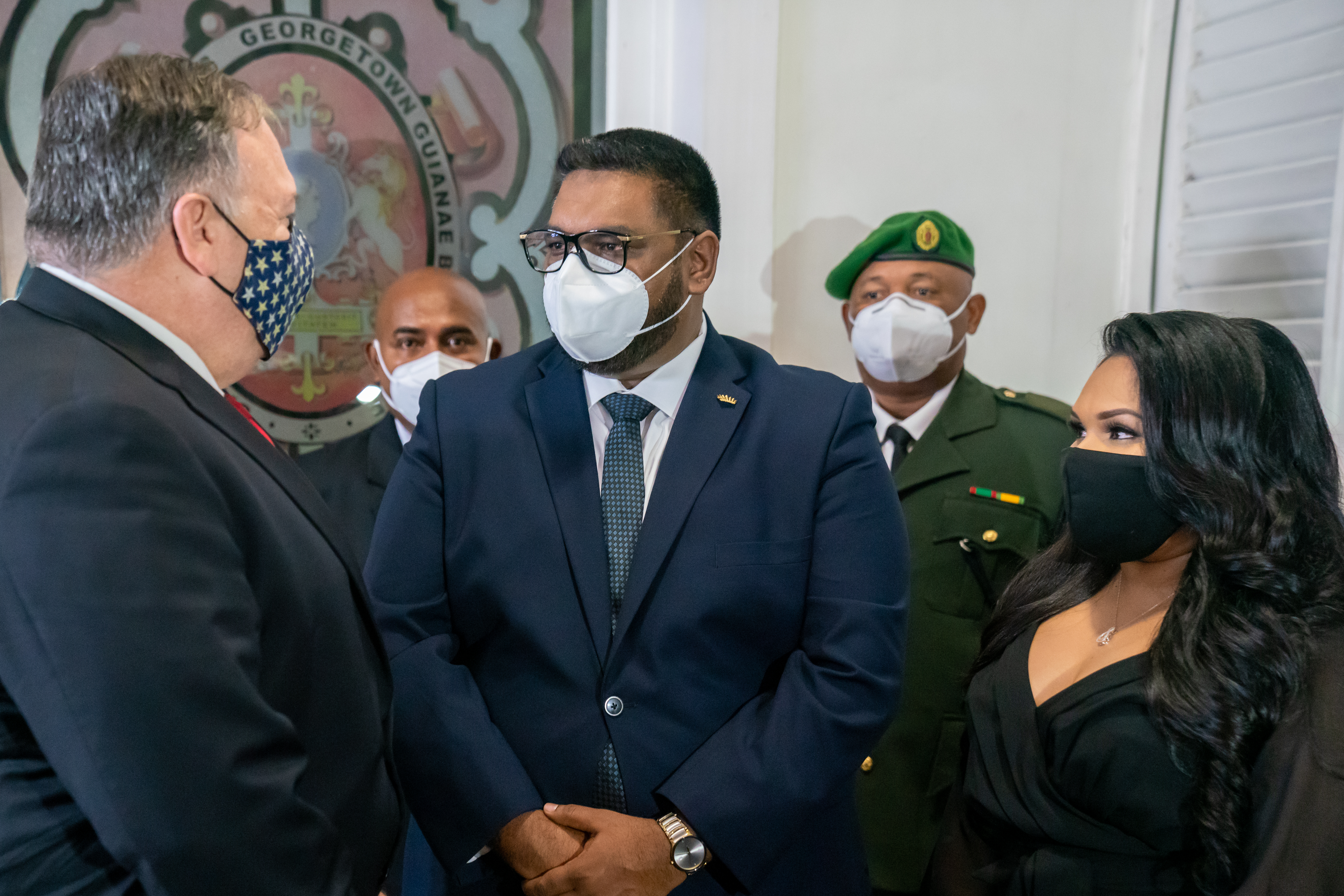
Ali with U.S. secretary of state Mike Pompeo, September 2020

Ali at the Shield of the Americas summit in Florida, March 2026

In September 2020, in a joint statement with the United States secretary of state Mike Pompeo, Ali said the two countries would begin joint maritime patrols aimed at drug interdiction near Guyana's disputed border with Venezuela. The agreement came as U.S. oil major Exxon Mobil Corp, as part of a consortium with Hess Corporation, ramped up crude output from Guyana's massive offshore Stabroek block, a large portion of which is in waters claimed by Venezuela. Pompeo and Ali added that "greater security, greater capacity to understand your border space, what's happening inside your Exclusive Economic Zone - those are all things that give Guyana sovereignty."

==== Israel ====
In April 2024, Ali called Israel's actions in the Gaza Strip "nothing short of genocide".

=== 2025 campaign ===
Ali won re-election to a second term as president in the general election held on 1 September 2025.

== Awards and honours ==
Ali is a recipient of the following honours:

  (India)
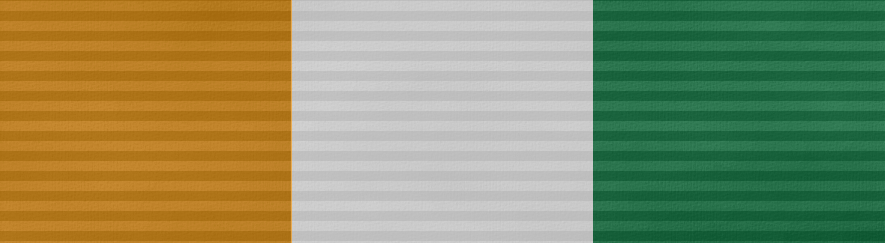
  - Pravasi Bharatiya Samman

In 2023, the Government of India conferred the Pravasi Bharatiya Samman (Overseas Indian Award) to Ali in recognition of his contribution in "Politics/Community Welfare" and for "outstanding achievements both in India and abroad".

  - Order of Freedom of Barbados

In 2023, the Government of Barbados conferred the Order of Freedom of Barbados to Ali "in recognition of his strong commitment to enhance cooperation to achieve regional cooperation and collaboration to achieve regional integration and foster deeper social and economic partnerships particularly in relation to Food and Nutrition Security and for the upliftment of the people of Barbados and the region."

== See also ==
- List of current heads of state and government
- List of heads of the executive by approval rating

== See also ==
- Islam in Guyana

Political offices
Preceded by Harrinarine Nawbatt	Minister of Housing and Water; 2009–2015	Succeeded by Ronald Bulkaan as Minister of Communities
Preceded by David A. Granger	President of Guyana; 2020–present	Incumbent
