= Mahaica River =

- Location of mouth

Location
- Country: Guyana
- Region: Demerara-Mahaica, Mahaica-Berbice

Physical characteristics
- Mouth: Atlantic Ocean
  - location: Mahaica
  - coordinates: 6°43′N 57°55′W

The Mahaica River is a small river in northern Guyana that drains into the Atlantic Ocean. The village of Mahaica is found at its mouth.

It is one of Guyana's principal coastal streams that also forms a rough border between the Demerara-Mahaica region and the Mahaica-Berbice region. The extent of brackish water that has made its way inland has been recorded at 12 miles. The estimated flow in cubic ft. per second is 1,700 (wet season) and 700 (dry season).

The origin of the Mahaica is difficult to trace because its upper watersheds overlap with the lower watersheds of the Demerara and Berbice rivers. The river breaks off into smaller tributaries making it seem "boundless."

== Wildlife ==
The river is a well known bird-watching site, as well as home to other wildlife including river otters, howler monkeys and the Canje Pheasant, Guyana's national bird. 150 species of birds can be found along the Mahaica River.

== Economy ==
Farming is the predominant human use of the lower reaches of the river. Rice is the main crop. The river is prone to flooding.

Bellamy canal was dug in 1954 to connect Mahaica to the Mahaicony River, as a conservancy for the regulation of the river discharge to avoid flooding in the coastal plain rather than the traditional structure of empoldering small ‘islands’ of land. The Rutherford Canal connects Mahaica to Broom Hall.

Mahaica, Mahaicony, Abary-Agricultural Development Authority was formed in 1978 as a semi-autonomous agency for encouraging sustainable agricultural development between the Berbice and Mahaica Rivers. Its purpose was to be the executing agency for construction of all drainage and irrigation works in Mahaica-Berbice on the north-eastern Atlantic seacoast. Hope Canal was built to alleviate flooding by redistributing water into the Mahaica. It was conceived after the major 2005 Georgetown flood. When the East Demerara Water Conservancy is at capacity, Lama and Maduni sluices release water into the Mahaica River. In 2011, a boulder wall was built to protect agriculture from flooding during high tides.

In 2020, plans for a luxury mega-project along the river was announced.

== Settlements ==
St. Cuthbert's Mission is a major Amerindian community on the river.

== See also ==
- List of rivers of Guyana
- List of rivers of the Americas by coastline
- Agriculture in Guyana
