= Whelpton =

Whelpton is a surname. Notable people with the surname include:

- Barbara Whelpton (1910–1995), English artist and author
- Eric Whelpton (1894–1981), English writer and poet
- Fred Whelpton (1885–1965), Australian rules footballer
- Ike Whelpton (1887–1944), English footballer
- John Whelpton (born 1950), British historian
- Tiaan Whelpton (born 2000), New Zealand athlete
