= Sea Wall, Guyana =

280-mile wall in Guyana

Coordinates: 6.825414°N 58.159106°W

The Guyanese Sea Wall
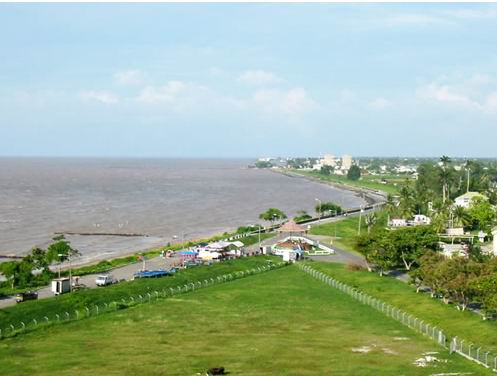
- A section of the Sea Wall in Georgetown
- Interactive map of The Guyanese Sea Wall
- Location: Guyana
- Length: 280 m (920 ft)

The Sea Wall is a 280-mile seawall that runs along much of Guyana's coastline, including all of the coastline in the capital city of Georgetown. It protects settlements in the coastal areas of Guyana, most of which are below sea level at high tide.

== Construction ==
During the 1855 Kingston Flood an earthen wall was breached. It inundated the Kingston ward of Georgetown and washed away Camp House (the former residence for governors of the colony).

It was after this catastrophe that the sea wall between Fort William Frederick and the Round House was started in 1858. Built principally by convict labor with granite from the Penal Settlement at Mazaruni (now Mazaruni Prison), the first section, which ran from Fort Groyne to Round House was completed by 1860. In 1874, the Public Works department of British Guiana committed to the construction of a continuous wall from Camp Street to Kitty. By 1882, the Sea Wall had been extended to reach as far as Unity Village and it was completed in 189222

== See also ==
- East Demerara Water Conservancy
- Water supply and sanitation in Guyana
- 2005 Georgetown flood
