= East Demerara Water Conservancy =

Water storage facility in Guyana

The East Demerara Water Conservancy (EDWC) is one of Guyana's major water storage and flood control facilities. Over 500,000 residents inhabit the basin that lies below and between the sea wall and the EDWC Dam in a 48 km band from Georgetown to Mahaica. Located in Demerara-Mahaica, the EDWC serves to irrigate thousands of hectares of rice and other crops within this area by storing rain water for dry periods and it also provides one of the primary source (about 60%) of drinking water for the capital city of Georgetown.

The irrigation network also has a number of drainage relief structures to protect the EDWC Dam from over-topping and collapse during the rainy periods including the Hope Canal, which connects the EDWC to the Atlantic Ocean. The Guyana Sugar Corporation is completely reliant on water from the EDWC.

== Location ==
The EDWC is located 15 miles south of the most densely populated section of the Guyana Coast. It is bounded to the North by a man-made 45 mile earthen dam and to the deep south by a natural topographic rise composing largely of ancient coastal dune formation over geological time. The EDWC Dam is constructed of clay and pagasse (an organic soil also known as tropical peat).

- Surface Area - 130 Sq. miles
- Catchment Area - 200 Sq. miles
- Length of Conservancy Dam - 45 miles
- Full Storage Level - 57.5 ft GD
- Dead Storage Level - 53.5 ft GD
- No. of Intake Structures - 27
- Relief Structures - 5

== History of the EDWC ==
Guyana's drainage and irrigation system has its origins in the late 1600s under the Dutch colonial rule. One of the major innovations of the time was the building of water conservancies (artificial water catchment polderized by earthen dams) to retain fresh water from upland streams during the dry seasons and release via irrigation canals and head regulators.

The EDWC is one of the most important of these conservancies and it was designed over 125 years ago by William Russell and built using slave labour.

Since then, changes in the land use, climate change driven increases in rainfall intensity and a number of other factors have left the EDWC in a fragile state. The National Drainage and Irrigation Authority has worked and continues to work diligently with international assistance to maintain and protect this network.

== Major projects at the EDWC ==
=== JICA Component I ===
The Japan International Cooperation Agency (JICA) sponsored work to improve the EDWC in an effort to assist countries vulnerable to climate change. JICA provided grant aid which was utilized to improve the drainage and irrigation capacity within the EDWC by supplying eight long-reach excavators and two pontoons to the Government of Guyana.

The excavators and pontoons were assembled locally and operators were given essential training in their use. They were deployed immediately after the handing over ceremony in November 2012.

=== JICA Component II ===
The second component of the programme was the rehabilitation of six key EDWC structures in 2016:

1. Sara Johanna Sluice
2. Nancy Intake
3. Annaadale Intake
4. Ann's Grove
5. Shanks Intake
6. Maduni Sluice

Phase II funds were used to obtain the country's first amphibious excavator.

=== The EDWC-Northern Relief Channel ===
The EDWC NRC (Hope Canal) project was designed in response to the 2005 Georgetown flood due to the over-topping of the conservancy dam. The Hope Canal seeks to provide the means to release excess water in the EDWC when it is in danger of over-tapping and breaches. The project is a 10.3 km long earthen channel with a three-door head regulator at the conservancy end of the canal and an eight-door outfall sluice at the Atlantic end. Also included in the project was the construction on a public road bridge that has been in operation since February 2014.

== See also ==
- Water supply and sanitation in Guyana
- Agriculture in Guyana
- Geography of Guyana
