= Melinda Janki =

Guyanese lawyer

Melinda Janki is a Guyanese born lawyer who leads litigation against the Government and large multinational oil companies in Guyana. In 2023 she received the Commonwealth Lawyers Association Rule of Law Award for her work to uphold the rule of law in Guyana and internationally. In 2024 a news article called for her to be recognised as Guyana’s ‘Woman of the Year.’ In June 2025 she delivered a TED talk in Nairobi on her work in litigation against oil companies in Guyana.

Janki took part in the work to write into Guyana’s Constitution a right to a healthy environment, and also took part in drafting legislation to protect the environment. She is a former member of the Steering Committee of the World Council on Environmental Law. She is currently a member at large on the Council of the Commonwealth Lawyers Association. with a keen interest in young lawyers.

Janki has worked extensively with Guyana’s Amerindian peoples for years and was the lead drafter of the Amerindian Act which guarantees Amerindian land rights whether indigenous or non-indigenous and protection against mining. Janki's writings also have an international scope, and in a paper entitled ‘West Papua and the right to self-determination’ she argues that the Papuan independence fight should not be seen as an illegal secession but rather as a lawful struggle for self-determination.

== Early career ==
Janki studied law at Oxford University and University College London and spent part of her early career with BP. She returned to Guyana in the 1990s to participate in its new democracy and was successful at helping to make its new constitution identify environmental concerns, including a stable climate, as human rights for Guyanese citizens. Later, she served as cochair of the IUCN Commission on Environment and Law, Special Indigenous Peoples Group, where she wrote or cowrote works on topics such as rights-based approaches to using justice systems for environmental conservation and about Guyanese peoples. She worked with the WaiWai people to enable them to secure absolute title to their land and create a WaiWai owned protected area, using the Amerindian Act.Guyana's legal systems

== ExxonMobil Suits ==
In 2018 Janki launched the first case against ExxonMobil’s drilling. Although the Caribbean Court of Justice ruled against her client Ramon Gaskin they made a series of other rulings that impact the industry. The court established that litigants seeking to protect the environment in good faith should not have to face adverse costs awards. They also said that Hess and CNOOC could not use their petroleum production licences to produce oil, that Hess and CNOOC are liable for any environmental damage caused by Exxon, that Exxon must comply with international law.

Janki has had a string of victories against ExxonMobil and the Guyana government. Her first victory came in 2020 when she cut ExxonMobil’s environmental permits down from 23 years to 5 years. In 2023 Guyana’s High Court ruled that ExxonMobil had unlimited liability and was in breach of its permit. Following the ruling ExxonMobil’s share price dropped by 12%. This was followed by another ruling that ExxonMobil’s pipeline permit was illegally granted. Janki has been victorious in 2025 in getting court rulings establishing that ExxonMobil’s environmental impact assessments must take into account scope 3 emissions and in another case quashing an environmental permit to set up a waste oil/gas processing facility in a rural community on grounds of illegality.

In 2020 Janki filed a case on behalf of Troy Thomas a university lecturer and Quadad DeFreitas a Wapichan youth challenging the government’s oil development as a violation of the Constitutional right to a healthy environment. The case which is going through the courts now could stop billions of tons of carbon pollution and looks to be the biggest climate change case in the world. ExxonMobil has joined the cases suggesting that it feels that its business model is being threatened.
