= Hope Canal =

Coordinates: 6.7328°N 57.9567°W

The East Demerara Water Conservancy-Northern Relief Channel, better known locally as the Hope Canal, is one of Guyana's largest drainage projects. Construction was from 2011 to November 9, 2013, at a cost of around GYD$3.6 billion.

Hope Canal was designed in response to the 2005 flooding, when a breach in the embankment resulted in floods to almost the entire East Coast of Demerara causing significant damage to agricultural and residential areas. It serves as a medium to release excess water from the EDWC directly to the Atlantic Ocean via an 8-door sluice, during periods of extended rainfall in order to prevent overtopping of conservancy embankment.

The project was criticized for costing well over estimates and two years of delays.

== Structures ==
There are four major components of the Hope Canal Project:

=== Canal ===
The channel has a length of 10.3 km and entirely straight with a bed width of 30m and a top width of 40m. The embankments are at least 8m higher than the surrounding land areas and the width across the top of the embankments is 5m. Approximately 660,520 cubic metres of soil was excavated, then used for the construction of the channel embankments and supplemented with geotextile fabric for added strength.

The Hope Channel has a carrying capacity of 58 cubic metres per second and serves to drain the East Demerara Water Conservancy (EDWC) of excess water. The Conservancy is connect to the Channel through the three door head regulator and the water drains at the northern end of the channel through the eight door High Level Outfall Sluice.

=== Head regulator ===
The head regulator is an intake structure located at the Southern end of the canal. It consist of a sluice with three green heart timber doors. This sluice allows excess water to flow from the EDWC into the Hope Canal. It is manually operated, and water levels in the canal can be monitored by lowering or rising sluice doors. Water levels in the canal are determined by graduated gauges (Unit being Ft GD) placed at specific locations in both the Hope Canal and the EDWC.

This structure is 17m across, with the three doors measuring 5.5m each. There is also a bridge spanning the channel at the structure; this bridge is 5m wide and 18m long. The wing walls of the structure are reinforced with geotextile fabric and the channel bed is protected both at the inlet and outlet sides of the structure by gabion mattresses, extending several metres outwards.

=== High level sluice ===
The largest sluice in Guyana, this structure is located at the northern end of the Hope Canal, conveying excess water to the Atlantic Ocean. It consist of a drainage sluice with eight doors. The overall width of the structure is 89.5m with the eight doors at each 4.875m in width. At the base of the gates there is a high level weir at 16.0mGD level in contrast to the 14.0mGD invert channel depth. This feature, along with the enormous size, discharge capacity, advanced motorized winches and control systems make this structure different from the common sluices.

=== Public road bridge ===
At the point where the channel passes through the East Coast Public Road, a reinforced concrete bridge was constructed to close the gap. In an effort to maintain the integrity of the dam throughout the entire length of the channel, the bridge was constructed in such a manner as to go up and over the embankments. The bridge consist of two 47m sloped approach on both sides, along with the length of the deck being 74.4m. The bridge is designed to accommodate two lanes of traffic as well as protected sidewalks on both sides for pedestrians.

The bridge continued to be under weekly repair even as of 2016, suffering due to "shoddy work".

== Other uses ==
In 2018, a feasibility study was done to determine if surface water contained in the Hope Canal is suitable for use as drinking water.

== See also ==
- Water supply and sanitation in Guyana
- Agriculture in Guyana
