= Moraikobai =

- Etymology: Lokono
- Location within Guyana
- Coordinates: 6.095495°N 57.954708°W
- Country: Guyana
- Province: Mahaica-Berbice
- Region: 5

Population (2015)
  - Total: 500

Moraikobai is an Amerindian village located in the Mahaica-Berbice of Guyana.

== History ==
The community was initially called “Moracoba”; a name that was birthed from a combination of two Lokono words; ‘Mora’ meaning tree and ‘Coba’ meaning stump. However, several decades ago the name was officially changed to ‘Moraikobai’. The village is situated approximately ninety-six miles (154 km) from the confluence of the Mahaicony River, and is only accessible by the Mahaicony creek, helicopter, and trail, the latter of which can be treacherous given that it is of sand; it connects the village to Linden in Region 10 and consists of a population of just over five hundred residents, who are predominantly Indigenous peoples from the Lokono tribe. Dorothy Patoir is said to be the first individual born in the village when it was established many decades ago. Presently, the village is led by a Toshao (Indigenous leader).

== Geography ==
The geographical construct of the village is relatively large, naturally fertile, and mostly unoccupied. Logging and farming are the major economic activities of the village.

== Features ==
Moraikobai has a rich religious heritage, and its people endorse Christianity to a large extent. In this respect, the village consists of three churches including an Anglican church which was established when the community was first inaugurated as a mission. It follows that in the early days the village was known as St. Francis Mission and later, St. Francis District. Moraikobai is also known for its huge benab and exquisite handicraft produced by its skilled residents.

Moraikobai is supported by a health centre, nursery and primary schools and a guest house, which is funded by the Regional Democratic Council (RDC) of region 5. Secondary schooling is done in Mahaicony.
