= Politics of Guyana =

Guyana is a parliamentary republic in which the President of Guyana is both head of state and head of government. Executive power is exercised by the president, advised by a cabinet. Legislative power is vested in both the president and the National Assembly of Guyana. The judiciary is independent of the executive and the legislature.

Recent politics of Guyana has been characterized by democratic backsliding and ethnic polarization.

== Executive branch ==
Arms of the president of Guyana

Main office-holders
| Office | Name | Party | Since |
|---|---|---|---|
| President | Irfaan Ali | People's Progressive Party | 2 August 2020 |
| First vice president and prime minister | Mark Phillips | People's Progressive Party | 2 August 2020 |

Executive authority is exercised by the president, who appoints and supervises the prime minister and other ministers. The cabinet is tasked with aiding and advising the president in the general control and direction of the government. The president is not directly elected; each party presenting a slate of candidates for the assembly must designate in advance a leader who will become president if that party receives the most votes. The president has the authority to dissolve the parliament. While the president appoints the cabinet, it is also collectively responsible to the National Assembly. A successful no-confidence motion against the government obligates the president and cabinet to resign and trigger new elections within 3 months. The president can be removed in case of mental incapacity or gross constitutional violations.

Only the prime minister is required to be a member of the assembly. In practice, most other ministers are also members. Those who are not serve as non-elected members, which permits them to debate but not to vote. The president is not a member of the National Assembly but may address it at any time or have his address read by any member he may designate at a convenient time for the assembly.

== Legislative branch ==
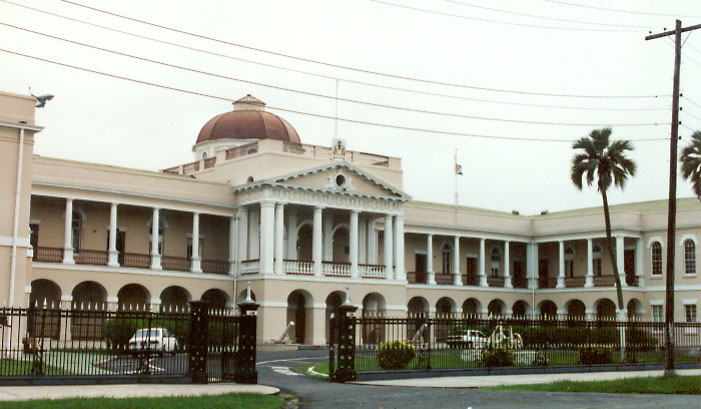
Parliament of Guyana in Georgetown.

Legislative power of Guyana rests in a unicameral National Assembly. In 2001, the makeup of the National Assembly was reformed. Now, 25 members are elected via proportional representation from 10 Geographic Constituencies. Additionally, 40 members are chosen also based on proportional representation from National lists named by the political parties. The president may dissolve the assembly and call new elections at any time, but no later than 5 years from its first sitting.

== Elections ==
Guyana was ranked 6th least electoral democracy in the Americas according to V-Dem Democracy indices for the year 2024.

== Judicial branch ==
Judiciary flag of Guyana, created in 2025

The highest judicial body is the Court of Appeal, headed by a chancellor of the judiciary. The second level is the High Court, presided over by Chief Justice of Guyana. There are also the Five Justices of Appeal who govern the Court of Appeal. The president appoints the chancellor and the chief justice. The Audit Office of Guyana (AOG) is the country's Supreme Audit Institution (SAI).

== Administrative divisions ==
For administrative purposes, Guyana is divided into 10 regions, each headed by a chairman who presides over a regional democratic council. Local communities are administered by village or city councils. The regions are Barima-Waini, Cuyuni-Mazaruni, Demerara-Mahaica, East Berbice-Corentyne, Essequibo Islands-West Demerara, Mahaica-Berbice, Pomeroon-Supenaam, Potaro-Siparuni, Upper Demerara-Berbice and Upper Takutu-Upper Essequibo.

== Political conditions ==
Race and ideology have been the dominant political influences in Guyana. Since the split of the multiracial People's Progressive Party (PPP) in 1955, politics has been based more on ethnicity than on ideology. From 1964 to 1992, the pro-African People's National Congress (PNC) party dominated Guyana's politics.

The overwhelming majority of Guyanese of East Indian descent have traditionally backed the People's Progressive Party. Rice farmers and sugar workers in the rural areas form the bulk of PPP's support. Still, Indo-Guyanese who dominate the country's urban business community have also provided important support.

Following independence, and with the help of substantial foreign aid, social benefits were provided to a broader section of the population, specifically in health, education, housing, road and bridge building, agriculture, and rural development. However, during Forbes Burnham's last years, the government's attempts to build a socialist society caused a massive emigration of skilled workers, and, along with other economic factors, led to a significant decline in the overall quality of life in Guyana.

After Burnham died in 1985, President Hoyte took steps to stem the economic decline, including strengthening financial controls over the parastatal corporations and supporting the private sector. In August 1987, at a PNC Congress, Hoyte announced that the PNC rejected orthodox communism and the one-party state.

As the 1990 elections approached, Hoyte, under increasing pressure from both inside and outside Guyana, gradually opened the political system. After a visit to Guyana by former U.S. President Jimmy Carter in 1990, Hoyte made changes to the electoral rules, appointed a new chairman of the Elections Commission, and endorsed the compilation of new voter lists, thereby delaying the election. The elections, which finally took place in 1992, were witnessed by 100 international observers, including a group headed by Carter and another from the Commonwealth of Nations. Both groups issued reports saying that the elections had been free and fair, despite violent attacks on the Elections Commission building on election day and other irregularities.

Cheddi Jagan served as premier (1957–1964) and then minority leader in parliament until he was elected president in 1992. One of the Caribbean's most charismatic and famous leaders, Jagan was a founder of the PPP which led Guyana's struggle for independence. Over the years, he moderated his Marxist-Leninist ideology. After he was elected president, Jagan demonstrated a commitment to democracy, followed a pro-Western foreign policy, adopted free market policies, and pursued sustainable development for Guyana's environment. Nonetheless, he continued to press for debt relief and a new global human order in which developed countries would increase their assistance to less-developed nations. Jagan died on 6 March 1997 and was succeeded by Sam Hinds, whom he had appointed prime minister. President Hinds then appointed Janet Jagan, widow of the late president, to serve as prime minister.

In national elections on 15 December 1997, Janet Jagan was elected president, and her PPP party won a 55% majority of seats in parliament. She was sworn in on 19 December. Jagan was a founding member of the PPP and was very active in party politics. She was Guyana's first female prime minister and vice president, serving in both roles concurrently before being elected president. She was also unique in being white, Jewish, and a naturalized citizen (born in the United States).

The PNC, which won just under 40% of the vote, disputed the results of the 1997 elections, alleging electoral fraud. Public demonstrations and some violence followed until a CARICOM team came to Georgetown to broker an accord between the two parties, calling for an international audit of the election results, a redrafting of the constitution, and elections under the constitution within 3 years. Jagan resigned in August 1999 due to ill health and was succeeded by Finance Minister Bharrat Jagdeo, who had been named Prime Minister a day earlier. National elections were held on March 19, 2001, three months later than planned, as the election committees said they were unprepared. Fears that the violence that marred the previous election led to monitoring by foreign bodies, including Jimmy Carter. In March, incumbent President Jagdeo won the election with a voter turnout of over 90%. Over 150 international observers representing six international missions witnessed the polling. The observers pronounced the elections fair and open, although marred by some administrative problems.

Meanwhile, tensions with Suriname were seriously strained by a dispute over their shared maritime border after Guyana had granted oil prospectors a license to explore the area.

In December 2002, Hoyte died, with Robert Corbin replacing him as leader of the PNC. He agreed to engage in 'constructive engagement' with Jagdeo and the PPP.

Severe flooding following torrential rainfall wreaked havoc in Guyana beginning in January 2005. The downpour, which lasted about six weeks, inundated the coastal belt, caused the deaths of 34 people, and destroyed large parts of the rice and sugarcane crops. The UN Economic Commission for Latin America and the Caribbean estimated in March that the country would need $415 million for recovery and rehabilitation. About 275,000 people—37% of the population—were affected in some way by the floods. In 2013, the Hope Canal was completed to address the flooding.

In May 2008, President Bharrat Jagdeo was a signatory to the UNASUR Constitutive Treaty of the Union of South American Nations. On 12 February 2010, Guyana ratified its membership in the Union of South American Nations (UNASUR).

In December 2011, President Bharrat Jagdeo was succeeded by Donald Ramotar of the governing People's Progressive Party (PPP/C). However, the ruling party, mainly supported by Guyana's ethnic Indians, lost its parliamentary majority for the first time in 19 years.

In May 2015, David Granger of A Partnership for National Unity and Alliance for Change (APNU+AFC) narrowly won the elections. He represented the alliance of Afro-Guyanese parties. In May 2015, David Granger was sworn in as the new President of Guyana.

In August 2020, the 75-year-old incumbent, David Granger, narrowly lost and did not accept the result. Irfaan Ali of the People's Progressive Party/Civic was sworn in as the new president five months after the election because of allegations of fraud and irregularities.

The Economist Intelligence Unit rated Guyana as "flawed democracy" in 2016. Guyana's ratings on the democracy on the Democracy Index have fluctuated over the years, it continues to be rated as a "flawed democracy".

In September 2025, Irfaan Ali re-elected for second term as Guyana’s president.

== International organization participation ==
Guyana is a full and participating founder-member of the Caribbean Community (CARICOM), headquartered in Georgetown. The CARICOM Single Market & Economy (CSME) will, by necessity, bring Caribbean-wide legislation into force and a Caribbean Court of Justice (CCJ). International affiliations include: ACP, C, Caricom, CCC, CDB, ECLAC, FAO, G-77, IADB, IBRD, ICAO, ICRM, IDA, IFAD, IFC, IFRCS, ILO, IMF, IMO, Intelsat (nonsignatory user), Interpol, IOC, IOM, ISO (subscriber), ITU, ITUC, LAES, NAM, OAS, OPANAL, OPCW, PCA, UN, UNASUR, UNCTAD, UNESCO, UNIDO, UPU, WFTU, WHO, WIPO, WMO, WTrO.

== See also ==
- The Official Gazette of Guyana

== Bibliography ==
- Constitution (2012). "CONSTITUTION OF THE CO-OPERATIVE REPUBLIC OF GUYANA ACT" (PDF). Parliament of Guyana.
