= Abary River =

River in Guyana

Physical characteristics
- Mouth: Atlantic Ocean
  - location: Guyana
  - coordinates: 6°33′00″N 57°44′00″W

The Abary River (Abary Creek) is a small river in northern Guyana that drains into the Atlantic Ocean.

Historic Amerindian settlements existed at Tiger Island and Taurakuli. The upper Abary River, the site of which now lies under the reservoir created by the Mahaica-Mahaicony-Abary project in the 1970s.

Rice farming and cattle are the major economic activities in proximity to the river.

It is home to manatees, some of which were moved to Georgetown's National Park and Botanical Garden .

== See also ==
- List of rivers of Guyana
- Agriculture in Guyana
- Abary - Place in Mahaica-Berbice, Guyana
