= Henry Light =

British colonial governor (1782/3–1870)

His Excellency Sir Henry Light, KCB, Esq. (1782/3, Kimberley House, Falmouth, Great Britain – 3 March 1870, Great Britain and Ireland) was a British colonial administrator who served as the third Governor of British Guiana from 27 June 1838 to 19 May 1848, overseeing the initial developments such as emancipation. He served as Lieutenant Governor of Dominica for 13 months prior and Lieutenant Governor of Antigua in 1836. Before his administrative career, he served in the Royal Artillery.

== Caribbean lieutenant-governorships ==
In 1836, Light was appointed in Lieutenant Governor of British Antigua and arrived in July. Between February 1837 and March 1838, Light served as Lieutenant Governor of British Dominica. From July to August 1837, the Legislative Council stayed proceedings in response to him forbidding Special Magistrates to lash men to exert labor or as punishment.

== Governorship of Guiana ==
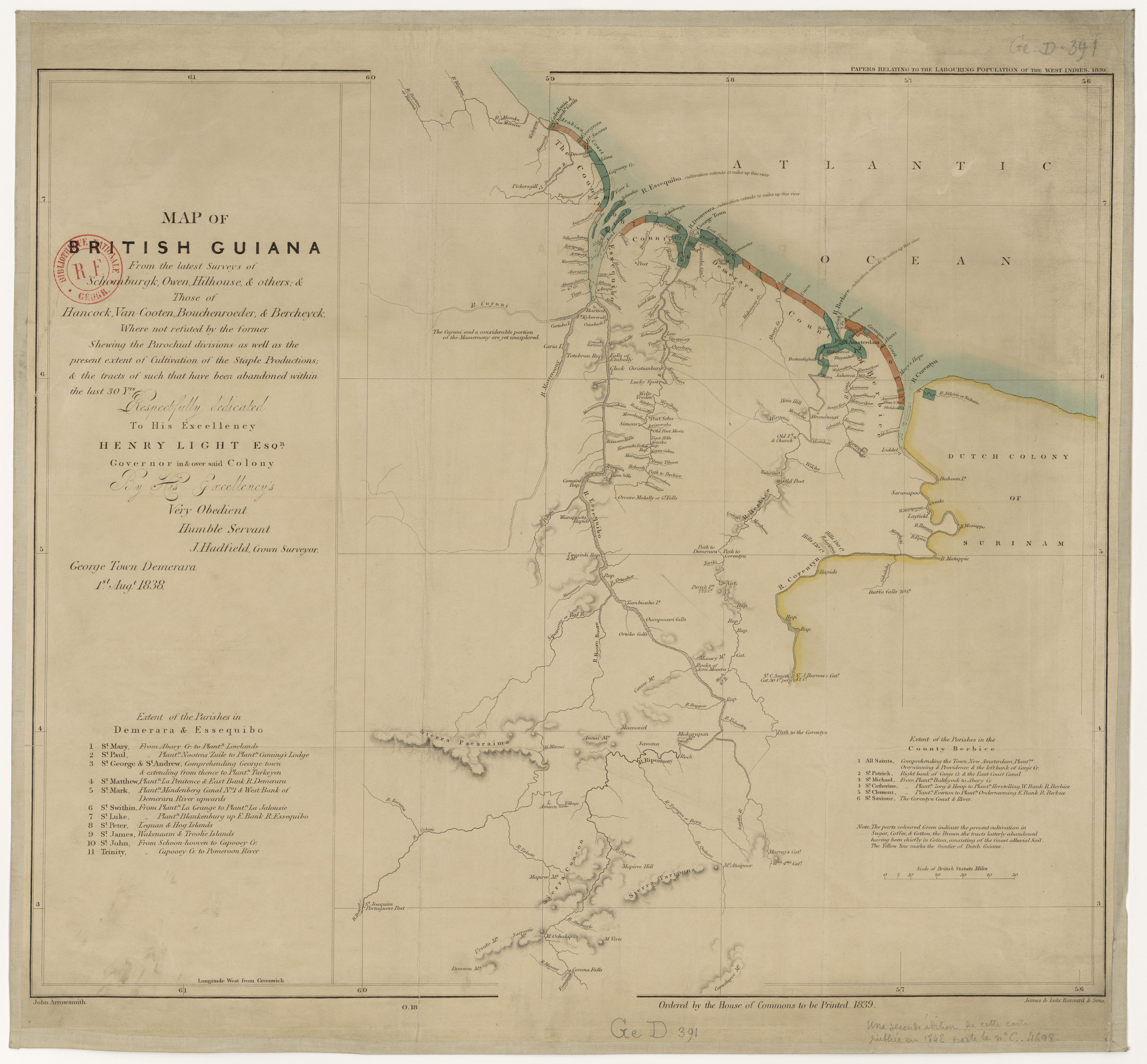
British Guiana in 1838 based on surveying ordered by Light

=== Apprenticeship and economy ===
Light assumed office on 27 June 1838 after his predecessor's death in March. Prefacing his 10-year-long term, Light stated:

A combination of labor, capital, and one directing head are necessary to make this colony flourish, without these, it will become a swamp, and the population retrograde to their original state of nature.

His initial observation was that the two estates were capable of producing more sugar than Nevis and Montserrat; he believed Berbice could obtain higher production than the Leeward and Windward Islands combined if provided adequate labor. Following the Slavery Abolition Act 1833, apprenticeship was established but was intended to be supplanted by emancipation on 1 August 1838. Smyth claimed the peace of the colony would rely on the 15 stipendiary magistrates as the black population would not allow a plantation owner-dominated judiciary; Light agreed and kept them, as permitted by the Colonial Office. He suggested to those in new African villages they form agreements with the management of plantations, which would be signed by stipendiary magistrates and shareholders. In one such agreement, non-Christian religious practices were banned, in line with suppression of obeah:

Obeah practices, mixed up with portions of scripture, and repetitions of prayer, have come to my notice within the last few months; they seem to pay so well, that no opening should be allowed to the knavish negro, to assume the sacerdotal power.

— Henry Light, 26 November 1840 dispatch to the Secretary of State for War and the Colonies

He was unconcerned for cultivation, citing the absence of labor for 3 weeks in Antigua in 1834 as reason to believe only temporary effects were imminent. In late August, he informed Secretary of State for War and the Colonies Charles Grant, 1st Baron Glenelg that Berbice plantations resumed operation after a short period of inactivity. He argued against plantation owners and entrepreneurs' claims that the new freedom hampered productivity, retorting that there was bad season, and harsh treatment led freedmen away. However, in October, he demanded freedmen 'give up a fair portion' of their labor, warning of eviction and replacement by immigrants if regular work was not committed. Grant's successor, Lord John Russell, viewed Light's work more critically. Russell aligned himself with the planters' blaming of emancipation, though disagreed about the supposed contribution by freedmen's behavior. He justified his position by bringing up a return from April 1839; shown were output comparisons between 6 July to 10 October 1839 with 1831 to 1833: sugar had decreased by 7,259 hogsheads, rum by 2,014 puncheons, and coffee by more than three-fourths in total. He also referred to the £930,000 decline in 1839 Demerara crop as calculated by the Liverpool West India Association. Ultimately, Russell believed parliament should further aid the colonies in dealing with the effects of emancipation and agreed with Light that interconnectivity between the classes was essential for mending the issues. Since emancipation, wealthy planters such as William Ewart Gladstone had attempted to get indentured servants from British India, provoking investigation reluctantly ordered by Light. These efforts were made in vain and when it was made legal in 1845, it was under conditions less favorable than in 1837. The last development on the issue was in 1860, when five-year contracts were able to be issued by the Indian administration; by then Indian indentured servants were integral and a governing concern of the Guiana administration.

=== General administration ===
In December 1838, Light told the Court of Policy that the government were 'possessors de facto of the soil' and that Native Guyanese would have to apply their territory for grants and pay fees to prevent it from being leased.

In accordance with Ordinance No. 3 of 1839 by the Lords Commissioners of the Treasury, the Dutch guilder was replaced by the British dollar, exchanging at a rate of 3 guilders per dollar. The ordinance took effect on 1 March.

Following emancipation, during the 1830s and 1840s, the prison system was expanded with primarily coastal district prisons. Light laid the first stone of Her Majesty’s Penal Settlement Mazaruni in 1842 and vouched for the humane conditions of the system. In 1848, controversies spurred out of testimonies of abuse and Light ordered an inquiry. One interviewee spoke of killings and beatings. In June 1842, he established the first rudimentary mental illness institution.

He sent £3,170 to the British Relief Association, claiming, "this colony is particularly blessed at the moment with the greatest abundance of every necessary of life [...] in no place in the world is a labourer so favoured as in this colony".

== Family ==
Light had three children with his wife Charlotte: Elizabeth Georgiana, Charlotte, and Alfred. Charlotte was unmarried and Alfred, born in Paris in 1823, obtained the rank of lieutenant colonel in the Royal Artillery, serving in British Raj, before retiring with the honorary rank of major general on 31 December 1878. He married Norah, widow of Charles Oxenden and daughter of Martin Gubbins, in 1871 and died in London on 31 September 1911. Elizabeth married William Henry Holmes, Esq., Provost Marshal of Guiana, at St. George's Cathedral, Georgetown on 15 April 1848 by the corresponding diocese's bishop. William died in 1868 and Elizabeth on 11 January 1897. He received the Order of the Bath from Queen Victoria in 1849. On 5 July 1865, Light received his pension for 12 years of governance at age 82. He died on 3 March 1870, a few hours after his wife, at age 87.

== See also ==
- Economy of Guyana
- Eric Whelpton, his grandson
- Essequibo (colony)
- Governor Light
- History of Guyana

== Sources ==
- Anderson, Clare; Moss, Kellie; Jackson, Shammane Joseph (2 October 2022). "Coloniality and the Criminal Justice System: Empire and its Legacies in Guyana". Slavery & Abolition. 43 (4): 682–704. doi:10.1080/0144039X.2022.2114637. S2CID 253671815 – via Taylor & Francis.
- Bulkan, Janette (2016). "'Original Lords of the Soil'? The Erosion of Amerindian Territorial Rights in Guyana". Environment and History. 22 (3): 351–391. doi:10.3197/096734016X14661540219276. ISSN 0967-3407. JSTOR 24810671.
- Colonial Office (1872–1881). "West Indian Nos. 23, 23A, 23B to 29 and 31 to 34". Confidential Print: North America. Adam Matthew Digital.
- Gramaglia, Letizia (2013). "Migration and Mental Illness in the British West Indies 1838–1900: The Cases of Trinidad and British Guiana". Migration, health and ethnicity in the modern world. New York. pp. 61–82. ISBN 978-1-137-30323-3 – via SpringerLink.
- Green, William A. (July 1969). "The Apprenticeship in British Guiana, 1834-1838". Caribbean Studies. 9 (2): 44–66. ISSN 0008-6533. JSTOR 25612128.
- Kale, Madhavi (1998). Fragments of Empire: Capital, Slavery, and Indian Indentured Labor in the British Caribbean. Philadelphia: University of Pennsylvania Press, Inc. ISBN 9780812202427 – via De Gruyter.
- Kale, Madhavi (2016). Nation and Migration: the Politics of Space in the South Asian Diaspora. Philadelphia, Pa.: University of Pennsylvania Press. ISBN 9781512807837 – via De Gruyter.
- O’Leary McNeice, Aoife (1 May 2022). ""A Painful and Tender Sympathy Pervaded Every Class of Society"". Radical History Review. 2022 (143). Duke University Press: 165–176. doi:10.1215/01636545-9566188. S2CID 249587203.
- Smith, Raymond T. (1976). The African diaspora: interpretive essays. Cambridge, Massasscheusetts: Harvard University Press. ISBN 9780674593220 – via De Gruyter.
- Thomas, Sue (1999). "The Tropical Extravagance of Bertha Mason". Victorian Literature and Culture. 27 (1): 1–17. doi:10.1017/S106015039927101X. ISSN 1060-1503. JSTOR 25058436. S2CID 162220216.
