= Belladrum =

- village
- Location within Guyana
- Coordinates: 6°30′6″N 57°42′5″W
- Country: Guyana
- region: Mahaica-Berbice

Population (2012)
  - Total: 777

Belladrum is a small community in the Mahaica-Berbice Region of Guyana, on the Atlantic coast, about 15 kilometres (9 mi) east of Mahaicony.

== Geography ==
Belladrum is a rural area close to the sea wall on the northern coast of Guyana. It is below sea level and is rich with lush vegetation, rice fields, and wildlife. Due to frequent seasonal flooding, it is particularly good for growing rice.

== Housing and employment ==
Housing is traditionally made of wood and stands on stilt-like columns. Recently houses made of concrete and breeze bloc are becoming more common. The people of Belladrum are very friendly and walk long distances in search of work. Historically the men of Belladrum would walk for miles daily to "dig shovel", digging canals and waterways in the cane fields or "cut cane" at the Bath or Blairmont sugar plantations.

Like many villages on Guyana's coastal plain Belladrum is laid out as a ribbon settlement with house lots on either side of the two-lane highway. Paved roads with shallow canals on either side are situated perpendicular to the public highway at the ends and middle of the village. Located south of the village is an area of land called the "backdam", consisting mainly of coconut trees and a variety of fruit trees interspersed. The trees are badly managed but very productive and serve as a source of income and food for many villagers. The coconuts are used for cooking or making oil. Some residents transport mangoes and other fruits from this area to the city, where they are sold at the Bourda or Stabroek market. In the backdam any particular plot of land and its vegetation is generally thought to be the property of the person or family directly north of the plot.

== Amenities ==
Belladrum has long served as a cultural and administrative hub to many people of the surrounding communities. Located here is the Village Office run by an Overseer which houses property and other records; a government Health Clinic; and several dance hall clubs, liquor stands, and grocery shops.

A Seventh-day Adventist church and St. Alban's Anglican church are located in Belladrum. The administrators of the Anglican church largely oversee the cemetery located in the same compound.

The Belladrum Primary School is located near the center of the village in the same compound as the St. Alban's Anglican Church. It was originally founded by the Anglican church, and was named the St Alban's School. Students come from villages roughly 2–3 miles along the public road and either side of the school (Plantation Profit to Weldaad Village). The Belladrum Nursery School which was formerly housed in the same building is now located in another part of the village. The Belladrum Secondary School, located in neighbouring Eldorado village, was formerly called the "Belladrum [Government] Community High School" due to an emphasis on vocational education rather than academic subjects.

A sub-office of the Guyana Elections Commission is located at Belladrum Secondary School.
