= Ellen and the Escapades =

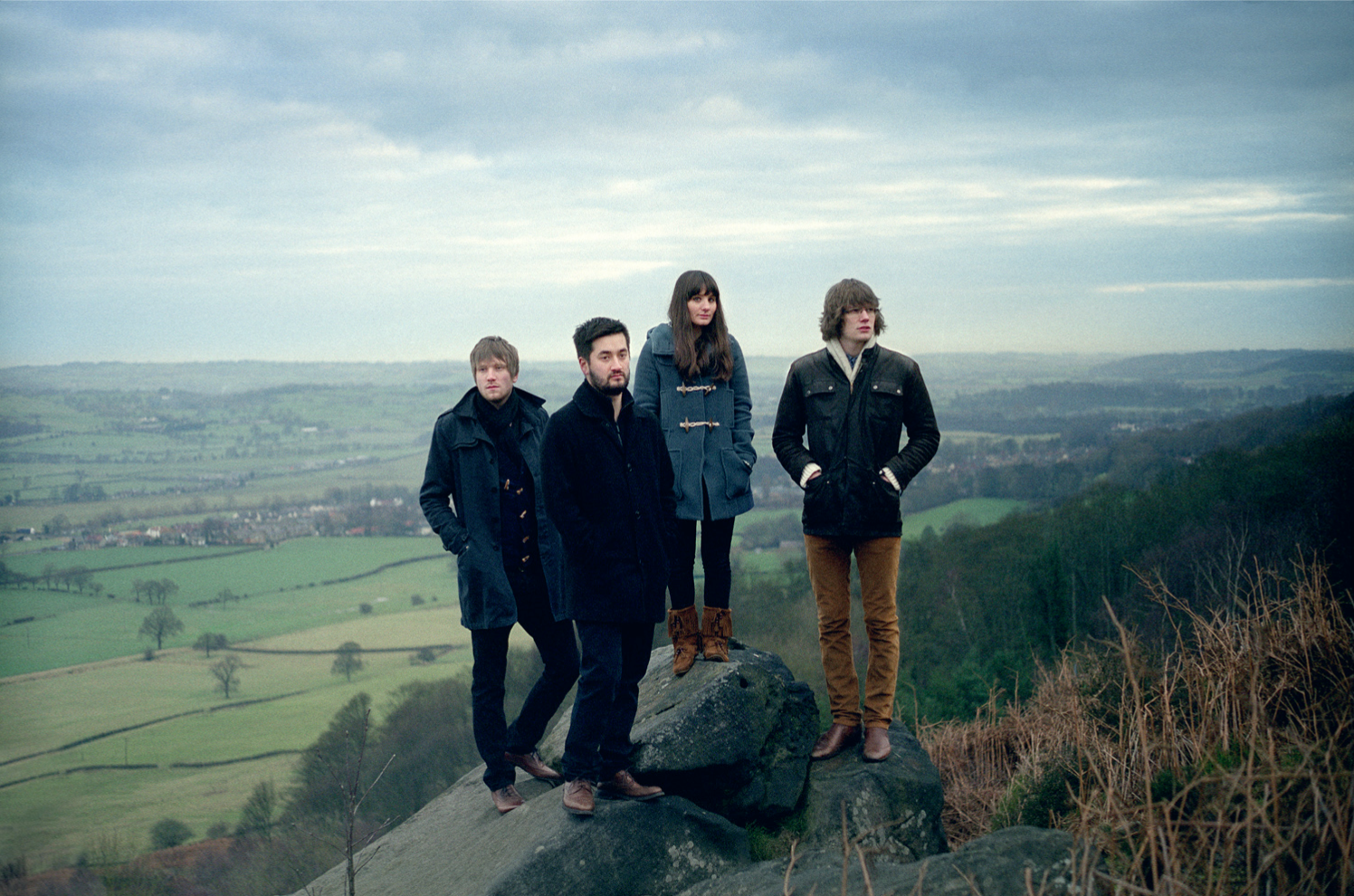
- Ellen and the Escapades

Background information
- Origin: Leeds, England / San Francisco, United States
- Genres: Acoustic, Pop rock
- Years active: 2009–2015

Ellen and the Escapades were an acoustic/pop/rock band from Leeds, England. In 2009, the band was chosen by BBC Introducing to perform at Reading Festival and Leeds Festival. The following year, Ellen and the Escapades won the Q Magazine/Glastonbury Emerging Talent Competition and performed on three of the festival's main stages.

The band received regular national radio play from BBC 6 Music and Amazing Radio. They have often also been played on BBC Radio 1 and BBC Radio 2, as well as on XFM. Ellen and the Escapades played on The Black Isle Brewery Grassroots Stage on Saturday 4 August at the 2012 Belladrum Tartan Heart Festival near Beauly, Inverness-shire.

In February 2015, the band announced via their Facebook page that they would be breaking up.

== Releases ==
- "All The Crooked Scenes" (Single) – 2 April 2012
- All The Crooked Scenes (Album) – 16 April 2012
- "Without You" (Single Album Version) – 21 October 2012
- "The Worlds Greatest" (Single) – 16 August 2012
- "Lost Cause" (Single) – 2 June 2014
