= List of shipwrecks in March 1839 =

The list of shipwrecks in March 1839 includes ships sunk, foundered, wrecked, grounded, or otherwise lost during March 1839.

== 1 March ==
List of shipwrecks: 1 March 1839
| Ship | State | Description |
|---|---|---|
| Flower | United Kingdom | The ship was driven ashore at Redcar, Yorkshire. She was later refloated and put into Hartlepool, County Durham. |
| Hope | United Kingdom | The smack struck a rock, capsized and sank off Milford Haven, Pembrokeshire with the loss of all hands. She was on a voyage from Southampton, Hampshire to Dublin. |
| Jeune Heloise | France | The ship was wrecked in the Amazon River. She was on a voyage from Marseille, Bouches-du-Rhône to a Brazilian port. |

== 2 March ==
List of shipwrecks: 2 March 1839
| Ship | State | Description |
|---|---|---|
| Mollers Minde | Denmark | The ship was sighted in the Great Belt whilst on a voyage from Nakskov to Jersey, Channel Islands. No further trace, presumed foundered with the loss of all hands. |
| Rowena | United Kingdom | The ship was driven ashore on Point Clynas, Anglesey. She was on a voyage from Liverpool, Lancashire to Sierra Leone. Rowena was refloated on 20 March and taken into Amlwch, Anglesey. |
| Three Brothers | United Kingdom | The ship was wrecked at Saint Thomas, Virgin Islands. |

== 4 March ==
List of shipwrecks: 4 March 1839
| Ship | State | Description |
|---|---|---|
| Christian and Maria | Norway | The ship foundered in the North Sea. Her crew were rescued. She was on a voyage from Dram to London, United Kingdom. |
| Grange | United Kingdom | The ship ran aground on the South Gar. She was on a voyage from Newcastle upon Tyne, Northumberland to New York, United States. Grange was refloated and put back to Newcastle upon Tyne. |
| Reform | United Kingdom | The ship was wrecked on the South Gar. Her crew were rescued. She was on a voyage from Sunderland, County Durham to Jersey, Channel Islands. |

== 6 March ==
List of shipwrecks: 6 March 1839
| Ship | State | Description |
|---|---|---|
| Jeune Maurice | France | The ship ran aground and capsized in the Garonne. She was on a voyage from Bordeaux, Gironde to an English port. Jeune Maurice was later refloated. |

== 7 March ==
List of shipwrecks: 7 March 1839
| Ship | State | Description |
|---|---|---|
| Ann | United Kingdom | The ship was driven ashore and wrecked at Hartlepool, County Durham. Her crew were rescued by the Hartlepool Lifeboat. She was on a voyage from Stockton-on-Tees, County Durham to London. |
| Enterprise | United Kingdom | The ship capsized and caught fire at Newcastle upon Tyne, Northumberland. She was towed out to sea and scuttled. Enterprise was later refloated and beached. |
| Herald | United Kingdom | The paddle steamer ran aground at Buckhouse Point, Carlingford, County Louth. She was on a voyage from Liverpool, Lancashire to Newry, County Antrim. Herald had become a wreck by 14 March. |
| Prince Regent | United Kingdom | The ship was driven ashore near St. Margarets Bay, Kent. She was on a voyage from Guernsey, Channel Islands to London. |
| Profit and Loss | United Kingdom | The ship was wrecked 3 nautical miles (5.6 km) east of Calais, France with the loss of all hands. |
| Two Brothers | Hamburg | The ship was driven ashore and wrecked at Cresswell, Northumberland with the loss of a crew member. She was on a voyage from Hamburg to Newcastle upon Tyne. |

== 8 March ==
List of shipwrecks: 8 March 1839
| Ship | State | Description |
|---|---|---|
| Douglas | United Kingdom | The brig was wrecked at Goswick, Northumberland with the loss of all hands. She was on a voyage from Newcastle upon Tyne, Northumberland to London. |
| Envoy | United States | The ship was wrecked on the coast of Tabasco, Mexico. She was on a voyage from New York to Laguna, Mexico. |
| Felicity | United Kingdom | The ship was wrecked on the Tuskar Rock. |
| John Mewer | Hamburg | The ship was driven ashore and wrecked at Cresswell, Northumberland with the loss of two of her crew. She was on a voyage from Hamburg to Newcastle upon Tyne. |

== 10 March ==
List of shipwrecks: 10 March 1839
| Ship | State | Description |
|---|---|---|
| Anna Karena | United Kingdom | The ship ran aground at Peterhead, Aberdeenshire, United Kingdom and was severely damaged. She was on a voyage from Porsgrund to Peterhead. |
| Countess of Mulgrave | United Kingdom | The ship was wrecked off Jamaica. She was on a voyage from Veracruz, Mexico to Jamaica. |
| George and Alexander | United Kingdom | The ship ran aground and was wrecked in the River Tay with the loss of all hands. She was on a voyage from Dundee, Forfarshire to the Eider. |
| Elizabeth and Alida | Netherlands | The ship was wrecked near Carne, Cornwall, United Kingdom. She was on a voyage from Amsterdam, North Holland to Liverpool, Lancashire, United Kingdom. |
| Wellington | United Kingdom | The ship ran aground on the Herd Sand, in the North Sea off the coast of County Durham. She was on a voyage from Aberdeen to South Shields, County Durham. Wellington was refloated the next day. |

== 11 March ==
List of shipwrecks: 11 March 1839
| Ship | State | Description |
|---|---|---|
| Despatch | United Kingdom | A fire in the Pacific Ocean (33°27′S 161°45′E) destroyed her. All 29 people on board successfully abandoned ship. Governor Bourke (United Kingdom) rescued eight people. The other 21 reached Lord Howe's Island in the long boat, where Woodlark rescued them. |
| Nelly | United Kingdom | The ship struck a sunken rock in Loch na h-Oidhche and sank. She was on a voyage from Belfast, County Antrim to Sunderland, County Durham. Nelly was later refloated. |
| Prince Coburg | United Kingdom | The ship foundered in the North Sea off Dimlington, Yorkshire. Her crew were rescued. She was on a voyage from Wisbech, Cambridgeshire to Leith, Lothian. |
| Princess Charlotte | United Kingdom | The ship foundered in the North Sea off Holmpton, Yorkshire. Her crew were rescued. She was on a voyage from Wisbech, Cambridgeshire to Leith. |
| Progress | United Kingdom | The brig was driven ashore at the Spanish Battery, South Shields, County Durham. Her crew were rescued by rocket apparatus. |
| Welcome | United Kingdom | The ship departed from Trinidad for Dublin. No further trace, presumed foundered in the Atlantic Ocean with the loss of all hands. |
| Wellington | United Kingdom | The ship ran aground on the Herd Sand, off the coast of County Durham. She was on a voyage from Aberdeen to South Shields. Wellington was refloated the next day and put into South Shields. |

== 12 March ==
List of shipwrecks: March 1839
| Ship | State | Description |
|---|---|---|
| Andrea Elizabeth | Norway | The ship was in collision with Hebrew (United States) and sank at Havre de Grâce, Seine-Inférieure, France. She was on a voyage from Christiansand to Havre de Grâce. |
| Buenos Ayres Packet | United Kingdom | The ship ran aground on the Corton Sand, in the North Sea off the coast of Suffolk and was severely damaged. She was on a voyage from Seaham, County Durham to London. Buenos Ayres Packet was refloated and made for Great Yarmouth, Norfolk, where she was driven ashore. Her crew were rescued. |
| Busy | United Kingdom | The ship was driven ashore and wrecked at Sunderland, County Durham. She was later refloated and taken into Sunderland. |
| Delaval | United Kingdom | The ship was driven ashore and wrecked at the Spanish Battery, South Shields, County Durham. Her five crew were rescued by rocket apparatus. |
| Progress | United Kingdom | The Master and ten seamen of the ship Progress, stranded at Tynemouth, were safely rescued. The storekeeper of Dennett's Rockets, T. Thorp, was awarded the RNLI Silver Medal, for his efforts in rescuing the crew. |
| Thomas Dougall | United Kingdom | The ship was driven ashore and wrecked at Occumster, Caithness with the loss of seven of her thirteen crew. She was on a voyage from Leith, Lothian to Odesa. |

== 13 March ==
List of shipwrecks: 13 March 1839
| Ship | State | Description |
|---|---|---|
| Fame | United Kingdom | The ship was driven ashore on Texel, North Holland, Netherlands. She was on a voyage from London to Harlingen, Friesland, Netherlands. Fame was refloated on 19 March and taken into Harlingen. |

== 14 March ==
List of shipwrecks: 14 March 1839
| Ship | State | Description |
|---|---|---|
| Air | United Kingdom | The schooner was driven ashore at Sunderland, County Durham. |
| Gem | United Kingdom | The ship ran aground in the River Suir. She was on a voyage from Bayonne, Basses-Pyrénées, France to Liverpool, Lancashire. |
| Lord Morpeth | United Kingdom | The ship was driven ashore and wrecked on the Spanish Battery. Her crew were rescued. She was on a voyage from Holbeach, Lincolnshire to South Shields, County Durham. |

== 15 March ==
List of shipwrecks: 15 March 1839
| Ship | State | Description |
|---|---|---|
| Berkeley | United Kingdom | The whaler was driven ashore and damaged in the Cocos Islands. She was subsequently repaired. |
| Gideon | United States | The whaler was wrecked in the Cocos Islands. |
| Johannes | Russia | The ship was driven ashore and wrecked at "Ketsveck". She was on a voyage from Lisbon, Portugal to Riga. |
| Lizzy | United Kingdom | The ship was driven ashore and wrecked at "Gupton". Her crew were rescued. She was on a voyage from an Irish port to Tenby, Pembrokeshire. |
| Haabets Anker | Norway | The galiot was beached at Hartlepool, County Durham, United Kingdom. She was on a voyage from Dram to Hartlepool. Haabets Anker was later refloated and taken into Hartlepool. |
| Hope | United Kingdom | The ship ran aground off Hartlepool. Her crew were rescued by the Hartlepool Lifeboat. She was on a voyage from Sunderland, County Durham to London Hope was refloated and taken into Hartlepool, where she sank. |
| Tranquille | France | The ship was wrecked near Le Croisic, Loire-Inférieure. |
| Troubadour | France | The ship was wrecked at Le Croisic. Her crew were rescued. She was on a voyage from Plymouth, Devon, United Kingdom to Nantes, Loire-Inférieure. |
| Victoria | United Kingdom | The ship ran aground on rocks near Roseau, Dominica. |

== 16 March ==
List of shipwrecks: 16 March 1839
| Ship | State | Description |
|---|---|---|
| Hebe | United Kingdom | The ship was wrecked near the Vows Rock, on the coast of Forfarshire. |
| Marida | Prussia | The ship was driven ashore and severely damaged on Læsø, Denmark. She was on a voyage from Memel to Bristol, Gloucestershire, United Kingdom. Merida was refloated on 16 April and towed into Copenhagen, Denmark. |
| Mary Ann and Caroline | United Kingdom | The ship was driven ashore in the River Mersey at Liverpool, Lancashire. She was on a voyage from Saint John, New Brunswick to Liverpool. |

== 17 March ==
List of shipwrecks: 17 March 1839
| Ship | State | Description |
|---|---|---|
| Alpha | United Kingdom | The ship ran aground on the Herd Sand, in the North Sea off the coast of County Durham. She was on a voyage from Newcastle upon Tyne, Northumberland to London. Alpha was later refloated and taken into South Shields, County Durham. |
| Ann | United Kingdom | The ship was driven ashore at Blyth, Northumberland. |
| Aurora | United Kingdom | The schooner foundered in the Atlantic Ocean (42°02′N 39°00′W) with the loss of three of her eleven crew. Survivors were rescued by the barque Indefatigable (United Kingdom). Aurora was on a voyage from London to Saint John, New Brunswick, British North America. |
| Bee | United Kingdom | The ship was driven ashore at Workington, Cumberland. |
| Billow | United States | The ship ran aground on the Man of War Shoals. She was on a voyage from La Rochelle, Charente-Maritime to Baltimore, Maryland. Billow was refloated the next day and resumed her voyage. |
| Christiana | United Kingdom | The ship was driven ashore at Port St. Mary, Isle of Man. She was on a voyage from Inverness to Liverpool. |
| Diligent | United Kingdom | The ship sank off Zuydcoote, Nord, France. She was on a voyage from Sunderland, County Durham to Rouen, Seine-Inférieure. |
| Drydens | United Kingdom | The ship struck the Stoney Binks and foundered off the mouth of the Humber. Her thirteen passengers and crew were rescued by Neptune (United Kingdom). |
| Hope | United Kingdom | The ship was driven ashore and wrecked near Hartlepool, County Durham. Her crew were rescued by the Hartlepool Lifeboat. She was on a voyage from Sunderland to London. |
| Jubilee | United Kingdom | The ship was wrecked on Juist, Kingdom of Hanover. Her crew were rescued. |
| Richard and John | United Kingdom | The collier was in collision with Leith (United Kingdom) and foundered in the North Sea. |
| Sarah | United Kingdom | The schooner was driven ashore near Llandulas, Denbighshire. Her crew were rescued. |
| Secret | United Kingdom | The ship was driven ashore at Port St. Mary. She was on a voyage from Newry, County Antrim to Glasson Dock, Lancashire. She was later refloated. |
| Ypens | Netherlands | The ship capsized in the North Sea with the loss of four of her seven crew. She was on a voyage from Harlingen, Friesland to Drøbak, Norway. Survivors were rescued by Nora (United Kingdom). |

== 18 March ==
List of shipwrecks: 18 March 1839
| Ship | State | Description |
|---|---|---|
| Cæsar | United Kingdom | The ship was lost off Green Key, Cuba. She was on a voyage from Montevideo, Uruguay to Havana, Cuba. |
| Dispatch | (United Kingdom of Great Britain and Ireland) Antigua | The drogher ran aground on the Belfast Reef. She was refloated but consequently sank. |
| Fame | United Kingdom | The ship was driven ashore on Texel, North Holland, Netherlands. She was on a voyage from London to Harlingen, Friesland, Netherlands. Fame was later refloated and taken into Harlingen. |
| Maria | United Kingdom | The ship ran aground on the Jadder Reef. She was on a voyage from Leith, Lothian to Pillau, Prussia. Maria was refloated the next day and put into a port. She subsequently proceeded on her voyage. |
| Sabina | United Kingdom | The ship ran aground on the Nore. She was on a voyage from St. Davids, Pembrokeshire to London. Sabina was later refloated and resumed her voyage. |

== 19 March ==
List of shipwrecks: 19 March 1839
| Ship | State | Description |
|---|---|---|
| Argus | United Kingdom | The ship ran aground in the Elbe. She was on a voyage from Hamburg to London. Argus was later refloated and towed into Cuxhaven. |
| Paoli | United States | The ship was driven ashore in the Scheldt. She was on a voyage from New York to Antwerp, Belgium. She was refloated the next day and proceeded to Antwerp. |

== 20 March ==
List of shipwrecks: 20 March 1839
| Ship | State | Description |
|---|---|---|
| Rebecca | (United Kingdom of Great Britain and Ireland) New South Wales | The sloop ran aground at Cape Portland, Tasmania during a gale. |

== 21 March ==
List of shipwrecks: 21 March 1839
| Ship | State | Description |
|---|---|---|
| Maria Catherine | Belgium | The ship was driven ashore at the mouth of the Scheldt, where she was subsequently wrecked. Her crew were rescued. She was on a voyage from Liverpool, Lancashire, United Kingdom to Antwerp. |

== 22 March ==
List of shipwrecks: 22 March 1839
| Ship | State | Description |
|---|---|---|
| Buchanan | United Kingdom | The ship ran aground in the Loire. |
| Jason | United Kingdom | The ship was driven ashore at King's Lynn, Norfolk. She was on a voyage from Seaham, County Durham to King's Lynn. |
| Watson | United Kingdom | The ship was wrecked on Skagen, Denmark. Her crew were rescued. She was on a voyage from Hull, Yorkshire to Riga, Russia. |

== 23 March ==
List of shipwrecks: 23 March 1839
| Ship | State | Description |
|---|---|---|
| Nancy Girvan | United Kingdom | The ship was abandoned off Cape Horn, Chile. Her crew were rescued by the whaler Gretry (France). She was on a voyage from Paranaguá, Brazil to Valparaíso, Chile. |
| Recovery | United Kingdom | The ship ran aground off Helsingborg, Sweden. She was on a voyage from London to Danzig. Recovery was refloated the next day and resumed her voyage. |
| Sonne | Rostock | The ship was driven ashore on "Amack Island". She was on a voyage from Rostock to Newcastle upon Tyne, Northumberland, United Kingdom. Sonne was refloated on 25 March and taken into Copenhagen, Denmark. |
| Tiberius | United Kingdom | The ship ran aground on the West Barrows, in the North Sea off the coast of Essex. She was on a voyage from Sunderland, County Durham to London. Tiberius was later refloated and proceeded on her voyage. |

== 25 March ==
List of shipwrecks: 25 March 1839
| Ship | State | Description |
|---|---|---|
| Emancipation | United Kingdom | The ship ran aground on the Sheep Key Bank. She was on a voyage from London to Havana, Cuba. Emancipationwas refloated on 28 March and towed into Nassau, Bahamas in a sinking condition. |
| Rebecca | (United Kingdom of Great Britain and Ireland) Van Diemen's Land | The ship was wrecked on a reef off Cape Portland. |

== 26 March ==
List of shipwrecks: 26 March 1839
| Ship | State | Description |
|---|---|---|
| Flamer | United Kingdom | The ship was driven ashore on Læsø, Denmark. She was on a voyage from Liverpool, Lancashire to Copenhagen, Denmark. She was refloated and resumed her voyage. |
| London | United Kingdom | The ship was driven ashore at Broadstairs, Kent. She was on a voyage from Newcastle upon Tyne, Northumberland to Broadstairs. London was later refloated and taken into Ramsgate, Kent. |
| Phillippine | Prussia | The ship sank at Copenhagen, Denmark. She was on a voyage from Rügenwalde to Hull, Yorkshire, United Kingdom. Phillippine was refloated on 8 April. |

== 27 March ==
List of shipwrecks: 27 March 1839
| Ship | State | Description |
|---|---|---|
| Defiance | United Kingdom | The ship ran aground on the Bondicar Rocks, Northumberland and was severely damaged. |
| Solace | United Kingdom | The ship was wrecked on a reef off the Isles of Scilly. Her crew were rescued. she was on a voyage from Lisbon, Portugal to Plymouth, Devon. |
| Tickler | United Kingdom | The ship ran aground at Weymouth, Dorset. She was on a voyage from London to Sydney, New South Wales. Tickler was refloated on 29 March and resumed her voyage. |

== 28 March ==
List of shipwrecks: 28 March 1839
| Ship | State | Description |
|---|---|---|
| Enterprise | United Kingdom | The ship was wrecked at Aberdyfi, Merionethshire. Her crew were rescued. She was on a voyage from London to Aberdyfi. |
| Lady Dundas | United Kingdom | The ship was driven ashore near Selsey, Sussex. She was later refloated. |
| Nicholas I | Danzig | The ship was wrecked on the north east coast of Bornholm, Denmark. She was on a voyage from Danzig to London. |
| Prince Regent | United Kingdom | The ship ran aground on the Hooper Sand, in the Bristol Channel. She was refloated and put into Llanelly, Glamorgan. |

== 29 March ==
List of shipwrecks: 29 March 1839
| Ship | State | Description |
|---|---|---|
| Clara | United Kingdom | The ship ran aground on the Hook Sand, in the English Channel. She was on a voyage from Seaham, County Durham to Guernsey, Channel Islands. Clara was later refloated and put into Poole, Dorset. |

== 30 March ==
List of shipwrecks: 30 March 1839
| Ship | State | Description |
|---|---|---|
| Agnes | United Kingdom | The sloop was driven ashore at Grenada and was later refloated. |
| Mary | United Kingdom | The ship ran aground off Abary, British Honduras. |
| Victoria | United Kingdom | The ship ran aground on the Cross Sand, in the North Sea off the coast of Norfolk and consequently foundered. Her crew were rescued. She was on a voyage from South Shields, County Durham to Fowey, Cornwall. |

== 31 March ==
List of shipwrecks: 31 March 1839
| Ship | State | Description |
|---|---|---|
| Britannia | (United Kingdom of Great Britain and Ireland) New South Wales | The brig was driven ashore and wrecked near Port Phillip. All on board were rescued. She was on a voyage from Port Phillip to Launceston, Van Diemen's Land. |
| Ellen | United Kingdom | The ship was driven ashore at Waterford. She was refloated on 15 April. |
| Janet Taylor | United Kingdom | The brig ran aground on the Roaring Middle Sand, in The Wash. She was on a voyage from King's Lynn, Norfolk to Grangemouth, Stirlingshire. Janet Taylor was later refloated and put resumed her voyage. |
| Jenny | United Kingdom | The ship ran aground in the River Foyle and capsized. |
| Letitia | United Kingdom | The ship was driven ashore in Tramore Bay. Her crew were rescued. She was on a voyage from Swansea, Glamorgan to Barrow-in-Furness, Lancashire. |
| Minerva | United Kingdom | The ship was wrecked near Drogheda, County Louth. with the loss of a crew member. She was on a voyage from Bangor to Dundalk, County Louth. |

== Unknown date ==
List of shipwrecks: Unknown date in March 1839
| Ship | State | Description |
|---|---|---|
| Adelaide | United Kingdom | The ship was driven ashore and severely damaged on Holm Island, Skye, Outer Hebrides. She was on a voyage from Arbroath, Forfarshire to Liverpool, Lancashire. Adelaide was refloated on 9 March and taken into Stornoway, Isle of Lewis. |
| Anna | United Kingdom | The ship was driven ashore near Liverpool. She was on a voyage from Marseille, Bouches-du-Rhône, France to Liverpool. Anna was refloated on 30 March and towed into Liverpool. |
| Aurora | United Kingdom | The ship was wrecked on "Fraque Island" before 16 March with the loss of two of her crew. She was on a voyage from Gonaïves, Haiti to Liverpool. |
| Cupid | United Kingdom | The ship was wrecked on Amrum, Duchy of Holstein before 15 March. She was on a voyage from Riga, Russia to Hull, Yorkshire. |
| David Witton | United Kingdom | The brig was wrecked in the Onkaparinga River, South Australia. |
| Drie Gebroeders | Netherlands | The ship foundered in the Dogger Bank before 26 March. Her crew were rescued. She was on a voyage from Newcastle upon Tyne, Northumberland to Christiansand, Norway and Amsterdam, North Holland. |
| Earl of Seafield | United Kingdom | The ship was driven ashore at Aberdeen. She was on a voyage from Peterhead, Aberdeenshire to Aberdeen. Earl of Seafield was refloated on 9 March. |
| Earl Moira | United Kingdom | The ship was driven ashore at A Coruña, Spain before 1 April. |
| Ephenson | United Kingdom | The ship was driven ashore at North Somercotes, Lincolnshire. She was on a voyage from London to Sunderland, County Durham. Ephenson was refloated on 21 March and taken into Grimsby, Lincolnshire. |
| Ewretta | United Kingdom | The ship was driven ashore on the coast of Yorkshire. She was on a voyage from Hull to New York. Ewretta was later refloated and taken into Hull. |
| Fils Unis | France | The ship was driven ashore neat The Needles, Isle of Wight, United Kingdom. She was on a voyage from Bordeaux, Gironde to Exeter, Devon, United Kingdom. Fils Unis was refloated on 21 March and taken into Cowes, Isle of Wight. |
| Fortuna | Norway | The ship foundered in the North Sea on or before 23 March with the loss of two of her crew. She was on a voyage from Tønsberg to Fisherrow, Aberdeenshire, United Kingdom. |
| F. Society | United Kingdom | The ship ran aground on the Bahamas Bank. She was on a voyage from London to Havana, Cuba. She was subsequently refloated with assistance from Seaflower (United Kingdom). |
| Hazard | United Kingdom | The ship was abandoned in the North Sea on or before 19 March. |
| Jason | United Kingdom | The ship was driven ashore at Maryport, Cumberland. She was later refloated and taken into Maryport. |
| Johanna | Rostock | The ship was driven ashore on Saltholm, Denmark. She was on a voyage from Rostock to London, United Kingdom. Johanna was refloated on 24 March and taken into Helsingør, Denmark. |
| Lord Morpeth | United Kingdom | The ship was driven ashore at the Spanish Battery, South Shields, County Durham. She was refloated on 16 March and taken into South Shields. |
| Marseillais | France | The ship sprang a leak and was abandoned in the Mediterranean Sea 16 leagues (48 nautical miles (89 km)) south east of Mallorca, Spain on or before 3 March. She was on a voyage from Marseille, Bouches-du-Rhône to "Bougla". |
| Minna | United Kingdom | The ship ran aground on the Drooghen. She was on a voyage from Pillau, Prussia to Leith, Lothian. Minna was refloated on 9 March and taken into Helsingør, Denmark. |
| Pauline | United Kingdom | The ship was driven ashore at Ostend, West Flanders, Belgium. She was on a voyage from Liverpool to Ostend. |
| Treue | Flag unknown | The ship was driven ashore in Kroge Bay. She was refloated on 30 March and taken into Copenhagen, Denmark. |
| Triton | Norway | The ship capsized off "Brassa Head" between 18 and 30 March. she was on a voyage from Holmestrand to Wick, Caithness, United Kingdom. Triton was towed into Lerwick, Shetland Islands in a capsized state on 30 March. |
