= Governor Light =

- Village
- Location in Guyana
- Coordinates: 6°27′N 57°47′W
- Country: Guyana
- Region: Mahaica-Berbice

Population (2012)
  - Total: 11
- Time zone: UTC-4
- Climate: Af

Governor Light is a small community in the Mahaica-Berbice Region of Guyana. It stands on the coastal plain, at just one metre above sea-level, along the Mahaicony River, approximately 14 kilometres upstream from its mouth. Governor Light is named after Henry Light, the 3rd Governor of British Guiana.
