= Weldaad =

- Village
- Location in Guyana
- Coordinates: 6°29′15″N 57°41′0″W
- Country: Guyana
- Region: Mahaica-Berbice

Population (2012)
  - Total: 285
- Time zone: UTC-4
- Climate: Af

Weldaad is a community in the Mahaica-Berbice region of Guyana on the Atlantic Ocean coast. It contains the area's post office and a police station. The origin of the name comes from the plantation Weldaad, which was founded when the areas that make up Guyana were Dutch colonies.
