= Jonestown, Mahaica =

Jonestown, Mahaica Voorzigtigheid
- Village
- Location in Guyana
- Coordinates: 6.68442°N 57.91753°W
- Country: Guyana
- Region: Demerara-Mahaica

Population (2012)
  - Total: 572
- Time zone: UTC-4
- Climate: Af

Jonestown is a village in the Demerara-Mahaica region of Guyana. The old name of the village was Voorzigtigheid. The village is located 37.5 kilometres (24 miles) from Georgetown between Hand-en-Veldt and the Atlantic Ocean, and near the town of Mahaica. Therefore, it tends to be called "Jonestown, Mahaica" or "Jonestown, Mahaica, ECD", even today, although by current Guyanese administrative regions it is in Demerara-Mahaica.

Lewis Osborne Inniss, the Trinidadian writer and folklorist (a druggist, by profession), was born in Jonestown in 1848.

Jonestown, together with nearby areas along the lower courses of the Mahaica and other rivers of northeastern Guyana, has suffered from flooding during the wet season in the early years of the 21st century.

This Jonestown is not to be confused with the Jonestown of the 1978 mass murder-and-suicide by members of the Peoples Temple. Although that short-lived Jonestown was also in Guyana, it was in a different part of the country. The two places share their name by happenstance and have no other ties.
