= Guyana Sugar Corporation =

Guyanese sugar company

GUYSUCO
- Type: Agricultural and Processing
- Industry: Sugar
- Founded: 1976
- Headquarters: La Bonne Intention (LBI Sugar Estate), Guyana
- Products: Sugar
- Revenue: $200 million +
- Website: www.guysuco.com

The Guyana Sugar Corporation, or GuySuCo, is a Guyanese sugar company owned by the government. It is the country's largest cultivator and producer of sugar, a historically important commodity in the country. They produce Demerara Sugar for export around the world.

== History ==
The company was formed in 1976, when the government of Guyana nationalised and merged the sugar estates operated by Booker Sugar Estates Limited and Jessels Holdings to form the Guyana Sugar Corporation.

GuySuCo initially lacked needed experience and lacked the reserves of foreign capital required to maintain sugar plantations and processing mills during economically difficult periods. When production fell, GuySuCo became increasingly dependent on state support to pay the salaries of its 20,000 workers. During this time, the industry was hard-hit by labor unrest directed at the government of Guyana. A four-week strike in early 1988 and a seven-week strike in 1989 contributed to the low harvests. After disease wiped out much of the sugarcane crop in the early 1980s, farmers switched to a disease-resistant but less productive variety. Extreme weather in the form of both droughts and floods, especially in 1988, also led to smaller harvests.

=== Pricing and competition ===
Guyana exported about 85 percent of its annual sugar output, making sugar the largest source of foreign exchange. But the prospects for sugar exports grew less favorable during the 1980s. Rising production costs after nationalization, along with falling world sugar prices since the late 1970s, placed Guyana in an increasingly uncompetitive position. A 1989 Financial Times report estimated production costs in Guyana at almost US$400 per ton, roughly the same as world sugar prices at that time. By early 1991, world sugar prices had declined sharply to under US$200 per ton. Prices were expected to continue decreasing as China, Thailand, and India boosted sugar supplies to record high levels.

In the face of such keen international competition, Guyana grew increasingly dependent on its access to the subsidized markets of Europe and the United States. The bulk of sugar exports (about 160,000 tons per year in the late 1980s) went to the European Economic Community (EEC) under the Lomé Convention, a special quota arrangement. In 1987, the EEC price of sugar was about US$460 per ton, whereas the world price was only US$154 per ton. Guyana was allowed to sell a much smaller amount of sugar (about 18,000 tons per year in 1989, down from 102,000 tons in 1974) in the United States market at prices comparable to those in the EEC under another quota arrangement, the Caribbean Basin Initiative. Maintaining preferential access to the European market was a priority in Guyana; in 1988 and 1989, production levels were too low to satisfy the EEC quota, so Guyana imported sugar at low prices and reexported it to the lucrative European market. Even so, Guyana fell 35,000 tons short of filling the quota in 1989 and 13,000 tons short in 1990.

=== Restructuring ===
The government of Guyana restructured the sugar industry in the mid-1980s to restore its profitability. The area dedicated to sugar production was reduced from 50,000 hectares to under 40,000 hectares, and two of ten sugarcane-processing mills were closed. GuySuCo also diversified into production of dairy products, livestock, citrus, and other items. Profitability improved, but production levels and export earnings remained well below target. In mid-1990, the government took an important step toward long-term reform of the sugar industry when GuySuCo signed a management contract with the British firms Booker and Tate & Lyle, former owners of GuySuCo's assets. A study by the two companies reportedly estimated that US$20 million would be needed to rehabilitate Guyana's sugar industry.

In 2004 it was announced that the Guyana was moving to modernize its sugar industry to better handle competition from the world market. As part of a strategic plan to reduce costs and improve productivity, the GuySuCo and the China National Technology Import and Export Corporation signed contracts on June 22, 2004 in Beijing. As a result of the $110 million agreement which was partly funded by the World Bank, International Monetary Fund and the Exim Bank of China, a new factory was built, which included the Skeldon Sugar cogeneration plant, a distillery and a refinery to be constructed at a later stage in 2008. The agreement was also made in compliance with the World Bank targets and obligations to contribute to an overall reduction of global greenhouse gases and to introduce modern technologies to the sugar industry which would improve efficiency. In November 2007, sugar factory workers of GuySuCo trained in South Africa to become familiar with the new technology.

== See also ==
- Agriculture in Guyana
- History of sugar
