= Burma, Guyana =

Burma
- Village
- Location in Guyana
- Coordinates: 6°27′50″N 57°45′35″W
- Country: Guyana
- Region: Mahaica-Berbice

Population (2012)
  - Total: 137
- Time zone: UTC-4
- Climate: Af

Burma is a rice-producing village on the Atlantic Ocean coast of Guyana, situated on the East Coast Demerara, 65 km (40 mi) east of Georgetown. It houses the Burma Rice Development Station and the Mahaicony-Abary Rice Development milling complex.
