= Esau and Jacob =

- Village
- Location in Guyana
- Coordinates: 6.4093°N 57.7935°W
- Country: Guyana
- Region: Mahaica-Berbice

Population (2012)
  - Total: 154
- Time zone: UTC-4
- Climate: Af

Esau and Jacob is a village in the Mahaica-Berbice Region of Guyana. One of the oldest villages on the Mahaicony River, Esau and Jacob was named by Dutch settlers after the pair of twins in the Bible.

It is 11 kilometres (6.8 mi) south of the East Coast Highway, and is accessible by road. Economic activities are mostly agricultural, such as rice, cash crops, cattle and poultry. Pure Harvest Inc Rice Mill and Trans Rice Milling Complex are two major employers. The area is subject to flooding, depending on proper irrigation systems during heavy rains.

The village used to have a primary school (Easu and Jacob Primary School), but it is currently closed because there were not enough children, so Mortice Primary School is the main primary school for children of this village. Mortice also has the nearest Hindu temple. 'Wash Clothes' is the name of another nearby settlement. In 2020, Guyana Water Incorporated installed potable water pipes in the village. Before this, residents either purchased bottled drinking water or obtained it from the Mahaicony river.

Legend of the village says it was owned by two Afro-Guyanese, but the contemporary demographics are predominantly Indo-Guyanese.
