= Fort Wellington, Guyana =

Fort Wellington
- Village and regional capital
- Location within Guyana
- Coordinates: 6°24′0″N 57°37′0″W
- Country: Guyana
- Region: Mahaica-Berbice

Population (2012)
  - Total: 118
- Time zone: UTC-4

Fort Wellington is a village located in the Mahaica-Berbice region of Guyana, serving as its regional capital.

It is located on the west coast of Berbice and about 54 miles from Georgetown. Public services include Fort Wellington Hospital, a primary school, a secondary school, a police station, a magistrate's court, a National Insurance Scheme office, a Guyana Elections Commission Office and a post office.

Government administration and agriculture are major economic activities of the town. In 2017, two students of University of Guyana performed a feasibility study for growing onions in Guyana in conjunction with a Canadian agricultural organization.

The town has few supermarkets and grocery stores so villagers travel to Bushlot some distance away for supplies.

== History ==
The village was given the name for the fort that was in the site of the previous police station. It was given by the surveyor, T.R. Earl who demarcated it between Onderneeming Village to the west and Naarstigheid, an unpopulated area which was once a Dutch plantation, to the east. The town was built on the plantation Catherinas Lust.

The St Michael's Anglican Church was established in 1830 by English planters who lived at the Bath Estate, and when construction was completed in 1842, it was the only Anglican Church in West Berbice.
