= Catherinas Lust =

Catherina's Lust
- Estate
- Location in Guyana
- Coordinates: 6.333333°N 57.583333°W
- Country: Guyana
- Region: Demerara-Mahaica

Population (2012)
  - Total: 85
- Time zone: UTC-4
- Climate: Af

Catherinas Lust is an estate (large agricultural landholding) located approximately 13.8 km from the town of Fort Wellington in the Mahaica-Berbice region of Guyana in South America. It is listed as a village in the 2012 census.

It is also the name of a housing scheme Catherina's Lust, South.
