= Mora Point =

Village in Guyana

- Village
- Location in Guyana
- Coordinates: 6.4349°N 57.7850°W
- Country: Guyana
- Region: Demerara-Mahaica

Population (2012)
  - Total: 153
- Time zone: UTC-4
- Climate: Af

Mora Point, on the Mahaicony River in the Mahaica-Berbice, Guyana, is a village located 18 km south of the East Coast Highway. Mora Point contains a Health Centre, Karamat Primary School and Mora Point Nursery School.
