= Shana Yardan =

Guyanese poet (1943–1989)

- Born: 10 April 1943; Mahaicony, British Guiana
- Died: 2 November 1989 (aged 46); New York City, New York, U.S.
- Education: University of Guyana
- Occupation: Poet
- Writing career
- Notable work: The Listening Eyes

Shana Yardan (10 April 1943 – 2 November 1989) was a Guyanese poet and broadcaster, whose work contributed to wider understanding of experiences of Guyanese women, the impact of British colonialism and the natural world.

== Biography ==
Yardan was born on 10 April 1943 in Mahaicony, Guyana. She attended St. John Baptist School in Bartica and St. Joseph High School in Georgetown. She began to write poetry in the late 1960s, and she was published for the first time in An Anthology of Voices of Guyana, which was edited by Donald Trotman. In 1972 she and other Guyanese women poets published Guyana Drums, an anthology of their works. She subsequently published a volume of poetry in 1976, entitled The Listening of Eyes. During the 1970s she became a member of the Messenger Group, a collective of Guyanese artists seeking greater recognition of the contributions of Indo-Guyanese people to the country's literature. Around the same time she also studied for a degree at the University of Guyana, as well as working for the Guyana Broadcasting Corporation. She died in New York from cancer on 2 November 1989.

== Reception ==
Selwyn Cudjoe described The Listening of Eyes as "accomplished, tough-minded and well-crafted". In 1980 Yardan was described as the "most important woman poet in Guyana" by Arthur J. Seymour. Her poetry explored themes such as gender inequality and discrimination, as well as love and the natural world. She addressed her Indo-Guyanese heritage and the impact of colonialism in her work; one such poem is Earth Is Brown. This piece also deals with the legacies of being the descendant of indentured Indian servants. Other works addressed kala pani – the idea that Hindus are prohibited from crossing seas and oceans.
