= Abary =

- Location in Guyana
- Coordinates: 6°33′N 57°45′W
- Country: Guyana
- Region: Mahaica-Berbice

Population (2012)
  - Total: 110
- Climate: As

Abary is a small community in the Mahaica-Berbice Region of Guyana, near the mouth of the Abary River, 43 miles (69 km) from Georgetown. Abary is known for the Abary Bridge located on the Main Highway. The bridge was originally a railway bridge with a very steep grade. The bridge was designed by Joseph Walter Holder who also built the Demerara Harbour Bridge.
