= Mahaica =

- Location within Guyana
- Coordinates: 6°41′2″N 57°55′18″W
- Country: Guyana
- Region: Demerara-Mahaica

Population
  - Total: 4,867

Mahaica is a village located in region 4 of Demerara-Mahaica in Guyana. Mahaica is often used as a subregion for the adjoining villages near the Mahaica River like Hand-en-Veldt, Good Hope, Chelsey Park, and Jonestown, which is often referred to as Mahaica or its old Dutch plantation name Voorzigtigheid.

The economy of the region is dependent on rice and other agriculture.

Historically, Mahaica was considered a village, about 25 miles from Georgetown. It was a Wesleyan Methodist parish.

== Notable people ==
David Rose (Guyanese politician), the 2nd Governor-General of Guyana, grew up in Mahaica.
