= Mahaicony River =

- Location within Guyana

Location
- Country: Guyana

Physical characteristics
- Mouth: Atlantic Ocean
  - location: Mahaicony
  - coordinates: 6°34′N 57°48′W

The Mahaicony River is a small river in northern Guyana that drains into the Atlantic Ocean. Mahaicony village is found at the mouth of the river.

Farming and cattle rearing are the predominant human use of the lower reaches of the river. Sea defenses were built to protect the area from coastline erosion tangent to the river. Spring tides and heavy rains can deteriorate the natural mangrove defenses or man-built dams, which affects nearby settlements of Mahaicony, Content, and Dantzig. There is a koker at Mora Point for diverting water into the Jagdeo canal, and Mahaica-Mahaicony-Abary/-Agricultural Development Authority (MMA/ADA) Phase Two is a proposed conservancy project for additional drainage.

== Settlement ==
Ninety-six miles up the river is the village of Moraikobai. The river is an important transportation hub for the community.

Esau and Jacob is another riverside settlement.

== See also ==
- List of rivers of Guyana
- List of rivers of the Americas by coastline
