= Eric Whelpton =

British writer and traveller

- Born: Eric George Whelpton; 21 March 1894; Le Havre, France
- Died: 13 February 1981 (aged 86); Hastings, England
- Occupations: Reporter, author poet, teacher
- Spouse(s): Catherine Elsie Marian Barnes (1924); Barbara Crocker
- Writing career
- Genre: Travel

Eric George Whelpton (21 March 1894 – 13 February 1981) was a British writer, teacher and traveller.

== Early life and education ==
Whelpton was born on 21 March 1894 in Le Havre, France, the son of the Revd George Whelpton, minister of Trinity Methodist Church, Abingdon-on-Thames, Berkshire and Georgina Elizabeth Holmes (died 1897). His maternal grandfather was Sir Henry Light Governor of British Guiana from 1838 to 1848.

He attended a small Paris school and lived in Passy before the family moved to England in 1906. He attended Abingdon School from 1906 until 1909. From Abingdon he went to the Leys School, Cambridge before entering Hertford College, Oxford in 1913. His education was interrupted when he served during World War I.

== Career ==
Whelpton taught English at Ecole Des Roches and ran an office for the interchange of pupils and teachers, together with Dorothy L. Sayers. In 1920 he then moved and bought an estate agency in Florence and later worked in a girls' school and started a weekly newspaper called the Italian Mail. He taught at Christ Church Cathedral School. At the University of Oxford, Whelpton became a close friend of Sayers, and was one of the models for the character of Lord Peter Wimsey in her detective novels. Whelpton later taught French at King's College School, London, and was reader in comparative education at King's College London (1931–42). Following the death of her husband, Dorothy Sayers acted as Whelpton's literary secretary. During World War II, Whelpton worked as a BBC news correspondent in France and, as recounted in his travel book, The Balearics: Majorca, Minorca, Ibiza, he was told by a Swiss correspondent that he was on the Gestapo blacklist.

His last two books, The Making of a European (1974) and The Making of an Englishman (1977), are largely autobiographical.

== Personal life ==
From 1943 he was married to the artist and travel writer Barbara Crocker who illustrated a number of his books.

== Bibliography ==
- The Book of Dublin (1948)
- The Intimate Charm of Kensington (1948)
- Paris To-Day, with a gazetteer of places of interest and entertainment (Rockliff, 1948)
- By Italian Shores (1950)
- The Balearics: Majorca, Minorca, Ibiza (Robert Hale, 1952)
- Springtime at St. Hilaire (Museum Press, 1953)
- Dalmatia (1954)
- The Road to Nice (1955)
- Summer at San Martino (with Barbara Whelpton; Hutchinson, 1956)
- Grand Tour of Italy (1956)
- Calabria and the Aeolian Islands (1957)
- Paris Cavalcade (1959)
- Sicily, Sardinia and Corsica (with Barbara Whelpton; Robert Hale,1960)
- Greece & the Islands (1961)
- Southern Spain (with Chapters on the Algarve) (1964)
- A Concise History of Italy (1965)
- Florence and Tuscany (1965)
- Venice and North-Eastern Italy (1965)
- Normandy and Brittany (holiday guides) (1965)
- Eric Whelpton's Gastronomic Guide to Unknown France (1966)
- Paris (1967)
- Rome (1968)
- The Italian Lakes & Dolomites (Collins holiday guides) (1969)
- The Fall, the Reign and the Eclipse of Rome: History of Europe, 476-1530 (1970)
- The Austrians (How They Live & Work) (1970)
- AA Road Book of France (with gazetteer, itineraries, maps and town plans) (foreword, 1970)
- The Making of a European (1974)
- The Making of an Englishman (1977)

== See also ==
- List of Old Abingdonians
