= Barbara Crocker =

British artist

- Born: 1910; London, England
- Died: 1995 (aged 84–85); Rye, East Sussex, England
- Education: Slade School of Fine Art
- Known for: Painting, book illustration
- Spouse(s): Eric Whelpton, m. 1943–1981, his death

Barbara Fanny Crocker, later Barbara Crocker Whelpton, (1910–1995) was a British author and artist known for her paintings and murals.

== Biography ==
Crocker was born in London, one of the five children born to George Ashcombe Crocker, a dealer, and his wife Rosa Anna Francis. She attended Putney High School before studying at the Slade School of Fine Art in London from 1927 to 1930 after which she continued her training in Paris and Italy. As well as painting, Crocker lectured on art, including to troops during World War II, and, later, travelled extensively in Europe, Russia and the Middle East which resulted her writing several travel books. She painted landscapes in both oils and watercolours and produced prints and lithographs. She completed a number of murals for offices and restaurants in London and also for the Natural History Museum. Crocker illustrated a number of books including at least two for works by Eric Whelpton, who she had married in 1943 and together they wrote a number of books on art and travel. Crocker also translated a number of works by other authors.

From 1960 Crocker held annual studio shows of her work and also exhibited with the London Group, the Women's International Art Club, the Royal Watercolour Society and with the Royal Society of British Artists and the Society of Women Artists. For the later part of her life she lived in Sussex and died at Rye in 1995, aged 85. Canada House in London, the New York Museum and Rye Art Gallery all hold examples of her paintings.

== Books illustrated ==
- L'Air de Londres by Jean Queval
- The Book of Dublin by Eric Whelpton
- The Intimate Charm of Kensington by Eric Whelpton.

== Books written ==
- Springtime at St. Hilaire, 1953, with Eric Whelpton
- A Window on Greece, 1954
- Grand tour of Italy, 1956, with Eric Whelpton
- Calabria and the Aeolian Islands, 1957, with Eric Whelpton
- Greece and the Islands, 1962, with Eric Whelpton
- Paris Triumphant, 1962
- Unknown Ireland: A Motoring Itinerary of Lesser-known General and Archaeological Features, 1964
- Unknown Austria Volume 1 and Volume 2, 1966
- Unknown Austria: Styria, Burgenland and Carinthia, 1969
- Art Appreciation Made Simple, 1970
- Painters' Florence, 1971
- Unknown Scily; archaeological itineraries with 16 photos, 1972, with Georges Pillement
- Talking about Pictures: French, 1986, with Edward S Jenkins
- Picture Composition: French, 1986, with Edward S Jenkins.
