= 2005 Georgetown flood =

Natural disaster in Guyana

- Date: 15 January – 25 February 2005
- Location: Guyana
- Cause: The Intertropical Convergence Zone
- Deaths: 34
- Property damage: US$500,000,000

The 2005 Georgetown flood (also referred to as the Great Flood) was a major flood in and around Georgetown, the capital of Guyana. It started during heavy rains in 2004, and came to a head in January, when sustained heavy rains and high tides over-topped the deteriorating water conservancy. Approximately 290,000 people (39% of Guyana's population) were affected and the economic impact was estimated to be about US$465 million, or 59% of Guyana's GDP.

== Background ==
Guyana's population resides mostly along the Atlantic coast, in a coastal strip below mean sea level. The population centers along the coast is locked between the Atlantic Ocean (north) and a series of storage reservoirs (conservancies) to the south. Flood waters are drained via a complex drainage system either by pumping, or at low tide; when the sea level is low enough to allow for gravity-based release through a number of sluices. Guyana has two rainfall seasons, triggered by the north–south movement of the Intertropical Convergence Zone: one from April to July, and secondary season from November to February.

Starting in late December 2004, Guyana was hit by heavy rains. Flooding is not uncommon in the lowland coastal areas, and flooding was reported in areas such as Ogle and Sophia well into January.

The Multi-satellite Precipitation Analysis at NASA monitored rainfall between 24 December 2004 and 20 January 2005. The "highest rainfall totals on the order of 20 inches of rain (red areas) occur just offshore and right along the coastline of Guyana near the mouth of the Essequibo River and Georgetown". The three distinct episodes of rainfall "resulted in some coastal areas of Guyana receiving upwards of 100 cm (40 inches) of rainfall—the most rainfall for a similar period in over 100 years".

== Meteorological synopsis ==
Between 24 December 2004 and 20 January 2005, three distinct rainfall episodes occurred, which resulted in some coastal areas of Guyana receiving over 100 cm (39 in) of rain. The first rainfall episode occurred during December 2004, when torrential rainfall caused serious flooding along Guyana's coastal region. Over the next

== Critical mass ==
On 15 January hundreds of residents of Georgetown woke up to floodwaters seeping into their homes. East Demerara Water Conservancy was unable to contain the water and flood waters peaked around 17 January when a high Lunar tide and unusually heavy rains hit the area. The water conservancy was overloaded, and local drainage systems were inadequate to bear any additional burden. Regions 3, 4, and 5 were the most severely affected, and declared disaster areas by the government of Guyana. Overnight, in the city and in coastal communities, thousands were forced to flee their homes. Some took shelter in multi-storey hotels, where rooms were all booked in a matter of hours and close to 5,000 people stayed in temporary shelters. The flood event saw the deployment of the British charity Royal National Lifeboat Institution (RNLI) Flood Rescue team with x6 boats and 30 volunteers led by Owen Medland of the RNLI. Under the UK Department of International Development the team were supported and accommodated by the Guyana Defence Forces.

After 19 January, there was lull in rainfall, which allowed a significant amount of water to drain off higher grounds but many areas were still flooded. Within days, floodwaters had overflowed canals, many of which were clogged with silt and garbage. Kokers were jammed and inoperable, resulting in floodwaters, which by this time had overwhelmed drinking and wastewater management systems, being unable to escape. Additionally, all manners of sewage, from septic tanks to pit latrines, were considered 100% flooded. Agricultural Healthcare was limited as hospitals were also subject to the flooding. Rains continued until the first week of February 2005, but floodwaters receded slowly and damage to low lying infrastructure, agriculture production and livelihood were beginning to show. The heavy rain left two-thirds of Guyana's capital, Georgetown, flooded, affecting over 120,000 and killing six. More than 40% of Guyana's population lost some or all of their possessions.

An outbreak of Leptospirosis added to the death toll. In addition to raw sewage, dead livestock and other animals contaminated the food waters. Warnings were issued to avoid playing in the water and avoid contact as much as possible. The Ministry of Health, under advisement of PAHO/WHO, issued doxycycline as prophylactic treatment to prevent further outbreak.

== Fatalities ==
A total of 34 lives were lost during the flooding. Seven persons died by drowning and the rest were attributed to illness rising from the flood.

The Great Flood was Guyana's worst natural disaster in decades, and was compared with the flooding of 1934 and 1888, but according to some, it was also a "man-made disaster."

== Aftermath ==
The Hope Canal project was a direct result of the 2005 flooding. It was a controversial project, and beset with delays.

== See also ==
- Water supply and sanitation in Guyana
- Climate of Guyana
