= Mahaicony =

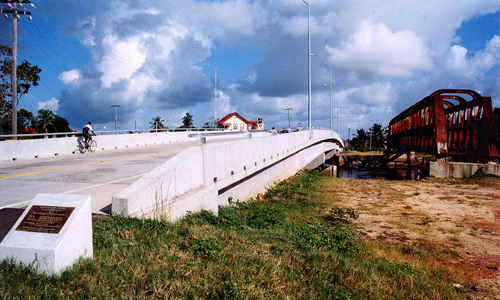
- The Mahaicony Bridge in 2006

- Location in Guyana
- Coordinates: 6°33′N 57°48′W
- Country: Guyana
- Region: Mahaica-Berbice

Population
  - Total: 2,000

Mahaicony is a community that is made up of several villages in East Coast Demerara, Mahaica-Berbice, Guyana. Mahaicony's physical boundaries on the coast is from De Hoop village in the west to Calcutta village in the east.

Central Mahaicony incorporates the villages of Farm, Zeskenderen, L’Excellence and Yorkshire Hall and the main branch road leads to the communities of Perth and Wash Clothes.

== Economic activity ==
Farming and cattle-rearing are the economic mainstays of the village.

The area produces over 15,000 metric tons of paddy rice each year. The activities of the community are usually affected by flooding during the rainy season and the drying up of ponds during the dry season.

== Education ==
There are two main Secondary schools -- Mahaicony Secondary School and Novar Secondary School. Over crowded classrooms is one of several problems faced by both teachers and students of Mahaicony Secondary School. In the surrounding area primary schools are scattered around from Mahaicony, Zeeland in the west to Calcutta in the east to Mora Point in the deep south. Access to primary education is not a problem but the culture of the community is that teens take the agricultural fields at an early age, hence, fewer attend secondary school. The general conception is that somebody has to do the farming.

Area secondary schools include Mahaicony and Novar, and primary schools in Karamat, Gorden Table, Mortice, Strat-Campbelle, Mahaicony, Zeeland and Calcutta.

== Public Services ==
The area has the Mahaicony Cottage Hospital, a police station, a post office, a National Insurance Scheme office, as well as a mosque. The Mahaicony Technical Institute also hosts events for the public.

The Hospital is an old land mark for the community, as the main health outreach alongside several health centres. The facility has Ultrasound, X-ray and other high profile technologies. The facility operates under the administration of Ministry of Health and Guyana Public Hospital Corporation (GPHC). The hospital also receives support from NGOs.

== Notable people ==
- Shana Yardan (1943–89), poet
