= Mahaica-Berbice =

Region of Guyana

Coordinates: 6.229522°N 57.886845°W

Mahaica-Berbice Region 5
- Administrative Region
- Flag

- Map of Guyana showing Mahaica-Berbice region
- Country: Guyana
- Regional Capital: Fort Wellington

Area
  - Total: 4,190 km^{2} (1,620 sq mi)

Population (2022 census)
  - Total: 57,667
  - Density: 13.8/km^{2} (35.6/sq mi)

Mahaica-Berbice (Region 5) is a region of Guyana. Its capital is Fort Wellington. Located between the Mahaica and Berbice Rivers, it is spread over an area of 4,190 km^{2} (1,620 sq mi), and is the third smallest region by area in Guyana. As per the 2022 census, it had a population of 57,667 inhabitants. The major economic activities include livestock rearing and agriculture.

== Geography ==
Mahaica-Berbice (Region 5) is one of the ten administrative regions of Guyana. It is spread over an area of 4,190 km^{2} (1,620 sq mi), and is the third smallest of the ten regions of Guyana by area. The region was established during the 1980 administrative reform of Guyana consisting of parts of the East Demerara-West Coast Berbice district. It extends from the east of the Mahaica River to the west of Berbice River. Its capital is Fort Wellington.

The topography consists of mostly low lying coastal plains with an average elevation of 25.08 m (82.3 ft) above sea level. Savannah and clay and sandy hills are present towards the interior. he region has about 0.16 million hectares of forested area, covering about 40% of its land area.

The district has a tropical rainforest climate (Köppen climate classification: Af) with an average annual temperature is 28.06 °C (82.51 °F). The district receives an average annual rainfall of 11.56 cm (4.55 in) and has 229.6 average rainy days in a year.

== Demographics and economy ==
As per the official census in 1980, the region had a population of 53,898 inhabitants. It decreased to 51,280 in the 1991 census, before increasing to 52,400 during the 2002 census. As per the 2022 census, it had a population of 57,667 inhabitants.

The major economic activities include livestock rearing and agriculture. Major agricultural produce include rice, sugercane, and coconut. There are several dams across the Mahaica river, which helps irrigate the farmlands. The indigenous population make several handicrafts such as furniture, and baskets.

== Communities ==
List of communities and settlements:

- Abary
- Bel Air
- Belladrum
- Blairmont (Blairmont Place)
- Burma
- Bush Lot
- Catherinas Lust
- Cotton Tree
- Esau and Jacob
- Fort Wellington
- Gordon Table
- Governor Light
- Hopetown
- Ithaca
- Jacoba
- Lichfield (Forty-two)
- Mahaicony (Mahaicony Village)
- Mora Point
- Moraikobai (Moraikobe)
- Mortice
- Number 4 (Edderton Village)
- Number 7 (Blairmont)
- Number 8 (Inverness)
- Number 9 (Expectation)
- Number 11 (Woodley Park)
- Number 40 Village (Seafield, Forty)
- Number 41 (Forty-one Village)
- Perth (Perth Village)
- Pine Ground
- Rising Sun
- Rosignol
- Saint Francis Mission
- Saint John
- Tempe
- Washington
- Weldaad
