= Water supply and sanitation in Guyana =

Data
- Water coverage (broad definition): 83%
- Sanitation coverage (broad definition): 70%
- Continuity of supply: Mostly intermittent
- Average water use (L/person/day): 243
- Average urban water and sanitation tariff (US$/m^{3}): 0.32 US$/m3
- Share of household metering: 24%

Institutions
- Decentralization to municipalities: No
- National water and sanitation company: Guyana Water Inc. (GWI)
- Water and sanitation regulator: Public Utilities Commission (PUC)
- Responsibility for policy setting: Ministry of Housing and Water
- Sector law: None
- No. of urban service providers: 1

Guyana, meaning "land of many waters", is rich in water resources. Most of the population is concentrated in the coastal plain, much of which is below sea level and is protected by a series of sea walls. A series of shallow reservoirs inland of the coastal plain, called "water conservancies", store surface water primarily for irrigation needs. Key issues in the water and sanitation sector in Guyana are poor service quality, a low level of cost recovery and low levels of access.

== Access ==
=== Overview ===
The Joint Monitoring Program (JMP) for water and sanitation of WHO/UNICEF data defines a basic water source as "Drinking water from an improved source, provided collection time is not more than 30 minutes for a round trip including queuing". JMP figures define basic sanitation as facilities that are designed to hygienically separate excreta from human contact and are not shared among other households.

	Urban	Rural	Total
At least basic access to drinking water	100	93.93	95.5%
At least basic sanitation	91.51	83.69	85.8%

Percentage of coverage of water and sanitation at the institutional level:

	Water	Sanitation	Hygiene	Source
Hospitals	86	75	92	2004 USAID supported Service Provision Assessment
Schools	68	68	-	2015 UNICEF publication Advancing WASH in Schools Monitoring

=== Water supply ===
Many households have access to several sources of water supply - such as rainwater harvesting, public supply and bottled water - balancing the availability and quality of the various sources. Overall, 94% of the population, as of 2015, had access to improved water sources, however Region 9 is considerably worse; only 42% in this region get drinking water from an improved source. Regions 1, 7, and 8 also have relatively low percentages using improved sources, with 81% for Region 1 and 65% for Regions 7 and 8.

Between 2002 and 2012, the number of households with piped water increased, however in that time, bottled water as the primary household drinking water increased from 7.9% to 33%. This indicates some doubt regarding the quality of the pipe-borne water.

Drinking water supply

Proportion of population using improved water supplies 2017
	Nation	Rural	Urban
Accessible on premises	94	92	>99
Piped	65	58	87
Non-piped	31	38	13

Main Source of Drinking Water (2014)
			Nation	Rural	Urban
Improved sources	Piped sources	Into dwelling	20.4	18.3	26.3
Improved sources	Piped sources	Into yard/plot	7.5	7.9	6.2
Improved sources	Piped sources	To neighbor	1.1	1.3	.6
Improved sources	Piped sources	Public tap/stand pipe	.7	.6	.9
Improved sources		Tube well/bore hole	.1	.1	0
Improved sources		Protected well	2	2.7	.1
Improved sources		Protected spring	.2	.1	.6
Improved sources		Rain water collection	18.3	22.4	7.3
Improved sources		Bottled water	43.8	39	56.9
Unimproved sources		Unprotected well	1.7	2.3	0
Unimproved sources		Unprotected spring	.4	.3	.6
Unimproved sources		Cart with tank/drum	.4	.6	0
Unimproved sources		Surface water	1.9	2.6	0
Unimproved sources		Bottled water	1.2	1.5	.6
Unimproved sources		Other	.2	.2	0
Unimproved sources		Missing	0	0	0

=== Sanitation ===
Proportion of population using improved sanitation facilities (including shared) 2017
	Nation	Rural	Urban
Latrines and other	28	34	9
Septic tanks	66	61	81
Sewer connections	2	<1	8

Sewers only exist in the capital, Georgetown.

The proportion of the population with basic handwashing facilities at home: 77% (2017).

== Service quality ==
Service quality for customers connected to the public system is poor, including low water pressure in most service areas, intermittent supply in all service areas, and a high risk of bacterial contamination due to the fact that about half of the public supplies receive no disinfection.

Throughout the coastal area of the country the aquifer that supplies most of the drinking water has a high level of iron, making the water red. Iron removal plants are being built to remedy the problem.

== Water resources ==
Groundwater, which consists of three distinct aquifers, provides about 90% of the domestic water needs of the country. The groundwater system comprises three aquifers:

- The "upper" sand is the shallowest of the three aquifers and its depth varies from 30 to 60 m, with thickness ranging from 15 to 120 m. It is not used as a source of water because of its high iron content (>5 mg/L) and salinity (up to 1,200 mg/L).
- The "A" sand is typically encountered between 200 and 300 m below the surface with thickness ranging from 15 to 60 m. Water from the "A" aquifer requires treatment for the removal of iron.
- The "B" sand is found at about 300 to 400 m with thickness of between 350 and 800 m. Water from this aquifer has very little iron, a high temperature and a trace of hydrogen sulfide which can be treated with aeration.

From about 1913 to 1993, the head in the "A sand" aquifer has declined by 20 meters. According to a 1998 study by the US Army Corps of Engineers, long-term studies are needed to determine the capability of the aquifer to sustain increased withdrawals. Hydrological data are lacking throughout the country, particularly since the late 1960s when data collection decreased dramatically.

== History and recent events ==
Institutionally the sector has evolved from two separate utilities, GS&WC and GUYWA, which were merged in 2002 into a single utility, Guyana Water Inc. (GWI). In 2003 a five-year management contract was signed, which was cancelled by the government in 2007. The utility is now attempting to consolidate itself under a Turnaround Plan.

=== Georgetown Sewerage and Water Commissioners (GS&WC) ===
The Georgetown Sewerage and Water Commissioners were established in 1929 under British colonial rule to operate and maintain the sewerage and waterworks of Central Georgetown.

After the independence of Guyana in 1966 the Pure Water Supply Division of the Ministry of Public Works was responsible for policy setting in the water sector, as well as for water supply outside of Georgetown. The Ministry of Health had the responsibility for sewerage and sanitation activities.

=== Guyana Water Authority (GUYWA) ===
The Guyana Water Authority (GUYWA) was established in 1972 to construct, operate and maintain water distribution systems outside of Georgetown to small towns, rural areas and most of the Hinterland regions, taking over the water service provision in these regions from the Ministry of Public Works. GUYWA was under the policy direction of the Ministry of Public Works, Communications and Regional Development. In 1984 responsibility for provision of water services was also placed in the hands of the Regional Democratic Councils, one for each of the country's 10 regions, working alongside GUYWA.

In 1994 GS&WC was made an autonomous public sector institution under the control of the Minister of Works and Communications through the Georgetown Sewerage and Water Amendment Act Number 4.

=== Reorganization, creation of GWI and private sector participation ===
In 2000, with the assistance of the donor community led by the U.K. Department for International Development (DFID), and the World Bank, the Government of Guyana embarked on a reorganization of the water sector with the goal of increasing access to safe and affordable water.

Specifically it aimed to achieve: (i) a modern, efficient, and customer-oriented utility; (ii) long-term financial sustainability; and (iii) an institutional framework characterized by independent regulatory functions and a clear division of responsibilities. The Caribbean Development Bank, the European Union and the European Investment Bank also supported the reforms with financial commitments.

In 2002, the Water and Sewerage Act was passed, which merged the Georgetown Sewerage and Water Commissioners (GS&WC) and the Guyana Water Authority (GUYWA), to form Guyana Water Inc. (GWI). In January 2003, a performance-based five-year management contract was awarded to an international private operator, Severn Trent Water International (STWI). The contract was fully funded through a grant from the British government. Furthermore, the mandate of the existing Public Utility Commission (PUC) was extended to review water tariffs. A ten-year investment program was elaborated and drinking water standards were established.

=== Termination of management contract and Turnaround Plan ===
In February 2007, the government terminated the management contract alleging that the company failed to meet five out of the seven objectives in the contract. Minister of Housing and Water Harry Narine Nawbatt said that the decision was influenced by the results of an audit into STWI's performance carried out by the consulting firm Halcrow.

According to the Minister, four out of the five missed targets were:

- Severn Trent was expected to reduce the levels of non-revenue water to 25% by the end of 2005, but according to the audit report this target was not achieved and stood at 66.5% at the end of 2005.
- Severn Trent also allegedly failed to increase revenue collection by 90% as stipulated by the management contract.
- The contract also stipulated that 85% of GWI's customers should be metered by the end of 2005, but only 24.7% of the customers were metered at that time.
- 52 per cent of the Amerindian settlements should have received potable water by 2005, but only 4.3 per cent of those settlements actually received water.

STWI, however, pointed out a number of achievements during the four years it operated in Guyana: "significant improvements in water quality"; an alleged reduction of non-revenue water from 61% to 44% (a figure that is in contradiction with what the government says was the result of the audit); an alleged increase in hours of water supplied and system pressure by more than 80%; an alleged increase in revenues from G$ 900m 2002 to G$1.7bn in 2006; the introduction of a customer information and billing system; and emergency supplies during the 2005 floods. STWI also pointed out several factors beyond its control that made it difficult to achieve its contractual targets: a disastrous flood in 2005; energy costs increasing by over 40%; the difficulty of recruiting and retaining qualified Guyanese staff; and the lack of timely government approval of investment programs and of the appointment of key Guyanese staff.

In December 2007, the government approved a Turnaround Plan for GWI, focusing on reducing non-revenue water and financially consolidating the utility.

== Responsibility for water and sanitation ==
Responsibility for sector policy is vested in the Ministry of Housing and Water. The Public Utilities Commission (PUC), a multi-sectoral regulatory body, is in charge of reviewing water and sewer tariffs. However, the PUC seems to be less autonomous from government than other utility regulators in the Caribbean. Local government plays no role in the sector.

Water and sewerage service provision is the responsibility of Guyana Water Incorporated (GWI), a commercial public enterprise. GWI's service area is divided into five divisions along the Coast, numbered 1-5 from West to East. The Hinterland is served by a separate unit within GWI which provides support to community-based organizations that provide services in that part of the country.

== Efficiency ==
An estimation of non-revenue water is difficult, since only 25% of consumers were metered in 2007. Nevertheless, GWI tentatively estimates non-revenue water at more than 70%.

Labor productivity in GWI is relatively high with a ratio of 3 staff per 1,000 connections in 2007. This is partly due to the contracting out of services such as leak repairs.

== Financial aspects ==
The national water utility uses a highly complex tariff system. It does not recover operation and maintenance costs, and receives operational subsidies from the government. Investments are financed through external assistance and investment subsidies from the government.

=== Tariffs ===
The tariff system used by GWI is highly complex, consisting of 27 different water tariffs and 4 sewer tariffs in 2007. Water tariffs are differentiated between metered and un-metered customers; domestic, commercial, institutional and industrial customers; whether customers are former customers of GUYWA (outside the capital) or GS & WC (in Georgetown); and the rateable value of properties in the case of domestic customers.

In 2007 most domestic customers were categorized in the lowest category of rateable property value and were unmetered. Outside Georgetown these customers were charged a flat rate of 8,899 Guyanese dollar (US$47) per year, equivalent to US$3.90 per month. In Georgetown they were charged a flat rate of 11,799 Guyanese dollar (US$62), equivalent to US$5.18 per month. Domestic customers in high rateable properties paid about 80% more.

Metered tariffs for domestic customers in the lowest category of rateable property value are set at 61 Guyanese dollar per cubic meter (US$0.32/m^{3}) outside Georgetown and 63 Guyanese dollar per cubic meter (US$0.33/m^{3}) in Georgetown. At a consumption of 20 cubic meters per month (133 liters/capita/day for a family of five) that tariff would be equivalent to an increase of the water bill of 64% for customers outside Georgetown and 28% for customers in Georgetown compared to the currently prevailing flat rate for undeterred customers.

Sewer tariffs for domestic unmetered customers are set at 4,999 Guyanese dollars per year (US$26), or 42% of the water bill or a low rateable domestic customer in Georgetown.

GWI plans to rationalize its tariff system. Any modification in tariffs needs to be approved by the Public Utilities Commission. In addition, due to the political sensitivity of water tariffs, any modification de facto also needs to be approved by Cabinet.

=== Billing and cost recovery ===
The billing cycle for unmetered customers is annual and most users, including many with water meters, are so far billed a flat rate only. Bills for metered customers whose meters are being read are sent out on a quarterly basis. The level of cost recovery is low. According to GWI's Turnaround Plan, the utility's average billing efficiency in the 2003-2006 period was only 68%, meaning that 32% of its customers did not pay their bills. In 2006 GWI collected revenues of only G$1.2 billion, while operation and maintenance costs stood at G$3.5 billion, including more than 60% paid for electricity, mainly for pumping. The difference was partly made up by a government subsidy of G$1.4 billion, and partly resulted in unpaid bills to GWI's suppliers and deferred maintenance.

=== Investment and financing ===
Past investment levels were low and investments were predominantly financed by external donors. The utility now intends to increase its investments to US$21.2 million in the 2008-2010 period, equivalent to US$7 million per year or US$9/capita/year. The investments are intended to be used primarily to reduce non-revenue water and to rehabilitate the sewerage system in Georgetown. US$6.4 million (30%) of the investment program is being funded from existing commitments from three donors (the World Bank, IDB and DFID). The remainder is expected to be financed by existing government commitments from its own resources, as well as by additional commitments expected from the government and donors.

== External Cooperation ==
Currently, the main external partners for the sector are the Inter-American Development Bank, DFID from the UK and the World Bank. The European Union, the Caribbean Development Bank and the government of Japan through JICA. In the past USAID was also involved in supporting water supply in Guyana, particularly in the coastal area outside of Georgetown.

=== Inter-American Development Bank ===
The Georgetown II Water Supply & Sewer System Program was a US$30m project approved in 1999 that aimed "to improve sanitary conditions in Georgetown and reduce current levels of environmental degradation by improving the quality of the water supply and sewerage services". The three program components were: (a) further improving the availability and quality of potable water and the reliability of the distribution system; (b) improving the sewerage system; and (c) strengthening the Georgetown Sewerage and Water Commissioners (GS&WC), the service provider for Georgetown at the time of the project's approval and one of the two predecessors of GWI.

After a cancellation of part of the funding as part of a debt relief package for Guyana, the size of the project was reduced to US$16.4 million. The project closed in 2010 after achieving only some of its objectives: Water pressure increased from 2 pound per square inch (psi) to 6 psi, short of the target of 10psi; the iron content of drinking water declined after two water treatment plants were commissioned in 2010; non-revenue water apparently declined, although exact numbers are not available; sewage pumps stations were built, but it is too early to determine if they will be properly operated and maintained; a septic tank disposal facility has been built, but was not operational; water metering in Georgetown was increased to 50%, short of the target of 80%; and no significant improvements were reached in terms of collection efficiency and cost recovery. The IDB is preparing two new water and sanitation projects in Guyana, a US$10million Georgetown sanitation improvement project and a US$12m+ project to rehabilitate the water system of Guyana's second largest town, Linden.

=== United Kingdom (DFID) ===
The UK approved a 13 million Pound Sterling water sector program in 2000, aiming at "providing sustainable universal access to safe and affordable water, focusing on peri-urban and rural areas, secondary towns and the Guyana hinterland." The introduction of private sector participation through a performance based management contract was considered "a key feature of the process" and "a critical success factor in achieving the overall project goal". The project also aimed at creating a single service provider, GWI. The project closed in 2009, the creation of GWI having been achieved, but the management contract having failed. No project completion report was available on DFID's website as of May 2011.

=== World Bank ===
The Water Sector Consolidation Project is a US$12.3m project approved in 2005 that "aims to support the achievement of sustainable universal access to safe and affordable water for the population of Guyana, especially the poor." The project's main component foresees the construction of water treatment plants and associated transmission and distribution infrastructure, including metering, in three systems: Anna Regina area water supply system in Division 1 of GWI; Parika area water supply system in Division 2; and Rosignol area water supply system in Division 4. These investments are expected to provide a continuous supply of iron-free water under good pressure, as opposed to the current level of supply which consists of intermittent supply of water with a high iron content at mostly low pressure.

=== European Union ===
The European Union finances a water, sanitation and hygiene program for Hinterland communities implemented by the Guyana Red Cross Society with the support of the International Federation of Red Cross and Red Crescent Societies. The 3-year program is being implemented in Regions 1 and 9.

=== Caribbean Development Bank ===
The Caribbean Development Bank provides funding for small-scale water infrastructure through the Basic Needs Trust Fund.

=== Japan ===
The Japanese government, through the Japan International Cooperation Agency (JICA), provided a grant of US$12m to finance the construction of two water treatment plants and associated pipes in the Corriverton area on the coast near the border with Suriname. The project aims to provide water to 33,000 residents in over 23 villages. The first of the two plants was inaugurated in March 2008.

== See also ==
- Electricity sector in Guyana

== Sources ==
- Organización Mundial de Salud (OMS): Evaluación de los Servicios de Agua Potable y Saneamiento 2000 en las Américas Guyana
- Food and Agriculture Organization of the UN Guyana profile
