= Agriculture in Guyana =

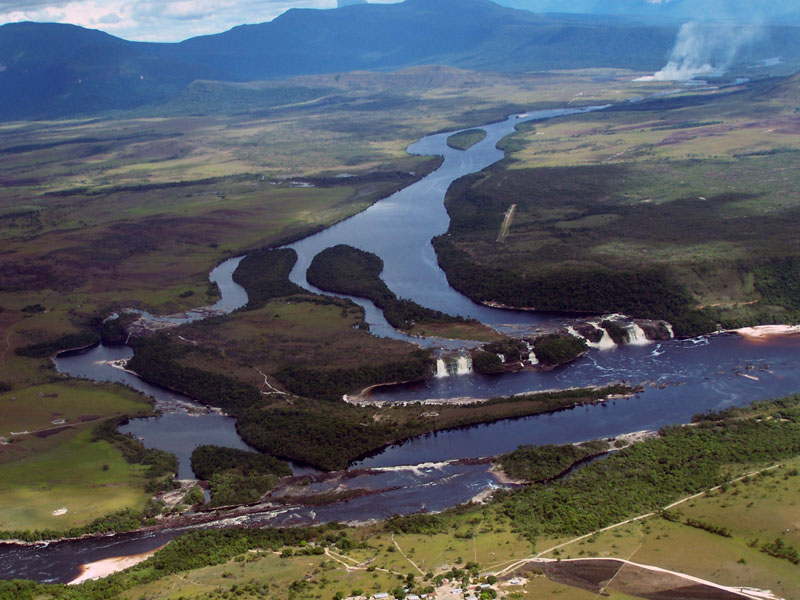
Guyana's extensive river system and water cycle is important for agriculture.

Agriculture in Guyana is dominated by sugar and rice production. Although once the chief industry, it has been overshadowed by mining.

== Land use ==
Historically, agriculture was the chief economic activity in Guyana despite the coastal plain which comprised only about 5 percent of the country's land area being suitable for cultivation of crops, 2% arable land. Much of this fertile area lay more than one meter below the high-tide level of the sea and had to be protected by a system of dikes and dams which were built by the Dutch using slave labour. In the 1980s, there were reports that the 200-year-old system of dikes in Guyana was in a serious state of disrepair.

== Production ==
Sugar and rice are the most important primary agricultural products, as they had been since the nineteenth century. Sugar was produced primarily for export whereas most rice was consumed domestically. Today in Guyana sugar production generates the most revenue in the primary industry, at around 15% of the total annual GNP. Other important crops include wheat, bananas, coconuts, coffee, cocoa, citrus fruits, pepper and pumpkin and livestock commodities from the country's various cattle ranches including beef, pork, poultry, dairy products and fish, notably shrimp. In some areas peanuts are also an important crop. Many of these products including rice are of extreme importance to national food security within the country. Small amounts of vegetables, vegetable oil and tobacco are also produced. During the late 1980s, some farmers succeeded in diversifying into specialty products such as heart-of-palm and asparagus for export to Europe.

Many Guyanese practise subsistence agriculture as well.

== Sugar ==
The sugar industry made a huge impact on Guyana's history; influencing politics, waves of immigration, and Guyana's place in the world economy. Guyana's nationalized sugar industry is led by Guysuco, which owns five estates and eight factories for growing and processing sugar cane.

It was the Dutch who determined the climate was ideal for growing sugarcane, and it was from here the particular Demerara sugar originated. Sugar plantation labour was a destination point for the Atlantic slave trade, and when slavery was abolished under English rule as British Guiana, indentured servants were brought in, mainly from India. Indo-Guyanese continue to be a major force in agriculture.

International prices for sugar have a significant impact on Guyana's mainly for-export sugar industry. Sugar trade favoured European countries with tropical colonies where the cost of labour was exceptionally low. The expansion of government subsidized beet sugar industries in countries such as Germany, Austria-Hungary, Italy and Russia led to a drop in world sugar prices, even as use of sugar continued to grow. The Brussels Sugar Convention of 1902 was the first international sugar agreement addressing sugar tariffs until the first World War.

The Booker company owned most sugar plantations in Guyana until the industry was nationalized in 1976. The rapid nationalization of the sugar industry in the mid-1970s led to severe management difficulties and an emigration of talent. The Guyana Sugar Corporation (GuySuCo), which took over the sugar plantations, lacked needed experience. Perhaps more important, Guysuco did not have access to the reserves of foreign capital required to maintain sugar plantations and processing mills during economically difficult periods. When production fell, Guysuco became increasingly dependent on state support to pay the salaries of its 20,000 workers. Second, the industry was hard-hit by labour unrest directed at the government of Guyana. A four-week strike in early 1988 and a seven-week strike in 1989 contributed to the low harvests. Third, plant diseases and adverse weather plagued sugar crops. After disease wiped out much of the sugarcane crop in the early 1980s, farmers switched to a disease-resistant but less productive variety. Extreme weather in the form of both droughts and floods, especially in 1988, also led to smaller harvests.

The extent of Guyana's economic decline in the 1980s was clearly reflected in the performance of the sugar sector. Production levels were halved, from 324,000 tons in 1978 to 168,000 tons in 1988.

Guyana exported about 85 percent of its annual sugar output, making sugar the largest source of foreign exchange. But the prospects for sugar exports grew less favourable during the 1980s. Rising production costs after nationalization, along with falling world sugar prices since the late 1970s, placed Guyana in an increasingly uncompetitive position. A 1989 Financial Times report estimated production costs in Guyana at almost US$400 per ton, roughly the same as world sugar prices at that time. By early 1991, world sugar prices had declined sharply to under US$200 per ton. Prices were expected to continue decreasing as China, Thailand, and India boosted sugar supplies to record high levels.

=== Production of Raw Sugar: 1990–2018 ===
Year	Production (M/T)	Exported (M/T)
1990	132	132
1991	162.5	150
1992	246.9	229.5
1993	246.5	236.8
1994	256.7	239.4
1995	253.8	225.4
1996	280.1	255.5
1997	276.4	247.4
1998	253.9	236.8
1999	321.4	270.9
2000	273.3	277.3
2001	284.5	252.3
2002	331.1	282.0
2003	302.4	312.0
2004	325.3	289.6
2005	246.1	230.3
2006	259.5	238.6
2007	266.5	246.0
2008	226.3	205.0
2009	233.7	212.0
2010	220.8	203.5
2011	236.5	211.8
2012	218.1	197.1
2013	231.8	160.3
2014	216.3	189.6
2015	231.1	212.7
2016	183.6	158.5
2017	137.3	108.0
2018	104.6	77.8

In the face of such keen international competition, Guyana grew increasingly dependent on its access to the subsidized markets of Europe and the United States. The bulk of sugar exports (about 160,000 tons per year in the late 1980s) went to the European Economic Community (EEC) under the Lomé Convention, a special quota arrangement. The benefits of the quota were unmistakable: in 1987, for example, the EEC price of sugar was about US$460 per ton, whereas the world price was only US$154 per ton. (The gap between the two prices was not so dramatic in other years, but it was significant.) Guyana was allowed to sell a much smaller amount of sugar (about 18,000 tons per year in 1989, down from 102,000 tons in 1974) in the United States market at prices comparable to those in the EEC under another quota arrangement, the Caribbean Basin Initiative. Maintaining preferential access to the European market was a priority in Guyana; in 1988 and 1989, production levels were too low to satisfy the EEC quota, so Guyana imported sugar at low prices and reexported it to the lucrative European market. Even so, Guyana fell 35,000 tons short of filling the quota in 1989 and 13,000 tons short in 1990.

The government of Guyana restructured the sugar industry in the mid-1980s to restore its profitability. The area dedicated to sugar production was reduced from 50,000 hectares to under 40,000 hectares, and two of ten sugarcane-processing mills were closed. Guysuco also diversified into production of dairy products, livestock, citrus, and other items. Profitability improved, but production levels and export earnings remained well below target. In mid-1990, the government took an important step toward long-term reform of the sugar industry - and a symbolically important step toward opening the economy - when Guysuco signed a management contract with the British firms Booker and Tate & Lyle. A study by the two companies reportedly estimated that US$20 million would be needed to rehabilitate Guyana's sugar industry.

The Skeldon factory was overhauled from 2005 to 2009, costing US$185m and making the single biggest investment in Guyana's history.

In 2017, several sugar estates were closed or consolidated, reducing production of sugar to a forecasted 147,000 tons in 2018, less than half of 2017 production. Exports in 2019 were 92,246 tonnes, the lowest in nearly a century, GuySuCo pinning the blame on mechanical failures at the factory level. Plans to develop more value-added sugar products were initiated, such as white sugar production and a high grade of molasses for rum, as well as seeking more favourable trade arrangements.

=== Value chain and by-products ===
Cane tops, bagasse, filter mud and molasses are the major by-products of the sugarcane industry.

Demerara Distillers is a major buyer of molasses for rum manufacture, however they had to import molasses in 2019 due to shortfalls in domestic production. Ethanol production from molasses has been done in small scale.

Bagasse is burnt as fuel in sugar factories. Although primarily self-serving, GuySuCo's operations in Skeldon have also contributed energy to Guyana's grid.

=== Labour ===
The sugar industry has always been tied to using the lowest cost labour, utilizing slavery and indenture as well as social policies that retained labour as close to the estates as possible. These factors have contributed to some of the country's most significant slave revolts and labour protests such as the Demerara rebellion of 1823, the Berbice slave uprising, and the Ruimveldt Riots (1905). The Guyana Agriculture Workers Union went on strike in 1977, lasting 135 days.

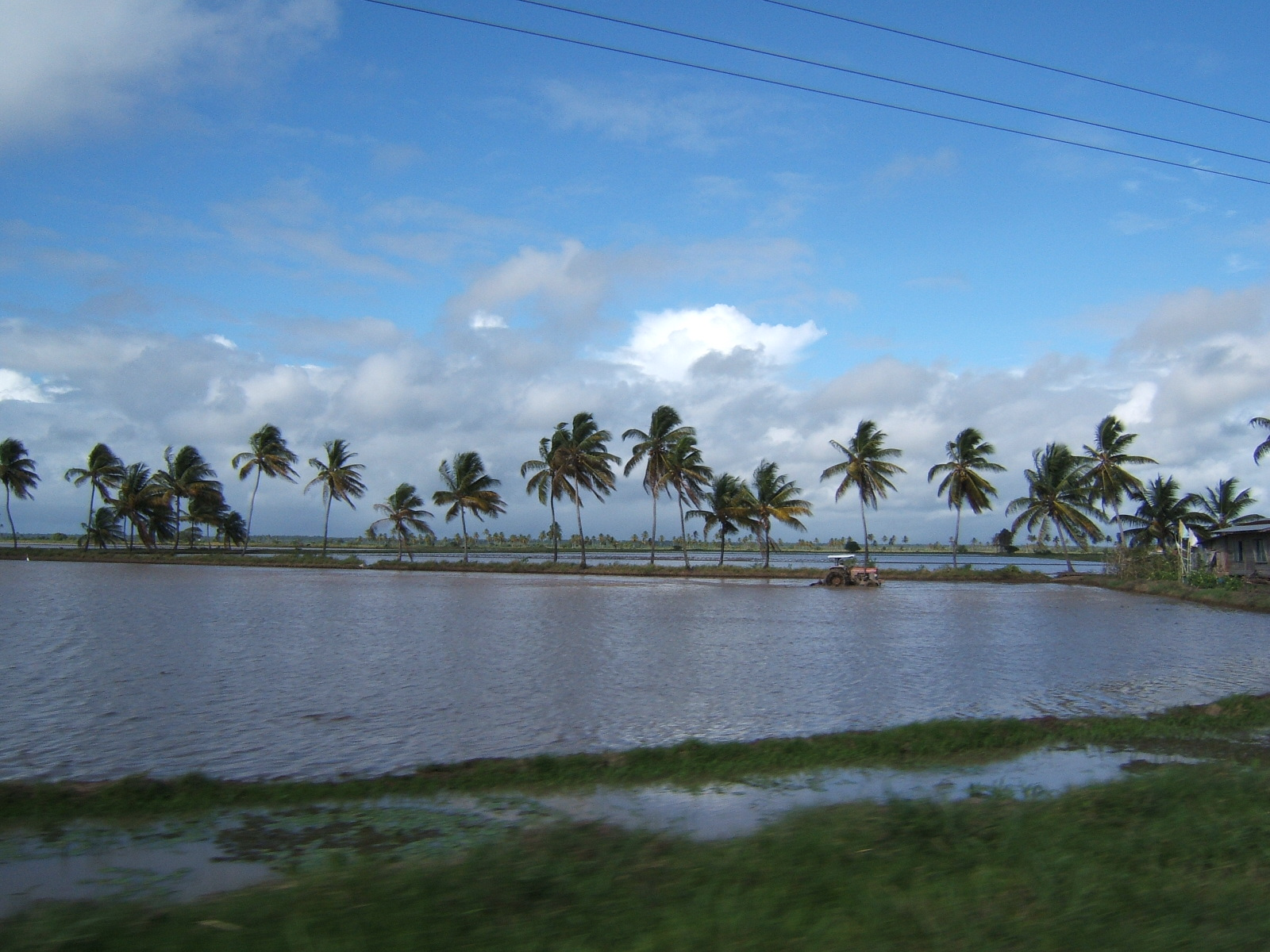
A tractor on a rice field in Guyana.

== Rice ==
Rice is produced for local consumption and is the country's largest current agricultural commodity export. Introduced by the Dutch to feed slaves working in the sugar industry, production increased when indentured Indians were brought to the country. After the completion of indenture, Indians who stayed in British Guiana were given land as compensation and many used it for rice cultivation. Rice production is weakened by poor irrigation infrastructure and susceptible to weather conditions and encroaching salt water from the Atlantic. This is because the rice producing regions are along the coastal belt of Guyana.

Venezuela and Portugal are major importers of rice from Guyana.

== Peanuts ==
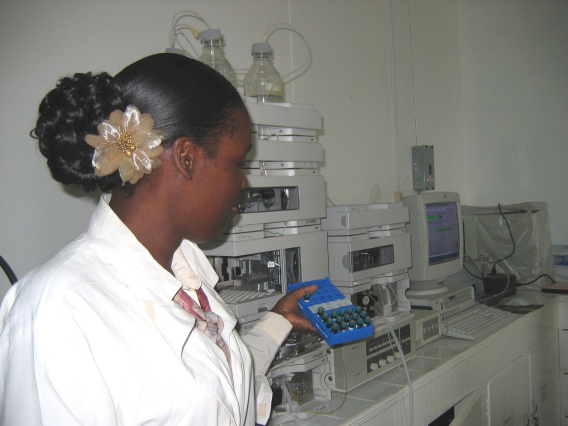
A technician at the Guyana Food and Drug Department Laboratory in Georgetown, Guyana selecting peanut samples to be tested with new equipment.

Peanut production plays an important role in some areas of the country. In the remote Rupununi region of Guyana, peanut farming dominates the local economy and farmers depend upon the crop as their main source of income. Recent agricultural developments have enhanced production from 1,100 pounds per acre to over 2,500 in four years. As a result of increasing yields Guyanese farmers have not only benefited from local markets in Guyana but have increasingly seen the export of Guyanese peanuts in the Caribbean market.

== Forestry ==
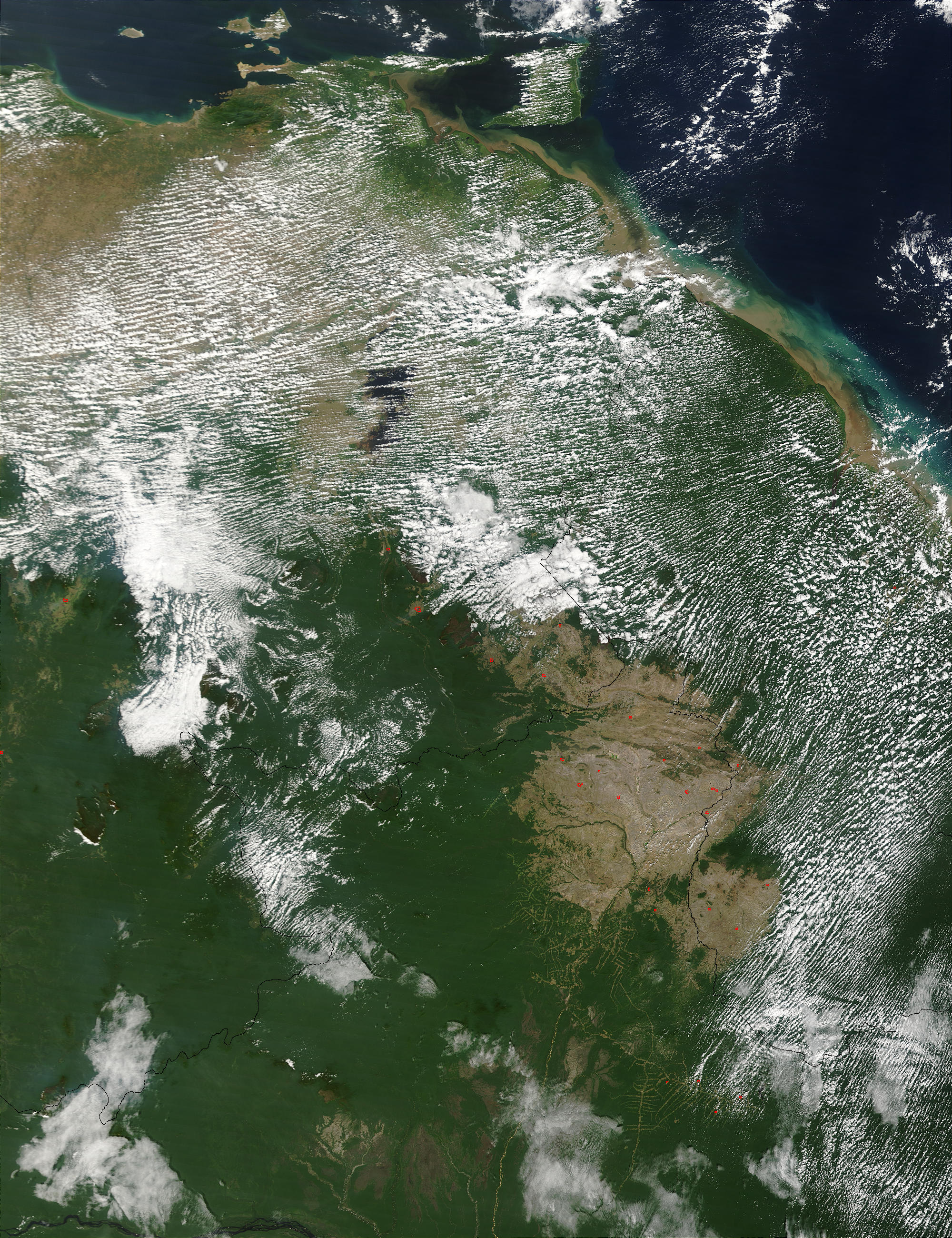
NASA satellite image of forest burning in Guyana

Timber was the least exploited but most abundant natural resource in Guyana in the early 1990s. Timber is mainly exported as logs, and forest land concessions are held by large domestic and international firms.

Profitability has been limited. The two main difficulties in timber production were the limited access to the forests and electrical power problems at the major lumber mills. The government and interested groups overseas were addressing both difficulties. The government launched the Upper Demerara Forestry Project in the early 1980s to improve hardwood production on a 220,000-hectare site. In 1985 the International Development Association, part of the World Bank, provided a US$9 million loan for expansion of the forestry industry. In 1990 the government sold the state-owned logging company and announced plans to allow significant South Korean and Malaysian investment in the timber industry. Showing concern for the long term condition of its forests, the government also planned to set aside 360,000 hectares of rain forest for supervised development and international research into sustainable management.

== Fisheries ==
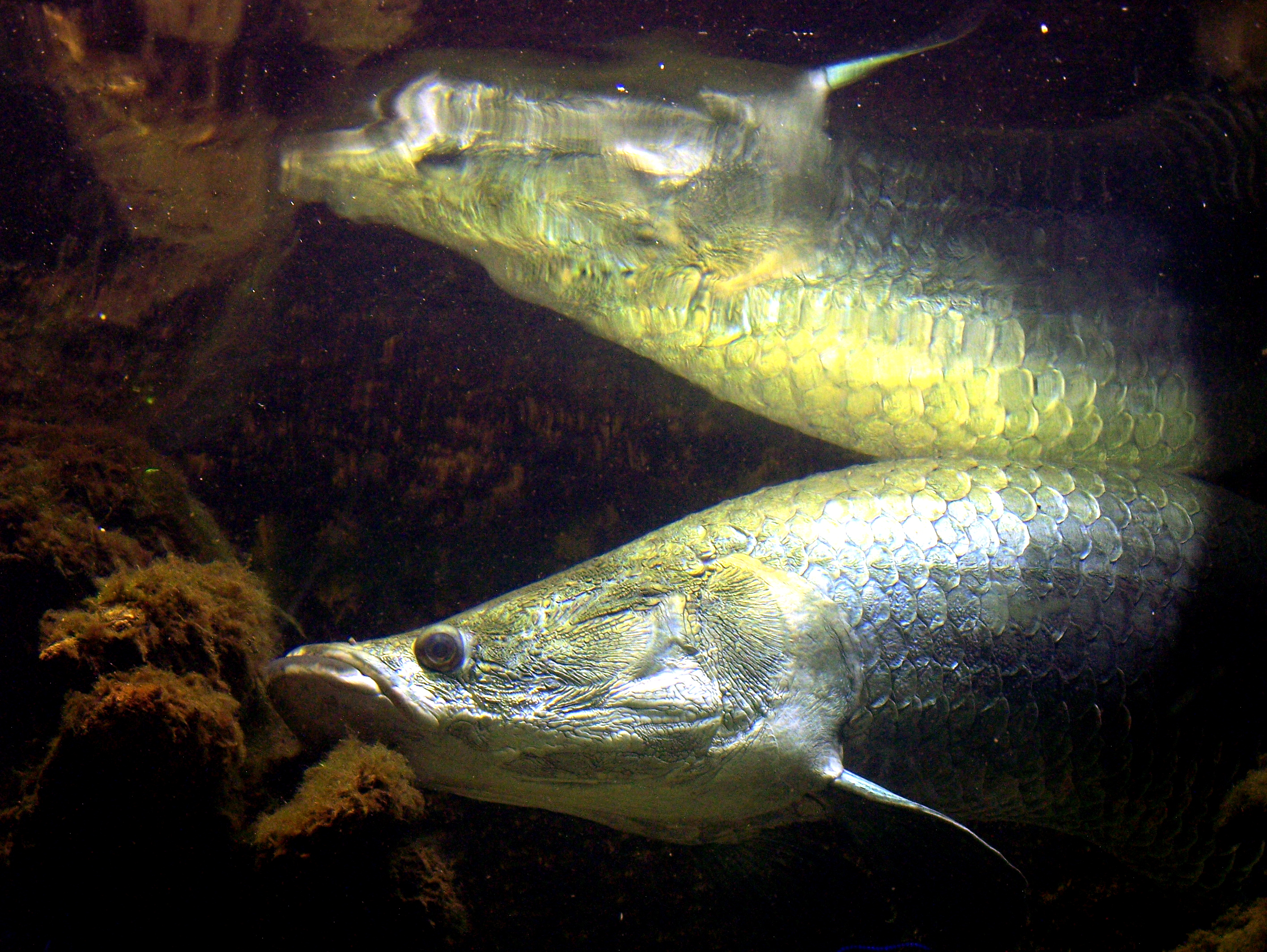
Arapaima gigas

Fishery products took on increasing importance during the 1980s as potential earners of foreign exchange. By the end of the decade, shrimp had become the third leading earner of foreign exchange after sugar and bauxite. Fisheries production in Guyana totalled about 36,000 tons in 1989, down from 45,000 tons in the mid-1980s. The most valuable portion of the catch was the 3,800 tons of shrimp. Many fishermen reportedly sold their shrimp catch at sea to avoid taxes and earn foreign currency. Thus, shrimp exports may have been much higher than recorded. Shrimp exports were expected to continue increasing as Guyana developed shrimp farms along its coast; Guysuco began operating one such farm in the late 1980s. The bulk of the fisheries catch was sold at the dockside and consumed domestically. A US$5 million fish-processing plant was under construction on the Demerara River in 1990, raising the possibility of frozen fish exports. The government sold Guyana Fisheries Limited, which employed about 5,000 people, to foreign investors in 1990.

=== Industry concerns ===
Between 2019 and 2023, Pritipaul Singh Investments Inc. (PSI), a major fishing company in Guyana, reported a sharp drop in exports; from 20 containers monthly to just two. General Manager Pritipaul Singh attributed the decline to offshore oil and gas activities, particularly those by ExxonMobil. Singh expressed concerns over seismic exploration and chemical discharges, which Environmental Impact Assessments (EIAs) have linked to potential harm to marine ecosystems. He has called on the Environmental Protection Agency (EPA) to conduct independent investigations. Singh, who has invested in 107 fishing vessels and a US$50 million processing facility, emphasized the industry's importance to national GDP and urged government support amid declining fish catches and stunted shrimp development.

== Livestock ==
Guyana experienced a cattle boom in the southern Rupununi savannah area during the late 1800s. A cattle trail opened in 1920, connecting Brazil to the south to the northern coast, and cattle were purchased from Brazil. Dadanawa Ranch was the largest during this era. Demand for beef was mainly related to the growing rubber industry of Manaus. When the rubber industry faded, the beef industry soldiered on until the Rupununi Uprising, and the subsequent damage to ranches and buildings greatly diminished the industry.

Livestock production was not a major activity in Guyana because of a shortage of adequate pasture land and the lack of adequate transportation. In 1987 there were an estimated 210,000 cattle, 185,000 pigs, 120,000 sheep, and 15 million chickens in the country. The country imported Cuban Holstein-Zebu cattle in the mid-1980s in an effort to make Guyana self-sufficient in milk production; by 1987 annual production had reached 32 million liters, or only half the target quantity.

== Agricultural institutions ==
There are numerous important institutions and organizations which are involved in agriculture in Guyana:

- Agriculture In-Service Training & Communication Centre (AITCC)
- University of Guyana Faculty of Agriculture
- Guyana Rice Development Board (GRDB)
- Guyana School of Agriculture (GSA)
- GUYSUCO
- Hydrometeorological Service
- Inter-American Institute for Cooperation on Agriculture (IICA)
- Lands and Surveys Commission
- Ministry of Agriculture (MOA)
- National Agricultural Research Institute (NARI)
- Fisheries, Crops & Livestock (MFCL)
- Dairy Development Programme (NDDP)
- Drainage and Irrigation Board (NDIB)
- New Guyana Marketing Corporation (NGMC)
