= Cheddi Jagan =

President of Guyana from 1992 to 1997

His Excellency Cheddi B. Jagan
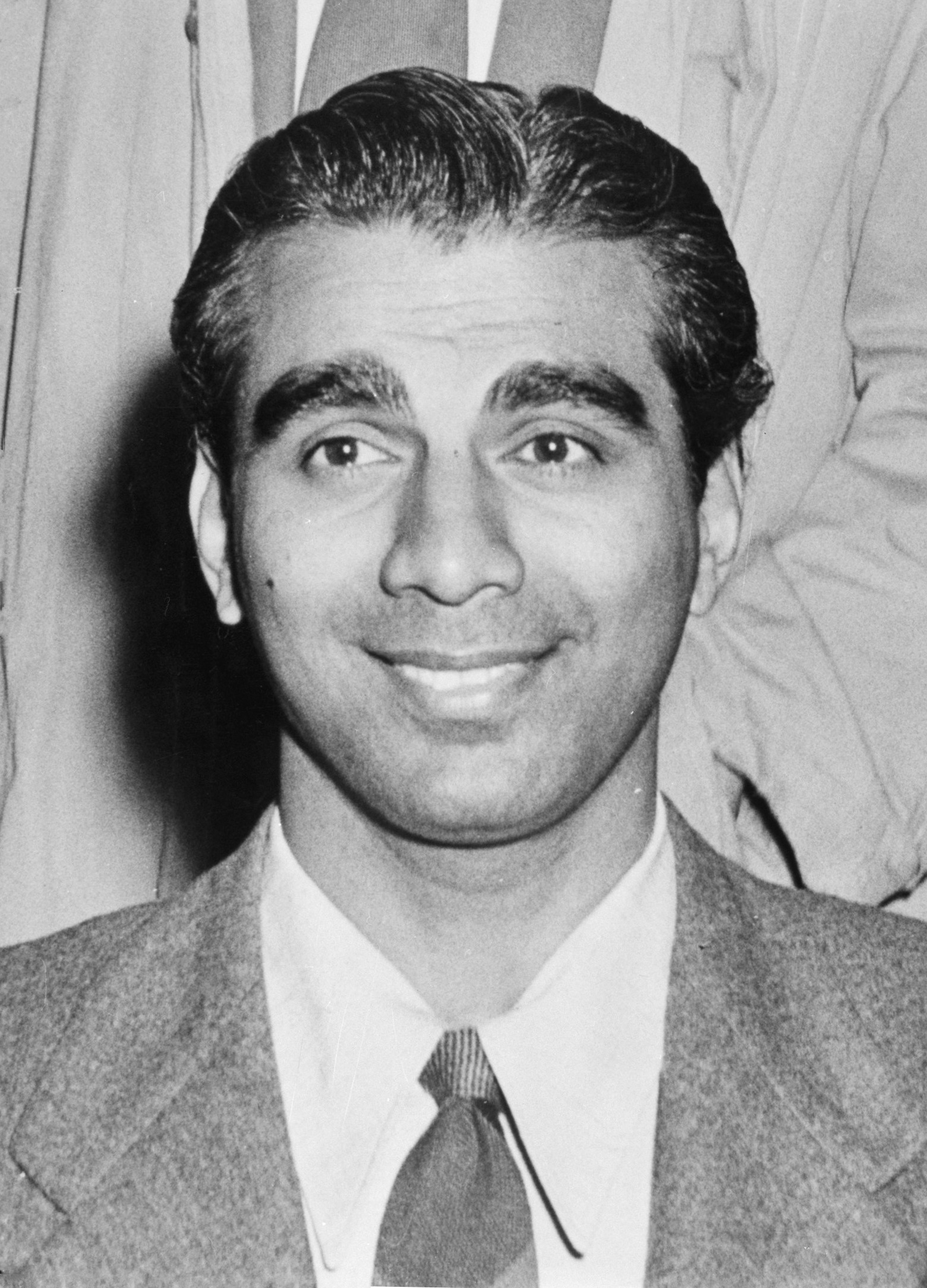
- Jagan in 1962

4th President of Guyana
- In office 9 October 1992 – 6 March 1997
- Prime Minister (also First Vice President): Sam Hinds
- Preceded by: Desmond Hoyte
- Succeeded by: Sam Hinds

1st Premier of British Guiana
- In office 5 September 1961 – 12 December 1964
- Monarch: Elizabeth II
- Governor: Ralph Grey; Richard Luyt
- Preceded by: Inaugural holder
- Succeeded by: Forbes Burnham
Additional ministry
In office 5 September 1961 – 12 December 1964
Minister of	Planning and Development
Preceded by	Inaugural holder
Succeeded by	Forbes Burnham

1st Chief Minister of British Guiana
- In office 30 May 1953 – 9 October 1953
- Monarch: Elizabeth II
- Governor: Alfred Savage
- Preceded by: Inaugural holder
- Succeeded by: Interim government
Additional ministry
In office 30 May 1953 – December 1953
Minister of	Agriculture, Forests, Lands and Mines
Preceded by	John Sydney Dash
Succeeded by	Frank McDavid

Minister of Trade and Industry of British Guiana
- In office 1957–1961
- Monarch: Elizabeth II
- Governor: Patrick Muir Renison; Ralph Grey

Leader of the Opposition of Guyana
- In office 1966–1973
- Succeeded by: Marcellus Fielden Singh
- In office 1976–1992
- Preceded by: Marcellus Fielden Singh
- Succeeded by: Desmond Hoyte

General Secretary of the People's Progressive Party
- In office 1970 – 6 March 1997

President of the British Guiana Rice Producers Association
- In office 1952–1953

Personal details
- Born: Cheddi Berret Jagan; 22 March 1918 Ankerville, Port Mourant, Berbice, British Guiana (present-day East Berbice-Corentyne, Guyana)
- Died: 6 March 1997 (aged 78) Washington, D.C., U.S.
- Party: People's Progressive Party (from 1950)
- Other political affiliations: Manpower Citizens' Association (1945–1946); Political Affairs Committee (1946–1950)
- Spouse: Janet Rosenberg (m. 1943)
- Children: Cheddi "Joey" Jagan Jr. Nadira Jagan-Brancier
- Relatives: Derek Chunilall Jagan (brother)
- Education: Queen's College, Georgetown; Howard University
- Alma mater: Central YMCA College (BS); Northwestern University (DDS)
- Occupation: Dentist; politician
- Awards: Order of Friendship of Peoples (1978); Order of Solidarity (1988); Order of the Liberator (1993); Grand Commander of the Order of the Star and Key of the Indian Ocean (1994); Order of the Companions of O. R. Tambo (2005); Order of Liberation (2007)
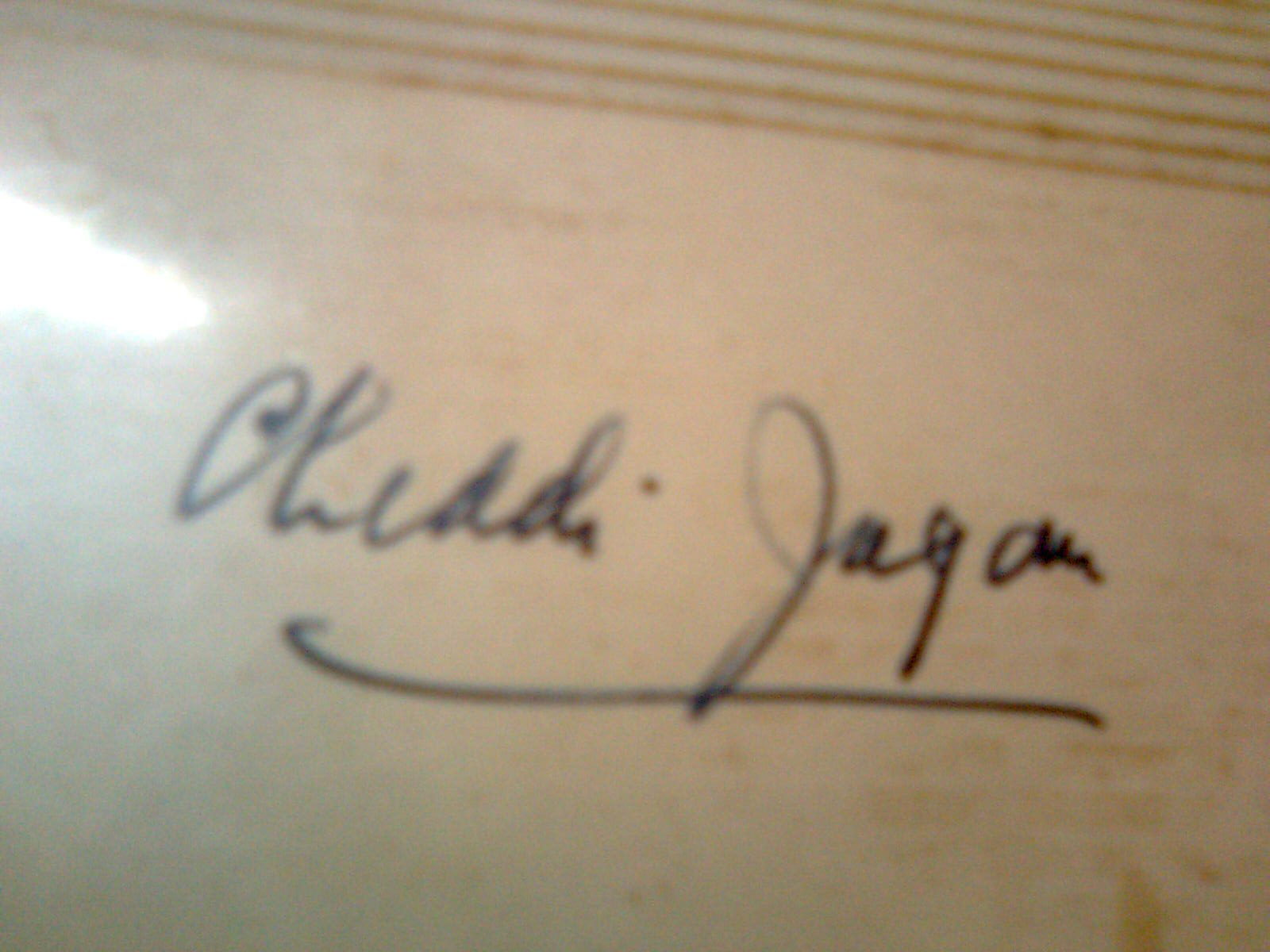
- Signature

Cheddi Berret Jagan (Note: /ˈdʒæɡən/ Ja-gun) (22 March 1918 – 6 March 1997) was a Guyanese politician and dentist who was first elected Chief Minister in 1953 and later Premier of British Guiana from 1961 to 1964. He later served as President of Guyana from 1992 to his death in 1997. In 1953, he became the first Hindu and person of Indian descent to be a head of government outside of the Indian subcontinent.

Jagan founded the People's Progressive Party along with his wife Janet and Forbes Burnham, and served as the first leader of the party. Jagan was a leading figure in the campaign for the independence of Guyana from the United Kingdom, and advocated for increased powers for trade unions at a time when British Guiana's economy was dominated by powerful foreign enterprises. Jagan lost his position as Prime Minister to Forbes Burnham following the 1964 British Guiana general election, and Burnham would become Guyana's first Head of Government following independence. 28 years later, Jagan was elected president in the 1992 Guyanese general election, which was regarded as the first "free and fair" election since 1964.

== Early life ==
Cheddi Berret (anglicized corruption of "Bharat") Jagan was born on 22 March 1918 in Ankerville, Port Mourant, a rural village in the county of Berbice (present-day East Berbice-Corentyne). He was the eldest of 11 children. His parents were Indian Hindus who were Kurmi caste. They emigrated from British India to British Guiana as indentured labourers. They were both from the Basti district in the then North-Western Provinces in the Awadh and Bhojpuri regions of the Hindi Belt in North India (in present-day Uttar Pradesh, India). His mother Bachaoni came to British Guiana as a child with her mother, while his father Jagan also came as a child with his mother and brother. Both his mother's and father's family immigrated to British Guiana aboard the Elbe in 1901; his father being two years old and his mother 18 months when they arrived. His father's family were indentured to Albion Estate and his mother's family was indentured to Port Mourant Estate under the management of J.C. Gibson. His parents were married in 1909 and lived with their respective families till they were of age at sixteen years and his mother moved in with his father and grandmother in a joint family situation.

The Jagan family lived in rural poverty, working in the cane fields to support themselves. His mother had worked on the estate till Jagan was nine years old. His father had worked his way up to become head driver on the estate, but it did not amount to much change in pay, and he had to retire at 50 due to bad health. Jagan received his primary education at Port Mourant Primary and the Rose Hall Scots School. He went on to pursue secondary education at R. N. Persaud's private secondary school. When Jagan was 15 years old, his father sent him to Queen's College in the capital city of Georgetown (about 160 kilometres (100 mi) away) for the next three years. Upon graduation, Jagan found his employment options in Guyana limited to agricultural work or converting to Christianity and becoming a teacher, so his father sent him to the United States to study dentistry with $500, the family's life savings, so that he would not end up in the cane fields and he would not have to compromise his Hindu faith.

== Education and early career (1935–1946) ==
Jagan left for the United States in September 1935 or 1936 with two friends, and did not return to British Guiana until October 1943. He lived in Washington, D.C., for two years, enrolled in a pre-dental course at Howard University. To cover his expenses, Jagan took a job as an elevator operator. During the summers, he worked in New York City as a door-to-door salesman. Jagan's performance helped him to win a scholarship for his second year at Howard. In 1938, he was admitted to the four-year dental program at the dental school at Northwestern University in Chicago. He graduated in 1942 with a Doctor of Dental Surgery degree. From 1938 to 1942, Jagan was also enrolled at the Central YMCA College in Chicago and graduated with a Bachelor of Science degree.

After returning to British Guiana, Jagan established a practice in Georgetown on 68 Main Street. During this time, he began to become politically engaged, and became involved with trade unions in the sugar industry. In 1945 he was made the treasurer of the Manpower Citizens' Association, though he was removed after a year after objecting to union policy.

== Political career ==
=== Early political career (1946–1953) ===
Jagan co-founded the Political Affairs Committee (PAC) in 1946 along with his wife, Janet, as well as H.J.M. Hubbard, and Ashton Chase. He was subsequently elected to the Legislative Council in November 1947 as an independent candidate from Central Demerara constituency. In 1949 Jagan became the president of the Sawmill Workers Union.

On 1 January 1950, the People's Progressive Party (PPP) was founded by a merger of the PAC and the British Guiana Labour Party (BGLP), with Jagan as its leader, former BGLP leader Forbes Burnham as its chairman and Jagan's wife Janet as secretary.

The PPP quickly gained a mass following when they organised protests against the colonial administration, following an incident where colonial police shot dead five workers at Enmore sugar plantation in 1948 when they were participating in strike action.

=== Chief Minister of British Guiana (1953) ===
On 27 April 1953, Jagan won the 1953 British Guiana general election, with his PPP party winning 18 of 24 seats.

Jagan's government immediately dissented against British rule. Jagan encouraged strike action against important sugar company Booker, refused to send a delegation to the Coronation of Queen Elizabeth II, repealed a law on "undesirable publications" passed by the colonial government, and repealed another law banning immigration of politically left-leaning individuals from the West Indies.

Taking place in the middle of Second Red Scare and McCarthyism, Jagan's actions and policies led to British worries about a possible communist revolution in Guyana. Winston Churchill expressed fears that Jagan was a Marxist-Leninist, and claimed Jagan could allow the Soviet Union a foothold in South America, saying "[W]e ought surely to get American support in doing all we can to break the Communist teeth in British Guiana … [P]erhaps they would even send Senator McCarthy down there." Declassified documents from MI5 show that the intelligence service concluded that the party were "not receiving any financial support from any communist organisation outside the country". However, Jagan's wife Janet may have been a member of the Young Communist League USA before she moved to Guyana.

On 8 October 1953, the PPP government passed the Labour Relations Act (modelled on the Wagner Act). The next day, on 9 October, the British administration suspended the constitution of British Guiana and troops were deployed. The queen had signed the order to dispatch troops on 4 October. On 9 October, a contingent of Royal Welsh Fusiliers arrived in Georgetown on HMS Superb, and Jagan was dismissed from his position and arrested. According to MI5, Jagan was unaware of the possibility of British intervention or of his arrest. Jagan appealed to former British prime minister and sitting opposition leader Clement Attlee, who responded "Regret impossible to intervene." Jagan was forced to resign as Chief Minister after 133 days. Britain installed an interim government.

=== Interim Government (1953–1957) ===
After the suspension of the constitution, Jagan departed for London with Forbes Burnham on 19 October 1953 to protest the suspension and attended the debate in the House of Commons on 21 October. During his time in the United Kingdom, both Jagan and Burnham were subject to covert surveillance by American and British intelligence services. He would subsequently arrive in India with Burnham on 20 November 1953, and meet Jawaharlal Nehru in an attempt to garner support.

Jagan's movements were restricted to Georgetown from 1954 to 1957, and both he and his wife were closely monitored and kept under house arrest. During this period of time, colonial police would routinely raid the residences of senior members of the party to seize subversive literature. In 1954, Jagan was sentenced to 6 months in prison with hard labour for violating a restriction on his movement, travelling to the countryside and as a result leaving Georgetown. In court, Jagan likened British Guiana to a "vast prison".

Senior member of the party Forbes Burnham split with Jagan politically in 1955, dividing the PPP into two separate factions named "Burnhamite" and "Jaganite". These two factions in the PPP would both go on to contest the 1957 Guyanese election as PPP candidates. Burnham as a candidate was generally further to the right of the political spectrum. Support for the two factions followed mostly racial lines, as Burnham was the leading Afro-Guyanese figure in the PPP. However, the split was not entirely racial; prominent Afro-Guyanese politician Sydney King remained in the Jaganite faction, and Indo-Guyanese J.B. Lachmansingh supported Burnham. However, Sydney King and Afro-Guyanese Martin Carter and Rory Westmaas would both leave the party one year later due to being "ultra-leftist". Clem Seecharan made the claim that they left because they believed that Jagan was compromising Marxist ideals for racial pragmatism (i.e., supporting Indo-Guyanese policies to appeal to his support base). This further reduced the number of active Afro-Guyanese politicians within the PPP.

=== Minister of Trade and Industry (1957–1961) ===
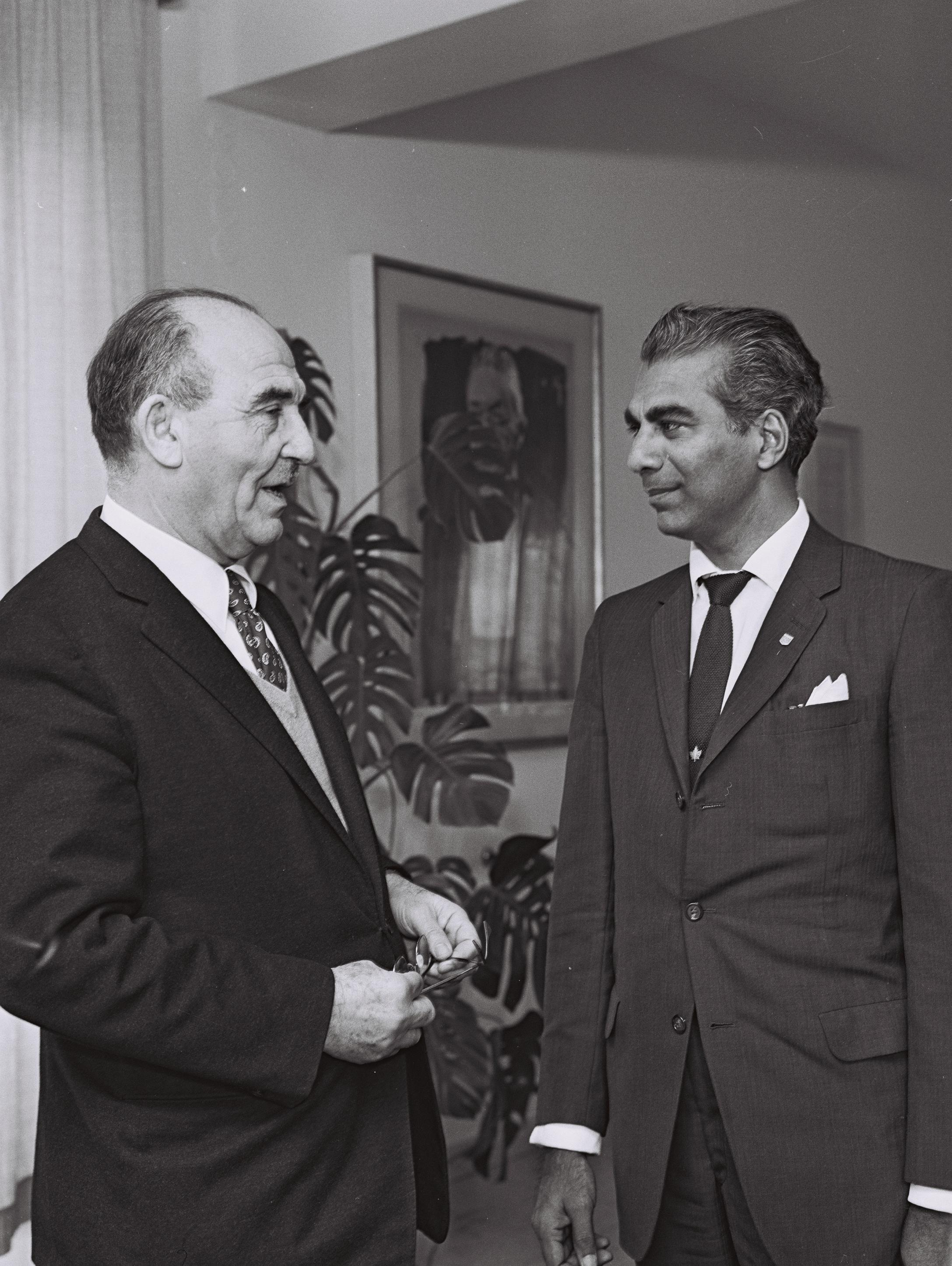
Cheddi Jagan meeting with Levi Eshkol during a visit to Israel in 1961

Jaganites won a majority of seats in the 1957 British Guiana general election winning 9 seats to the Burnhamite 3, and 2 seats for other parties. Following this outcome, the Burnhamite faction split entirely from the PPP, and Burnham founded the People's National Congress (PNC). Jagan became minister of trade and industry, remained as PPP leader and was a member of the cabinet. He did not become Prime Minister during this time – there was no such position. The PPP government did not have possession of the Ministries of Finance, Foreign Affairs or Administration, and power resided mostly with the Governor, Ralph Grey.

During the lead-up and aftermath of the 1957 elections, Guyanese politics began to strongly follow racial lines. Jagan's faction was majority Indo-Guayanese, and advocated for policies that would benefit mainly Indo-Guyanese, such as an increase in land for rice production and sugar industry reform through increased union powers. Jagan's veto of West Indies Federation membership further alienated Afro-Guyanese voters- the Federation was majority Afro-Caribbean. Similarly, Burnham merged the PNC with the United Democratic Party to consolidate his grip on middle class Afro-Guyanese support. This style of politics along racial lines in Guyana became known as apan jhaat, which is Guyanese Hindustani for "vote for your own kind".

=== Premier of British Guiana (1961–1964) ===
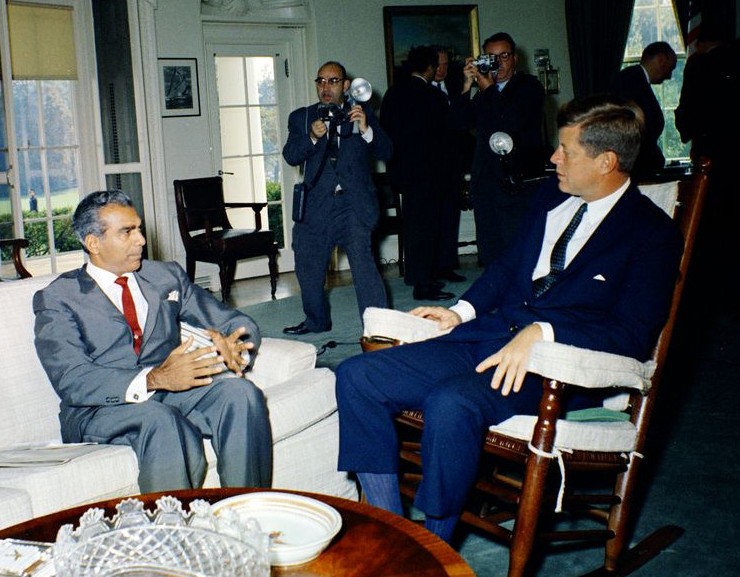
Jagan with John F. Kennedy in Washington DC, 25 October 1961

After a PPP victory in the August 1961 elections, Jagan became Premier, serving for three years. The elections were held as first-past-the-post, with 35 members of the Legislative assembly; the PPP won 20 seats, almost twice the number won by Burnham's PNC, and 10 seats in the 13-seat senate, which led to mass demonstrations led by the PNC, a general strike and racially motivated violence. This violence would peak in early 1962, after Jagan's government proposed what became known as the "Kaldor Budget". Advised by economist Nicholas Kaldor, on 31 January 1962, the PPP government proposed an increase in tax and import duty which was opposed by opposition parties. The budget imposed austerity, the tax increases would have significantly impacted the Afro-Guyanese community, and the opposition was not consulted. However, Arthur M. Schlesinger Jr. expressed the opinion that the tax scheme was entirely orthodox and suitable for Britain, and the budget was praised by both the New York Times and the London Times. Following the budget, action was taken against the government, which culminated on 16 February 1962 in the destruction of 56 businesses, 87 businesses damaged by fire and 66 looted. One Police Superintendent was killed and 39 injured, Four looters shot and 41 injured. The rioters also attacked the Electricity Plant, the Water Works, Parliament, and Jagan's residence. The British response was to send two warships, HMS Troubridge and HMS Wizard, to stop the violence. Jagan's official residence suffered fire damage during the riots.

Following the 1961 elections, Jagan met John F. Kennedy in person in Washington, D.C., on 25 October, and on 18 December he addressed the United Nations calling for a date for Independence from the United Kingdom.

The lead-up to the 1964 elections included a concerted effort by officials from the United States to ensure that Jagan did not win the election, due to fears about Jagan supposed communist views. A March 1961 CIA estimate opined that Jagan's wife, Janet, was a communist, and that Jagan was under communist influence. Jagan had also expressed support and encouragement for the Cuban Revolution. The United Kingdom and United States differed on their opinions of how to solve the situation, with the British suggestion being that Jagan should be educated rather than removed from power. Jagan's meeting with Kennedy in 1961 did not significantly change the American opinion of his political leanings. The Americans decided that Burnham's policies were preferable to those of Jagan, and began to take actions against Jagan, including delaying independence from Britain, advocating a proportional representation electoral system which would be to the detriment of Jagan's electoral chances, and providing support for strike action. These actions continued despite Jagan contacting Kennedy to protest his case. The CIA helped fund and organise the protests that led to the February 1962 demonstrations, and in April 1963 the CIA used $1 million of allocated funds to support the 80-day general strike. This strike action would later be cited as evidence that Jagan was not capable of governing British Guiana.

In October 1963, a constitutional conference was called. British Prime Minister Harold Macmillan summoned the three main Guyanese political leaders (Jagan, Forbes Burnham and Peter D'Aguiar) to London where Colonial Secretary Duncan Sandys announced the holding of fresh elections (previously the agreement was that independence would be granted before any further elections were called), a delay in the date of independence from 1963 to 1964, and a change in the electoral system from first-past-the-post to proportional representation. In a letter to President Kennedy, MacMillan explained that if Jagan refused to cooperate, Britain would suspend the constitution. Jagan agreed to elections in 1964 under proportional representation, but John Prados posits that this was only because he received assurances from Forbes Burnham that a coalition between the two parties would be acceptable. The Guiana United Muslim Party and Justice Party were both set up with the assistance of the CIA to split the Indo-Guyanese voting bloc, and the United States funded Burnham's campaign activities against Jagan's party.

The months preceding the December 1964 elections were marked with extensive civil disorder. Arson was a daily occurrence, nearly 200 people were murdered and 1000 were injured, and more than 15,000 people were forced from their homes. Violence came from both PPP and PNC supporters. On one occasion in August, a conference between the three political party leaders was interrupted when the PPP party headquarters was bombed on the same street. An article in Time Magazine accused Jagan of quietly encouraging the violence. There were multiple examples of racial violence across the country, including the fatal shooting of an elderly Afro-Guyanese couple on their farm, the death of a pregnant Indo-Guyanese woman at Bachelor's Adventure near Enterprise and the deaths of four Indo-Guyanese at Afro-Guyanese hands in Wismar. Further violence included the sinking of the Sun Chapman on 6 July and the following murders of 5 Indo-Guyanese individuals at Mackenzie.

In the December 1964 elections, the PPP won a plurality of votes and actually increased their vote share to 46%, but Burnham's party, the People's National Congress, and the conservative United Force held a majority of seats and were invited to form the government by Governor Richard Luyt. However, Jagan refused to resign, and had to be removed by Luyt. Jagan would begin his role as leader of the opposition.

Clem Seecharan would later point to Jagan's ideological inflexibility and his poor diplomatic handling of the electoral situation in Guyana as reasons for the strong American preference for Burnham over Jagan, and as a result Burnham becoming Guyana's first leader after independence.

=== Leader of the Opposition (1964–1992) ===
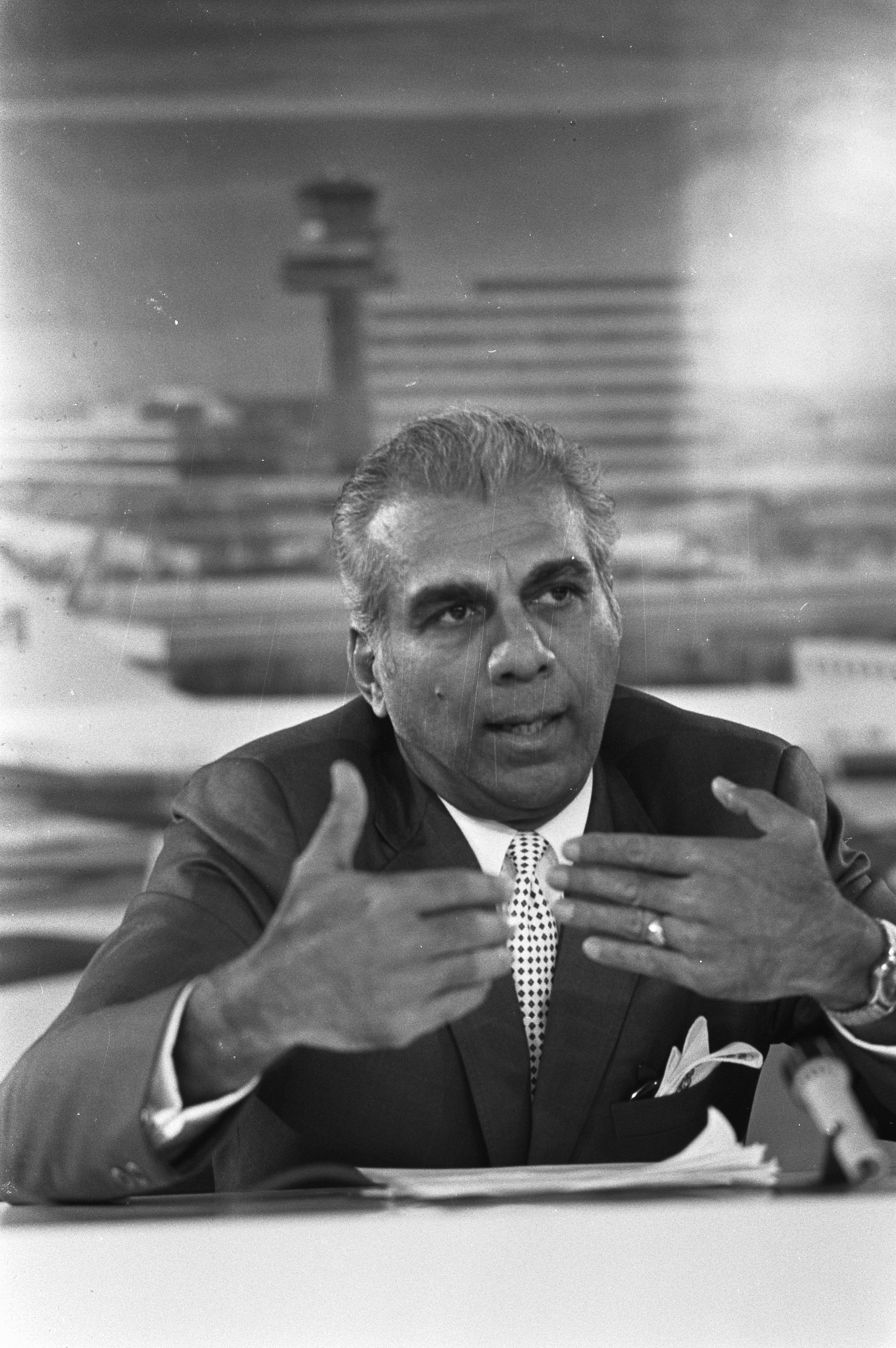
Jagan at a press conference in the Netherlands, 1972.

Following Burnham's election in 1964, a constitutional conference was held in London. Jagan refused to attend in protest at the imprisonment of PPP members at Mazaruni Prison. As agreed at the conference, Guyana gained independence from the United Kingdom on 26 May 1966. Jagan opposed this date for independence, as it was the anniversary of the Wismar Massacre of 1964. The same year, Jagan published "The West On Trial: My Fight for Guyana's Freedom", concerning his experience working towards Guyanese independence, which remains his most popular written work.

In 1965 Jagan attempted to enter the United States to join a protest against the Vietnam War but he was denied entry. He was again denied entry in 1967 to attend a planned speaking tour which had to be cancelled as a result.

He was elected as Leader of the Opposition and Minority Leader in 1966, and would remain in the role until 1973 when Marcellus Fielden Singh took over the role. He subsequently took the role again from 1976 until his election as president in 1992. During this time, Jagan would repeatedly protest at the authoritarian policies of Burnham's administration, with electoral fraud being reported in 1968, 1973, 1980 and 1985.

In 1969, the People's Progressive Party attended the 1969 International Meeting of Communist and Workers Parties, with Jagan attending personally. Jagan was subsequently elected General Secretary of the PPP.

In 1973, the PPP boycotted the National Assembly in protest at the fraudulent 1973 elections, and at the deaths of two Indo-Guyanese on election day. In 1974, a raid on Jagan's home found parts of a revolver and he was charged with illegal possession.

Starting in 1975, the PPP began a period of closer collaboration with Burnham's PNC, offering "critical support" when the PNC pushed for pro-socialist policies and was under the pressure of Venezuelan border claims, as well as proposing a national government with the PPP forming part of the ruling party in 1977. In 1978, Jagan was awarded the Order of Friendship of Peoples by the Soviet Union at the Kremlin.

The 1978 Guyanese constitutional referendum was strongly opposed by Jagan. The referendum would prolong the parliamentary term and would expand presidential powers. Jagan's party led a boycott of the vote. The referendum passed with 97% of the vote, and the vote is considered to be fraudulent.

Following the death of Burnham in 1985, Desmond Hoyte came to power. Influenced by Jimmy Carter, Hoyte would put forward electoral reforms which would lead to the 1992 elections being internationally recognised as free and fair.

=== President of Guyana (1992–1997) ===
Presidential Standard of Cheddi Jagan.

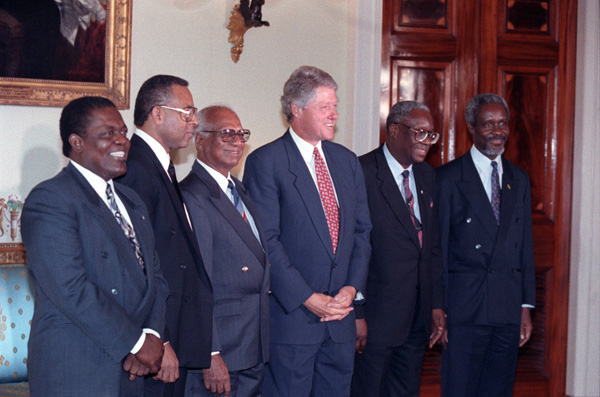
Cheddi Jagan (second from left) photographed with other heads of state and US President Bill Clinton in 1993.

After 28 years in opposition, the PPP won the 5 October 1992 elections with about 54% of the vote, and Jagan became president. Contrary to earlier foreign fears, he governed as a democratic socialist and not a Marxist–Leninist. Jagan would pursue policies to attract foreign investors and move towards free market policies. Jagan also had a cordial relationship with the Clinton Administration in the United States, unlike his difficult relationship with Kennedy in the 1960s.

Following the previous administration, the Guyanese economy was still recovering from flawed economic policies and high national debt, and low prices for major Guyanese exports such as bauxite, oil and bananas. Jagan would pursue a policy of investment in national infrastructure, including sea defences, irrigation and drainage systems, road and bridge projects and investment in health, education and electricity generation. Jagan would also try to improve free trade in the Americas.

During his time in power, Jagan would advocate for a New Global Human Order. This proposal was aimed at the need for developing countries to acquire the means to eradicate poverty and reduce inequality. This involved debt relief, pollution tax, a Tobin tax on currency exchange and cuts in arms spending. These proposals did not gain significant support. Jagan announced this proposal in a speech at the United Nations in late 1995.

== Political opinions ==
Jagan has been labelled as communist or Marxist by many different sources. Clem Seecharan said that the Jagan couple were both communists, although Cheddi was more ideological. In a discussion with V.S. Naipaul, Jagan elaborated on his appreciation of Marxist literature. Jagan also had regular communication with communist Billy Strachan. Political rival Forbes Burnham in 1957 classified Jagan and his allies as "dogmatists whose aim is communism and who abuse everyone with whom they do not agree". In 1984, Jagan stated that "I am not only fighting for the people of Guyana. I am fighting for the people of the world. I am contributing to that struggle. That struggle is winning. That is why the United States is so hysterical at the moment, because of that very fact, that what I stand for is winning". Jagan also went on to claim in 1990 that it was socialism in Eastern Europe which was failing, rather than communism, and stated that "Communism, as a system, has not been tried in any country as yet, and remains a highly moralistic and humanistic ideal and destination." If Jagan was a Marxist, he would have been the first democratically elected Marxist in the Western Hemisphere, ahead of Chilean leader Salvador Allende.

Percy Hintzen stated that "characterization of Jagan as a communist misses the complexity of his political philosophy… if Jagan was indeed a communist, it was certainly not reflected in the policies and programs that his party attempted to implement while in office." Arthur M. Schlesinger Jr. said Jagan was not a communist, but rather a "London School of Economics Marxist filled with charm."

== Personal life ==
After graduating from dental school in 1942, Jagan met Janet Rosenberg, a student nurse, in spring 1943. They married in 1943, and had two children: Nadira and Cheddi Jr. (who in turn produced five grandchildren).

Jagan and his wife shared a lifelong friendship with Billy Strachan, a leading British communist and a pioneer of black civil rights in Britain.

Janet Jagan followed her husband's footsteps and held the positions of prime minister and president in 1997 (succeeded as president by Bharrat Jagdeo in 1999).

=== Personality ===
Clem Seecharan characterised Jagan as a man of integrity, "who did not steal and never construed the political vocation as a means of amassing wealth". He would also label him as an "attractive and incorruptible man" known for his frugality. However, Seecharan would also accuse Jagan of ideological inflexibility and an "apparent inability to comprehend or empathise with African insecurities". An article by Indo-Guyanese author Frank Birbalsingh also praised his integrity, pointing out that "Never, in his half-century of involvement in politics, has anyone been able to point a finger at him, while charges of financial corruption, sexual misconduct or electoral fraudulence have been levelled at most of his contemporaries."

== Death ==
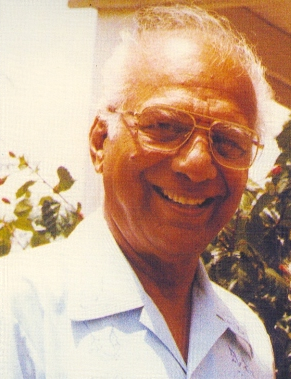
Jagan in later life

Jagan suffered a heart attack on 15 February 1997 and was taken to Georgetown Hospital before being flown by U.S. military aircraft then by U.S. Air Force helicopter from Andrews Air Force Base to Walter Reed Army Hospital in Washington, D.C., later that day. He underwent heart surgery there and died in Washington on 6 March 1997, 16 days before his 79th birthday. Prime Minister Sam Hinds succeeded him as president and declared six days of mourning, describing Jagan as the "greatest son and patriot that has ever walked this land". His funeral was postponed by a day to allow mourners time to visit who were caught in massive traffic jams, caused by the immense number of people traveling to Port Mourant for his funeral. More than 200,000 mourners attended. He had a state funeral in Georgetown and his cremation was at the Babu John (Jan) Crematorium in his hometown of Port Mourant. His final rites were done per Hindu customs and he was cremated on 12 March 1997. The site of his cremation became a samadhi (memorial) to him and later his wife, known as the Jagans' Memorial Monument.

== Legacy ==
The People's Progressive Party, which Jagan founded with Janet Jagan and Forbes Burnham, remains one of the two dominant political parties in Guyana, along with the PNC. Support for both groups continue to follow the racial divide between Afro-Guyanese and Indo-Guyanese. There are claims that Jagan may bear partial responsibility for the racial divide present in Guyanese politics. Walter Rodney said that "...more than one political party has been responsible for the crisis of race relations on this country. I think our leadership has failed us on that score." Rodney also pointed to external intervention as a catalyst for poor race relations.

The Cheddi Jagan Research Centre in Georgetown commemorates his life and work, complete with a replication of his office. The centre is located in the Red House which served as Jagan's official residence from 1961 to 1964. The Cheddi Jagan International Airport, the largest and primary international airport of the country, has been renamed after Jagan.

In 2007, Jagan was posthumously awarded the Order of Liberation of Guyana (OR). This award surpasses the Order of Excellence of Guyana, but was granted without an amendment to the constitution of orders and it does not appear in the list of national awards. Jagan also received the Order of the Companions of O.R. Tambo from South Africa in 2005.

Jagan's wide regard as "Father of the Nation" in Guyana is stated by several different sources, including the Cheddi Jagan Research Centre, the Guyana Chronicle, the Times of India and important political figures in the PPP such as Irfaan Ali. In contrast, PNC member and at the time Minister of Social Cohesion Amna Ally in a 2015 speech named Forbes Burnham the "Father of the Nation".

== Awards and honours ==
=== National honours ===
- Guyana
  - Order of Liberation (2007; posthumously) (Note: This award surpasses the Order of Excellence of Guyana, but was granted without an amendment to the constitution of orders and it does not appear in the list of national awards.)

=== Foreign honours ===
- Soviet Union
  - Order of Friendship of Peoples (1978)
- Cuba
  - Order of Solidarity (1988)
- Venezuela
  - Grand Collar of the Order of the Liberator (1993)
- Mauritius
  - Grand Commander of the Order of the Star and Key of the Indian Ocean (1994)
- South Africa
  - Supreme Companion of the Order of the Companions of O. R. Tambo (2005; posthumously)

== Selected publications ==
Jagan was also an important political author and speechwriter, and his publications include:

- Forbidden Freedom: The Story of British Guiana (Hansib, 1954)
- The West On Trial: My Fight for Guyana's Freedom (Harpy, 1966)
- The Caribbean Revolution (1979)
- The Caribbean: Whose Backyard? (1984)
- Selected Speeches 1992–1994 (Hansib, 1995)
- The USA in South America (Hansib, 1998)
- A New Global Human Order (Harpy, 1999)
- Selected Correspondences 1953–1965 (Dido Press, 2004)

== See also ==
- Cheddi Jagan Bio Diversity Park
- Cheddi Jagan International Airport

== Notes ==
Political offices
Preceded by Office established	Chief Minister of Guyana; 1953	Succeeded by Office abolished
Preceded by Office established	Premier of Guyana; 1961–1964	Succeeded by Forbes Burnham
