= Manpower Citizens' Association =

The Manpower Citizens' Association was a trade union and political party in British Guiana.

== History ==
The MPCA was first registered in 1937, and was initially led by Ayube Mohamed Edun. The union represented sugar workers, many of whom were Indo-Guyanese. After the Leonora sugar workers' strike in 1939, membership began to increase significantly, passing the 20,000 mark in 1943, making it the largest union in the country. In March 1939 the Sugar Producers' Association (SPA), the organisation for sugar estate owners, officially recognised the union. In 1945 Cheddi Jagan became its treasurer, but he left a year later after several clashes with the moderate leadership over policy, including the union's pro-employer attitude.

The union contested the 1947 elections, nominating seven candidates for the 14 elected seats in the Legislative Council, campaigning for the nationalisation of industry and the introduction of land settlement schemes. However, it won only one seat.

In April 1948 the Guiana Industrial Workers Union (GIWU) was formed, with the intention of replacing the MPCA as the major union for field and factory workers; sugar workers had become disillusioned with the MPCA, which offered little resistance to the SPA. During a strike in the same month, the MPCA urged strikers to return to work, claiming their demands would be discussed with the SPA. However, strikers ignored the call, despite the SPA saying they would only deal with the MPCA as the only recognised union. By the end of 1948, the GIWU had the support of the majority of sugar workers.

In the 1953 elections the union supported the National Democratic Party. In 1955 Rupert Tello became the union's president, replacing Lionel Luckhoo. From 1960, the union's leaders supported the new United Force party led by Peter d'Aguiar.

During the early 1960s the unrecognised Guiana Agricultural Workers Union demanded that a poll take place amongst sugar workers to decide whether they or the MPCA should represent their interests. The MPCA and the SPA opposed a poll. Following a strike in 1964, Prime Minister Jagan asked Governor Ralph Grey to undertake a poll. Although Grey refused, he later formed a commission of enquiry to determine which union should be the workers' representative. The MPCA immediately filed an injunction at the Supreme Court to block the enquiry. The enquiry was later abandoned with Jagan lost power.
