= House of Assembly (British Guiana) =

Former British Guianan House of Assembly

The House of Assembly was the legislature of British Guiana in the 1950s and 1960s.

== History ==
The House of Assembly was established as a result of the Waddington Commission, which led to the enactment of constitutional reforms in 1952; universal suffrage was introduced and the Legislative Council was to be replaced by the House of Assembly. The new House had 28 members; 24 members elected in single member constituencies, a speaker appointed by the Governor and three ex officio members (the Chief Secretary, the Attorney General and the Financial Secretary). The term of the final Legislative Council was extended in order to allow preparations for elections under the new system on 27 April 1953.

The elections were won by the People's Progressive Party (PPP) led by Cheddi Jagan, who became Prime Minister, whilst Eustace Gordon Woolford was appointed Speaker of the new House. Its first meeting was held on 18 May. After assuming power Jagan embarked on implementing a series of policies that involved radical social reform, mainly directed at the colonial oligarchy. The British colonial authorities sent in troops in response to the alleged threat of a Marxist revolution. Governor Alfred Savage suspended the constitution on 9 October (only 133 days after it had come into force); the House of Assembly was prorogued, before being dissolved on 21 December. A wholly appointed Interim Legislative Council was established in place of the Assembly.

Constitutional reforms in 1964 led to the re-establishment of the House of Assembly as a replacement for the bicameral Legislature, which had been created in 1961. The new House was a 54-seat body, consisting of 53 elected members and the Speaker. The elections were held on 7 December 1964 using proportional representation to allocate the seats, and although the PPP won the most seats, the People's National Congress (PNC) and United Force were able to form a coalition government with a working majority. Despite losing the elections, Jagan refused to resign as Prime Minister, and had to be removed by Governor Richard Luyt, with Forbes Burnham replacing him. The new House met for the first time on 31 December, although the meeting was boycotted by the PPP. Aubrey Percival Alleyne of the PNC was elected Speaker, and subsequently vacated his seat, allowing Philip Duncan of the PNC to take his place.

On 26 May 1966 the country became independent under the name of Guyana. A new constitution came into force, replacing the House of Assembly with the National Assembly.

== List of members ==
=== 1953 ===
Post	Member		
Appointed
Speaker	Eustace Gordon Woolford		
Chief Secretary	John Gutch		
Attorney General	Frank Wilfred Holder		
Financial Secretary	Walter Ogle Fraser		
Elected
Constituency	Member	Party	Notes
1 – North West	William Alfred Phang	Independent	
2 – Pomeroon	Thomas Sherwood Wheating	Independent	
3 – Western Essequibo	Janet Jagan	People's Progressive Party	Deputy Speaker
4 – Essequibo Islands	Theophilus Lee	Independent	
5 – Bartica and Interior	Eugene Francis Correia	National Democratic Party	
6 – Demerara-Essequibo	Fred Bowman	People's Progressive Party	
7 – West Bank Demerara	Jai Narine Singh	People's Progressive Party	Minister of Local Government and Social Welfare
8 – East Bank Demerara	Joseph Prayag Lachhmansingh	People's Progressive Party	Minister of Health and Housing
9 – Upper Demerara River	Charles Albert Carter	Independent	
10 – Georgetown South	Ashton Chase	People's Progressive Party	Minister of Labour, Industry and Commerce
11 – Georgetown South Central	Clinton Reginald Wong	People's Progressive Party	
12 – Georgetown Central	Jessie Irma Sampson Burnham	People's Progressive Party	
13 – Georgetown North	Frank Obermuller van Sertima	People's Progressive Party	
14 – Georgetown North-East	Forbes Burnham	People's Progressive Party	Minister of Education
15 – West Central Demerara	Ram Karran	People's Progressive Party	
16 – Central Demerara	Sydney Evanson King	People's Progressive Party	Minister of Communications and Works
17 – East Central Demerara	Jane Phillips-Gay	People's Progressive Party	
18 – Mahaica-Mahaicony	Chandra Sama Persaud	People's Progressive Party	
19 – Western Berbice	Samuel Mahabali Latchmansingh	People's Progressive Party	
20 – New Amsterdam	Rudy Kendall	National Democratic Party	
21 – Berbice River	Ajodha Singh	People's Progressive Party	
22 – Eastern Berbice	Robert Stanley Hanoman Singh	People's Progressive Party	
23 – Corentyne Coast	Cheddi Jagan	People's Progressive Party	Leader of the House and Minister of Agriculture, Forests, Lands and Mines
24 – Corentyne River	Mohamed Khan	People's Progressive Party	

=== 1964–1966 ===
Member	Party	Notes	Member	Party	Notes
Government			Other		
Forbes Burnham	People's National Congress	Premier, Minister of Development & Planning	Aubrey Percival Alleyne	–	Speaker
Ptolemy Reid	People's National Congress	Minister of Home Affairs	Cheddi Jagan	People's Progressive Party	
Neville James Bissember	People's National Congress	Minister of Health and Housing	Brindley Benn	People's Progressive Party	
Randolph Emanuel Cheeks	The United Force	Minister of Local Government	Ram Karran	People's Progressive Party	
Eugene Francis Correia	People's National Congress	Minister of Communications	Ranji Chandisingh	People's Progressive Party	
Peter d'Aguiar	The United Force	Minister of Finance	Jocelyn Hubbard	People's Progressive Party	
Winifred Gaskin	People's National Congress	Minister of Education, Youth, Race Relations & Community Development	Charles Ramkissoon Jacob	People's Progressive Party	
C.M. Llewellyn John	People's National Congress	Minister of Agriculture	Cedric Vernon Nunes	People's Progressive Party	
Robert James Jordan	People's National Congress	Minister of Forests, Lands and Mines	Fenton Harcourt Wilworth Ramsahoye	People's Progressive Party	
Mohamed Kasim	The United Force	Minister of Works and Hydraulics	Eugene Martin Stoby	People's Progressive Party	
Rudy Kendall	People's National Congress	Minister of Trade and Industry	Earl Maxwell Gladstone Wilson	People's Progressive Party	
Deoroop Mahraj	People's National Congress	Minister without Portfolio	George Bowman	People's Progressive Party	
Claude Alfonso Merriman	People's National Congress	Minister of Labour and Social Security	Sheik Mohamed Saffee	People's Progressive Party	
Stephen Campbell	The United Force	Ministry of Home Affairs	Ashton Chase	People's Progressive Party	
David Brandis deGroot	People's National Congress		Moses Bhagwan	People's Progressive Party	
William Alexander Blair	People's National Congress		John Bernard Caldeira	People's Progressive Party	
Jagnarine Budhoo	People's National Congress		Abdul Maccie Hamid	People's Progressive Party	
Charles Frederick Chan-A-Sue	People's National Congress		Derek Chunilall Jagan	People's Progressive Party	
Oscar Eleazar Clarke	People's National Congress		Goberdhan Harry Lall	People's Progressive Party	
Royden George Basil Field-Ridley	People's National Congress		Yacoob Ally	People's Progressive Party	
John Gabriel Joaquin	People's National Congress		Lloyd Linde	People's Progressive Party	
Hari Prashad	The United Force		Joseph Rudolph Spenser Luck	People's Progressive Party	
Thomas Anson Sancho	People's National Congress		Reepu Daman Persaud	People's Progressive Party	
Rupert Tello	The United Force		Mohendernauth Poonai	People's Progressive Party	
James Henry Thomas	People's National Congress		Subhan Ali Ramjohn	People's Progressive Party	
Cyril Victor Too Chung	The United Force				
Alex Benjamin Trotman	People's National Congress				
Henry Milton Shakespeare Wharton	People's National Congress				
Philip Duncan	People's National Congress	Replacement for the Speaker			
