= Jessie Burnham =

Guyanese educator and politician

Member of the House of Assembly
- In office 1953–1957
- Constituency: Georgetown Central

Jessie Irma Sampson Burnham was a Guyanese educator and politician. In 1953 she was elected to the House of Assembly alongside Janet Jagan and Jane Phillips-Gay, becoming its first female members.

== Biography ==
Burnham grew up on Pike Street in the Kitty district of Georgetown, where her father was a member of the village council and headteacher of the local Methodist school. She trained to be a teacher and worked at the Bedford Methodist school.

In the 1953 elections to the House of Assembly, Burnham was a candidate of the People's Progressive Party (PPP) in Georgetown Central. She was one of three women elected to the House alongside Janet Jagan and Jane Phillips-Gay, who became the first women in a Guyanese legislature. Her brother Forbes was also elected, and went on to become the first Prime Minister of Guyana. However, Jessie was not re-elected in the August 1957 elections. In October 1957 the siblings left the PPP to establish the People's National Congress (PNC), with Forbes as leader and Jessie as an assistant secretary. However, she left the party the following year. After rejoining the PPP, she published a booklet in 1964 with the title Beware My Brother.
