= MPCA =

MPCA may refer to:

- Madhya Pradesh Cricket Association, the governing body of cricket activities in the Indian state of Madhya Pradesh
- Manpower Citizens' Association, a trade union in Guyana
- Minnesota Pollution Control Agency, a Minnesota state agency
- Motion Picture Corporation of America, an American film production company
- Multilinear principal component analysis, a mathematical procedure
