= Forbes Burnham =

Leader of Guyana from 1964 to 1985

Forbes Burnham OE
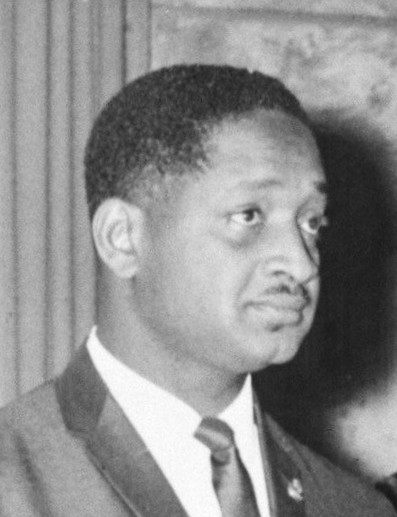
- Burnham in 1966

2nd President of Guyana
- In office 6 October 1980 – 6 August 1985
- Prime Minister: Desmond Hoyte; Ptolemy Reid
- Vice President: Desmond Hoyte; Ptolemy Reid; Shiw Sahai Naraine; Hamilton Green; Bishwaishwar Ramsaroop; Mohamed Shahabuddeen; Ranji Chandisingh
- Preceded by: Arthur Chung
- Succeeded by: Desmond Hoyte

1st Prime Minister of Guyana (British Guiana until 1966)
- In office 14 December 1964 – 6 October 1980
- Monarch: Elizabeth II
- President: Arthur Chung
- Preceded by: Cheddi Jagan
- Succeeded by: Ptolemy Reid

Personal details
- Born: Linden Forbes Sampson Burnham; 20 February 1923 Kitty, Georgetown, Demerara County, British Guiana
- Died: 6 August 1985 (aged 62) Georgetown, Demerara-Mahaica, Guyana
- Resting place: Guyana Botanical Gardens
- Party: BGLP (1949); PPP (1950–1958); PNC (from 1958)
- Height: 1.88 m (6 ft 2 in)
- Spouses: Sheila Bernice Lataste (m. 1951; div. 1966); Viola Victorine Harper (m. 1967)
- Relations: Jessie Burnham (sister)
- Children: 6
- Education: University of London
- Nickname: "Odo"

Linden Forbes Sampson Burnham OE (20 February 1923 – 6 August 1985) was a Guyanese politician and the leader of the Co-operative Republic of Guyana from 1964 until his death in 1985. He served as Premier of British Guiana from 1964 to 1966, Prime Minister of Guyana from 1964 to 1980 and then as the first executive president of Guyana (2nd president overall) from 1980 to 1985. He is often regarded as a strongman dictator who embraced his own version of socialism and ethnocentrism.

Educated as a lawyer, Burnham was instrumental in the foundation of two political parties (the People's National Congress and the People's Progressive Party) that would come to dominate the politics of Guyana. During his time as head of government, Guyana moved from being a British colony to being a republic with no constitutional ties to the United Kingdom. His premiership was characterized by the nationalisation of foreign-owned private industries, membership of the Non-Aligned Movement and authoritarian domestic policy. Despite being widely regarded as having a significant role in the political, social, and economic development of Guyana, his presidency was marred by accusations of Afrocentrism, state-sanctioned violence, corruption, and electoral fraud.

== Early life and education ==
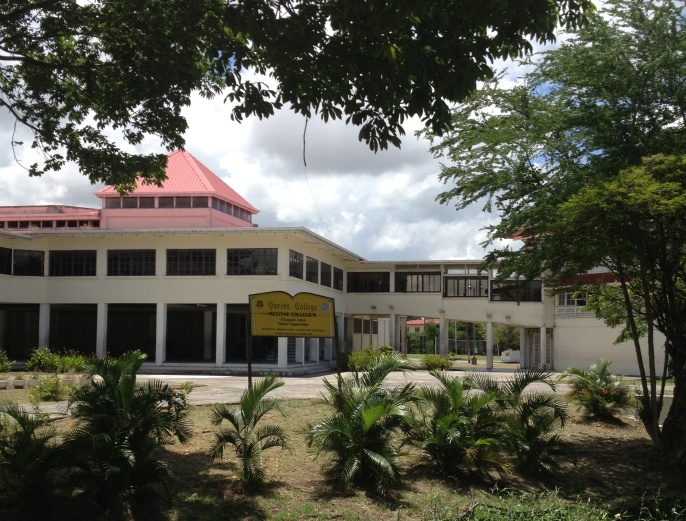
Queen's college, which Burnham attended and where he later worked as an assistant master

Burnham was born in Kitty, a suburb of Georgetown, Demerara County, British Guiana, as one of three or four (Olga, Freddie, Jessie, and Flora) children. His parents were James Ethelbert Burnham, a schoolmaster, and Rachel Abigail Sampson, and he grew up in an Afro-Guyanese, Methodist household. Burnham's father had his roots in a slave family from Barbados, and his family name came from the surname of the plantation owner. On the abolition of slavery, Burnham's ancestor migrated to British Guiana.

According to Burnham's sister Jessie, the family grew up on 4 Pike Street, Kitty. Jessie also attests that their father was the headteacher at Kitty Methodist School for 37 years, and sat on the Village Council. Forbes Burnham attended Kitty Methodist School and Central High School before attending the prestigious secondary school, Queen's College, where he met future political rival Cheddi Jagan. His sister said that Burnham was ambitious from a young age, and that he was bullied at Central High School for his small stature and academic prowess. At Queen's College, Burnham excelled academically, receiving the Centenary Exhibition (1936), the Government Junior (1937), and the Percival Exhibition (1938).

In 1942, he won the British Guiana Scholarship to study at the University of London, as the top student in British Guiana. Burnham was unable to travel to the United Kingdom due to World War II, instead working as an assistant master at Queen's college and completing a Bachelor of Arts degree from the University of London through external examinations. After he was allowed to travel to London, Burnham received a law degree from the London School of Economics, at the time a constituent college of the University of London, in 1947 or 1948 and was the president of the West Indian Student Union at the university for the year 1947–1948 He went on to pass the bar in 1948, and became a member of Gray's Inn. Burnham met many African and Caribbean students – including Abubakar Tafawa Balewa of Nigeria, Seretse Khama of Botswana and Kwame Nkrumah of Ghana as well as Michael Manley of Jamaica and Errol Barrow of Barbados – during his studies in London.

In London, Burnham won the Best Speaker's Cup, awarded by the Faculty of Law. He also attended the Student's Congresses in Prague and Paris, and was a member of the League of Coloured Peoples.

He left the United Kingdom to return to British Guiana on 20 December 1948, departing Liverpool on the Empress of France bound for Halifax, Nova Scotia, and arrived in Georgetown in 1949.

== 1949–1955: The People's Progressive Party (PPP) ==
=== Founding the People's Progressive Party ===
In 1949, after returning from his studies in the United Kingdom, Burnham entered the private law chambers of Cameron and Shepherd before setting up his own private law practice, Clarke and Martin. Also in 1949, Burnham became the leader of the British Guiana Labour Party (BGLP), which had been formed in 1946. In the 1947 elections the Labour Party had won 5 of 14 seats in the Legislative Council, making them the largest party.

Less than a year after his return from the United Kingdom, Burnham was one of the founders of the People's Progressive Party (PPP), which was launched on 1 January 1950. The Indo-Guyanese labour leader Cheddi Jagan became Leader of the PPP, Jagan's wife Janet Jagan became the secretary and Burnham became the first party chairman. Jagan had been the leader of the Political Affairs Committee, which merged with the BGLP to form the PPP. Burnham chose the name of the new party.

=== Minister of Education ===
In 1952, Burnham became the president of the party's affiliated trade union, the British Guiana Labour Union, and was elected to Georgetown City Council in 1953. In the 1953 British Guiana general election on 27 April 1953, the PPP won 18 of 24 seats in the first election with universal suffrage in Guyana, with both Burnham and his sister Jessie elected to the House of Assembly. In the short-lived PPP government that followed, Burnham served as Minister of Education. Burnham initially threatened to split the party if he were not made sole leader of the PPP, but a compromise was reached by which Burnham and his allies in the party received ministerial appointments. The newly formed government began to dissent against colonial rule, refusing to send a delegation to the Coronation of Queen Elizabeth II, urging strike action and repealing several laws which the Colonial Office wanted in place. This dissent took place during the Red Scare, and British statesmen were worried about a possible communist revolution in Guyana; Winston Churchill remarked that "(W)e ought surely to get American support in doing all we can to break the Communist teeth in British Guiana … (P)erhaps they would even send Senator McCarthy down there."

On 9 October 1953, the British administration suspended the Constitution of British Guiana and sent in armed troops after the PPP government passed the Labour Relations Act (modelled on the Wagner Act) the day before, marking the end of the PPP government. Burnham and Jagan would travel to London to unsuccessfully protest the decision, where they were subject to secret surveillance by British intelligence services. Following this, Burnham and Jagan travelled to India in an unsuccessful attempt to find support for their cause against the British. The interim government appointed by the British would last until 1957.

During the suspension of the constitution, the interim government gave Burnham fewer restrictions than other senior members of the party, he was not imprisoned while the other senior members were, and he was given tacit encouragement to begin a breakaway faction within the party, which he would do two years later.

== 1955–1964: Leader of the People's National Congress (PNC) ==
=== Origins of the People's National Congress ===
At a conference at the Metropole Cinema in Georgetown on 12–13 February 1955, the PPP split into two factions, one led by Burnham ("Burnhamite") and the other by Jagan ("Jaganite"). Jagan supported a socialist domestic policy, but Burnham's faction was more moderate. The two also had personality differences. After the 1957 election, where Jagan's faction won 9 seats and Burnham's won only 3, Burnham went on to form the People's National Congress (PNC) in 1957, becoming leader of the opposition. The PNC entered its first election under that name in 1961. Also in 1957, Burnham became President of the Guyana Bar Association, a position he would hold until 1964. In 1959, Burnham was elected Mayor of Georgetown, a position he would hold until 1964 when he was re-elected until 1966. The United Democratic Party merged with the PNC in 1959.

The political split deepened the racial division between Afro-Guyanese and Indo-Guyanese. Guyanese politics continues to largely follow racial lines, with PPP support mainly of a [Indian] background and PNC support mostly of African descent. This would follow the rural-urban divide as well, Afro-Guyanese tending to live in urban-coastal areas and Indo-Guyanese tending to live in rural-interior areas. After the split, Jagan's PPP and Burnham's PNC largely became the political expressions of the Indo-Guyanese and Afro-Guyanese aspirations respectively, and advocated for their supporter's interests.

=== 1961 general election ===
In the 1961 election, Burnham's PNC party won 11 seats in the Legislative Assembly with 41% of the vote. Despite only winning 1.64% more of the vote than the PNC, the PPP won 20 seats, nearly double the number of seats won by the PNC. This led to mass demonstrations, racial tensions and a general strike. The Governor declared a state of emergency and British troops were deployed.

=== The Kaldor Budget and Black Friday ===
On 31 January 1962 the PPP government announced what would later be known as the "Kaldor Budget", advised by economist Nicholas Kaldor, including an increase in tax and import duty, which was opposed by opposition parties, who started taking action against the government, including mass demonstrations led by the PNC. According to the Wynn Parry Commission, on 12 February, Burnham gave the following speech: "Comrades, the fight starts now. Tomorrow at 2 o'clock in the afternoon there is a demonstration organized by the Trade Union Congress, a demonstration against the harsh proposals of the budget, which make life unbearable. No doubt the Riot Squad will be there. Do you still want to go? Comrades, remember that tomorrow Jagan's army is coming down from Cane Grove and Windsor Forest. Do you still want to go?" the mass action would culminate 16 February 1962, later called "Black Friday". 56 businesses were destroyed, 87 damaged by fire and 66 were looted. One Police Superintendent was killed and 39 injured, while four looters were fatally shot and 41 injured. The rioters also attacked the Electricity Plant, the Water Works, Parliament, and Jagan's residence. The riots were responded to by HMS Troubridge (R00) and HMS Wizard (R72). Black smoke covered Georgetown and a large fire was evident.

=== International intervention in British Guiana ===
According to declassified documents, in the early 1960s the United States Government led by John F. Kennedy became increasingly convinced that Jagan's PPP government had communist ideals. Due to the radical views of Cheddi Jagan (who leaned towards communism) and Jagan's alliances with the Soviet Union and Cuba, Burnham was supported by Western nations. In May 1962 Kennedy held direct talks with British prime minister Harold Macmillan, and Burnham visited Washington D.C.. Senior officials in the United States decided that Burnham's proposed socialism was preferable to Jagan's ideology, but also concluded that Jagan would become Head of Government of an independent Guyana without US intervention. Burnham readily agreed to US action against Jagan. In 1962, Kennedy approved intervention against Jagan's government. Independence was delayed by British officials, allowing time for a covert operation by the Central Intelligence Agency. Both Peter D'Aguiar (leader of the third largest party, The United Force) and Burnham pledged to support the notion of proportional representation (opposed by Jagan), and Burnham began to receive financial aid from the CIA.

Burnham was appointed President of the Guyana Labour Union in 1963.

The CIA has been accused of assisting strike action against the PPP government beginning in 1963. This action would eventually turn to violence, with arson and bombing at government buildings. Burnham was mentioned in police reports.

=== Lead up to the 1964 election ===
In 1963, further talks between President Kennedy and British prime minister Macmillan led to the British decision to impose a December 1964 election using proportional representation, after which British Guiana would be granted independence. The Americans received assurances from Burnham and D'Aguiar that they would mutually support each other in the election, and US money would be used for political campaigning. The lead-up to the election was marked by widespread violence, with nearly 200 murders and 2,600 families displaced. A series of racially-motivated incidents took place in and around Linden, including the Wismar Massacre on 26 May, the sinking of the Sun Chapman on 6 July and the following murders of 5 Indo-Guyanese individuals at Mackenzie. In one incident in August 1964, Jagan, Burnham, and d'Aguiar were conferring about reducing the spate of violence when the headquarters of the PPP were bombed just down the street.

Just before the election, the CIA estimated that the PPP and PNC would take about 40 percent of the vote, United Force would take 15 percent, and the false-flag Justice Party (aimed at Indo-Guyanese voters and backed by the CIA), would take 5 percent.

== 1964–1966: Premier of British Guiana ==
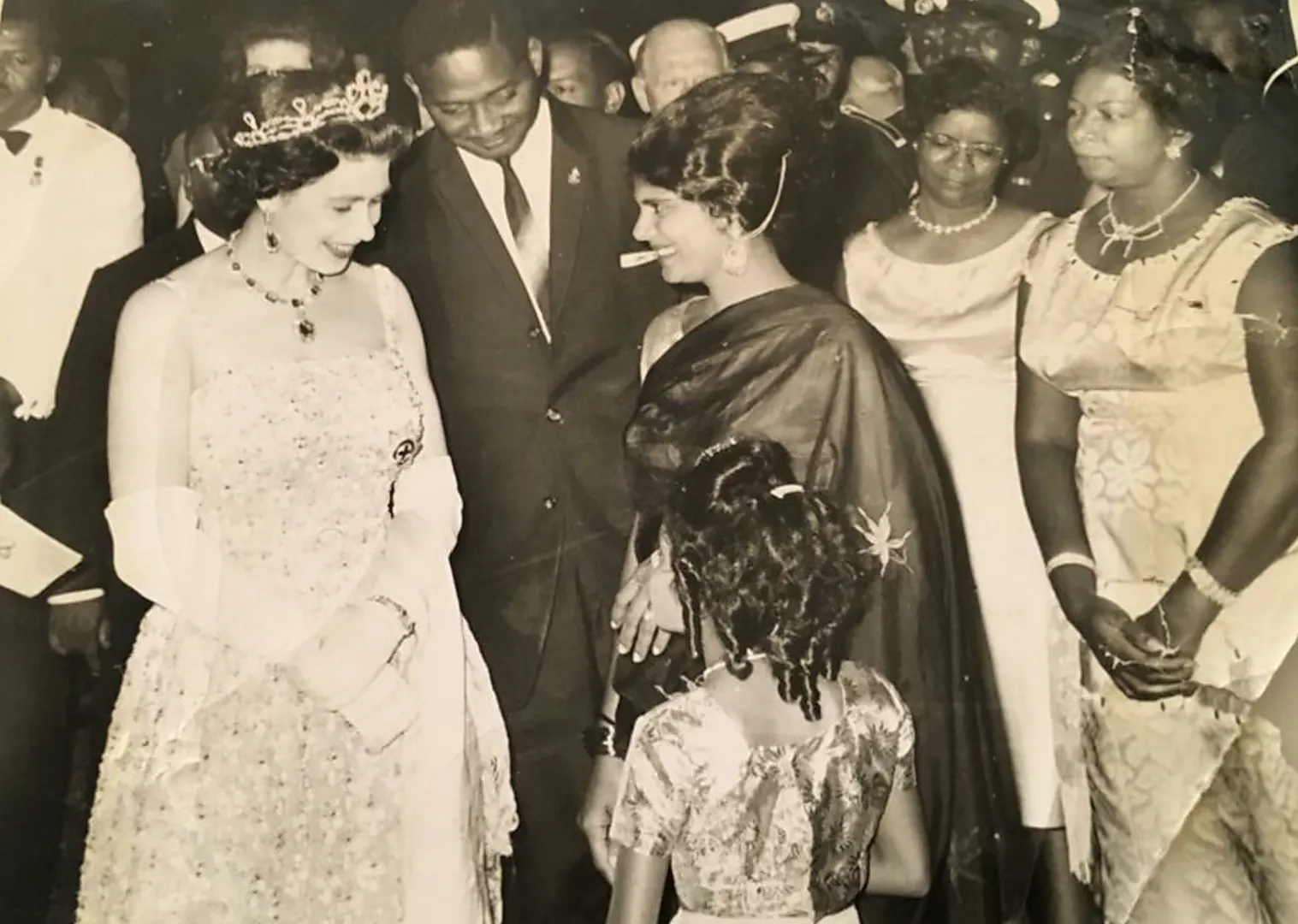
Burnham in the presence of Queen Elizabeth II in February 1966, during her state visit to British Guiana.

In the 1964 election on 7 December 1964, Jagan's PPP won the highest percentage of the vote (46% to the PNC's 41%), but it did not win a majority. Burnham succeeded in forming a coalition with The United Force (TUF), led by Peter D'Aguiar, which had won the remaining 12% of the votes, thereby becoming Premier on 14 December. Jagan refused to resign, and had to be removed by Governor Richard Luyt. Burnham would remain as Head of Government of Guyana for the next 21 years.

In 1965, Burnham along with Errol Barrow of Barbados were the founders of the Caribbean Free Trade Association (CARIFTA), which came into operation on 1 May 1968. CARIFTA was in 1973 superseded by CARICOM.

On 26 May 1966, British Guiana became an independent country and was renamed "Guyana". Under the post-independence Constitution, Queen Elizabeth II, now styled Queen of Guyana, was retained as titular head of state, represented in Guyana by the Governor-General, who served in a largely ceremonial capacity, with Forbes, now Prime Minister, as head of government, appointed by a majority in the National Assembly. However, the Constitution also made provision for a change to republican status to be made by a resolution of a majority of members of the Assembly at least 42 months after the date of independence, subject to a further three months before it was passed, a compromise between Burnham, who favoured a republic, and D'Aguiar, who favoured retaining the monarchy.

== 1966–1980: Prime Minister of Guyana ==
In one of Burnham's first acts upon independence, he passed a sweeping "National Security Act", permitting unrestricted search-and-seizure powers and the ability to detain individuals for up to 90 days without trial.

Burnham still had a significant electoral disadvantage, as voting support mostly followed racial lines, and about 50% of the Guyanese population on independence was Indo-Guyanese and would likely support Jagan's PPP, making a fair election nearly impossible to win for Burnham. A telegram from the US Ambassador stated that "he intends to remain in power indefinitely" and "if necessary, he is prepared to employ unorthodox methods to achieve his aims". In a meeting with US president Lyndon B. Johnson in July 1966, Burnham discussed a scheme to promote immigration of Afro-Caribbean people in an effort to improve his electoral chances in the 1968 election. This scheme was unsuccessful. In 1967, Burnham stated that "overseas vote figures could be manipulated pretty much as he wished". Burnham later stated that he would "identify and register all Guyanese of African ancestry in the United Kingdom, Canada, and the United States in order to get their absentee votes in the next election", and suggested that Indo-Guyanese living abroad may have trouble getting registered or receiving ballots.

In October 1966, Venezuelan soldiers occupied Ankoko Island in the disputed Essequibo territory. Burnham demanded the withdrawal of Venezuelan armed forces, but his request was denied.

=== 1968 general election ===
The PNC attained a majority government in the general elections of 1968 through electoral fraud, using an inflated "overseas vote" to skew the results in their favour. The PNC won 93.7% of the 36,745 overseas ballots, allowing Burnham to claim an absolute majority. An independent review by the Opinion Research Centre of London was only able to verify 15% of the entries on the overseas list. An investigation looking into the identity of some of the voters found that two horses near Manchester, a closed butcher's shop in Brooklyn and a railway in London had been counted as registered voters, and there were many addresses where the reported voters had never been resident. Only just over 100 voters of 900 checked in the United Kingdom were genuine, and in New York only 40% were genuine. Peter D'Aguiar called it "a seizure of power by fraud, not an election."

=== Rupununi Uprising and Tigri Area dispute ===
In 1968, a conference of 40,000 Amerindian people presented demands to Burnham, being dissatisfied with his afrocentrist policies. The Agriculture Minister declared that the inhabitants' land ownership certifications would no longer be recognized and the zone would be occupied by the Afro-Guyanese population. A provisional secessionist government was declared and attacks on Lethem began. The uprising was ultimately quelled by the Guyana Defence Force (GDF).

In 1969, following the establishment of Camp Tigri by Surinamese authorities, the GDF took Camp Tigri and asserted authority over the Tigri Area. Guyana continues to hold the camp despite a 1970 agreement to withdraw military forces.

=== Establishment of the Co-Operative Republic of Guyana ===
Before 1970, Burnham mostly pursued moderate political policies. However, in 1970, Burnham veered sharply to the left and established relations with Cuba (8 December 1972) and the Soviet Union (17 December 1970) and a strong relationship with North Korea. In 1969, as noted by one study, Burnham “declared his dissatisfaction with the free enterprise system and his willingness to embrace Marxism/Leninism.” On 23 February 1970, he declared Guyana a "co-operative republic". Adopting a policy of autarky, he banned all forms of imports into the country, including flour and varieties of rice that had been integral to the diet of Indo-Guyanese. Burnham also nationalised the major industries that were foreign-owned and -controlled. By 1979 his policies had reduced the private sector's share in the economy to only 10%. In declaring the Co-Operative republic, Burnham replaced the Head of State, removing the British monarch and installing Arthur Chung as the first president (in a mostly ceremonial role), though Guyana remained a member of the Commonwealth of Nations (Sonny Ramphal, Burnham's foreign minister from 1972-1975, became the second Commonwealth Secretary-General in 1975, and served in that post until 1990).

During an interview in September 1972, Burnham noted his opposition to capitalism and his belief in a socialist alternative for Guyana:

MARVIN X: Prime Minister, how did you come about the idea of a Co-operative Republic – does this idea have to do with the nature of how black people have always lived? PRIME MINISTER: Well, we reject the capitalist system! For us it has only meant domination and exploitation. We are socialists. We in Guyana wanted to find a vehicle that would involve the small man in the economy of the country, and give him, eventually, as dominate a role in the economy as he has in politics by virtue of the vote. And we identified the cooperative because its part of the history of the earliest Amerindians in this country; it’s part of the history of freed slaves in Guyana. In fact, where we are sitting here now, my house, is part of a village, Victoria, the first village in Guyana bought on a cooperative basis by freed black slaves. So far as Indians who came from India subsequently are concerned, also, they have a tradition of cooperatism. We thought the cooperative could be our instrument, giving as it does an opportunity to the ordinary man to participate, pooling his resources without us and with the assistance of government , being able to take ahold of the economy.

=== Port of Spain Protocol ===
On 18 June 1970 Burnham signed the Port of Spain Protocol with Venezuela. The protocol, in place for 12 years, promoted co-operation between the two countries on the Border Dispute in Guayana Esequiba. The protocol was not renewed after 12 years.

=== Membership of the Non-Aligned movement ===
Burnham, after attending the 1970 summit of the Non-Aligned Movement in Lusaka, Zambia, paid official visits to several African countries—Zambia, Uganda, Kenya, Tanzania and Ethiopia—over the period 12–30 September 1970. The Guyanese government remained fully involved in the African liberation movement throughout the 1970s.

Burnham sent more than a hundred Guyanese public servants to various departments of the Zambian Government. Many Guyanese doctors, engineers, lawyers and secretaries worked in Southern African states throughout the 1970s.

=== House of Israel ===
In 1972, Rabbi David Hill arrived in Guyana and established the House of Israel, a religious sect that the opposition accused of operating as a private army for Burnham's PNC. In 2014 Joseph Hamilton, a former House of Israel priest, testified that the House of Israel committed "oppressive and terrorizing acts on behalf of the PNC."

=== 1973 general election ===
In the 1973 general election, Burnham received 70% of the vote and 37 of the 53 seats in the National Assembly. It is generally accepted that Burnham had significant untoward influence on the results of the elections, making them fraudulent. During the transportation of ballot boxes by the military, the army shot dead two Indo-Guyanese poll workers, who became known as the "Ballot Box Martyrs". Shortly after the election, Burnham expanded powers of preventive detention, allowing restrictions on movement and possession of firearms, and search without warrant.

=== Declaration of Sophia ===
On 14 December 1974, Burnham issued the Declaration of Sophia, stating that "the Party should assume unapologetically its paramountcy over the Government which is merely one of its executive arms." The Declaration also called for a transition to a socialist state, and a nationalisation of its economy. The declaration also led to the founding of the Guyana National Service, a paramilitary organisation under the control of the party.

=== 1978 referendum ===
The PNC government's five-year term was due to end in 1978, forcing a new election. On 1 April 1978, Burnham announced a referendum to allow the constitution to be changed by a 2/3 majority in parliament (which the PNC had) rather than a referendum. The opposition presented a united front against the referendum. During the campaign, the PNC terminated the contract of critical newspaper "the Catholic Standard" with a state-owned printing company, hampering their ability to distribute critical material. Advertisements for opposition parties were banned in state media, and violence was used to break up opposition meetings and gatherings. Public employees were forced to sign blank proxy forms allowing others to vote on their behalf. It was also noted that there were over 10% (65,000) more people on the electoral role than the United Nations estimate of the number of eligible voters. The opposition groups eventually urged the Guyanese population to boycott the referendum. During this time, prominent Guyanese poet Martin Carter was beaten by individuals affiliated with the PNC while protesting the government's refusal to hold elections.

Burnham won the 1978 referendum. There are anecdotal claims from hundreds of Indo-Guyanese (and Afro-Guyanese who were PPP supporters) that PNC enforcers aggressively, often violently, denied PPP supporters the opportunity to vote. Official figures showed the referendum passing with an implausible 97.9 percent of the vote. There were accusations that PNC supporters voted multiple times.

A week later, on 17 July 1978, the government used its new powers to change the constitution to postpone the scheduled election. These powers were also used to introduce the new constitution introduced in 1980.

=== Involvement in Jonestown ===
On 18 November 1978, a total of 909 people of the Peoples Temple died in a mass suicide in Jonestown. Burnham had previously allowed the group, led by Jim Jones, to move to Guyana from San Francisco, US, and had a good relationship with the group. The incident drew international attention to Guyana, and an inquest established by the opposition blamed Burnham, considered to be an ally of Jones, for the deaths.

There are suggestions that Burnham's government participated in a cover-up of the affair. Burnham's wife Viola and his deputy prime minister Ptolemy Reid were among the first to the scene, and may have returned from the massacre site with nearly US$1 million in cash, gold and jewellery. One of Burnham's secretaries may also have visited Jonestown only hours before it occurred, a visit that was never explained.

=== 1979 Fire, and murder of Bernard Darke ===
In 1979, a fire destroyed many of the official government records, including official communications with the Peoples Temple. There is some speculation that the fire was started deliberately by Burnham's government, and there are reports that men in Guyana Defence Force uniforms were seen running from the fire. Two different government offices were burned. Walter Rodney was arrested and charged with arson. The trial was deferred three times, and later dropped due to lack of evidence.

During civil unrest after the fire and arrest, Jesuit priest Bernard Darke was stabbed to death by members of the House of Israel. Darke was associated with the Catholic Standard, a newspaper described as being "extremely critical" of the PNC. According to a 2013 article by Kaieteur News, the editor of Catholic News, Andrew Morrison, may have been the actual target of this attack, making it a failed assassination attempt.

== 1980–1985: President of the Co-Operative Republic of Guyana ==
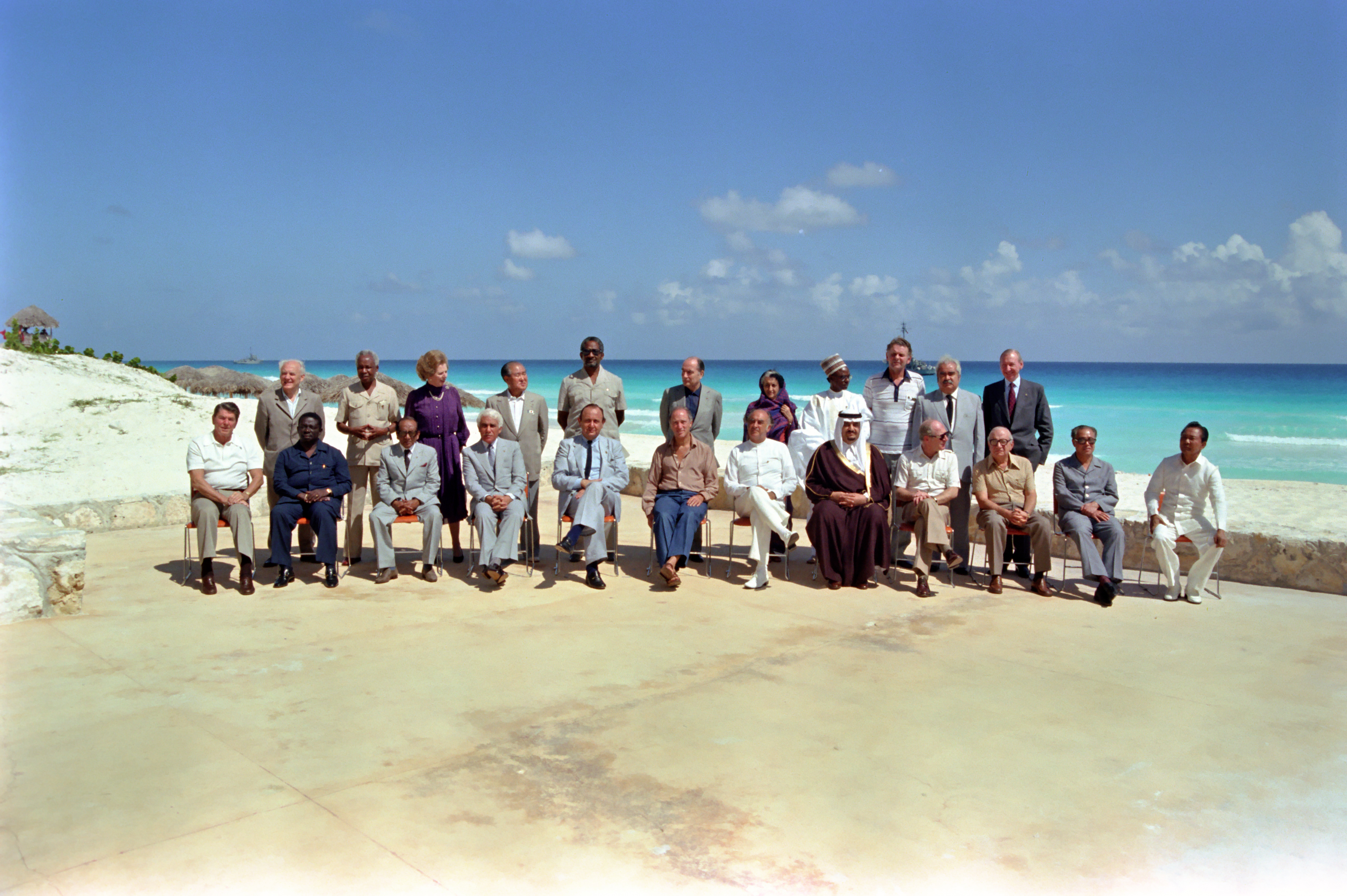
Heads of state at the 1981 Cancun Summit. Burnham is fifth from the left in the back row.

Forbes Burnham presidential standard

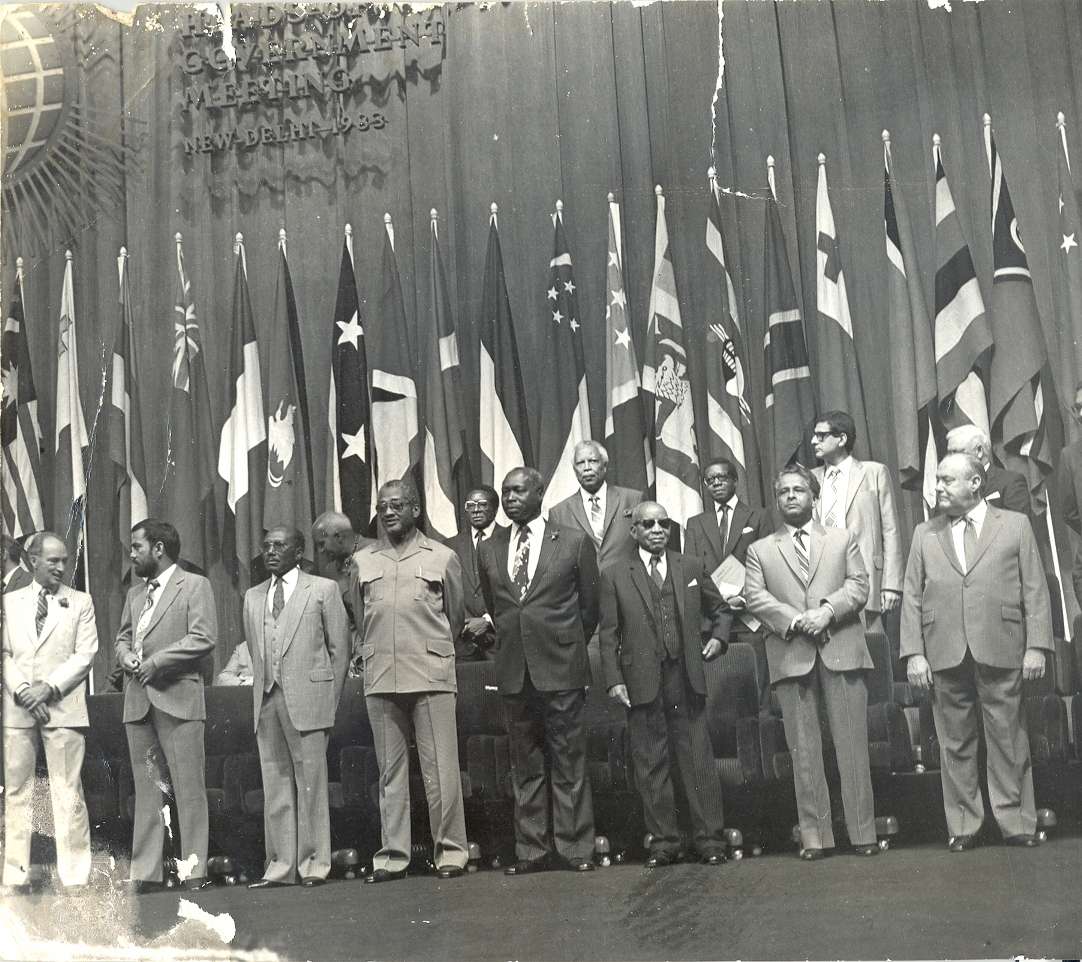
Burnham at a meeting of the Commonwealth Heads of Government in New Delhi, 1983 (Fourth from left)

In 1980 the constitution was changed to make the presidency an executive post; until this time the post had been held by Arthur Chung in a ceremonial head-of-state role. Burnham won election as president that year, winning 76% of the vote to 20% for Jagan in the official results. International Observers protested that Indo-Guyanese voters were prevented from voting in several polling locations, and there were widespread accusations of electoral fraud. The executive president was granted the powers to dissolve Parliament at will, veto legislation, and to appoint or dismiss almost all senior members of government. The new constitution declared the country to be a “cooperative republic…in transition from capitalism to socialism.”

Burnham introduced mass games to Guyana. They were first held in February 1980 to commemorate the founding of the Co-operative Republic of Guyana.

=== Assassination of Walter Rodney ===
Walter Rodney died on 13 June 1980 in Georgetown at the age of 38 in a car bomb explosion. His brother Donald, who was injured in the explosion, said that a sergeant in the Guyana Defence Force and a member of the House of Israel, named Gregory Smith, had given Rodney the bomb that killed him.

In 2014, Donald Ramotar launched an inquiry into the murder of Rodney despite resistance from the PNC. In 2016, the Commission of Inquiry released findings that state that President Forbes Burnham, aided by the Guyana Defence Force and Guyana Police Force, was part of the conspiracy to assassinate Rodney, the leader of the Working People's Alliance (WPA), a group which posed a threat to Burnham. Rodney's WPA believed that different ethnic groups (including Afro-Guyanese and Indo-Guyanese) historically disenfranchised by colonialism should all have a part in the governance of Guyana, a position that challenged Burnham's hold on power.

=== Last years of presidency ===
In the last years of Burnham's presidency, his quasi-socialist policies led to economic stagnation. Guyana was not able to export sufficient goods, especially Guyana's main exports, bauxite, rice and sugar, to earn the foreign exchange for vital imports, leading to a trade deficit and massive foreign debt. Commodity shortages and a near-breakdown in public services occurred, and Burnham enforced austerity measures and looked for economic support from Soviet-leaning countries. Burnham's authoritarian policies continued to lead to mass emigration, contributing to a net decrease in the population of Guyana that continued throughout the 1980s.

In Burnham's state-controlled economy, Afro-Guyanese held most jobs and the news media were controlled by the government. Jagan claimed that there was also economic suppression, as people remained politically inactive due to fear of losing their jobs. Burnham continued as president until his death in 1985.

== Political philosophy ==
Burnham's leadership was characterized by authoritarian rule. According to Walter Rodney, "Burnham's style of rule has many similarities with that of the late Nicaraguan dictator Anastasio Somoza. Somoza oppressed not only the exploited classes of his country but also sectors of his own class (the bourgeoisie) who refused to go along with his personal style of political domination."

Rodney referred to Burnham's political philosophy as "pseudo-socialism". Rival Cheddi Jagan said that "Burnham is like a cork in the ocean and moves with the tides." According to Manning Marable, "The Carter administration viewed Guyana in the same political league as Somalia and Communist China, a nominal socialist regime which outlawed democratic rights at home and was willing to become a junior partner with US imperialism."

Burnham was a supporter of the Non-Aligned Movement, which Guyana had joined in 1970. Membership of the Non-Aligned movement was seen as a cornerstone of Guyana's foreign policy. Burnham's other foreign policies included establishing maintaining membership and good relations within CARICOM (including being a founding member of CARIFTA and being the man behind the first 1972 Caribbean Festival of Arts) and in the Commonwealth of Nations. Burnham also advocated regionalism.

Burnham was staunchly opposed to South Africa's apartheid policies. On one occasion, English Cricketer Robin Jackman's visa was rescinded after his arrival in Georgetown due to his connections with apartheid in South Africa, and a boycott of the 1976 Summer Olympics was also put in place by Burnham in protest after the New Zealand national rugby union team had toured South Africa earlier in 1976 and were not banned by the International Olympic Committee. After Burnham's death, in 2013 the post-apartheid government in South Africa awarded Burnham the Order of the Companions of O. R. Tambo for his support of South African interests.

Burnham made all education, including tertiary education, free during his time in office.

Burnham was accused of corruption during his premiership by opposition parties. Walter Rodney said that "Burnham encourages around himself individuals who are weak or corrupt because he then exercises vicious control over them," and called his administration a "corrupt dictatorship".

=== Afrocentrist policies and accusations of racism ===
Burnham's administration has been accused of afrocentrist policies and discrimination against the Indian population. Burnham's administration was mostly Afro-Guyanese. The Guyanese armed forces under the Burnham administration were majority Afro-Guyanese after Burnham purged the armed forces of Indo-Guyanese from 1968, and under the state-controlled economy Afro-Guyanese took up the majority of jobs despite being a minority of the population. The resettlement of Afro-Guyanese in Amerindian lands was a major contributing factor in the Rupununi Uprising.

Guyanese journalist Freddie Kissoon expressed the opinion that Burnham was not racist, but was aware that his support was predominantly Afro-Guyanese, the Indo-Guyanese mostly supported Jagan, so that Burnham had to deliver policies to please the Afro-Guyanese racial group and maintain his popular support. Kissoon went on to criticise Burnham for his authoritarian policies regardless of intention, stating that "The reign of Forbes Burnham was frightening and demoralizing" and also stating that during Burnham's tenure "almost 99 percent of Indian Guyanese felt that Guyana had no place for them, and that its president and his party were treating them as second-class citizens," and that Indo-Guyanese "lived in fear of Burnham".

Walter Rodney wrote in an essay that a pamphlet by Jessie Burnham described Forbes' "racist attitude towards Indians". In the pamphlet, a letter is shown in which Burnham writes "I feel strongly about the Indian attitude but the time has not come yet for me to broadcast those feelings". In 1962, Arthur M. Schlesinger Jr. stated that Burnham was regarded as racist by the US state department and British colonial office.

=== Authoritarian policies ===
Burnham passed many authoritarian policies during his tenure, starting with the "National Security Act" after independence. Burnham would pass laws to restrict movement, increase police powers to search and detain, and restrict firearms. He would come to tightly control media coverage. He would also make constitutional changes that would provide him with the power to veto legislation, make further constitutional changes without a referendum, control governmental appointments and dissolve parliament.

=== Role in state-sanctioned violence ===
In 2016, Burnham's government was found to be complicit in the assassination of Walter Rodney and has been accused of using violence to break up opposition meetings and gatherings, being complicit in the deliberate arson of government buildings, and having a role in the Murder of Bernard Darke. Burnham was Head of Government when the army killed two Indo-Guyanese poll workers in 1973 (the "Ballot Box Martyrs").

Prior to taking control of the Guyanese government, Burnham was mentioned in police reports in the violent demonstrations of 1963, and his PNC party was accused of leading the mobs that caused extensive property damage in the Black Friday riots of 1962.

=== Covert involvement with the CIA ===
According to declassified documents from the National Security Archive, From 1962 to 1968 Burnham was provided with support from the US Central Intelligence Agency. During this time, Burnham agreed to CIA intervention in Guyana, and received financial assistance in the lead-up to both the 1964 and 1968 elections.

== Personal life ==
Burnham's sister Jessie Burnham was also active in politics, and was one of the first female members of the House of Assembly.

Burnham's first marriage was to Trinidadian Sheila Bernice Lataste-Burnham, having met her in London when they were both students. Lataste was born in Woodbrook. They married in Tranquility Methodist Church, Port of Spain in May 1951. With Lataste, Burnham had three children: Roxanne Van West Charles, Anabelle Pollard and Francesca Onu. The couple later divorced. Lataste-Burnham died in 2011 at the age of 91.

In February 1967 Burnham married high school Latin teacher Viola Victorine Harper (Viola Burnham), who also became involved in politics, serving as Vice President of Guyana under Desmond Hoyte. Viola died in 2003 at the age of 72. Burnham had two daughters with Viola, Melanie and Ulele, and adopted a son, Kamana.

Burnham was a Methodist by religion. His hobbies included swimming and horse-riding, and he also played chess, billiards, patience, cricket, tennis and fishing.

Burnham lived in Castellani House from 1965 to 1985, during which time it was referred to as "The Residence".

=== Personality ===
After a meeting in 1962, Thomas J. Dodd described Burnham as "an intelligent, well-educated gentleman". Arthur M. Schlesinger Jr., also in 1962, said that Burnham was regarded as "an unprincipled opportunist, racist and demagogue, only interested in personal power." Jessie Burnham described her brother as ambitious and manipulative. Neil L. Whitehead claimed in a book that Burnham was superstitious and engaged with obeah, employing an obeah advisor known as Mother Monica and devouring raw duck eggs and 100-year-old Chinese eggs to increase his potency or power.

== Death and burial ==
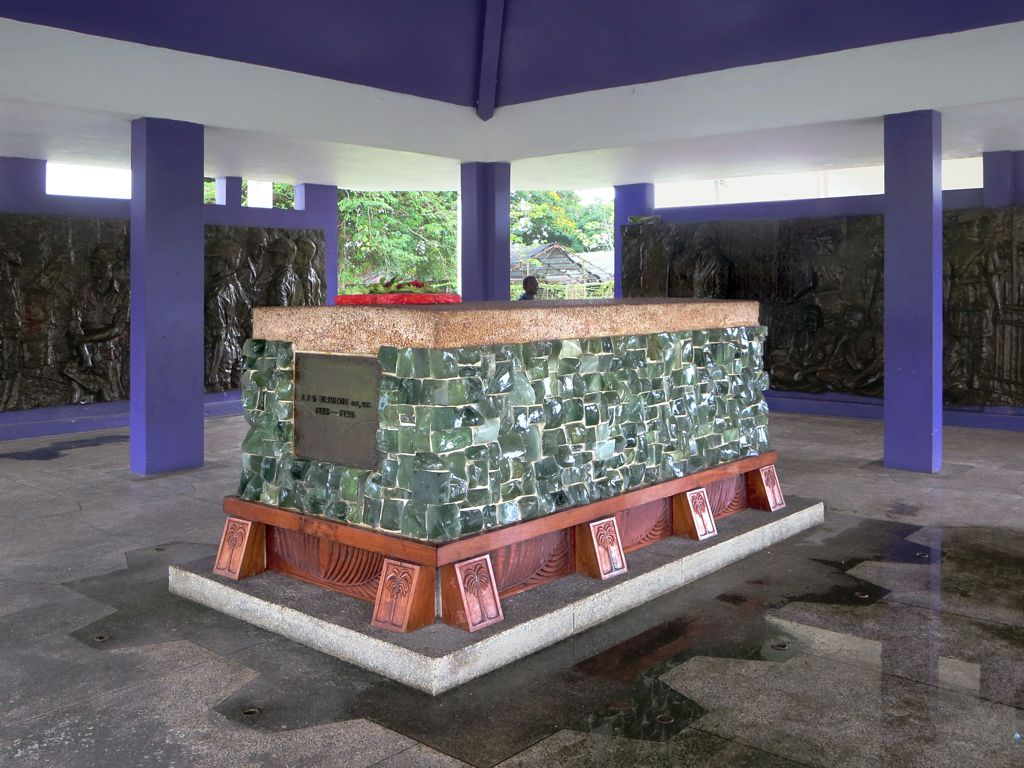
Tomb of President Forbes Burnham

Burnham died of heart failure during throat surgery in Georgetown on 6 August 1985 at the age of 62. Several sources suggest that Forbes had had heart problems in the years leading up to his death, and may have had diabetes. A man who worked for Burnham said he had heard that the president had had a "heart scare" about three and a half years before his death. The throat surgery was conducted with the assistance of two specialists from Cuba. He was buried in the Botanical Gardens a few days later. His body was later exhumed and taken to the Soviet Union to be preserved for permanent display. It was returned to Guyana for his final burial a year later. It was not explained why Burnham was having throat surgery' it was suggested he may have had a polyp, or throat cancer. There are also theories as to why Burnham's body was buried after being prepared for permanent open display.

His body is in Burnham's Mausoleum (built in 1986) in the Guyana Botanical Gardens in Georgetown. The Mausoleum is built mostly from reinforced concrete, with a floor of granite sourced from the Mazaruni and Upper Essequibo regions. It was designed by Guyanese architect George Henry in a crucifix shape. It is maintained by the National Trust of Guyana.

== Legacy ==
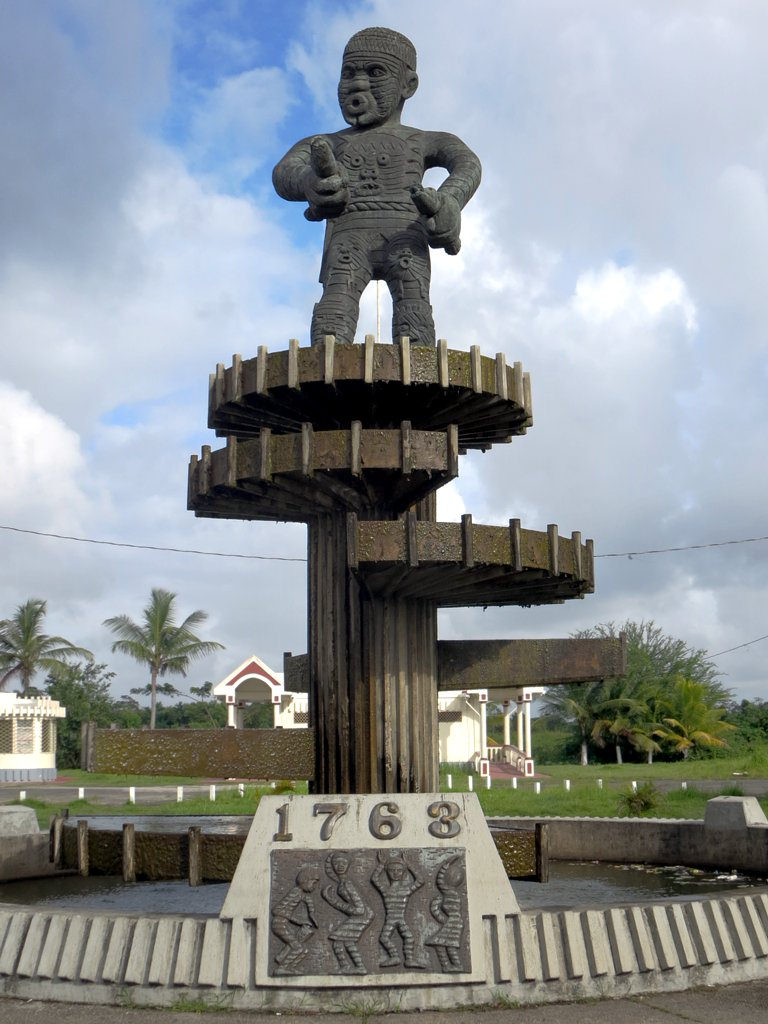
1763 monument, erected by Burnham's administration

Burnham is considered a controversial figure. Burnham's successor, Desmond Hoyte, called Burnham a "great leader". President of Guyana David A. Granger said "He was a brilliant man, a futuristic thinker, a man of honour, having integrity and a high degree of discipline," and Granger would call Burnham the "author of social cohesion and architect of national unity". Indira Gandhi named Burnham as one of the twentieth century's outstanding figures. Moe Taylor, a historian at the University of British Columbia, called Burnham's premiership a "deeply divisive chapter in Guyana's recent history." In a review of Burnham's rise to power published in 2020, John Prados characterised Burnham as "corrupt, arbitrary, and self-dealing", and referred to him as "a dictatorial figure".

As of 2022, the two political parties that Burnham founded remain the two most popular and influential parties in Guyanese politics, with Burnham's People's National Congress Reform party being the most important member in A Partnership for National Unity, and these two parties closely contesting the 2020 Guyanese general election. Support for the two parties continues to follow the racial divide between Afro-Guyanese and Indo-Guyanese.

Burnham's administration put in place many of the national symbols of Guyana during his premiership, including the Flag, the Coat of arms, the National Anthem, the national flower, national bird and the national motto. The 1763 monument to commemorate the Berbice slave uprising and the Non-aligned monument with busts of Nasser, Nkrumah, Nehru, and Tito were both erected during Burnham's premiership. Burnham instituted national holidays including Pagwah, Diwali and Mashramani. National projects completed during his premiership include the Soesdyke-Linden Highway, Demerara Harbour Bridge and Cheddi Jagan International Airport.

Burnham improved women's legal rights in Guyana with the release of the State Paper on Equality for Women in 1976, which was aimed at "securing equality of treatment by employers of men and women workers" and "making sex discrimination unlawful in employment, recruitment, training, education and the provision of housing, goods, services and facilities to the public." Burnham also opened the door to women serving in the Guyana Defence Force.

Guyana obtained massive debts during Burnham's tenure, experienced no GDP growth between 1973 and 1993, and experienced relatively high inflation of around 10% per year in the same period.

Following Burnham's death, Desmond Hoyte became president. The 1985 Guyanese general election was also considered to be fraudulent; the next "free and fair" election would come in 1992, the first fair election since 1964, where Cheddi Jagan was elected president. The Guyanese electoral process remains subject to voter fraud; the 2020 Guyanese general election was marred by an attempt by PNC leader David A. Granger to alter the results, with Bruce Golding stated he had "never seen a more transparent attempt to alter the result of an election."

== Awards ==
- Order of Excellence of Guyana (1973)
- Order of José Martí: Cuba (1975)
- Grand Cordon of the Order of the Nile: Egypt (1975)
- Honorary doctorate: Dalhousie University (1977)
- Ordem Nacional do Cruzeiro do Sul: Brazil (1983)
- Star of Planina (Order of the Balkan Mountains): Bulgaria (1984)
- Order of the Yugoslav Great Star: Yugoslavia (1985)
- Order of the Companions of O. R. Tambo: South Africa (2013)
- Order of the National Flag First Class: Democratic People's Republic of Korea

Political offices
Preceded by Cheddi Jagan	Prime Minister of Guyana (until 1966: British Guiana); 1964–1980	Succeeded by Ptolemy Reid
Preceded by Arthur Chung	President of Guyana; 1980–1985	Succeeded by Desmond Hoyte
