= 1964 British Guiana general election =

- 7 December 1964

53 seats in the House of Assembly 27 seats needed for a majority
- Registered: 247,604
- Turnout: 96.98%
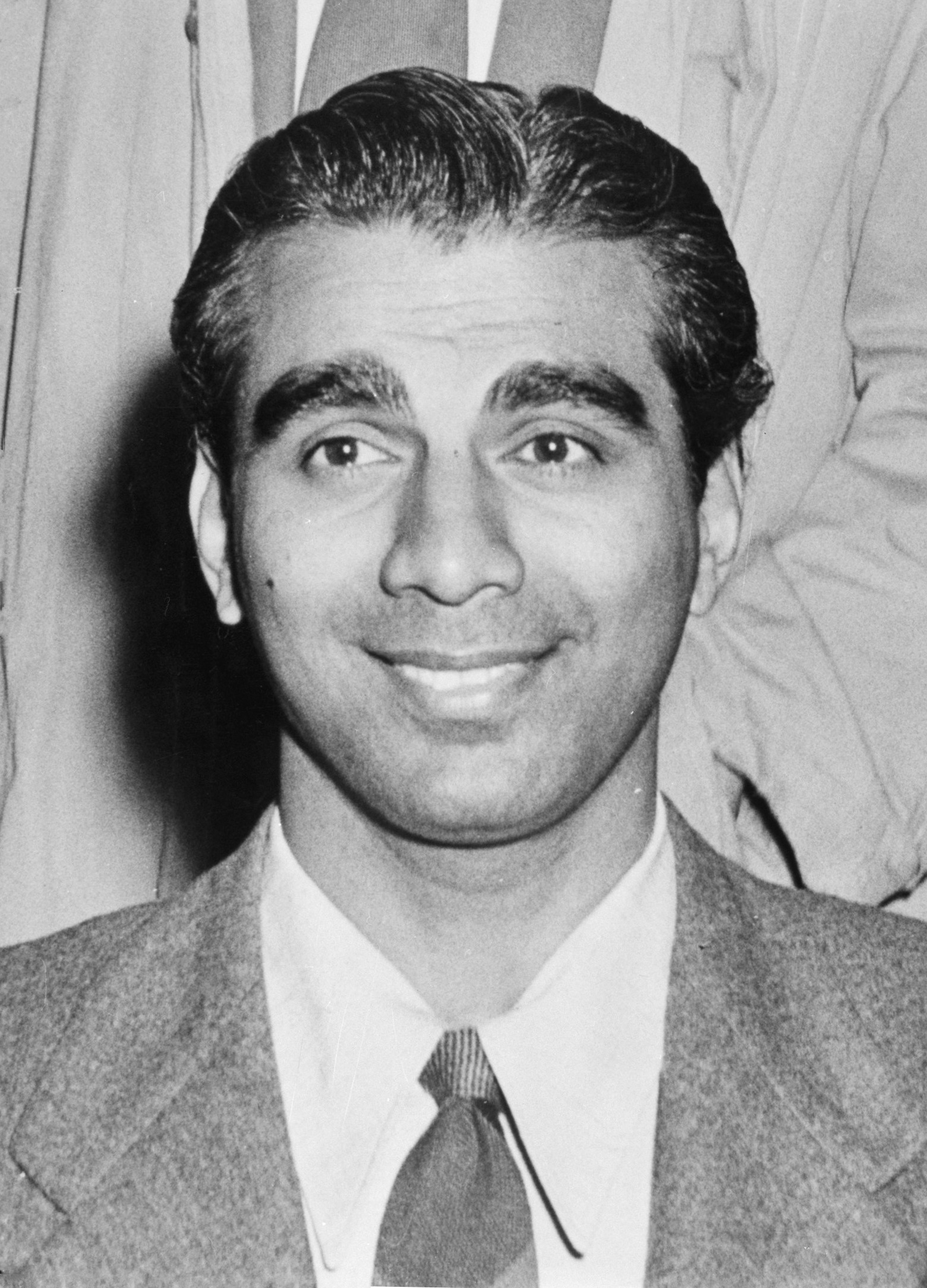

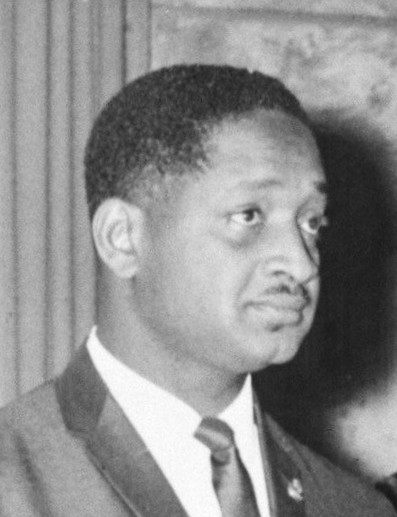
	First party	Second party	Third party
Leader	Cheddi Jagan	Forbes Burnham	Peter D'Aguiar
Party	PPP	PNC	TUF
Seats won	24	22	7
Seat change	▲4	▲11	▲3
Popular vote	109,332	96,657	29,612
Percentage	45.84%	40.52%	12.41%
Swing	▲3.21pp	▼0.47pp	▲3.97pp
Premier before election
Cheddi Jagan
PPP
Elected Premier
Forbes Burnham
PNC

General elections were held in British Guiana on 7 December 1964. They saw the People's Progressive Party (PPP) win 24 of the 53 seats. However, the People's National Congress (PNC) (22 seats) and United Force (UF) (7 seats) were able to form a coalition government with a working majority. Despite losing the elections, Prime Minister and PPP leader Cheddi Jagan refused to resign, and had to be removed by Governor Richard Luyt, with Forbes Burnham replacing him. Voter turnout was 97.0%.

== Electoral system ==
The elections followed constitutional reforms and the re-establishment of the House of Assembly, which had been abolished in 1953, replacing the bicameral Legislature. The House had 54 members; the Speaker and 53 members elected by proportional representation. The Speaker was elected from amongst the original elected members.

Four days prior to the election, Governor Richard Luyt declared that he would exercise his discretionary powers under the Royal prerogative to appoint the Premier after the election and that it might not be the leader of the party with the most votes. Jagan criticised the announcement, stating that the Governor had entered the political arena in a way that The Queen would never have done.

== Results ==
Party	Votes	%	Seats	+/–
People's Progressive Party	109,332	45.84	24	+4
People's National Congress	96,657	40.52	22	+11
United Force	29,612	12.41	7	+3
Justice Party	1,334	0.56	0	New
Guiana United Muslim Party	1,194	0.50	0	New
Peace, Equality and Prosperity Party	224	0.09	0	New
National Labour Front	177	0.07	0	New
Total	238,530	100.00	53	+18
Valid votes	238,530	99.34		
Invalid/blank votes	1,590	0.66		
Total votes	240,120	100.00		
Registered voters/turnout	247,604	96.98		
Source: Nohlen

=== Elected members ===
Member	Party	Notes
Cheddi Jagan	People's Progressive Party	
Brindley Benn	People's Progressive Party	
Ram Karran	People's Progressive Party	
Ranji Chandisingh	People's Progressive Party	
Henry Jocelyn Makepeace Hubbard	People's Progressive Party	
Charles Ramkissoon Jacob	People's Progressive Party	
Cedric Vernon Nunes	People's Progressive Party	
Fenton Harcourt Wilworth Ramsahoye	People's Progressive Party	
Eugene Martin Stoby	People's Progressive Party	
Earl Maxwell Gladstone Wilson	People's Progressive Party	
George Bowman	People's Progressive Party	
Sheik Mohamed Saffee	People's Progressive Party	
Ashton Chase	People's Progressive Party	
Moses Bhagwan	People's Progressive Party	
John Bernard Caldeira	People's Progressive Party	
Abdul Maccie Hamid	People's Progressive Party	
Derek Chunilall Jagan	People's Progressive Party	
Goberdhan Harry Lall	People's Progressive Party	
Yacoob Ally	People's Progressive Party	
Lloyd Linde	People's Progressive Party	
Joseph Rudolph Spenser Luck	People's Progressive Party	
Reepu Daman Persaud	People's Progressive Party	
Mohendernauth Poonai	People's Progressive Party	
Subhan Ali Ramjohn	People's Progressive Party	
Forbes Burnham	People's National Congress	Premier, Minister of Development & Planning
Ptolemy Reid	People's National Congress	Minister of Home Affairs
Neville James Bissember	People's National Congress	Minister of Health and Housing
Eugene Francis Correia	People's National Congress	Minister of Communications
Winifred Gaskin	People's National Congress	Minister of Education, Youth, Race Relations & Community Development
C.M. Llewellyn John	People's National Congress	Minister of Agriculture
Robert James Jordan	People's National Congress	Minister of Forests, Lands and Mines
Rudy Kendall	People's National Congress	Minister of Trade and Industry
Deoroop Mahraj	People's National Congress	Minister without Portfolio
Claude Alfonso Merriman	People's National Congress	Minister of Labour and Social Security
David Brandis deGroot	People's National Congress	
William Alexander Blair	People's National Congress	
Jagnarine Budhoo	People's National Congress	
Charles Frederick Chan-A-Sue	People's National Congress	
Oscar Eleazar Clarke	People's National Congress	
Royden George Basil Field-Ridley	People's National Congress	
John Gabriel Joaquin	People's National Congress	
Thomas Anson Sancho	People's National Congress	
Rupert Tello	The United Force	
James Henry Thomas	People's National Congress	
Alex Benjamin Trotman	People's National Congress	
Henry Milton Shakespeare Wharton	People's National Congress	
Aubrey Percival Alleyne	People's National Congress	Elected speaker and replaced by Philip Duncan
Peter d'Aguiar	The United Force	Minister of Finance
Mohamed Kasim	The United Force	Minister of Works and Hydraulics
Randolph Emanuel Cheeks	The United Force	Minister of Local Government
Stephen Campbell	The United Force	Ministry of Home Affairs
Cyril Victor Too Chung	The United Force	
Hari Prashad	The United Force	

== Aftermath ==
Despite the PPP winning a plurality of seats and votes, the PNC and UF collectively had more seats. Despite the two opposition parties declaring their intent to form a coalition, Jagan refused to resign as Premier. Accordingly, Governor Luyt used the Royal prerogative and sacked Jagan as Premier, appointing the PNC's Burnham as the new Premier of British Guiana. This decision led to rioting throughout the colony from the PPP's supporters. A.P. Alleyne was elected as Speaker but the PPP members boycotted the Assembly until 1965. This was the last general election held in the colony as British Guiana was granted independence as Guyana in 1966 with Luyt assuming the role as Governor-General of Guyana representing Queen Elizabeth II as Queen of Guyana. Jagan would eventually be re-elected to power 28 years later when he was elected as President of Guyana.
