= 1980 Guyanese general election =

- 15 December 1980

53 of the 65 seats in the National Assembly 33 seats needed for a majority
- Registered: 493,550
- Turnout: 82.31% (▲2.31pp)
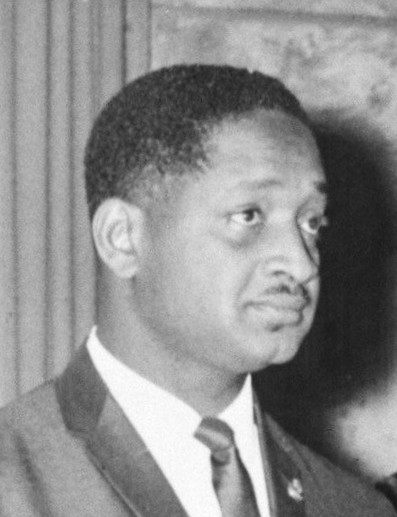

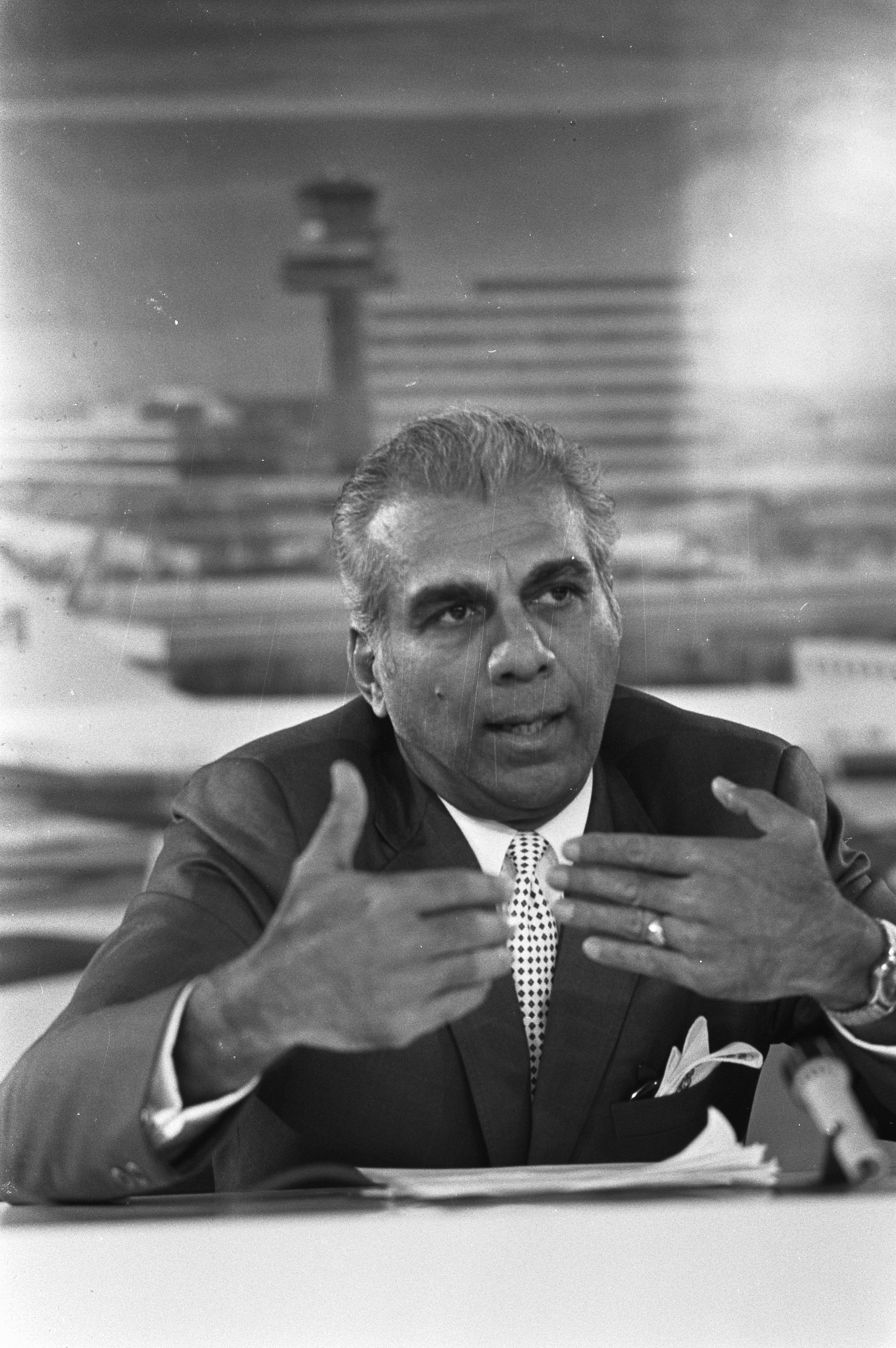

| | First party | Second party | Third party |
|---|---|---|---|
| Leader | Forbes Burnham | Cheddi Jagan | Marcellus Fielden Singh |
| Party | PNC | PPP | TUF |
| Leader since | 13 February 1955 | 1 January 1950 | January 1969 |
| Last election | 70.10%, 37 seats | 26.56%, 14 seats | 2.75%, 2 seats |
| Seats won | 53 | 10 | 2 |
| Seat change | ▲16 | ▼4 | Steady |
| Popular vote | 312,988 | 78,414 | 11,612 |
| Percentage | 77.66% | 19.46% | 2.88% |
| Swing | ▲7.56pp | ▼7.10pp | ▲0.13pp |
- Results by district
President before election
Forbes Burnham
PNC
Elected President
Forbes Burnham
PNC

General elections were held in Guyana on 15 December 1980. The result was a victory for the People's National Congress, which won 41 of the 53 directly-elected seats. However, the PNC's victory was the result of fraud as the government had direct control of the elections. Voter turnout was 82.3%.

== Electoral system ==
The elections followed the adoption of a new constitution which changed the presidency from a ceremonial post to an executive one and enlarged the National Assembly. In addition to the existing 53 members elected by proportional representation in a nationwide constituency, the National Assembly was expanded to include ten members appointed by the regional councils, created under the new constitution and elected on the same date as the national members, and two appointed by the National Congress of Local Democratic Organs, an umbrella body representing the regional councils also created by the new constitution.

The President was elected by a first-past-the-post double simultaneous vote system, whereby each list nominated a presidential candidate and the candidate heading the list that received the most votes was elected president.

== Results ==
| Party | Votes | % | Seats | | | | |
| Party | Votes | % | Elected | Regional appointees | NCLDO appointees | Total | +/– |
|---|---|---|---|---|---|---|---|
| People's National Congress | 312,988 | 77.66 | 41 | 10 | 2 | 53 | +16 |
| People's Progressive Party | 78,414 | 19.46 | 10 | 0 | 0 | 10 | –4 |
| United Force | 11,612 | 2.88 | 2 | 0 | 0 | 2 | 0 |
| Total | 403,014 | 100.00 | 53 | 10 | 2 | 65 | +12 |
| Valid votes | 403,014 | 99.20 | | | | | |
| Invalid/blank votes | 3,251 | 0.80 | | | | | |
| Total votes | 406,265 | 100.00 | | | | | |
| Registered voters/turnout | 493,550 | 82.31 | | | | | |
Source: Nohlen, Chandisingh
