= Peace, Equality and Prosperity Party =

The Peace, Equality and Prosperity Party was a political party in British Guiana led by Kelvin De Freitas.

== History ==
The party contested the 1964 general elections, nominating three candidates, with its campaign was concentrated around Georgetown. They received only 0.5% of the vote and failed to win a seat. The party did not contest any further elections.
