= Clem Seecharan =

Clement Toolsie Shiwcharan, commonly known as Clem Seecharan (born 1950), is an anthropogist and a Caribbean historian. He was born in Guyana and has been based in England since 1986.

== Life and career ==
Seecharan grew up in East Berbice-Corentyne, and attended the Sheet Anchor Anglican School, the Berbice Educational Institute, and Queen's College in Guyana. He studied at McMaster University in Canada, and taught Caribbean Studies at the University of Guyana for some years, before completing his doctorate in Philosophy at the University of Warwick in 1990. He joined the staff of the University of North London (now a part of London Metropolitan University), where he was head of Caribbean studies between 1993 and 2012, and was awarded a professorship in 2002. He is formally retired, having last taught on the Caribbean Studies programme at London Metropolitan University.

Seecharan continues educational and advocacy work informally, as in his recent contribution to a discussion on the legacy of former Guyanese Marxist leader Cheddi Jagan, hosted by the Guyanese High Commission in London on March 28, 2018.

== Publications ==
A distinguished Caribbean historian, Seecharan is the author of publications that include Indo-West Indian Cricket (with Frank Birbalsingh; Hansib, 1988), India and the Shaping of the Indo-Guyanese Imagination: 1890-1920 (Peepal Tree Press, 1993) and Indians in British Guiana 1919-1929 (Macmillan Publishers). In 2005 his biography of Jock Campbell, Sweetening Bitter Sugar: Jock Campbell, the Booker Reformer in British Guiana 1934-1966 was published (Ian Randle Publishers, Jamaica) and won the Elsa Gouveia Prize from the Association of Caribbean Historians, their citation describing it as "an extraordinarily impressive book of signal importance in Caribbean history and historiography." Muscular Learning: Cricket and Education in the Making of the British West Indies at the End of the 19th Century, was published in 2006 (Ian Randle Publishers).

In 2018, Seecharan launched the second volume of the history of cricket in Guyana, covering the years 1898–1914. He wrote a biography of the Guyanese Test cricketer Joe Solomon in 2022, Joe Solomon and the Spirit of Port Mourant.

== Honours ==
Seecharan received an honorary doctorate from the University of the West Indies (UWI) in 2017. He delivered the 2014 Republic of Guyana Distinguished Lecture. In 2023 he was awarded the annual Howard Milton Award for Cricket Scholarship.
