= Peter D'Aguiar =

British Guiana politician (1912–1989)

Peter D'Aguiar in 1969

Peter Stanislaus D'Aguiar (c. 1912 – 30 March 1989) was a Guyanese-Portuguese businessman, conservative politician, and minister of finance from 1964 to 1967.

== Business career ==
In 1934, following the death of his father, D'Aguiar became the managing director of the family business, D'Aguiar Bros. Ltd. The Guyanese business, which was involved in the production of rum and soft drinks, became the first in South America to bottle Pepsi-Cola in 1942. D'aguiar created Banks Breweries Ltd. in 1955, which in contrast to the family business was a public company. However, D'Aguiar Bros. went public in 1966 and merged with Banks Breweries Ltd. in 1969, resulting in D'Aguiar Bros. (D.I.H.) Ltd.

Meanwhile, D'Aguiar formed a brewery in Barbados, Banks (Barbados) Breweries Ltd., which opened its doors in September 1961. This was made possible by the capital injection of over 3000 Barbadians who had purchased over 1.5 million shares in 1959. Not before long, the two businesses in Guyana and Barbados were arguing over the "Banks" brand. After 40 years of battle, they "finally came together" in 2005, bought shares in each other's companies, and agreed to a joint export strategy.

== Political career ==
D'Aguiar unsuccessfully contested the 1953 elections in British Guiana on the slate of the National Democratic Party. D'Aguiar declined to participate in the 1957 elections, but by 1959 he was the leader of the "Defenders of Freedom", an anti-Communist group affiliated with the Catholic Church. That year, D'Aguiar's group began negotiations with Forbes Burnham, the leader of the People's National Congress (PNC). According to the Stabroek News, "D’Aguiar’s ambition was to contest the general elections due to be held in 1961 with his money and the PNC’s masses." The negotiations collapsed in late 1960.

In August 1960, "Defenders of Freedom" came to the attention of United States officials. The Eisenhower administration was increasingly alarmed by the prospect of a domino effect in South America after the radicalisation of Fidel Castro's Cuba, and sought to nip it in the bud in British Guiana. The U.S. soon began providing D'Aguiar's network with anti-Communist material created by the U.S. Information Agency, which was shown on Georgetown street corners without attribution.

On 5 October 1960, D'Aguiar formed a new political party, the United Force (UF). The party compensated for its elitism by soliciting the Amerindian vote, and went on to win 16.38% in the 1961 elections, gaining four seats on the Legislative Assembly, including D'Aguiar himself. The elections were won decisively by Cheddi Jagan's People's Progressive Party (PPP), which won the majority of the seats in the Legislative Assembly, despite only winning a slim plurality of the votes. Nevertheless, the elections demonstrated that a D'Aguiar-Burnham coalition could win if the electoral system was changed to proportional representation. Also in 1961, D'Aguiar bought the Daily Chronicle.

D'Aguiar was prominently involved in the riots which rocked British Guiana in February 1962. A commission of inquiry sent by the British on Jagan's request found that D'Aguiar "seized every opportunity of attacking Dr. Jagan's government and inciting the crowds during the week of disturbances" and "intended to use every means of bringing down the government". The commission also called the Daily Chronicle—D'Aguiar's newspaper—an "unashamed and remorseless protagonist of [the United Force]".

I am opposed to Communism, but I think the worst thing you can do is to
give the Communists a valid excuse for a violent revolution... and these
excuses are being presented on a platter to the Communists in Guyana
— Peter D'Aguiar, The Making of a Prime Minister, January 1969

Thanks in no small part to a plot imposed on the United Kingdom by the United States, new elections were held in 1964, this time with proportional representation. PNC (40.5%) and UF (12.4%) won enough to form a coalition government on 15 December 1964 which oversaw decolonisation in 1966 in which D'Aguiar became finance minister and Burnham prime minister, but they distrusted each other from the beginning. D'Aguiar resigned from the cabinet in September 1967, disgusted by Burnham's corruption. In October 1968, D'Aguiar joined hands with Jagan in walking out of the National Assembly, prompted by Burnham's electoral fraud in preparation for the fake elections of 1968, to be held in December. D'Aguiar appeared with Jagan in a January 1969 documentary by Granada Television, The Making of a Prime Minister, bewailing the fate of Guyana. D'Aguiar then retired from political life.
