= Banks DIH =

Food and beverage manufacturer in Guyana

Banks DIH Ltd.
- Industry: Food and beverages
- Founded: 1969
- Founder: Peter D'Aguiar
- Headquarters: Georgetown, Guyana
- Website: www.banksdih.com

Banks DIH Ltd. is a publicly traded food and beverage manufacturer in Guyana that can trace its origins back to 1840. It is one of the leading local manufacturers.

== History ==
The company originates from a rum business founded in the 1840s by Jose Gomes D'Aguiar, which expanded into a chain of liquor stores. The business grew in 1885 with the addition of a Cocoa and Chocolate Factory and a Schooner Shipping Agency. In 1896 the four sons of the founder formed the D'Aguiar Bros partnership, and bought the Demerara Ice House (DIH). The building, which contained a hotel, soft drink plant and liquor bars, got its name from holding ice imported by schooner from Canada. The company got into difficulty, and in 1934, the year in which Peter D'Aguiar took over DIH from his father, the last of the four sons, the business was on the verge of bankruptcy.

Peter D'Aguiar placed greater emphasis on the core business of manufacturing soft drinks and rum, although the company retained retail outlets, bars and the hotel. The financial position gradually improved. In 1942 the company obtained the first Coca-Cola franchise in South America, and during the 1950s rum production also expanded. In 1955. Peter D'Aguiar promoted the publicly owned Banks Breweries Ltd. In 1966 D'Aguiar Bros. (D.I.H.) was floated as a public company, and it was merged with Banks Breweries in 1969 to form the present Banks DIH Ltd. Banks DIH was the first company to float shares publicly in Guyana. For a long time the capital market was small, only reaching US$10 in 1992. As of October 1993, Banks DIH had just 8,346 shareholders.

Peter D'Aguiar also floated Banks Barbados in the 1960s, but the two companies soon separated, each marketing their own Banks Beer. Both companies saw demand from abroad for their products, but ran into brand ownership problems and other difficulties. In 2005 the two companies decided to market jointly, each buying shares in the other. It was decided to produce the beer in Barbados, including the Banks DIH Shandy range. The first shipment to the United States was made in 2008.

== Current operations ==
The company today produces soft drinks, alcoholic beverages and food products, operates bars and restaurants, and since 1998 has owned a controlling share in Citizens Bank Inc. The company has branches and agents throughout the country and owns a large fleet of delivery vehicles. Products are exported to various Caribbean countries. In collaboration with Banks Holdings Ltd. (BHL Group) of Barbados, Banks Beer is exported to Canada and the United States. The BHL Group owns 20% of Banks DIH Limited and also owns 100% of Banks Barbados Brewery as well as shares of other companies in the Caribbean. Banks DIH also imports and distributes whiskey, vodka and other products from abroad.

In 2011 the Banks DIH Group reported a group pre-tax profit of G$4.046B, a 31% increase over the previous year. The results were announced in January 2012 at the 56th Annual General Meeting, held at the Banks DIH Thirst Park in Georgetown. More than 1,000 shareholders attended the meeting.

== Recent events ==
In October 2010 a boat carrying drinks and other products from the Banks DIH company to the Essequibo Coast developed leaks and had to be grounded on the Stewartville foreshore. Mud had got into the pump, which would not start, and the engine room flooded. After the tide receded, the boat leaned to one side. Some boxes fell off and were taken away by Stewartville residents. That night, dozens of people climbed onto the boat, taking soft drinks and alcoholic drinks, as well as other products such as biscuits and bottled water. The looting was thorough, including draining the fuel from the boat's tanks. Some started drinking while they were looting. One man, apparently drunk, fell into the water and drowned between the boat and the sea wall.

In January 2012 the company announced plans to create a G$21 million Sports Bar in Stabroek Market Square, downtown Georgetown, and to renovate the Demico House building. Banks DIH operates a sports field, and sponsors various sporting events. Banks DIH faces competition from ANSA McAL and Demerara Distillers Ltd, two other large Guyana beverage companies. In June 2012 a domino competition was arranged between the staff of the three companies, hosted at the Banks DIH Sports Club Thirst Park. Banks DIH won the first round.

In the year 2023 Banks DIH went through some major issues leading to the shortage of many products including their main product, Banks beer. Because of this many large wholesalers who have purchases of millions of Guyana dollars in Banks DIH were forced to closed down. This caused many small businesses that depend on the wholesalers to also close down. The company has not made public the cause of this problem but many customers especially large businesses are complaining they will be forced to closed down. The problem is likely to continue till 2025 or until the intervention of the government of Guyana.^{[14] .}

On June 3, the chairman of Banks DIH gave an order stating that the company is not allowed to sell any wholesalers Banks beer nor Guinne however some staff reported that certain wholesalers who give side cash are allowed to purchase both Banks beer and Guinness.
