= Richard Van West-Charles =

Guyanese politician

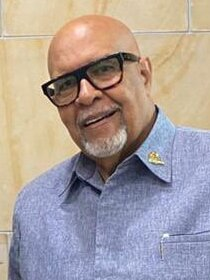
Van West-Charles in 2025

Richard Alexander Van West-Charles (born c. 1949) is a Guyanese politician.

Van West-Charles served as Minister of Health, Water, Housing, and Environment from 1980 to 1985, and as Minister for Medical Education, Food Policy, and Environment from 1985 to 1990. In these appointments, he was an ex officio member of the National Assembly.

Van West-Charles was appointed as Guyana's ambassador to Venezuela in September 2023.

Van West-Charles holds a Doctor of Medicine degree (1979) from the University of Havana and a Master of Public Health degree (1988) from the University of Michigan. His father Maurice Charles was a judge who was appointed to the bench in Ghana and in Canada. His wife Vivienne Roxane is the daughter of Forbes Burnham and Sheila Lataste-Burnham.
