= Stephen Campbell =

Lokono Guyanese politician and political activist (1897–1966)

House of Assembly
- In office 1957–1966

Personal details
- Born: Stephen Joseph Campbell; 26 December 1897 Santa Rosa, British Guiana
- Died: 12 May 1966 (aged 68) Toronto, Canada
- Party: National Labour Front (1957-1961); The United Force (1961-1966)
- Occupation: politician

Stephen Campbell was a Lokono Guyanese politician and political activist, and the first Amerindian member of Parliament in Guyanese history.

== Biography ==
Stephen Joseph Campbell was born to Tiburtio A. Campbell and his wife, Maria dos Santos, in Santa Rosa, British Guiana, on 26 December 1897. Both of Campbell's parents died when he was young, and he was subsequently raised by his grandmother. He was brought up as a devout Catholic. He studied at Santa Rosa Mission School, and subsequently worked for many years as a teacher and as a catechist in various regions of Guyana. Campbell married Umbelina Da Silva on 9 February 1928.

On 10 September 1957, Campbell became the first Amerindian member of Parliament in Guyanese history, when he was elected onto the Legislative Council of British Guiana. He subsequently joined the National Labour Front. In 1961, Campbell changed parties to The United Force. In 1964, he became Permanent Secretary in the Ministry of Home Affairs.

Campbell went to Toronto, Canada for medical treatment, and died there on 12 May 1966, just two weeks before Guyana won independence from Great Britain. He was buried in Canada.

== Legacy ==
Campbell is widely regarded as a hero by Amerindian communities in Guyana, and his achievements are celebrated on 10 September every year as a part of Amerindian Heritage Month. Campbelltown has been named after Stephen Campbell. In 2018, the building of the Ministry of Citizenship was renamed after Campbell.
