= Guiana United Muslim Party =

Political party in Guyana

The Guiana United Muslim Party (GUMP) was a Muslim political party in Guyana.

== History ==
The party was set up in 1964 with assistance from the CIA and the British authorities, and was led by Hoosein Ganie. The American and British governments hoped the new party, together with the Justice Party (which the CIA was also funding), would take votes from the People's Progressive Party (PPP), whose left-wing leanings they were concerned about. Although the CIA estimated that the Justice Party and GUMP could win three seats in the 1964 general elections, neither did; GUMP received only 0.5% of the vote and failed to win a seat, whilst the PPP emerged as the largest party, but was unable to form a government.

In the 1968 elections it received only 0.3% of the vote and again failed to win a seat. The party did not contest any further elections.
