= National Democratic Party (British Guiana) =

Political party in British Guiana

The National Democratic Party (NDP) was a political party in British Guiana led by Rudy Kendall.

== History ==
The NDP was created as a spin-off from the League of Coloured Peoples (LCP). The party contested 15 of the 24 constituencies in the 1953 general elections, and was backed by the media, as well as the LCP, the Manpower Citizens' Association and other trade unions. Its support base was largely among the middle-class Afro-Guyanese population, although it also had some middle-class Indo-Guyanese and Portuguese members, including Lionel Luckhoo. Prior to the elections, two splinter groups left the party to form the People's National Party and the United Guiana Party.

The elections saw the party receive 13% of the vote, winning only two of the 24 seats in the House of Assembly, taken by Kendall (who won in New Amsterdam) and Eugene Francis Correia (Bartica and Interior).

In 1955 the party merged into the new United Democratic Party.
