= The United Force =

Political party in Guyana

- Leader: Marissa Nadir
- Founder: Peter D'Aguiar
- Founded: 1960
- Ideology: Social conservatism Economic liberalism
- Political position: Centre-right
- Colours: Blue, yellow
- Seats: 0 / 65

The United Force (TUF, or UF) is a conservative and economically liberal political party in Guyana. It currently has no representation in the National Assembly and is led by Marissa Nadir.

== History ==
Established on 5 October 1960 by Peter D'Aguiar, and was initially backed by Indian leaders of the Manpower Citizens' Association (MPCA) and some Portuguese businessmen. It drew support from the Portuguese community, but also sought to establish a support based amongst the Amerindian population, convincing Amerindian MP Stephen Campbell to join the party. The party first contested national elections in 1961, when it received 16.4% of the vote, winning four seats, of which two were taken by Amerindians (Campbell and Teddy Melville). However, the following years saw increasing tensions between the MPCA and the ruling People's Progressive Party, together with the Guyana Agricultural and General Workers' Union (GAWU).

Prior to the 1964 British Guiana general election, the Central Intelligence Agency (CIA) would fund and provide propaganda to TUF. A strike by the GAWU in 1964 led to a period of violence known as "The Disturbances" between February and July, including bombings, arson and murder. The violence led to some of the Portuguese community leaving the country, reducing TUF's vote share in the December 1964 elections to 12.4%, although it increased its representation to seven seats, and become the junior partner in a coalition government with the People's National Congress (PNC). However, the coalition broke down in 1968, by which time several TUF prominent members had defected to the PNC.

In the 1968 elections the TUF's share of the vote fell to 7.4% and it was reduced to four seats. The following year, an internal conflict in the party led to the expulsion of several members in the Rupununi district, including Melville. In the aftermath, d'Aguiar resigned as party leader and was replaced by Marcellus Fielden Singh. The party's support based amongst the Amerindian population was further weakened by the PNC government starting an education, integration and land transfer scheme, and by appointing Philip Duncan, an Amerindian, as a government minister.

The party did not contest any elections during the 1970s, but returned in 1980, receiving 2.9% of the vote and winning two seats. It retained the two seats in the 1985 elections, before being reduced to a single seat in 1992. Singh was replaced as leader by Manzoor Nadir in 1993. It retained its single seat in elections in 1997, 2001 and 2006, but lost it in the 2011 elections when its vote share fell to 0.3%. It received the same share of the vote in 2015, again failing to win a seat.

Nadir left TUF to join the PPP, and Valerie Garrido-Lowe became leader of TUF, but upon aligning herself with the AFC, was ejected from the party.

In 2020, TUF announced they would not contest in the 2020 General and Regional Elections.

The current party leader is Marissa Nadir, daughter of former leader Manzoor Nadir.
