= Guyana Agricultural and General Workers' Union =

GAWU
- Guyana Agricultural and General Workers' Union
- Founded: 1946
- Headquarters: Georgetown, Guyana
- Location: Guyana
- Members: 21,000
- Key people: Seepaul Narine, general secretary Komal Chand, president
- Affiliations: WFTU
- Website: gawugy.com

The Guyana Agricultural and General Workers' Union (GAWU) is the largest trade union in Guyana. It was founded in 1946 as the Guiana Industrial Workers' Union. After failing in the 1950s it was reformed as the Guyana Sugar Workers' Union in 1961 but changed its name to Guyana Agricultural Workers' Union in 1962 before becoming the GAWU later that decade. Some functions, in a nutshell, would be first to represent workers' interests with a view to ensuring their rights and benefits are respected; secondly, to engage the employer in collective bargaining to improve wages, benefits and conditions of work; and thirdly, to engage government towards the improvement of the rights of workers generally.

The GAWU is affiliated with the World Federation of Trade Unions.
