= 1953 British Guiana general election =

- 27 April 1953

24 of the 28 seats in the House of Assembly 15 seats needed for a majority
- Turnout: 74.77%
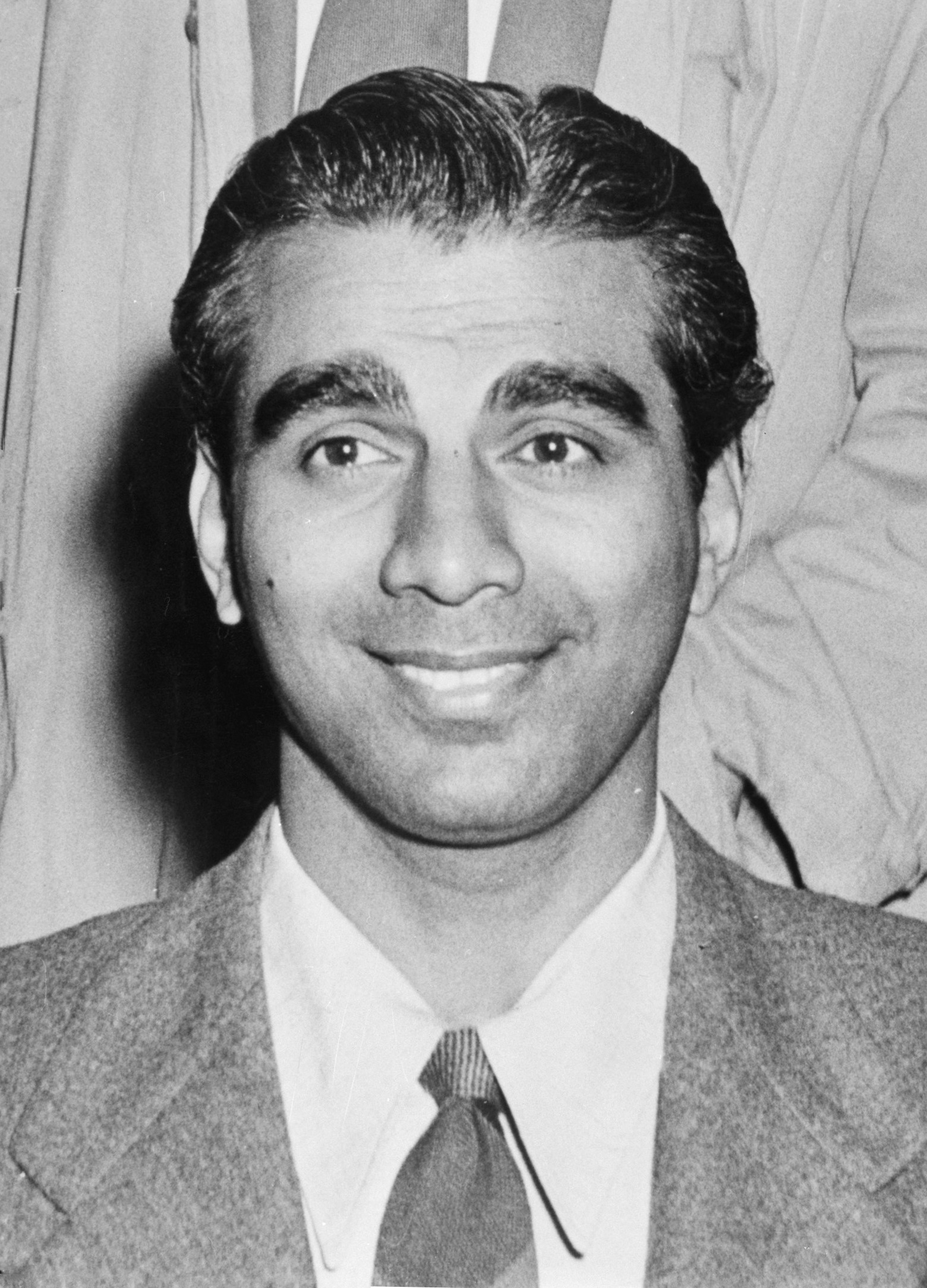

	First party	Second party
Leader	Cheddi Jagan	Rudy Kendall
Party	PPP	NDP
Leader since	1 January 1950	1953
Leader's seat	Corentyne Coast	New Amsterdam
Seats won	18	2
Popular vote	77,695	20,032
Percentage	51.04%	13.16%
Chief Minister before election
None
Elected Chief Minister
Cheddi Jagan
PPP

General elections were held in British Guiana on 27 April 1953. They were the first held under universal suffrage and resulted in a victory for the People's Progressive Party (PPP), which won 18 of the 24 seats in the new House of Assembly. Its leader, Cheddi Jagan, became prime minister.

== Electoral system ==
Constitutional reforms as a result of the Waddington Commission had led to the creation of the House of Assembly to replace the Legislative Council. The new House had 28 members; 24 members elected in single member constituencies, a speaker appointed by the Governor and three ex officio members (the Chief Secretary, the Attorney General and the Financial Secretary).

== Campaign ==
The PPP ran candidates in 22 of the 24 constituencies, failing to contest the two interior constituencies due to a lack of money. The National Democratic Party contested 15 constituencies and the People's National Party eight. A total of 85 independents, including four United Guiana Party candidates, also contested the elections. The United Workers and Farmers Party did run as a party, but contested some seats as independents.

== Results ==
Party	Votes	%	Seats
People's Progressive Party	77,695	51.04	18
National Democratic Party	20,032	13.16	2
People's National Party	3,000	1.97	0
Independents	51,504	33.83	4
Total	152,231	100.00	24
Valid votes	152,231	97.44	
Invalid/blank votes	3,995	2.56	
Total votes	156,226	100.00	
Registered voters/turnout	208,939	74.77	
Source: GECOM

=== Elected members ===
Constituency	Member	Party	Notes
1 – North West	William Alfred Phang	Independent	
2 – Pomeroon	Thomas Sherwood Wheating	Independent	
3 – Western Essequibo	Janet Jagan	People's Progressive Party	Deputy Speaker
4 – Essequibo Islands	Theophilus Lee	Independent	
5 – Bartica and Interior	Eugene Francis Correia	National Democratic Party	
6 – Demerara-Essequibo	Fred Bowman	People's Progressive Party	
7 – West Bank Demerara	Jai Narine Singh	People's Progressive Party	Minister of Local Government and Social Welfare
8 – East Bank Demerara	Joseph Prayag Lachhmansingh	People's Progressive Party	Minister of Health and Housing
9 – Upper Demerara River	Charles Albert Carter	Independent	
10 – Georgetown South	Ashton Chase	People's Progressive Party	Minister of Labour, Industry and Commerce
11 – Georgetown South Central	Clinton Reginald Wong	People's Progressive Party	
12 – Georgetown Central	Jessie Burnham	People's Progressive Party	
13 – Georgetown North	Frank Obermuller van Sertima	People's Progressive Party	
14 – Georgetown North-East	Forbes Burnham	People's Progressive Party	Minister of Education
15 – West Central Demerara	Ram Karran	People's Progressive Party	
16 – Central Demerara	Sydney Evanson King	People's Progressive Party	Minister of Communications and Works
17 – East Central Demerara	Jane Phillips-Gay	People's Progressive Party	
18 – Mahaica-Mahaicony	Chandra Sama Persaud	People's Progressive Party	
19 – Western Berbice	Samuel Mahabali Latchmansingh	People's Progressive Party	
20 – New Amsterdam	Rudy Kendall	National Democratic Party	
21 – Berbice River	Ajodha Singh	People's Progressive Party	
22 – Eastern Berbice	Robert Stanley Hanoman Singh	People's Progressive Party	
23 – Corentyne Coast	Cheddi Jagan	People's Progressive Party	Leader of the House and Minister of Agriculture, Forests, Lands and Mines
24 – Corentyne River	Mohamed Khan	People's Progressive Party	

== Aftermath ==
After assuming power Jagan embarked on implementing a series of policies that involved radical social reform, mainly directed at the colonial oligarchy. The British colonial authorities sent in troops in response to the alleged threat of a Marxist revolution. Governor Alfred Savage suspended the constitution in October (only 133 days after it had come into force) and set up a transitional government of conservative politicians, businessmen and civil servants. Writing in The Guardian in 2020, Gaiutra Bahadur said that "the overthrow of Guyana’s ruling party by colonial forces fomented a racial divide that continues to blight its politics", saying that there was a greater crackdown on the Afro-Guyanese than on the Indo-Guyanese, in a deliberate and successful attempt to divide the PPP.
