= Justice Party (Guyana) =

The Justice Party was an Indo-Guyanese political party in British Guiana.

== History ==
The party was set up in 1964 with assistance from the CIA, and was led by Jai Narine Singh and Balram Singh Rai. Jai Narine Singh asked for $75,000 per month from the United States to fund her political campaign, which was deposited into an account at the Royal Bank of Canada. The American government hoped the new party, together with the Guiana United Muslim Party (which the British government was funding), would take votes from the People's Progressive Party (PPP), whose left-wing leanings they were concerned about. Although the CIA estimated that the Justice Party and GUMP could win three seats in the 1964 general elections, neither did; the Justice Party received only 0.6% of the vote and failed to win a seat, whilst the PPP emerged as the largest party, but was unable to form a government.

The party did not contest any further elections.
