= Elections in Guyana =

Elections in Guyana take place within the framework of a multi-party representative democracy and a parliamentary system. The National Assembly is directly elected, with the nominee of the party or alliance that receives the most votes becoming President.

== Electoral history ==
Elections were first held in what would become Guyana in the 18th century, at a time when the colonies of Berbice, Demerara and Essequibo were under Dutch control. A Court of Policy was established in 1732, which initially consisted of the Governor, five appointed officials (including the Fiscal Officer and the Vendor Master) and five colonists chosen by the Governor from a list of nominees submitted by the College of Kiezers, an electoral college consisting of Dutch planters. Sitting together, the Court of Policy and the College of Kiezers formed the Combined Court.

After the British took control of Guiana in 1803, the College of Kiezers was abolished, and its duties were given to the Financial Representatives, who were elected by the public in six constituencies, although with a severely limited franchise. The Court of Policy and Financial Representatives continued to form the Combined Court. The College of Kiezers was re-established in the 1830s, with its members elected for life by planters. When a vacancy arose in the Court of Policy, the College would nominate two candidates, who the remaining members of the Court of Policy would hold a vote on.

Constitutional reforms in 1891 led to the abolition of the College of Kiezers for a second time and the introduction of direct elections to the Court of Policy, with eight members elected from seven constituencies, in addition to the continued direct election of the six Financial Representatives, giving equal numbers of appointed and elected members in the Combined Court. Elections were held under this system in 1892, 1897, 1901, 1906, 1911, 1916, 1921 and 1926. However, the franchise remained severely limited, with only 11,103 people registered to vote from a population of 317,026 (3.5%) by the time of the 1926 elections; the figure had been just 1.1% for the 1921 elections.

The implementation of a new constitution in 1928 led to the abolition of the existing bodies and the establishment of the 30-seat Legislative Council. The new Council had 14 elected members, elected in single-member constituencies under a limited franchise, but they were now outnumbered by 16 appointees, as the authorities were concerned by the rise of the Popular Party, which had won a majority of the elected seats in 1926. Elections were held under the new system in 1930 and 1935, but World War II caused the next elections to be delayed until 1947, with reforms passed in 1943 reducing the number of appointed members to nine, giving the elected members a majority on the Council. A reduction in the income requirements to voters increased the electorate from 9,514 in 1935 to 59,193.

As a result of the Waddington Commission, further constitutional reforms led to the creation of the House of Assembly to replace the Legislative Council. The new House had 28 members; 24 members elected in single member constituencies, a speaker appointed by the Governor and three ex officio members. Elections were held under the new system in 1953, and were convincingly won by the People's Progressive Party, which took 18 of the 24 seats. However, after assuming power, PPP leader Cheddi Jagan embarked on a series of policies that involved radical social reform, mainly directed at the colonial oligarchy. The British colonial authorities sent in troops in response to the alleged threat of a Marxist revolution and Governor Alfred Savage suspended the constitution in October (only 133 days after it had come into force) and set up a transitional government of conservative politicians, businessmen and civil servants.

The transitional government lasted until elections in 1957 to a reconstituted Legislative Council with 14 elected members. The PPP won all but two seats, although it had split into two factions, one led by Jagan and the other by Forbes Burnham. Another round of constitutional reform in 1961 led to the creation of the Legislature, consisting of an elected 36-member Legislative Assembly (35 members elected in single-member constituencies, who in turn elected a Speaker) and an appointed 13-member Senate. These elections were again won by the PPP, who took 20 of the 35 directly-elected seats. However, the PPP had only received 1.6% more of the vote than the new People's National Congress (PNC), but had won almost double the number of seats. This resulted in mass demonstrations led by the PNC, a general strike and severe inter-racial violence. After a few weeks the British authorities intervened by sending in troops and the Governor declared a state of emergency.

Following these events, further constitutional reforms were enacted to create a unicameral 54-member House of Assembly elected by proportional representation (53 members elected in a single nationwide constituency and a Speaker elected by MPs). The first elections held under the new system took place in 1964, and although the PPP again emerged as the largest party, the PNC was able to form a coalition government with the United Force, which together held 29 seats. Despite losing the elections Jagan refused to resign as Prime Minister, and had to be removed by Governor Richard Luyt, with Burnham replacing him.

After independence in 1966, the House of Assembly was renamed the National Assembly. The electoral system remained unchanged, but the elections were rigged by the PNC, which had transferred responsibility for holding elections from the Electoral Commission to a government department. Unfair elections were held in 1968 and 1973. A new constitution promulgated in 1980 led to the creation of an executive president; the leader of the party that received the most votes in an election would automatically assume the post. Two further fraudulent elections were held in 1980 and 1985, with the PNC winning an increasing number of seats on each occasion.

Due to demands from Western countries and international organisations, democratic reforms were introduced in the late 1980s, and after several postponements, free and fair elections were held in 1992. The result was a victory for the PPP, with Jagan returning to power after a 28-year hiatus. The PPP went on to win the next elections in 1997. In 2001 the electoral system was modified; the single 53-member nationwide constituency was replaced by a 40-member nationwide constituency and 10 multi-member constituencies based on the country's regions, which together elected a further 25 members. Elections later that year saw another PPP victory, which the party repeated in 2006

The 2011 elections saw the PPP won the largest number of seats (32), but fail to achieve a majority; however, although opposition parties held a majority of seats, the rule that the head of the largest party becomes President allowed new PPP leader Donald Ramotar to assume the position. Prior to the 2015 elections all parliamentary opposition parties (the Alliance for Change and the four-member APNU, which included the PNC) formed a single electoral list. The elections saw the joint list win 33 seats, allowing PNC leader David A. Granger to become president.

== Electoral system ==
The 65 elected members of the National Assembly are elected for a five-year term using closed list proportional representation from a single nationwide 40-seat constituency and 10 sub-national multi-member constituencies with a total of 25 seats. Seats are allocated using the Hare quota. The Guyana Elections Commission is responsible for the administration and conduct of elections.

== Referendums ==
Only one referendum has been held at the national level in Guyana. It was held in 1978 on the proposed change to Article 73 of the constitution, which would abolish the need for referendums to change the entrenched provisions of the constitution (including presidential powers, the dissolution of Parliament and the electoral system) and instead allow them to be changed by a two-thirds majority in parliament (which the ruling People's National Congress had at the time). The changes were reportedly approved by 97% of voters with a turnout of 70%, although the figures were subject to fraud by the government.
