= Constitution of Guyana =

Constitution of 1980

The Constitution of Guyana is the highest governing document in the Republic of Guyana. It came into effect on October 6, 1980, replacing the constitution enacted in 1966 upon its independence from the United Kingdom. The current Constitution of Guyana contains 12 chapters that are further divided into 232 articles. It also contains a preamble and an oath. Since its 1980 enactment, it has gone through multiple amendments.

== Pre-independence constitutions ==
Guyana's complex constitutional history provides a useful means of understanding the conflict between local interests and those of Britain, the long-time colonial power. The colony's first governing document, the Concept Plan of Redress, was promulgated under Dutch rule in 1792 and remained in effect with modifications under British administration until 1928. Although revised considerably over the years, the Concept Plan of Redress provided for a governor appointed by the colonial power and for a Court of Policy that evolved into the colony's legislature. Reforms throughout the 19th century gradually broadened the electoral franchise and lessened the power of the planters in the colonial government.

As a result of financial difficulties in the 1920s, as well as conflict between the established sugar planters and new rice and bauxite producers, the British government promulgated a new constitution making British Guiana a crown colony. The Court of Policy was replaced by a Legislative Council with thirty members (sixteen appointed and fourteen elected), and executive power was placed in the hands of a governor appointed by officials in London. Modifications throughout the 1930s and 1940s made the majority of members of the Legislative Council subject to popular election and further broadened the franchise.

The formation of British Guiana's first major political party in 1950 and growing pressure for independence again forced the British to overhaul the political framework. A royal commission proposed a new constitution that would provide for a bicameral legislature consisting of a lower House of Assembly and an upper State Council, a governor appointed by the British, and seven ministers appointed by the House of Assembly. This constitution was put into effect in early 1953. The success of self-proclaimed Marxist-Leninist Cheddi Jagan and his leftist People's Progressive Party (PPP) in the April 1953 elections frightened the colonial authorities. After the new legislature passed a controversial labour bill and pressed for independence, the British suspended the constitution in October 1953 and put in place an interim government whose members were chosen entirely by British authorities.

New elections were held in 1957 to choose a majority of members in the new Legislative Council; the rest of the members were chosen by the governor. During its four-year tenure, this government set up a committee to make recommendations on yet another constitution. The committee proposed that a new government be formed with full internal autonomy. Only defence and external affairs would be managed by the British.

In 1961 the new constitution went into effect. A bicameral Legislature was established with a thirty-five-member Legislative Assembly, consisted entirely of elected officials; and the upper house, the thirteen-member Senate, consisted entirely of appointees. The prime minister, who was chosen by the party with a majority of votes in the Legislative Assembly, held the most powerful executive post. Assisting the prime minister were various other ministers. The governor remained the titular head of state. The PPP won the elections of August 1961, and Jagan was named prime minister.

Labour strife and civil disturbances were widespread in 1962 and 1963. In an effort to quell the unrest, the British colonial secretary declared a state of emergency and proposed modifying the constitution to provide for a unicameral fifty-three-member House of Assembly and proportional representation. The proposal was adopted, and elections were set for 1964. The elections brought to power a new coalition government headed by the PNC. However, the PPP administration refused to step down. Not until a constitutional amendment was enacted empowering the governor to dismiss the House of Assembly was the old government removed from power.

== Independence constitution ==
Independent Guyana's first constitution, a modified version of the 1961 constitution, took effect on the first day of independence, May 26, 1966. It reaffirmed the principle that Guyana was a democratic state founded on the rule of law. The titular head of the country was the British monarch, represented in Guyana by the governor general, who served in a largely ceremonial capacity. Real executive power rested in the prime minister, appointed by the majority party in the renamed National Assembly, and his ministers. The first post-independence elections in 1968 confirmed the dominant role of the PNC and its leader, Forbes Burnham.

On February 23, 1970, the Burnham government proclaimed the Cooperative Republic of Guyana. This move had both economic and political ramifications. The government argued that the country's many resources had been controlled by foreign capitalists and that organizing the population into cooperatives would provide the best path to development.

The 1970 proclamation severed Guyana's last significant constitutional tie to Britain. The governor general, heretofore the ceremonial head of state, was replaced by a president, also a ceremonial figure. Arthur Chung, a Chinese-Guyanese, was the country's first president.

Although its ties to the British monarch were broken, Guyana remained within the Commonwealth of Nations. Membership in the Commonwealth allowed Guyana to reap the benefits of access to markets in Britain and to retain some of the defence arrangements that Britain offered its former colonies. In particular, the British defence umbrella was seen as a deterrent to Venezuelan claims on Guyanese territory.

In 1978 a constitutional referendum was held. The proposed change to Article 73 of the constitution would abolish the need for referendums to change the entrenched provisions of the constitution (including presidential powers, the dissolution of Parliament and the electoral system) and instead allow them to be changed by a two-thirds majority in parliament (which the PNC had at the time). It would also result in the postponement of the elections scheduled for later in the year, and instead the parliament elected in 1973 would be declared a Constituent Assembly. The bill was passed by the National Assembly on 10 April, with the referendum held three months later. The changes were reportedly approved by 97% of voters with a turnout of 70%, although the figures were subject to fraud by the government. The opposition claimed that turnout was only between 10% and 14%.

== Constitution of 1980 ==
As Burnham consolidated his control over Guyanese politics throughout the 1970s, he began to push for changes in the constitution that would muffle opposition. He and his colleagues argued that the changes were necessary to govern in the best interest of the people, free of opposition interference. By the late 1970s, the government and the legislature were PNC-dominated, and the party had declared its hegemony over the civil service, the military, the judiciary, the economic sector, and all other segments of Guyanese society. Burnham called the 1966 constitution inadequate and the product of British conservatism. Nationalization of private enterprise was to be the first step in revamping a system that Burnham felt had been designed to protect private property at the expense of the masses.

Two of the principal architects of the new constitution were the minister of justice and attorney general, Mohammed Shahabbuddeen, and Hugh Desmond Hoyte, the minister of economic planning. Attorney General Shahabbuddeen was given the task of selling the new constitution to the National Assembly and the people. He decried the 1966 constitution as a capitalist document that supported a national economy based on exports and the laws of supply and demand. He argued that the constitution safeguarded the acquisitions of the rich and privileged and did not significantly advance the role of the people in the political process.

The constitution of 1980, promulgated in October of that year, reaffirmed Guyana's status as a cooperative republic within the Commonwealth. It defines a cooperative republic as having the following attributes: political and economic independence, state ownership of the means of production, a citizenry organized into groups such as cooperatives and trade unions, and an economy run on the basis of national economic planning. The constitution states that the country is a democratic and secular state in transition from capitalism to socialism and that the constitution is the highest law in the country, with precedence over all other laws. The constitution guarantees freedom of religion, speech, association, and movement, and prohibits discrimination. It also grants every Guyanese citizen the right to work, to obtain a free education and free medical care, and to own personal property; it also guarantees equal pay for women. However, freedom of expression and other political rights are limited by national interests and the state's duty to ensure fairness in the dissemination of information to the public.

Power is distributed among three "Supreme Organs of Democratic Power": the executive president, the cabinet, and the National Assembly. Of these three divisions of government, the executive president in practice has almost unlimited powers.

The original Constitution provided for two additional Supreme Organs of Democratic Power: The National Congress of Local Democratic Organs and the Supreme Congress of the People (a special deliberative body consisting of the National Assembly in joint session with the National Congress of Local Democratic Organs).

The important constitutional changes brought about by the 1980 document were mostly political: the concentration of power in the position of executive president and the creation of local party organizations to ensure Burnham's control over the PNC and, in turn, the party's control over the people. The constitution's economic goals were more posture than substance. The call for nationalization of major industries with just compensation was a moot point, given that 80 percent of the economy was already in the government's hands by 1976. The remaining 20 percent was owned by Guyanese entrepreneurs.
