= Popular Party (British Guiana) =

Political party in British Guiana

The Popular Party was a political party in British Guiana.

== History ==
The party was established in 1926 by a group of middle class liberals, and was led by Nelson Cannon and A. R. F. Webber. The party's General Council was largely black middle class professionals, and attracted support from the trade unions led by Hubert Nathaniel Critchlow. Running on a platform of economic development and campaigning against British colonial policies, the party received most of the black vote in the general elections later that year, winning twelve of the 14 elected seats.

A a result of the party's success in the elections, the British authorities made constitutional changes in 1928, replacing the Combined Court with the Legislative Council. The new Council had a majority of appointed members, giving the conservative white population a majority over the Popular Party, who opposed the reforms.

As a result of disquiet about the reforms, it was suggested that the Popular Party candidates should be unopposed at the 1930 elections. Ultimately eight of their candidates were returned unopposed, and despite a few serious challenges, only one seat changed hands. The party also won seats in the 1935 elections.
