= Henry William Bentinck =

Dutch-born British colonial administrator (1765–1820)

Governor of Saint Vincent
- In office 1802–1806
- Monarch: George III
- Preceded by: Drewry Ottley
- Succeeded by: Robert Paul

Governor of Demerara and Essequibo
- In office 10 May 1806 – April 1812

Governor of Berbice
- In office 8 January 1814 – 10 November 1820

Personal details
- Born: Hendrik Willem Bentinck; November 15, 1765 The Hague, Dutch Republic
- Died: November 10, 1820 (aged 54) Georgetown, British Guiana
- Citizenship: British
- Occupation: Colonial administrator
- Known for: Governor of Saint Vincent, Essequibo Demerara, and Berbice

Henry William Bentinck (born Hendrik Willem Bentinck; 15 November 1765 – 10 November 1820) was a Dutch-born British colonial administrator who served as the governor of Saint Vincent (1802–1806), Essequibo Demerara (1806–1812), and Berbice (1814–1820).

== Biography ==
Bentinck was born in The Hague, Dutch Republic on 15 November 1765 as Hendrik Willem Bentinck. He was a grandson of Willem Bentinck van Rhoon, and a relative of William Cavendish-Bentinck, 3rd Duke of Portland. Bentinck was educated in Great-Britain. He served 12 years as a cavalry officer in the Dutch States Army. On 18 January 1795, William V fled from the Netherlands, and went into exile in Great-Britain. In the same year, Bentinck left for Great-Britain, and started to work for the British colonial service.

In 1802, he was appointed Governor of Saint Vincent and served until 1806. After returning from England, he was appointed Governor of Demerara and Essequibo on 10 May 1806. The British government issued a rule overturning the Demerara Court of Policy's decision to proscribe slaves from holding meetings at night. Bentinck delayed implementing the rule, and was dismissed as a result. In April 1812, he returned to England and was succeeded by Hugh Lyle Carmichael. On 8 January 1814, Bentinck served as Governor of Berbice. In Berbice, he was also owner of plantation "La Bonne Intention". He was involved in cotton, but ran into financial difficulties.

On 10 November 1820, Bentinck died in Georgetown, at the age of 54.

Government offices
Preceded by William Bentinck	Governor of Saint Vincent; 1802–1806	Succeeded by Robert Paul (1st time)(acting)
Preceded by James Montgomery (acting)	Lieutenant governor of Demerara and Essequibo; 1806–1812	Succeeded by Hugh Lyle Carmichael
Preceded by Grant (acting)	Lieutenant Governor of Berbice; 1814–1820	Succeeded by Major Alexander Thistlethwayte (acting)
