= Alfred Thorne =

Alfred Thorne may refer to:

- Alfred P. Thorne (1913–2012), development economist, consultant and educator
- Alfred A. Thorne (1871–1956), author and human rights activist in British Guiana
