= 1930 British Guiana general election =

General elections were held in British Guiana in September 1930.

== Electoral system ==
Following the victory of the Popular Party in the 1926 elections, constitutional reforms in 1928 replaced the 22-member Combined Court with a new 30-member Legislative Council, which included an extra eight appointees, giving them a majority of seats over the elected members. The new Legislative Council consisted of the Governor, two ex-officio members, eight official members, five unofficial members and 14 members elected in single-member constituencies.

== Results ==
Popular Party candidates were elected unopposed in eight constituencies as a result of disquiet over the 1928 constitutional reforms.

Constituency	Elected member
Berbice River	Joseph Eleazar
Central Demerara	John Ignatius De Aguiar
Demerara-Essequibo	Jung Bahadur Singh
Demerara River	Alfred Victor Crane
Eastern Berbice	Edward Alfred Luckhoo
Eastern Demerara	Arnold Emanuel Seeram
Essequibo River	Edmund Fitzgerald Fredericks
Georgetown Central	Percy Claude Wight
Georgetown North	Nelson Cannon
Georgetown South	Joseph Gonsalves
New Amsterdam	Eustace Gordon Woolford
North Western District	Victorine Antonio Pires
Western Berbice	Albert Raymond Forbes Webber
Western Essequibo	Robert Edward Brassington
Source: Parliament of Guyana

== Aftermath ==
The first meeting of the newly elected Council was held on 16 October.
