= 1897 British Guiana general election =

General elections were held in British Guiana in 1897.

== Electoral system ==
The elections were held under the 1891 constitution, which provided for a 16-member Court of Policy, half of which was elected. The Court included the Governor, seven government officials (the Attorney General, the Government Secretary, the Immigration Agent General and the Receiver General, together with three other appointees). The eight elected members were elected from seven constituencies; Demerara East, Demerara West, Essequebo North Western, Essequebo South Eastern, Berbice, City of Georgetown (2 members) and New Amsterdam.

In addition, six "Financial Representatives" were also elected in six single member constituencies; Demerara, Essequebo North Western, Essequebo South Eastern, Berbice, Georgetown and New Amsterdam. Together with the Court of Policy, the two groups formed the Combined Court.

The franchise was restricted on the basis of a minimum income level, and women could not vote. The 1897 elections saw the introduction of the secret ballot.

== Campaign ==
The elections saw a strong campaign to get non-white representation in the Court of Policy. The Progressive Association supported several candidates, including Andrew Benjamin Brown after he was attacked by the white-owned The Echo newspaper. Brown and Patrick Dargan were both supported by Alfred A. Thorne.

== Results ==
Almost all the candidates supported by the Progressive Association were elected, including Dargan and Brown.
