= Robert Victor Evan Wong =

British Guyanese politician (1895–1952)

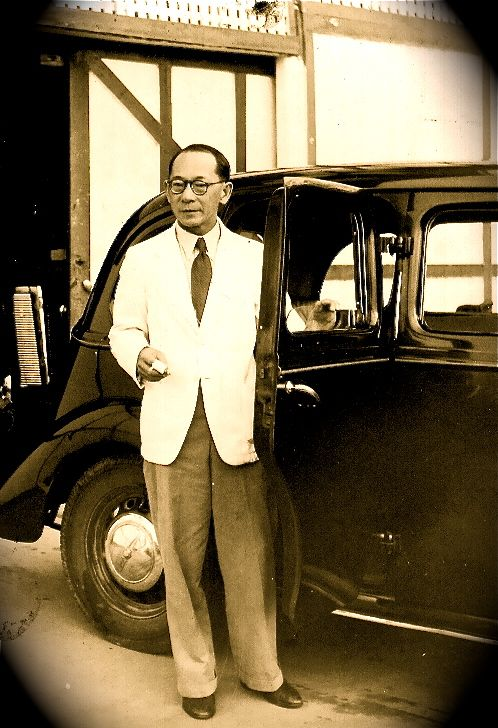

British Guiana Court of Policy
- In office 1926–1934
- Constituency: Essequibo Islands

Personal details
- Born: Robert Victor Evan Wong; 4 July 1895 Georgetown, British Guiana
- Died: 19 October 1952 (aged 57) Georgetown, British Guiana
- Spouse: Cheu-Leen Ho-A-Shoo
- Children: 5
- Education: University of Bristol
- Occupation: Politician; Civil engineer Rancher; Businessman

Robert Victor Evan Wong (4 July 1895 – 19 October 1952) was a Guyanese politician, civil engineer, rancher and businessman, elected to the British Guiana legislature in 1926 and 1934, and appointed to its Executive Council in 1928. He is notable for being the first Chinese-Guianese member of both the British Guiana Legislative and Executive Councils.

== Early life ==
Wong was born in Georgetown, British Guiana, the eldest son of a wealthy Chinese merchant. He studied engineering and economics at the University of Bristol, receiving a B.Sc. degree in 1917 in England.

== Career ==
=== Business ===
Prevented by poor eyesight from serving in World War I, Wong returned to the Colony to serve as a civil engineer in government service, designing sea walls, bridges, roads, sluices and other infrastructure. He thereafter managed a family sugar plantation and refinery.

=== Politics ===
In 1926, at age 31, Wong won election to the British Guiana Court of Policy from the Essequibo Islands. This body became the Legislative Council following a Constitutional change in 1928. As a result, Wong has been identified as the first person of East Asian descent elected to a national legislature in the Americas. His subsequent appointment to the Executive Council was also a first for a West Indian Chinese. As a legislator, Wong was a principal proponent of the introduction of personal income taxation. Wong won election to a subsequent term on the Legislative Council in 1934 under a slogan reflecting his initials: Right Vanquishes Every Wrong.

Wong's business interests included Good Hope Ranch in the Rupununi Savannah, Anchor Ranch in Berbice, and interests in an abattoir, tannery and shoemaking factory. He owned a number of stone quarries, as well as oil and bauxite mining concessions. Wong promoted a government and internationally financed sustainable development project for tropical hardwood industry, cut short by World War II. Wong was co-founder and President of the Durban Race Club.

Corruption charges leveled at Wong's 1934 election campaign led to a new election, which Wong won narrowly, for his final term in office.

Wong was charged in the press with holding a monopoly in the stone quarry business. His stone quarry on the Essequibo was expropriated by the Allies during World War II under the Destroyers for Bases Agreement, and supplied stone for air defenses throughout the Caribbean. Wong died on 19 October 1952.

== In popular culture ==
Good Hope Ranch, referred to as Wong's Ranch, is featured in Evelyn Waugh's travel memoir Ninety-Two Days. Wong was a hero to Waugh's guide Yetto, on account of his reputation for high play at cards.

== Personal life ==
Wong married Cheu-Leen Ho-A-Shoo, daughter of another notable Chinese family in the Colony, in Barbados, shortly after they completed their University studies in England. He was survived by Cheu-Leen, four daughters and one son, Evan Wong, named for the family patriarch.
