= Alfred Savage =

British politician (1903–1980)

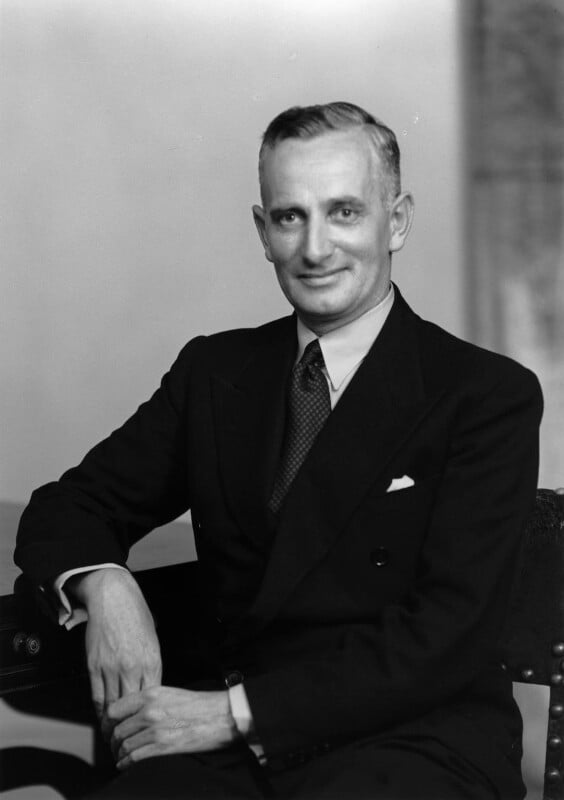
Savage in 1949

Sir Alfred William Lungley Savage (5 May 1903 – 5 March 1980) was the Governor of Barbados in 1949–51, and the colonial Governor of British Guiana in 1953–55.

On 9 October, 1953, upon instruction from Winston Churchill to stop what the Colonial Office called a brewing "Communist conspiracy", Savage dismissed the democratically elected government of Cheddi Jagan, suspended the constitution, and took full control of the colony, with the help of British troops. This took place just months after Jagan took office in 1953.

Savage was not particularly worried either before or after the intervention about communist influence in British Guiana. Savage was replaced by Sir Patrick Muir Renison in 1955, after Alan Lennox-Boyd had become uneasy about Savage and wanted a more forceful hand in Georgetown.

Government offices
Preceded by Sir Hilary Rudolph Robert Blood	Governor of Barbados; 1949–1953	Succeeded by Brigadier Sir Robert Arundell
Preceded by Sir Charles Campbell Woolley	Governor of British Guiana; 1953–1955	Succeeded by Sir Patrick Muir Renison
