= Legislative assembly =

Legislature, or one of its houses

Legislative assembly is the name given in some countries to either a legislature, or to one of its houses.

The name is used by a number of countries, including member-states of the Commonwealth of Nations and other countries. It is also used by their sub-national divisions, such as the Indian states and union territories, Australian states and Canadian provinces.

== Legislative assemblies in the Commonwealth ==
Legislative assemblies in modern-day Commonwealth countries, either as national or sub-national parliaments, are in most cases an evolution of one of the legislative chambers of the previous colonial parliaments, whether the full legislature or a lower house. In a number of jurisdictions, the name House of Assembly is used instead. It is one of the main names used in everyday speech for parliament in many countries.

=== Australia ===
Three of the six Australian states style their lower houses as Legislative Assemblies; in South Australia and Tasmania, they are styled as Houses of Assembly. The unicameral parliaments of Queensland and the two self-governing territories also style their legislature as Legislative Assemblies. Queensland originally had a Legislative Council as its upper house, in line with the other states, until it was abolished leaving it the only state with a sole chamber of parliament.

The previously self-governing Norfolk Island had its own Legislative Assembly until it was abolished and replaced with a Regional Council in 2015.

Members of these assemblies are referred to as MLAs (WA, ACT, NT) and MPs (NSW, QLD, VIC, SA, TAS). Previously, MLA and MHA have been used in states that now use MP.

=== Canada ===
In Canada, seven of the ten provinces and all three of the territories style their legislatures as legislative assemblies. All are unicameral. Manitoba was the first to abolish its Legislative Council in 1876. British Columbia and Newfoundland and Labrador abolished their Councils before becoming provinces. There was no Council for Alberta when it was created in 1905. The Legislative Assembly of Quebec was renamed the Quebec National Assembly as part of the abolition of the Legislative Council of Quebec on December 31, 1968.

=== India ===
In India, the lower house or the only house of the State Legislatures are called Legislative Assemblies. The same name is also used for the only house of the legislatures of three of the eight union territories, Delhi, Jammu and Kashmir and Puducherry. The upper house in states with a bicameral legislature are called Legislative Councils. Members of the former are called MLAs, and those of the latter are called MLCs.

=== Other Commonwealth countries and British Overseas Territories ===
- State legislative assemblies of Malaysia
- Legislative Assembly of Samoa
- Legislative Assembly of Tonga
- Legislative Assembly of the Falkland Islands

=== Former legislative assemblies ===
- In Mauritius, the unicameral parliament was known as the legislative assembly until 1992, when, following the establishment of a republic, it was renamed the National Assembly
- Legislative Assembly of Lower Canada (1791–1838)
- Legislative Assembly of Upper Canada (1791–1841)
- Legislative Assembly (British Guiana) (1961–1964)
- Central Legislative Assembly of British India–1947

== Legislative assemblies outside the Commonwealth ==
Legislative Assembly is the name given to some national legislatures (or one of the houses of the national legislature) of the sovereign nations of:

- Plurinational Legislative Assembly of Bolivia
- Legislative Assembly of Costa Rica
- Legislative Assembly of El Salvador

Former assemblies include:

- National Legislative Assembly of Thailand (2014)
- National Legislative Assembly (South Sudan)
- Legislative Assembly of Kyrgyzstan
- Legislative Assembly of Revolutionary France

Legislative bodies of the United States include:

- North Dakota Legislative Assembly
- Oregon Legislative Assembly
- Legislative Assembly of Puerto Rico

The legislatures of the States of Brazil are called "legislative assembly", as are the legislatures of the two insular autonomous regions of Portugal, Azores (the Legislative Assembly of the Azores) and Madeira (the Legislative Assembly of Madeira), and the regional councils of three Italian regions (Emilia-Romagna, Marche and Umbria). In Mexico, the legislative branch of government of Mexico City is the Legislative Assembly of Mexico City.

The Legislative Assembly of Macau is the organ of the legislative branch of the Macau Special Administrative Region.

== See also ==
- Council
- Legislative council
- House of Assembly
- National Assembly
- Landtag
- Member of the Legislative Assembly
