= 1892 British Guiana general election =

General elections were held in British Guiana in 1892.

== Electoral system ==
The elections were held under the 1891 constitution, which provided for a 16-member Court of Policy, half of which was elected. The Court included the Governor, seven government officials (the Attorney General, the Government Secretary, the Immigration Agent General and the Receiver General, together with three other appointees). The eight elected members were elected from seven constituencies; Demerara East, Demerara West, Essequebo North Western, Essequebo South Eastern, Berbice, City of Georgetown (2 members) and New Amsterdam.

In addition, six "Financial Representatives" were also elected in six single member constituencies; Demerara, Essequebo North Western, Essequebo South Eastern, Berbice, Georgetown and New Amsterdam. Together with the Court of Policy, the two groups formed the Combined Court.

The franchise was restricted on the basis of a minimum income level, and women could not vote.

== Campaign ==
Partick Dargan, a coloured lawyer, ran a vibrant campaign, calling for free and liberal universal education and for civil service entrance to be based on competitive exams. Two black lawyers, J A Murdock and W E Lewis also contested the elections. Only three seats were contested.

== Results ==
No black candidates won a seat, whilst only two coloureds were elected; Dargan, Murdock and Lewis all failed to win seats. The 14 elected members included seven planters, five merchants and two barristers.

| Constituency | Elected member |
Court of Policy
| Demerara East | E.C. Luard |
| Demerara West | A. Barr |
| Essequebo North Western | A.R. Gilzean |
| Essequebo South Eastern | William Craigen |
| Berbice | Andrew Hunter |
| City of Georgetown | D.M. Hutson |
| City of Georgetown | A. Weber |
| New Amsterdam | B.H. Stephens |
Financial Representatives
| Demerara | G. Garnett |
| Essequebo North Western | R.G. Duncan |
| Essequebo South Eastern | H. McN. Greene |
| Berbice | William Ingall |
| Georgetown | J. Duke Smith |
| New Amsterdam | N.R. McKinnon |
Source: Clementi
