= Alfred A. Thorne =

Guyanan educator and campaigner (1871–1956)

A. A. Thorne
- Born: 14 August 1871 Barbados, British West Indies
- Died: 23 April 1956 (aged 84) Georgetown, British Guiana
- Resting place: Le Repentir Cemetery, Georgetown
- Occupation: Educator, trade unionist and politician
- Education: Durham University (BA (Hons), MA); Wilberforce University (honorary LL.D)
- Spouse: Eleanor McLean; Violet Ashurst
- Children: 10 (7 sons and 3 daughters)

Alfred Athiel Thorne, generally known as A. A. Thorne (14 August 1871 – 23 April 1956), was an educator, politician, writer, pioneering trade unionist, and human rights advocate in British Guiana (now Guyana). He has been described as a titanic figure in the political and social history of colonial Guyana.

In 1894, Thorne founded and led the Middle School, an innovative co-educational private grammar school that provided students with a path to education, regardless of race or background. He served in multiple elected and appointed roles, over a 50-year period, at both national and municipal levels, including as deputy mayor of British Guiana's capital city, Georgetown. He was elected for two separate terms on British Guiana's legislative body, the Combined Court. Thorne advocated for improved workplace safety, racial equality, democracy, and self-determination. He sought to unify the disparate working class communities that made up British Guiana. He was a lifelong journalist, columnist and newspaper letter writer.

== Early life and education ==
A. A. Thorne was born on 14 August 1871 in Barbados, then a British West Indies colony, to Louisa Jane Alleyne and Samuel Athiel Thorne, a schoolmaster in Barbados. A. A. Thorne completed his early education at the Lodge School, then graduated from Codrington College in St. John, Barbados. Between 1875 and 1965, Codrington College was affiliated to Durham University, England, with the Barbados college maintaining a classical studies faculty until 1955, to feed into classics and theology degrees awarded by Durham. Thorne subsequently earned both his Bachelor's and Masters degrees at Durham University in England after his school examination results were recognized with the award of an academic scholarship. He is believed to be the first person of African descent to have earned both degrees, as conferred by a British university.

In 1890, while still a teenager, Thorne challenged the Barbados Board of Education regarding the award of the Barbados Scholarship. This would have financially assisted Thorne at Durham, as well as an academic recognition that was described as highly prestigious. Thorne felt that he should have been awarded the scholarship, based on his examination results, but the Board awarded it to someone else, and sources imply this was a white student. Though Thorne lost a legal battle on this point, but the resultant outcry led to a change in the way the Barbados Scholarship was awarded. Thereafter the awarded scholarship was selected and named by Cambridge University's examiners, and solely on merit.

== Advocate for educational access ==
After graduation from Durham, A. A. Thorne moved to British Guiana, where in September 1894 he founded British Guiana's first co-educational private grammar school, that provided equal access to qualified students, regardless of background. The school provided girls and boys from middle and working-class families in the British colony the opportunity to gain access to the same level of education that had previously been reserved only for descendants of the 'plantocracy' - former slave-owning families - and the colonial elites. Over time the performance of Thorne's Middle School students, in national tests, was similar to that achieved by the private British-run schools, such as the Queen's College (a boys only school) and Bishops' High School, which was a girls only school.

A. A. Thorne oversaw the development of this school as headmaster for many years, recruiting teachers from across the country. Thorne established a needs-based financial aid system for all students, which he financed, enrolling both boys and girls from underprivileged working class and moderate income families with access to tuition at reduced cost. Fees per term were G$5 to G$12, compared to G$17 at Queen's. He created educational access to girls and minorities, many decades before gender and other civil rights were protected by anti-discrimination laws.

Thorne's Middle School became renowned for the education it provided its students. As a result, the school began attracting student applications from high income families, successfully competing with Queen's College for some of the most talented students in the country. Ultimately, the trustees of Queen's College and Bishop's High School, under pressure from government oversight, sought to learn from and merge their institutions with Thorne's Middle School, in exchange for the commitment from Queen's College and Bishop's High School to revise their admissions policies. This allowed all academically qualified applicants from lower income groups, previously excluded from admission, to have access to these elite schools, regardless of their background. Subsequent generations of students across Guyana from working-class families and minority backgrounds have since attended Queen's College.

Thorne was instrumental in raising education standards and academic performance results across British Guiana by uplifting scholarship examination requirements from locally-derived standards to those used elsewhere in the British Empire. Among other things, he introduced the College of Preceptors examinations to British Guiana, establishing new standards and qualifications for secondary school teachers.

== Journalism and writing ==
Thorne worked as a journalist for much of his adult life. He was a columnist who wrote for the African-Guianese owned newspaper Echo under the pen names Junius Junior and Demos. He was also briefly lead writer there in the late 19th century. Improving the standard of education in British Guiana was a frequent topic of his journalism, particularly before he had the platform of elected office in 1906. In 1911 and 1912 he published On Industrial Training in B.G.. Thorne wrote articles for Timehri, the journal of the Royal Agricultural and Commercial Society of British Guiana, where Thorne was on the Education sub-committee. In these, in 1910, he referenced efforts to establish model school gardens, then agricultural apprentices and later an agricultural school or college. These efforts were not taken through by the colonial government, possibly hindered by the outbreak of the First World War. He was also a prodigious letter writer to the major colonial newspapers.

Thorne's perspectives were included in Nancy Cunard's Negro: An Anthology in a five-page essay titled 'The Negro and his Descendants in British Guiana'. In this highly influential and magnificently produced book, Thorne describes the social and economic conditions of black and brown people living in the plantation-based colonies of Guiana under Dutch, French, and British rule, the effects of divide and rule policies, and puts the argument for black unity. Some stereotypes used by Thorne in this essay have been challenged by more recent academics.

== Political service and positions ==
A. A. Thorne was in public service for five decades, holding numerous elected an appointed offices at municipal and national levels continuously for 50 years from 1902 to 1952. Nationally, Thorne was elected to the Combined Court, British Guiana's legislative body from 1906 to 1911 as the Financial Representative for the County of Essequebo - North Western division. He was re-elected to the Court for a second term from 1916 to 1921 for New Amsterdam, again as the Financial Representative. He was elected as City Councillor for Georgetown City Council for 47 continuous years starting in 1902. He was elected as the city's Deputy Mayor in 1921, 1922 and 1925.

While serving in government, Thorne argued for opening avenues of employment to Guianese, including the Civil Service. He worked to get the Anglican church disestablished as the national religious body for the colony. This was particularly after the 1896 elections, where the church actively tried to influence the result. In the Combined Court he pushed for the establishment of a national board of education, which was duly launched in 1908, and survived until 1924. He repeatedly lobbied to extend the vote to more citizens. At the turn of the twentieth century there was a minimum income, property or land requirement in order to register as a voter for national and municipal elections. This was initially set so high that the great majority of British Guiana's residents were disenfranchised. For municipal councillors, the income minimum was higher than that of electors. Over the years both requirements were lowered, to somewhere closer to universal suffrage, by the time of his death.

Thorne joined the Reform Association soon after his arrival in British Guiana, which by 1896 had merged into the larger Progressive Association. Elections at this stage were against named candidates rather than political parties, but the Progressive Association ran a slate of successful representatives in the 1896 Combined Court elections. Thorne, who was on the party's executive committee, did not stand in these elections but was recorded as having a decisive influence on the outcome. In later elections Thorne stood for elections under his own name, effectively as an independent. On Thorne's death in 1956, the Daily Chronicle said that Thorne was the first West Indian member of the British Labour Party.

Positions held:

- Georgetown City Council, 1902–1949
- British Guiana Combined Court (legislative body), 1906–1911, 1916–1921
- Georgetown Deputy Mayor, 1921, 1922, 1925
- Education Commission, 1924–1925
- Cost of Living Survey Committee, 1942
- Franchise Commission, 1942–1944
- Education Development Committee, 1943–1945
- British Guiana National Trade Council - Executive Officer, 1945
- Georgetown Fire Advisory Committee, 1945
- Georgetown Pure Water Supply Board, 1945–1946
- British Guiana Labour Union
- British Guiana Workers League, 1931–1952

== Trade union pioneer ==
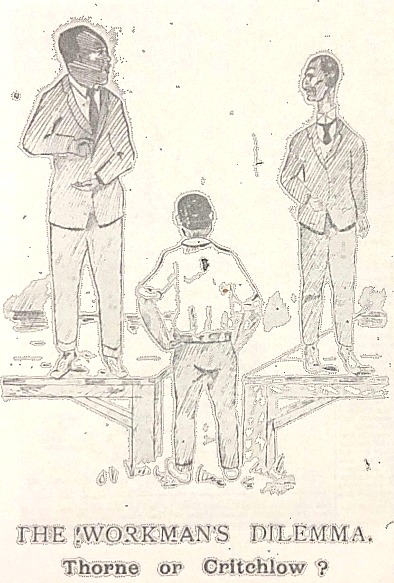
Cartoon depicting elections between the two prominent trade unionists of 1920s British Guiana, A. A. Thorne and Hubert Critchlow. Thorne is on the right side podium. The Daily Argosy, Sunday 1 February 1920.

Thorne was an early pioneer of the British Guiana Labour Union, the country's first registered workers union. He worked with other key figures in the creation of British Guiana's trade union movement, including Hubert Critchlow. Thorne's relationship with Critchlow did come under pressure at times, given that they were often competing for elected office within the trade union movement.

Thorne founded the British Guiana Workers' League in 1931, among the first workers' rights organizations in the western hemisphere and the second such organization in Guyana. He served as the League's president for 22 years. The League sought to protect human rights and improve the working conditions of Guyanese people of all ethnic backgrounds. The union's activities focused mostly on workplace safety to protect factory workers on the sugar plantation estates, municipal workers in Georgetown, and ward-maids at Georgetown Hospital. The efforts of Thorne, Critchlow and Jung Bahadur Singh successfully led to the establishment of seven additional labour unions beginning in 1938.

Thorne served as the inaugural president of the British Guiana Trades Union Council in 1941, with Critchlow as vice-president. Thorne's work for workplace safety guidelines and labour rights laid the foundation for the formation of the Manpower Citizens' Association, which he co-led. By 1943, it was the country's largest trade union. It subsequently spun off a political party which ran candidates for the 1947 legislative elections. In 1945, Thorne became one of the inaugural vice-presidents of the Caribbean Labour Congress, a multinational organization, of which the Trades Union Council was a founding member.

Upon hearing of Thorne's death in 1956, the general president of a large trade union, Cecil Cole of Sawmill and Forest Workers' Union, said: "It is through the huge contribution of men like (Thorne) that the Movement stands and is so strong as it is today. Many of us who can be styled indeed the younger generation certainly can well remember his selfless service, his willingness at all times to make the necessary sacrifice of his time, talent, and energy in the interest of the working classes. Those who are left behind can well follow his outstanding example."

=== Libel court case ===
In 1904 Thorne published an article in a Boston newspaper about the dominance of the sugar plantation owners and the sugar industry over all other economic sectors of the country. The planters arranged for an article of their own to be published in The Argosy, a local newspaper of Georgetown which was considered to sympathetic to plantation owners. The Argosy's claims were disproven in court, Thorne won his libel case against The Argosy, and was awarded £500 by the court. The court case is documented as one of the trials over the past 300 years that helped to shape the modern rule of law in Guyana, and the entire trial's transcript is published in Making of Modern Law: Trials, 1600–1926.

=== International impact ===
Thorne's first visit to the United States in 1904 was at the invitation of the New York City Mayor. During this U.S. visit, Thorne traveled across the America and delivered a keynote address to the President and Alumni of Wilberforce University, where the university's senate conferred upon Thorne the degree of Doctor of Laws (LLD), an honour which they had only conferred previously on two other men, U.S. President William McKinley, and Civil Rights Leader Frederick Douglass.

Thorne recognized that the abortive 1919 Colonisation Scheme - which suggested bringing in more labour from India to undercut local wages, and potentially reassigning British Guiana's status to a de facto colony of British India - created friction and inflamed racial tension. The then Attorney General was not well disposed to Thorne, and at one point suggested he was trying to send Bolsheviks into plantation communities to help undermine the Scheme. Despite the support from the plantation owners, and some members of the colonial government, the Scheme was quickly aborted. Thorne advocated for fair wages for all citizens and led the way for the passage of increased minimum wages for East Indians and Chinese workers (whose families had been brought to the country under indenture), and for African workers (whose forebears had been enslaved from Africa and trafficked to British Guiana).

From 1945, as Britain sought to extricate itself from the machinery of empire, proposals emerged for a West Indies Federation, a political and economic union of Britain's colonies in the region. A. A. Thorne was an early supporter of this concept, along with other figures on the Caribbean political left, notably C. L. R. James, as a pathway to unity within self-determination. The UK government also supported these proposals, albeit for very different reasons. The Federation was launched 18 months after Thorne's death, with British Guiana having observer status, but it collapsed four years later, under a welter of irreconcilable pressures.

Thorne helped to make the country's agricultural industry more internationally competitive by demonstrating how colonial control over rice production, a staple sustenance crop in the colony at the time, resulted in rice being priced higher in British Guiana than in neighboring countries and islands. One of Thorne's sons, the Ivy League-educated economics professor Alfred P. Thorne, built on these insights in reference to the global, widespread causes of economic under-development that result from sustained efforts to maintain a supply of low-cost labour in colonies and kingdoms in his books.

In 1949 Thorne, by this stage 78 years old, travelled to London as part of a delegation to discuss the Post War development of sugar production in the West Indies. Thorne's influence as a historical figure in British Guiana, with international recognition, was all the more remarkable given that he was originally from Barbados, of which he remained proud, yet dedicated his efforts in his adopted home.

== Family ==
A. A. Thorne married schoolteacher and artist Catherine Elizabeth McLean in October 1895, and then became a widower upon her death. In July 1912, he married a teacher named Violet Janet Ashurst (1892–1991). Ashurst was born in New Amsterdam and raised in British Guiana, the daughter of Charles Ashurst and Elizabeth Jane Alexander. Her family was from Belfast and Ethiopia. A. A. Thorne remained married to Violet for the rest of his life. A. A. Thorne had ten children, five from each wife. These were seven sons, three daughters, of which there were two sets of twins. From his first wife he had Alfred Hubert as his first son, then twin brothers, Albert Athiel and Alfred McLean, finally twin sisters Alfreda and Elfreda. From his second wife he had firstly Alfred Palmerston in 1913, then Duncan John in 1914, Arthur George, Aileen, and finally Cecil.

His oldest son by Violet, Alfred Palmerston Thorne, was a Fulbright scholar and economics professor.

== Death ==
After a long lifetime of public service, A.A. Thorne died in the early hours of Monday 23 April 1956 at Georgetown Public Hospital. He was 86 years old. His funeral took place the same day at St. George's Cathedral, Georgetown, and he was laid to rest at Le Repentir Cemetery.

Upon hearing of Thorne's death in 1956, the president of a large trade union, Cecil Cole of Sawmill and Forest Workers' Union, honored Thorne as a Champion of the People, writing: "It is through the huge contribution of men like (Thorne) that the Movement stands and is so strong as it is today. Many of us who can be styled indeed the younger generation certainly can well remember his selfless service, his willingness at all times to make the necessary sacrifice of his time, talent, and energy in the interest of the working classes. Those who are left behind can well follow his outstanding example."

== Reputation and legacy ==
Daly, writing in 1943 while Thorne was still politically active, described Thorne as a "thorn by name and by nature" but with a sober "muscular socialism" in his approach to social justice, similar to that of Sidney Webb, a leading intellectual in the Fabian Society. He was described as an electrifying speaker, and the wording of some of his motions in the Combined Court legislature suggests he was more than willing to use dramatic language to advance his point of view. Thorne's record, as an educator, political activist and trade unionist, suggests that he was deeply rooted in the cause of civil rights and socialism. Equally Thorne developed a reputation of working with the realities of the colonial administration, seeking concessions where possible. He worked with many of the 19 governors of British Guiana over the 62 years that Thorne dedicated to public service, and tried to extract the best outcomes within the limits of their different constraints. On his death, one newspaper noted that Thorne was "a fearless man and a great advocate of moral values." His role in the development of education, the future careers of his former students, and the trade union movement in Guyana had an impact that survived his death in 1956. His contribution to Guyana's civic and political development has been described as "titanic" and "immense".

== Publications ==
- 'On Industrial Training in British Guiana', Timehri: The Journal of the Royal Agricultural and Commercial Society of British Guiana, 1911 & 1912
- 'Education in British Guiana, Part I', Timehri: The Journal of the Royal Agricultural and Commercial Society of British Guiana, 1911
- 'Education in British Guiana, Part II', Timehri: The Journal of the Royal Agricultural and Commercial Society of British Guiana, Vol. 11, (third series), (1912).
- 'British Guianese Progress and Limitations', Timehri: The Journal of the Royal Agricultural and Commercial Society of British Guiana, Vo1. II, (third series), (1912).
- 'A. A. Thorne v. The Argosy Co., Ltd. and W. Macdonald' (BiblioLife Network, Harvard Law School Library), 1905

No substantive standalone biography has been written about A. A. Thorne.

== See also ==
- Alfred P. Thorne
- Hubert Critchlow
