= 1906 British Guiana general election =

General elections were held in British Guiana in 1906.

== Electoral system ==
The elections were held under the 1891 constitution, which provided for a 16-member Court of Policy, half of which was elected. The Court included the Governor, seven government officials (the Attorney General, the Government Secretary, the Immigration Agent General and the Receiver General, together with three other appointees). The eight elected members were elected from seven constituencies; Demerara East, Demerara West, Essequebo North Western, Essequebo South Eastern, Berbice, City of Georgetown (2 members) and New Amsterdam.

In addition, six "Financial Representatives" were also elected in six single member constituencies; Demerara, Essequebo North Western, Essequebo South Eastern, Berbice, Georgetown and New Amsterdam. Together with the Court of Policy, the two groups formed the Combined Court.

The franchise was restricted on the basis of a minimum income level, and women could not vote; as a result, only 1.19% of the population were entitled to vote.

== Results ==
Ten of the elected members were pro-reform candidates, including seven who were members of the People's Association.

Constituency	Elected member
Court of Policy
Demerara East	Francis Dias
Demerara West	Andrew Benjamin Brown
Essequebo North Western	R G Duncan
Essequebo South Eastern	P N Browne
Berbice	J P Santos
City of Georgetown	George Garnett
City of Georgetown	B Howell Jones
New Amsterdam	C P Garcia
Financial Representatives
Demerara	J Wood Davis
Essequebo North Western	Alfred A. Thorne
Essequebo South Eastern	J S McArthur
Berbice	S E Wills
Georgetown	A P P Mackey
New Amsterdam	S E Wreford
Source: Bayley
