= A. R. F. Webber =

Tobago-born Guyanese writer (1880–1932)

- Born: 1 January 1880; Scarborough, Tobago
- Died: 29 June 1932 (aged 52); British Guiana
- Occupation(s): Politician, author and newspaper editor
- Spouse: Beatrice Elizabeth Glassford
- Children: 2
- Parents: James Frances Webber (father); Sarah Webber née Hope (mother)
- Relatives: Wilson Harris (wife's nephew)

Albert Raymond Forbes Webber FRGS (1 January 1880 – 29 June 1932) was a Tobago-born Guyanese politician, author and newspaper editor.

He was author of Those That Be in Bondage: A Tale of Indian Indentures and Sunlit Western Waters (1917), a novel described as "a strange mixture of romantic sentimentality and protest against the treatment of East Indian indentured labourers on Guyanese plantations", and Centenary History and Handbook of British Guiana (1931).

== Early life ==
Webber was born in Scarborough, Tobago, to Sarah (née Hope) and James Frances Webber and baptised in the Wesleyan-Methodist Church. Around 1890, Webber's parents separated and his father migrated to British Guiana to join his two half-brothers, Ernest and Percival Forbes. In 1899, Webber migrated to British Guiana and married Beatrice Elizabeth Glassford in 1899. Between 1906 and 1910, Webber worked for several gold producers, before working in advertising, first for the Daily Argosy newspaper and later for Booker Brothers, the largest conglomerate in British Guiana.

== Journalism ==
In 1919, he became editor of another newspaper, the Daily Chronicle, a position he held until 1925. Between 1925 and 1930 he was editor of the New Daily Chronicle. In 1929 he helped launch the West Indian Press Association.

== Political involvement ==
In 1921 Webber got involved in politics and was elected a Financial Representatives in the Combined Court, British Guiana's legislated body. By 1925 he was seen as a leader of the Afro-Guyanese and Indo-Guyanese people. In response to British attempts to reduce electoral involvement and transform British Guiana into a crown colony, Webber helped form the Popular Party, the first political party in the British West Indies. As Webber became more involved in politics he became involved in the British Guiana Labour Union.

== Literary career ==
Webber wrote poetry, fiction and non-fiction. According to historian Selwyn Cudjoe, Webber's oldest-known published work consists of three poems—"What of a Night", "Wisdom Cometh in the Morning" and "The Jealous Scribe"—which were published in the Daily Chronicle in January and February 1916. Louis Ross, Webber's cousin, recounted to Cudjoe that he believed that Webber had started a literary magazine with Everil Ross, Louis' older brother, around 1910.

Webber published his only novel, Those That Be in Bondage in 1917. This was followed by a book of poems, Glints from an Anvil in 1919 and An Innocent's Pilgrimage, a travelogue of his journey to the United Kingdom in 1926 as part of the Guyanese delegation to the West Indian Conference, which was published in 1927. His final work, the Centenary History and Handbook of British Guiana, was published in 1931.

== Other achievements ==
In 1929, Webber was elected a Fellow of the Royal Geographical Society.
