= Senate (British Guiana) =

The Senate was the upper house of the Legislature in British Guiana between 1961 and 1964.

== History ==
A new constitution was promulgated on 18 July 1961, replacing the unicameral Legislative Council with the legislature. The new body consisted of a 13-member Senate and a 36-member Legislative Assembly. The 13 members of the Senate were nominated, with eight nominated by the ruling party, three by the opposition and two by the Governor. Of the 36 Legislative Assembly members, 35 were elected in single-member constituencies, and the elected MPs then elected a Speaker.

Elections to the new Legislature were held on 21 August 1961, and both houses convened for the first time on 5 October 1961. In the Senate, Ashton Chase was elected President and Cyril Victor Too Chung Vice President. The People's National Congress (PNC) were allocated two of the Senate seats reserved for the opposition, with one given to the United Force. However, the PNC claimed they should have been given all three seats, and its members attempted to block Governor Richard Luyt from entering the legislature on the day of its ceremonial opening on 6 October, requiring the police to remove them.

Further constitutional amendments in 1964 scrapped the legislature, replacing it with a unicameral House of Assembly. The legislature was dissolved on 25 September 1964.
