= Progressive Association =

The Progressive Association was a political party in British Guiana.

== History ==
The party was established in 1887 by Patrick Dargan, who led it until his death in 1908. It later absorbed the Portuguese-founded Reform Association. In the 1897 general elections the party supported several candidates, including Dargan and Andrew Benjamin Brown; almost all of them were elected.
