= Patrick Muir Renison =

British colonial administrator (1911-1965)

Sir Patrick Muir Renison GCMG (24 March 1911 – 10 November 1965) was a British colonial administrator.

== Biography ==
Renison was born in 1911 in Rock Ferry, England. He attended Uppingham School, and later Corpus Christi College, Cambridge.

He entered the Colonial Administrative Service in 1932 and was seconded to the Colonial Office. In 1936 he moved to Ceylon where he was appointed to the Ceylon Civil Service. He would remain in Ceylon until 1944, during which time he would hold a number of Civil Service posts across the country.

Following the Second World War, Renison was asked to assist the Colonial Office's plans for post-war recruitment. In 1947 he returned to the United Kingdom whereupon he was appointed an Assistant Secretary in the Colonial Office. In 1948 he began work as Colonial Secretary of Trinidad and Tobago.

Rension was appointed Governor of British Honduras in 1952, a post he held until 1955. On 25 October 1955 he took up the position of Governor of British Guiana. He left the post in 1958 and served as Governor of Kenya between 1959 and 1962.

He died in Marylebone, London on 10 November 1965, aged 54. His daughter, Anne Willoughby Renison, married Hugh Cholmondeley, 5th Baron Delamere (1934−2024).

Government offices
| Preceded by Alfred Savage | Governors of British Guiana; 1955–1958 | Succeeded by Ralph Grey |
