= The Argosy (newspaper) =

Newspaper published in British Guiana between 1880 and 1907

The Argosy was a newspaper published in Georgetown, Demerara, in British Guiana (later Guyana) from 2 October 1880 to 30 March 1907. It became the Weekly Argosy with effect from the issue of 6 April 1907 and ceased publication with the issue of 24 October 1908. It was founded by James Thompson.

== Publishing ==
The Argosy was contracted by the government to print ‘The Official Gazette’ as well as agricultural reports and mining data. In 1909, The Argosy published a Handbook of British Guiana. At the time, they listed 3 papers in circulation; The Daily Argosy, The Argosy (weekly), and The Sportsman's Argosy (weekly, Mondays).

The Argosy has been described as representing the planter interest in British Guiana.

== Legacy ==
The paper's reporting of births, marriages, and deaths make it an important primary source for genealogists interested in British Guiana. A compilation of its family notices is held on microfilm at the British Library.

In 1979, its columns were also a primary source for Walter Rodney's Guyanese Sugar Plantations in the Late Nineteenth Century: A Contemporary Description from the "Argosy" (Release Publishers, Georgetown).
