= 1961 British Guiana general election =

- 21 August 1961

35 seats in the Legislative Assembly 18 seats needed for a majority
- Registered: 246,120
- Turnout: 89.44%
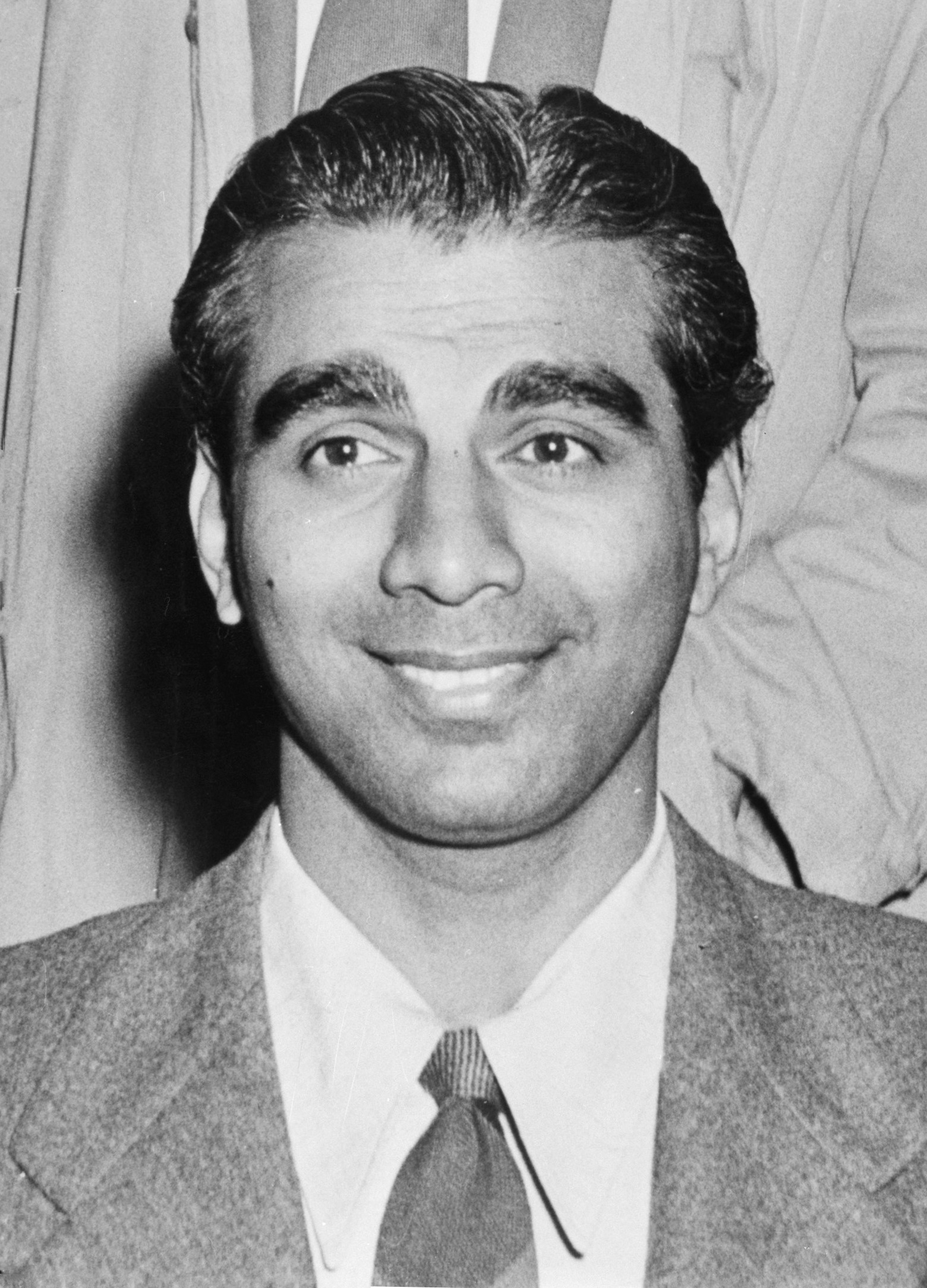

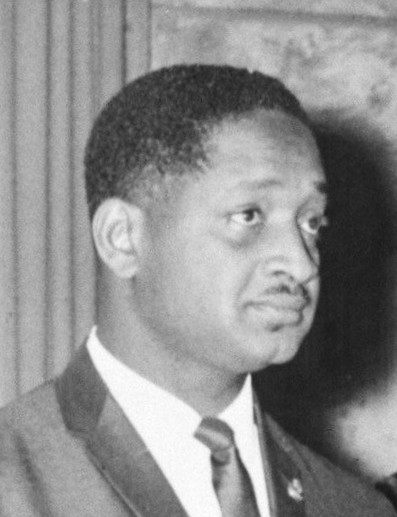

	First party	Second party	Third party
Leader	Cheddi Jagan	Forbes Burnham	Peter D'Aguiar
Party	PPP	PNC	TUF
Seats won	20	11	4
Seat change	▲11	▲7	New
Popular vote	93,085	89,501	35,771
Percentage	42.63%	40.99%	16.38%
Swing	▼4.88pp	▲15.5pp	New
Premier before election
Cheddi Jagan
PPP
Elected Premier
Cheddi Jagan
PPP

General elections were held in British Guiana on 21 August 1961. The result was a victory for the People's Progressive Party, which won 20 of the 35 seats.

== Electoral system ==
The elections were the first to be held under the 1961 constitution, which had created a bicameral Legislature with an appointed Senate and an elected Legislative Assembly. The 36 members of the Legislative Assembly included 35 members elected in single-member constituencies and the Speaker, who was elected by the other members. The 13 members of the Senate included eight nominated by the ruling party, three by the opposition and two by the Governor.

== Campaign ==
A total of 98 candidates contested the elections. The PPP ran 29 candidates, the People's National Congress 35 and the United Force 34.

== Results ==
Party	Votes	%	Seats	+/–
People's Progressive Party	93,085	42.63	20	+11
People's National Congress	89,501	40.99	11	+7
United Force	35,771	16.38	4	New
Total	218,357	100.00	35	+21
Valid votes	218,357	99.20		
Invalid/blank votes	1,768	0.80		
Total votes	220,125	100.00		
Registered voters/turnout	246,120	89.44		
Source: GECOM

Following the elections, the People's National Congress (PNC) were allocated two of the Senate seats reserved for the opposition, with one given to the United Force. The PNC claimed they should have been given all three seats, and its members attempted to block Governor Richard Luyt from entering the Legislature for its ceremonial opening on 6 October, requiring the police to remove them.

== Aftermath ==
Although the PPP had only received 1.6% more of the vote than the new People's National Congress, it had won almost double the number of seats. This resulted in mass demonstrations led by the PNC, a general strike and severe inter-racial violence. After a few weeks the British authorities intervened by sending in troops and the Governor declared a state of emergency. Following these events, the country's electoral system was changed to use proportional representation. The first elections held under the new system took place in 1964.
