= Alfred P. Thorne =

Photograph of Alfred P. Thorne

Alfred Palmerston Thorne (May 4, 1913 – August 12, 2012) was a development economist, international consultant and educator. He was a featured university lecturer at a number of international campuses including Oxford University. Authoring many articles on the economic development experience of developing countries, his scholarly works were published by Harvard University, Massachusetts Institute of Technology, Oxford Economic Papers, University of Puerto Rico, and University of the West Indies. Among other works, Dr. Thorne authored the Size, Structure and Growth of the Economy of Jamaica: A National Economic Accounts Study. The monograph traces the flow of national income throughout the country's economic sectors. It was very well received and has been collected by and taught at institutions and libraries across the globe. Thorne was also a contributor to Development Without Aid by Leopold Kohr in which he wrote an introduction and rebuttal to the book's major premise.

Alfred P. Thorne received his PhD in Economics and Masters in Business Administration from Columbia University, and received a BComm Honors from the London School of Economics. He became a consultant to the Puerto Rico Planning Board and Department of Commerce, the United Nations, USAID, CIDES and several nations. He witnessed the regime change against Professor Juan Bosch in the Dominican Republic and was an active member of the Instituto de Estudios del Caribe (IEC), the International Association for Research in Income and Wealth. He corresponded with Noam Chomsky and Jan Tinbergen, and Ernst Schumacher asked to meet with him when Schumacher visited Puerto Rico.

== Personal life ==
Alfred P. Thorne was the first child of Alfred Athiel Thorne (A. A. Thorne) and Violet Janet Ashurst.

=== Early life and education ===
Alfred P. Thorne was born in Georgetown, British Guiana on May 4, 1913, to a prominent family. His father was Alfred Athiel Thorne, a highly popular and influential statesman, served as mayor of British Guiana's capital city Georgetown, founded and led the British Guiana Worker's League in 1931 (one of the first human rights and labor rights organizations in the Western Hemisphere), and educator who established one of the first free co-educational private secondary schools in the world to admit students based on merit regardless of gender, ethnicity, color, religion, or socioeconomic status. Alfred P. Thorne's mother was Violet Janet Thorne (née Ashurst), an educator, artist, and mother of four sons and a daughter.

Alfred P. Thorne was an outstanding scholar who excelled in the British education system. He passed the Oxford and Cambridge Joint Board in 1929. He was fluent in English, Spanish, French, Latin and also proficient at reading and writing classical Greek and Latin to Oxford/Cambridge standards. During World War II, he completed his extramural studies and earned a B.Com. (Honors) from the London School of Economics at the University of London in 1941.

In 1950 he earned a master's degree from Columbia University Graduate School of Business. In May, 1958 he received official notification from the Columbia University Department of Economics that his doctoral thesis had been accepted and was awarded a PhD in economics.

=== Marriage and Family ===
Alfred P. Thorne married Edith Vivienne Thorne (née Campbell) in Georgetown, British Guiana on January 5, 1946, at St. Sidwell's Church Lodge. Vivienne was the second daughter of Mr. Charles A. Campbell. She had been a child prodigy at the piano and later went on to earn a master's degree in economics. Together with his wife, Thorne raised two children: Hugh C. Thorne and Alfred Thorne Jr.

Thorne took early retirement from the University of Puerto Rico in 1977 to care for his youngest son, Alfred Jr., who had been diagnosed with a terminal illness years earlier. Thorne moved to New York in 1982 to resume his research work, which culminated in a book titled Poor By Design, published in 2012. The book was completed with one of his granddaughters, Malaika Thorne, and chronicled on the blog Unraveling Poverty.

== Career ==
=== British Guiana ===
Dr. Thorne's career as an economist began in 1945 when he was recruited by Sir Winston Churchill's cousin, Oscar A. Spencer, first economic adviser to the Governor of British Guiana, to assist with the country's first economic development plan. Alfred P. Thorne was tasked with forecasting the gross domestic product and national income for policy-making and planning.

=== New York City ===
In 1950, Columbia University Professor Carl S. Schoup, Alfred Thorne's former professor, recruited Thorne to join a team of leading economists to diagnose and analyze the financial problems of New York City. The team's work was published under the title The Financial Problems of the City of New York in 1952.

=== Innovative View of Development in Jamaica ===
He was invited to join the research staff of the University of the West Indies in December of 1953. During his time there, he conducted a study that was published as a national income study of the economy of Jamaica, funded by the university, the British Government and the Government of Jamaica. It was the first disciplined and thorough look at the developing economy of Jamaica. Thorne's approach to the study was an innovation that used accounting as a framework to trace the flow of income from one economic sector to the next. The report of this study was published as the monograph in 1955. The monograph was praised for its innovations in national income accounting and use in economic planning and forecasting in a review by Professor Ursula Hicks of Oxford University. The February, 1957 review referred to as "...sufficient to demonstrate to any developing country the great value of such knowledge for the successful planning of the development process." The monograph also became required reading at some of the leading universities. The research published in that study has been widely utilized by economists.

=== Global Work ===
From 1955 to 1965 Alfred P. Thorne joined the faculty of the newly created University of Puerto Rico Graduate School Economics. Two years later he was invited to be a consultant on Planning Board of the Office of the Governor of Puerto Rico. He was editor and published in Caribbean Studies, the premier publication of The Institute of Caribbean Studies, established in 1958 as part of the Faculty of Social Sciences. It is the first interdisciplinary research center in the region with the "Greater Caribbean" as its field of inquiry. Its mission is to conduct, support and divulge academic research of the region in the disciplines of Social Sciences and the Humanities. It includes original works and book reviews in English, Spanish and French.

In June of 1959, he was invited to present a paper at First Latin American Regional Conference organized by the United Nations and International Association for Research In Income and Wealth, in Rio de Janeiro, Brazil. An English version of the paper was published in Harvard University's The Review of Economics and Statistics, November, 1962, titled "Sector Income Accounting and Analysis for Latin American and Caribbean Economies—More Appropriate Equations".

From 1961 to 1962 he was a guest lecturer at Oxford University for Professors Frankel and Ursula Hicks. He was offered a full-time post at the university, but for family reasons could not accept. During the 1960s he also served as a council member of the International Association for Research in Income and Wealth and was invited to be a non-resident member at Queen Elizabeth House.

Between June 23-38, 1963, he presented a paper titled "A Critical Analysis of the Statistical and Economic Factors in the Growth Rates of Puerto Rico and Jamaica, 1950-59" at the 1963 conference of the International Association for the Research in Income and Wealth held in Corfu, Greece.

He returned to the University of Puerto Rico and became a consultant to the United States Agency for International Development (USAID) the following year. Through his work as a consultant, he visited various Caribbean countries and formally proposed development plans to the U. S. government regarding economic development in these countries.

In the summer of 1964 he was a U.S.-sponsored visiting professor Universidad Mayor de San Francisco Xavier and Universidad Mayor de San Andres in La Paz, Bolivia. From January through June of the following year, he was a visiting professor at Rutgers University. He became a professor at the newly formed Graduate School of Planning, University of Puerto Rico in August 1965. He also taught courses at the Universidad Autonoma de Santo Domingo.

=== Research ===
During the 1969–70 academic year, Dr. Thorne took a sabbatical during which he traveled around the world to conduct research on what became his last book. His travels included visiting the London—British Library, where he focused economic policies in the former British colonies. He also visited Paris—Les Archives, to study material related to what had been the French colonies. During that visit, he met with Dr. Bernard Gazes, France's chief economist and learned about France's approaches to making its economic policies. During his visit to the Netherlands he had a comparable interview with Professor Jan Tinbergen, who had just won the Nobel Prize for Economics, regarding similar matters on economic policy formation in the Netherlands.

During the same trip, he interviewed Norway and Sweden's chief economists and with Malta's Minister of Finance. Dr. Thorne also visited Senegal, Ivory Coast, Liberia, Ghana, Nigeria, Kenya, Ethiopia and interviewed both government officials and with non-government persons. He also obtained relevant economic policy information for Pakistan and India, Malaysia, Singapore, Hong Kong and Taiwan through relevant officials in those countries. He also stopped in Tokyo briefly before returning to Puerto Rico.

Alfred P. Thorne warned the Puerto Rican government of the unsustainable trajectory that the country was traveling on in an OpEd published in the San Juan Star in 1972.

He retired from the University of Puerto Rico in 1977. His work has been collected by universities, banks and other institutions of higher learning around the globe.

His last book is the culmination of his experiences and years of research. It explains why some underdeveloped countries remain so after many decades of economic stagnation for their poorest inhabitants.
