= 1926 British Guiana general election =

General elections were held in British Guiana on 15 October 1926.

== Electoral system ==
The elections were held under the 1891 constitution, which provided for a 16-member Court of Policy, half of which was elected. The Court included the Governor, seven government officials (the Attorney General, the Government Secretary, the Immigration Agent General and the Receiver General, together with three other appointees). The eight elected members were elected from seven constituencies; Demerara East, Demerara West, Essequebo North Western, Essequebo South Eastern, Berbice, City of Georgetown (2 members) and New Amsterdam.

In addition, six "Financial Representatives" were also elected in six single member constituencies; Demerara, Essequebo North Western, Essequebo South Eastern, Berbice, Georgetown and New Amsterdam. Together with the Court of Policy, the two groups formed the Combined Court.

The franchise was restricted on the basis of a minimum income level, and women could not vote; as a result, only 11,103 people were registered to vote from a population of 317,026 (3.5%).

== Campaign ==
The Popular Party, which had been formed earlier in the year, was the only party to contest the elections, and campaigned on a platform of economic development. Conservative candidates also criticised the lack of development within the territory.

== Results ==
The People's Party won twelve of the fourteen elected seats.

== Aftermath ==
Following the elections, the results in almost every seat was challenged, resulting in five results being overturned on technicalities.
