= The Royal Agricultural and Commercial Society of British Guiana =

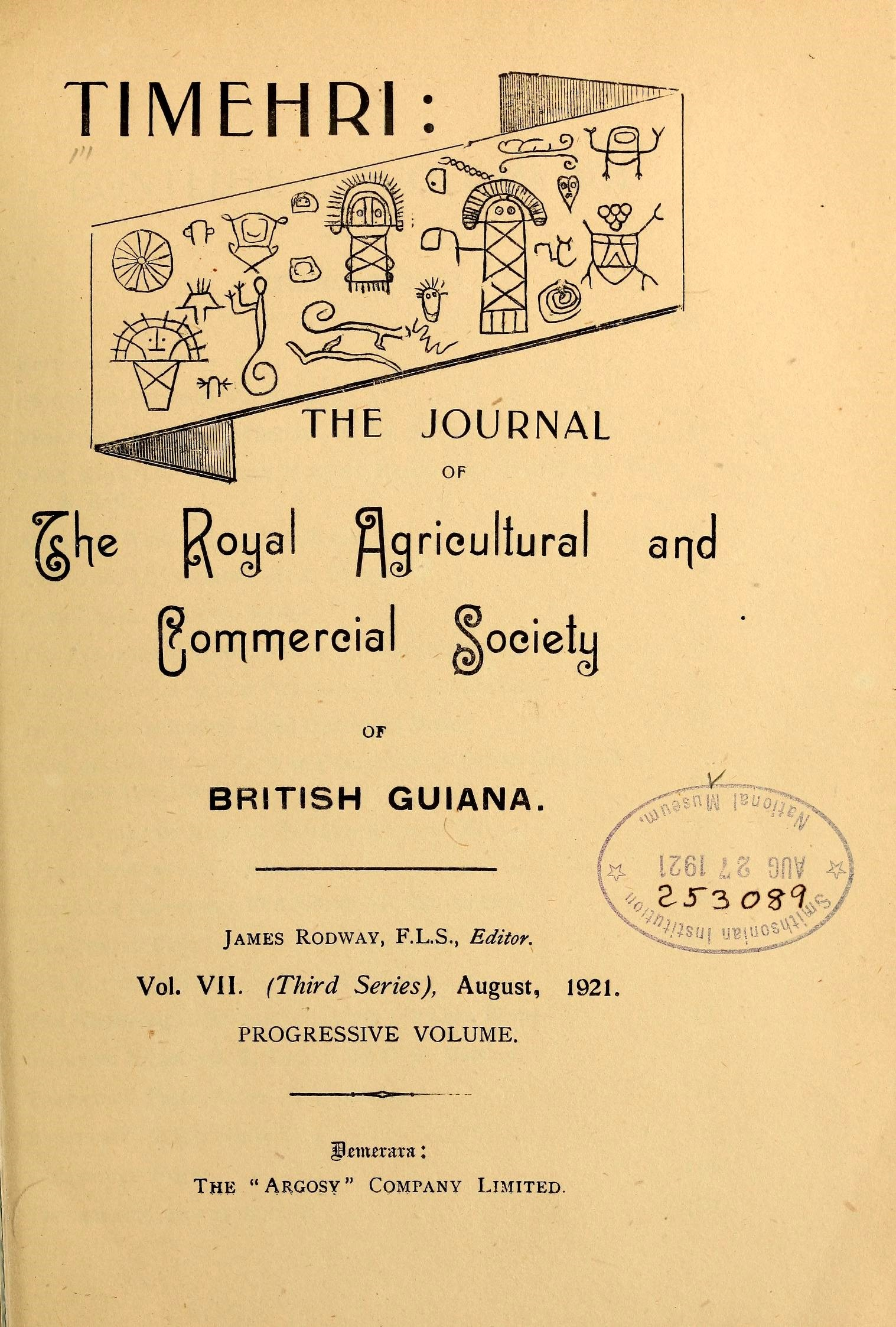
Timehri, 1921.

The Royal Agricultural and Commercial Society of British Guiana was established in Georgetown, British Guiana, modern Guyana, on 18 March 1844. It acquired its "Royal" prefix in 1853 when Queen Victoria became its patron.

The Guyanese scholar James Rodway was the long-serving editor of its journal, Timehri.

The society's museum eventually became the Guyana National Museum.

The society ceased to have royal patronage in 1972 and became the Guyana Society. It closed in 1975 after which its library was divided amongst various other institutions.
