= Edward Brandis Denham =

British colonial administrator

Sir Edward Brandis Denham GCMG KBE

Governor of the Gambia
- In office 29 November 1928 – 11 September 1930
- Monarch: George V
- Preceded by: John Middleton
- Succeeded by: Richmond Palmer

Governor of British Guiana
- In office 9 June 1930 – 26 March 1935
- Monarch: George V
- Preceded by: Frederick Gordon Guggisberg
- Succeeded by: Geoffry Alexander Stafford Northcote

Governor of Jamaica
- In office 24 October 1935 – 2 June 1938
- Monarchs: George V Edward VIII; George VI
- Preceded by: Arthur S. Jelf (acting)
- Succeeded by: Charles Campbell Woolley (acting)

Personal details
- Born: 1876
- Died: 2 June 1938 (aged 61–62)

Sir Edward Brandis Denham GCMG KBE (1876 – 2 Jun 1938) was a British colonial administrator. He served as Governor of the Gambia (1928–1930), British Guiana (1930–1935) and Jamaica (1935–1938).

== Life ==
Edward Brandis Denham was educated at Malvern College and Merton College, Oxford. Joining the colonial service as a cadet in the Ceylon Civil Service, he later served as colonial secretary of Mauritius (1920–1923) and acting governor of Kenya (1923–1928). He became Governor of the Gambia in November 1928, finding it hard to deal with the general strike called by the Bathurst Trade Union in late 1929. In January 1930 he left the Gambia to become Governor of British Guiana.

He was appointed Governor of Jamaica by the colonial office in 1935. His short three-year stint was troubled with political and social unrest. There had been serious riots at the docks in Kingston and Falmouth in May and October 1935. 1938 opened with a cane cutters' strike on Serge Island Estate in the parish of St. Thomas. In response, Governor Denham fired off anxious telegrams to the colonial office in London. To head off trouble, Governor Denham appointed commissions to investigate wage rates and unemployment, followed by emergency public works initiatives.

The Governor found the islands' problems complex and difficult to solve. Denham thought the real problems of Jamaica were less economic than political. The recent emergence of a group of well-educated mixed-raced Jamaican politicians posed the main threat to British colonial rule. Imperialism and democracy proved difficult to merge, but a system of democratic ruling of the Jamaican people allowed Sir Edward Denham to continue his rule of the islands.

Denham died of a heart attack at Kings House, the Governors' residence, on 2 June 1938. On Friday 3 June 1938 the crew of HMS Ajax (22) buried the Jamaican Governor's body at sea at sunset outside the three-mile limit offshore after his bronze coffin was taken to the ship on a gun carriage. King George VI sent a cable to Jamaica "I have learned with the deepest regret of the death in Jamaica of Sir Edward Denham. Captain General and Governor-in-chief. In him, the Empire has lost a public servant of long experience and distinguished ability. His death is a grave loss to the colony and will, I know, bring sorrow to the hearts of all my people in Jamaica".

In 1944, six years after his death, Jamaicans were granted universal adult suffrage, an idea initiated by Governor Edward Denham. An area in the western section of Kingston called 'Denham Town' is named after him and in his memory the Sir Edward Denham Memorial Prize is awarded at Royal College Colombo since 1939.

Denham was appointed a Companion of the Order of St Michael and St George (CMG) in the 1922 New Year Honours, a Knight Commander of the Order of the British Empire (KBE) in the 1927 Birthday Honours, promoted to Knight Commander of the Order of St Michael and St George (KCMG) in the 1931 New Year Honours, and further promoted to Knight Grand Cross of the Order (GCMG) in the 1935 New Year Honours.

Government offices
Preceded by Sir John Middleton	Governor of The Gambia; 1928–1930	Succeeded by Herbert Richmond Palmer
Preceded by Gordon Guggisberg	Governor of British Guiana; 1930–1935	Succeeded by Geoffry Northcote
Preceded by A. S. Jeef, acting	Governor of Jamaica; 1935–1938	Succeeded by Charles Campbell Woolley, acting
