= Legislature (British Guiana) =

The Legislature was the parliament of British Guiana between 1961 and 1964. A bicameral body, it consisted of an appointed Senate and an elected Legislative Assembly.

== History ==
A new constitution was promulgated on 18 July 1961, replacing the unicameral Legislative Council with the legislature. The new body consisted of a 13-member Senate and a 36-member Legislative Assembly. The 13 members of the Senate were nominated, with eight nominated by the ruling party, three by the opposition and two by the Governor. Of the 36 Legislative Assembly members, 35 were elected in single-member constituencies, and the elected MPs then elected a Speaker.

Elections to the new Legislature were held on 21 August 1961. Both houses convened for the first time on 5 October 1961, when members elected Rahman Gajraj as Speaker of the Legislative Assembly and Ashton Chase as President of the Senate.

Further constitutional amendments in 1964 scrapped the legislature, replacing it with a unicameral House of Assembly. The legislature was dissolved on 25 September 1964.
