= Hugh Lyle Carmichael =

Lieutenant-General Sir Hugh Lyle Carmichael
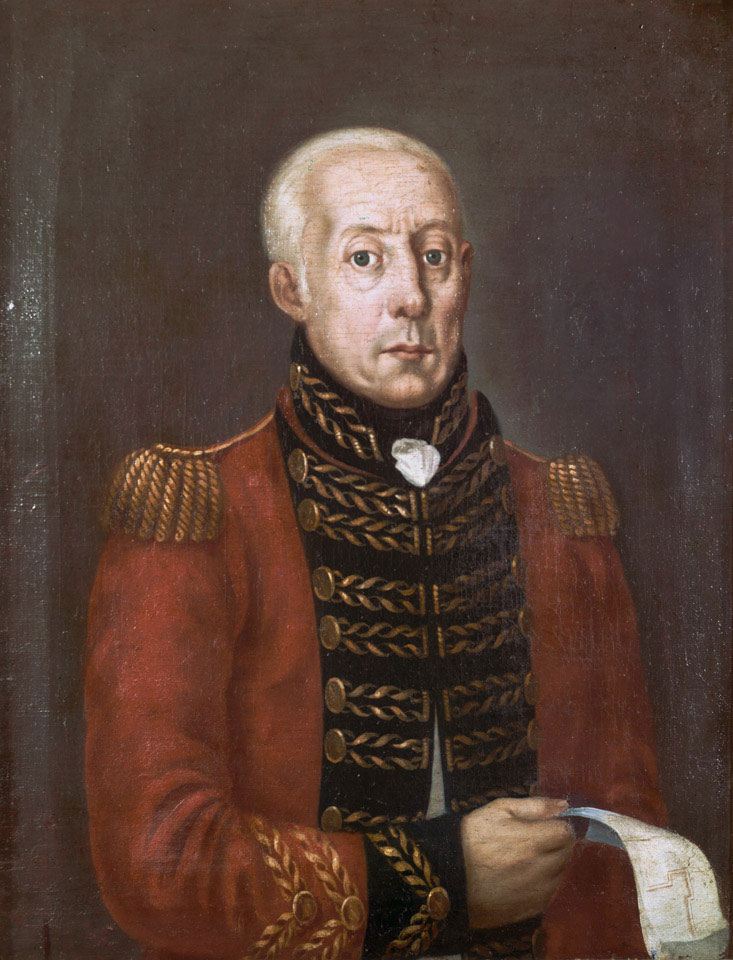
- c. 1809 portrait of Carmichael
- Born: 1764; Dublin, Ireland
- Died: 11 May 1813 (aged 48–49); Demerara, the Guianas
- Military career
- Allegiance: Great Britain; United Kingdom
- Branch: British Army
- Rank: Lieutenant general
- Conflicts: French Revolutionary and Napoleonic Wars

Lieutenant-General Sir Hugh Lyle Carmichael (1764 – 11 May 1813) was a British Army officer and colonial administrator who served as the lieutenant-governor of Demerara and Essequibo from 1812 to 1813, when he died in office. He also was commander of the British forces at the 1808 siege of Santo Domingo and was a strong proponent of giving the West India Regiments equal treatment to white British troops.

== Life ==
Born at Dublin, Ireland, in 1764, he was the son of Hugh Carmichael (1720–1776) and his wife Elizabeth, daughter of Hugh Lyle, of Coleraine, County Londonderry; formerly the captain of a regiment of dragoons. His grandfather, Andrew Carmichael (1675–1759), was the grandson of Samuel, brother of the 2nd Lord Carmichael. Andrew came from Scotland to Northern Ireland where he was Provost of Dungannon and married at Killyleagh his cousin, Anne Montgomery, niece of Hugh Montgomery, 1st Earl of Mount Alexander. Carmichael's sister, Eleanor, married the son and heir of Theaker Wilder, nephew of James Steuart, Admiral of the Fleet.

Carmichael recognised the value and usefulness of recruiting Black troops into British Army, which happened in 1795 when the War Office authorised the raising of eight West India Regiments (WIR). In 1797, he wrote that the regiments were not only critical militarily, but their strength and stamina had been proven when they carried white British soldiers through the heat and over the rocks in Grenada. He campaigned for WIR soldiers to be given the right to give evidence at military tribunals. White and Black soldiers alike were often flogged for violating military rules, but Carmichael found a more humane method to be equally as effective; during his eleven years as lieutenant colonel of the 2nd West India Regiment, Carmichael instead demoted Black offenders to a position resembling that of field slaves: deprived of weapons and appointments and employed only on fatigue duties.

Carmichael had started his military career as an ensign in the 67th Regiment of Foot, and was promoted to Lieutenant in 1783. He served as a captain in Lord Strathaven's privately raised regiment, before returning to the British Regulars with the same rank in 1794. In 1797, he was appointed lieutenant-colonel of the 2nd West India Regiment.

In 1801, with Arthur Whetham, he was appointed full colonel and brigadier-general of the Leeward Islands. Between 1801 and 1802, Carmichael served as acting Governor of British Tobago. In 1803, he was appointed Brigadier-General of Jamaica. In 1808, now a major-general, Carmichael was despatched to end the French occupation of Santo Domingo. In command of six frigates of the Royal Navy, Carmichael supported the Siege of Santo Domingo. In June 1809, in command of the 2nd West Indian, 54th, 55th, and Royal Irish regiments, Carmichael embarked from Polingue Bay, and persuaded General Juan Sánchez Ramírez to capture San Carlos Church on the outskirts of the capital, cutting off communication between Santo Domingo and Fort Jeronimo. Carmichael installed heavy siege batteries around the capital and massed his forces ready for an assault until the French surrendered, 9 July 1809.

In 1812, he was appointed Lieutenant Governor of Demerara Essequibo. Although he died in May the following year, he made several lasting changes in his short time as governor. In May 1812, he changed the name of the capital from Stabroek to Georgetown, in honour of George III. Dutch had been the official language of the courts but Carmichael ordered all legal documents to be written in both Dutch and English. His administration encountered stiff opposition from the Dutch planters who held influence at the Court of Policy, and particularly the College of Kiezers, which was held to be their exclusive domain. Without even first receiving approval from Britain, Carmichael took decisive action and abolished the College of Kiezers, handing over its duties to the Financial Representatives in the Court of Policy. Towards the end of 1812, the United States of America went to war with Britain. In September, American warships formed a blockade around Georgetown. Under Carmichael, a British force stationed in Georgetown launched a successful attack on the Americans and drove them from Guyana's shores.

Carmichael had married Catherine, the only surviving daughter and sole heiress of John Ferrall of Jervis Street, Dublin. In compliance with her father's will she became known as Lady Catherine Carmichael-Ferrall. They were survived by one son, Colonel John Carmichael, father of Captain John Jervis O'Ferrall Carmichael-Ferrall (d.1904) RN, of Augher Castle, County Tyrone.

Government offices
Preceded by Richard Master	Governor of Tobago (acting); 1801–1802	Succeeded by Jean Sahuguet Damarzit de Laroche
Preceded by Henry William Bentinck	Lieutenant-Governor of Demerara and Essequibo; February 1812–11 May 1813	Succeeded by John Murray
