= Legislative Assembly (British Guiana) =

The Legislative Assembly was the lower house of the Legislature in British Guiana between 1961 and 1964.

== History ==
A new constitution was promulgated on 18 July 1961, replacing the unicameral Legislative Council with the legislature. The new body consisted of a 13-member Senate and a 36-member Legislative Assembly. Whilst the 13 members of the Senate were nominated, the Legislative Assembly was elected, and consisted of 35 members elected in single-member constituencies, and a Speaker elected by the elected MPs.

Elections to the new Legislature were held on 21 August 1961. The People's Progressive Party (PPP) won 20 seats, the People's National Congress (PNC) won 11 and the United Force four. Both houses convened for the first time on 5 October 1961, when members elected Rahman Baccus Gajraj as Speaker.

Although the PPP had only received 1.6% more of the vote than the PNC, it won almost double the number of seats. This resulted in mass demonstrations led by the PNC, a general strike and severe inter-racial violence. A few weeks after the elections the British authorities intervened by sending in troops and the Governor declared a state of emergency.

Further constitutional amendments in 1964 scrapped the legislature, replacing it with a unicameral House of Assembly elected by proportional representation. The legislature was dissolved on 25 September 1964.

== List of members ==
People's Progressive Party	People's National Congress	The United Force
Cheddi Jagan	Forbes Burnham	Peter d'Aguiar
Brindley Benn	Rudy Kendall	Stephen Campbell
Ram Karran	John Carter	Randolph Emanuel Cheeks
Balram Singh Rai	Eugene Francis Correia	Teddy Melville
Ranji Chandisingh	Neville James Bissember	
Charles Ramkissoon Jacob	William Alexander Blair	
Fenton Harcourt Wilworth Ramsahoye	Rudolph Stanislaus Stanley Hugh	
Earl Maxwell Gladstone Wilson	John Gabriel Joaquin	
George Bowman	Robert James Jordan	
Lawrence Everil McRansford Mann	Claude Alfonso Merriman	
Sheik Mohamed Saffee	Henry Milton Shakespeare Wharton	
George Lakey Robertson		
Moses Bhagwan
John Bernard Caldeira
Victor Downer
Abdul Maccie Hamid
George McLinton Henry
Derek Chunilall Jagan
Goberdhan Harry Lall
Mohamed Shakoor
