= College of Kiezers =

Electoral college in the Guiana colonies

The College of Kiezers was an electoral college in the Dutch colonies of Essequibo and Demerara and their successor, British Guiana.

== History ==
The College of Kiezers (from the Dutch 'kiezers' meaning voters) was established by Laurens Storm van 's Gravesande, Commander of the Dutch colony of Essequibo as an electoral college for Dutch planters to elect members of the Court of Policy and Council of Justice as places became vacant. Sitting together, the Court of Policy and the College of Kiezers formed the Combined Court. The Colleges had an equal number of members from the Dutch West India Company (WIC) and civilians. In 1789 Essequibo and Demerara were merged into a single administration, and joint Colleges were established.

After the British took control of Guiana in 1803, the college came to be seen as the domain of the Dutch colonists. Facing opposition from the body, Lieutenant Governor of Demerara Hugh Lyle Carmichael abolished it in 1812, giving its duties to the Financial Representatives, who were elected by the public, although with a severely limited franchise.

The college was re-established in the 1830s, with its members elected for life by planters. When a vacancy arose in the Court of Policy, the college would nominate two candidates, which the remaining members of the Court of Policy would vote on. However, other parts of the business community objected to the college's monopoly on selecting Court of Policy members. In October 1845 the Reform Association petitioned Queen Victoria to abolish the body and widen the electoral franchise.

The College of Kiezers was abolished for a second time in 1891 when a new constitution allowed for direct elections to the Court of Policy.

== See also ==
- Dutch colonisation of the Guianas
