= Legislative Council (British Guiana) =

The Legislative Council was the legislature of British Guiana between 1928 and 1953 and again from 1954 until 1961.

== History ==
The Legislative Council was created by constitutional reforms in 1928, which abolished the 22-member Combined Court and replaced it with the 30-member Council. The new Council included an extra eight appointees, and consisted of the Governor, two ex-officio members, eight official members, five unofficial members and 14 members elected in single-member constituencies. The new council met for the first time on 28 November 1928. The first elections were held in 1930 and 1935.

Due to the outbreak of World War II, elections did not happen again until 1947, with the Council elected in 1935 becoming known as the "Long Parliament". Constitutional amendments in 1943 saw the number of appointed members reduced from 16 to 11, giving the elected members a majority. The 1947 elections were held under this system.

As a result of the Waddington Commission, further constitutional reforms were enacted in 1952; universal suffrage was introduced and the Legislative Council was to be replaced by a House of Assembly. The term of the final Legislative Council was extended in order to allow preparations for elections under the new system on 27 April 1953. The Council was dissolved on 8 April 1953.

However, the constitution was suspended on 9 October 1953 and the House of Assembly was prorogued, before being dissolved on 21 December. A wholly appointed Interim Legislative Council was established and met for the first time on 5 January 1954. The Interim Legislative Council had 28 members, including the Speaker, three ex-officio members, four members with portfolio, three members without portfolio, two official members and 15 unofficial members, several of whom had previously been elected members.

The Interim Legislative Council remained in place until it was dissolved on 29 June 1957, after which elections for a new Legislative Council were held on 12 August. It consisted of the Speaker, three official members, six nominated members and 14 elected members.

A new constitution was promulgated in July 1961. It abolished the Legislative Council for a second time, replacing it with a bicameral Legislature including a 13-member Senate and a 36-member Legislative Assembly. Elections to the new Legislature were held on 21 August.

== Members ==
=== 1928–30 ===
Position	Member
Unelected members
Governor	Gordon Guggisberg
Colonial Secretary	Crawford Douglas Douglas-Jones
Attorney General	Hector Archibald Josephs
Colonial Treasurer	Thomas Millard
Director of Education	William Bain Gray
Inspector General of Police	William Ernest Horatio Bradburn
Director of Public Works	John Cormack Craig
Conservator of Forests	Bernard Reader Wood
Colonial Transport Department MD	Sydney Howard Bayley
Commissioner of Lands and Mines	John Mullin
Surgeon General	William George Boase
Nominated members	Arthur Piercy Gardiner Austin
Nominated members	Thomas Traill Smellie
Nominated members	Francis Dias
Nominated members	James Smith
Nominated members	Sydney Howard Seymour
Elected members
Berbice (Senior)	Edward Alfred Luckhoo
Berbice (Junior)	Albert Raymond Forbes Webber
Demerara	Arnold Emanuel Seeram
East Demerara	Hubert Chester Humphrys
Georgetown (Senior)	Nelson Cannon
Georgetown (Junior)	Percy Claude Wight
Georgetown (Other)	Joseph Gonsalves
New Amsterdam (Senior)	Eustace Gordon Woolford
New Amsterdam (Junior)	Joseph Eleazar
North West Essequibo (Senior)	Robert Edward Brassington
North West Essequibo (Junior)	Stanley McDonald DeFreitas
South East Essequibo (Senior)	Robert Victor Evan Wong
South East Essequibo (Junior)	Edmund Fitzgerald Fredericks
West Demerara	Alfred Victor Crane
Source: Parliament of Guyana

=== 1930–53 ===
Position	1930–35	1935–47	1947–53
Unelected members
Governor	Edward Brandis Denham	Geoffry Northcote	Charles Campbell Woolley
Colonial Secretary	George Douglas Owen	Eubule John Waddington	Desmond John Parkinson
Attorney General	Hector Archibald Josephs	Hector Archibald Josephs	Edgar Mortimer Duke
Colonial Treasurer	Thomas Millard	Edwin Frank McDavid	Edwin Frank McDavid
Director of Education	William Bain Gray	William Bain Gray	
Director of Agriculture	John Sydney Dash	John Sydney Dash	
Comptroller of Customs	William Albert D'Andrade	William Albert D'Andrade	
Director of Public Works	John Cormack Craig	John Cormack Craig	
Colonial Transport Department MD	Sydney Howard Bayley	–	
Commissioner of Lands and Mines	John Mullin	John Mullin	
Surgeon General	Percy James Kelly	Quirino Bonifacio DeFreitas	
District Commissioner	–	Malcolm Buchanan Laing	
Nominated members	Frederick Jacob Seaford	Thomas Traill Smellie	Frederick Jacob Seaford
Nominated members	Gilherne Joseph De Freitas	Malcolm Burnett Gardiner Austin	George Arthur Cyril Farnum
Nominated members	George Earnest Anderson	Francis Dias	Vincent Roth
Nominated members	Sydney Howard Seymour	Joseph Waterton Jackson	Thomas Theophilus Thompson
Nominated members	Edward Miles Walcott	Edward Miles Walcott	William John Raatgever
Nominated members			Cramat Ally McDoom
Nominated members			Geoffrey Haward Smellie
Elected members
Berbice River	Joseph Eleazar	Joseph Eleazar	Clement Patrick Ferreira
Central Demerara	John Ignatius De Aguiar	John Ignatius De Aguiar	Cheddi Jagan
Demerara-Essequibo	Jung Bahadur Singh	Jung Bahadur Singh	Jung Bahadur Singh
Demerara River	Alfred Victor Crane	Arthur George King	Joseph Patrick Coghlan
Eastern Berbice	Edward Alfred Luckhoo	Edward Alfred Luckhoo	George Mayo Gonsalves
Eastern Demerara	Arnold Emanuel Seeram	Hubert Chester Humphrys	Daniel Prabhudas Debidin
Essequibo River	Edmund Fitzgerald Fredericks	Alfred Railton Crum Ewing	Theophilus Lee
Georgetown Central	Percy Claude Wight	Percy Claude Wight	John Fernandes
Georgetown North	Nelson Cannon	Frederick Jacob Seaford	Jacob Alexander Nicholson
Georgetown South	Joseph Gonsalves	Joseph Gonsalves	Hubert Nathaniel Critchlow
New Amsterdam	Eustace Gordon Woolford	Eustace Gordon Woolford	William Oscar Rudyard Kendall
North Western District	Victorine Antonio Pires	Charles Ramkissoon Jacob	William Phang
Western Berbice	Albert Raymond Forbes Webber	Peer Bacchus	Aaron Theophilus Peters
Western Essequibo	Robert Edward Brassington	Sydney Howard Seymour	Claude Vibart Wight
Source: Parliament of Guyana
