= Charles Woolley (colonial administrator) =

British colonial administrator

Sir Charles Campbell Woolley GBE KCMG MC (15 January 1893 – 20 August 1981) was a British colonial administrator. He was Governor of Cyprus from 1941 to 1946 and Governor of British Guiana from 1947 to 1953.

== Biography ==
The third son of Henry Woolley, Charles Woolley was educated at University College, Cardiff. During the First World War, he served in the South Wales Borderers, held various staff appointments and saw active service in France, Salonika, Constantinople, and the Caucasus. He was mentioned in despatches and received the Military Cross.

Leaving the Army in 1920 with the rank of captain, he joined the Ceylon Civil Service in 1921, serving there until 1935, when he went to Jamaica as Secretary to the Governor and Colonial Secretary. In 1938, he went to Nigeria as Chief Secretary, before being appointed Governor of Cyprus in 1941, holding the post until 1946. From 1947 to 1953, he was Governor of British Guiana.

After retiring in January 1953, Woolley served as president of the International Society for the Protection of Animals (now part of World Animal Protection) from 1969 to 1971 and president of the Southern Counties Orchestral Society.

== Family ==
Woolley married in 1921 Ivy Howells (died 1974), daughter of David Howells, of Cwmbarry, Barry, Glamorgan; they had two sons, Edward and David.
