= Court of Policy =

Coordinates: 6.78239°N 58.50872°W

- Part of the Combined Court
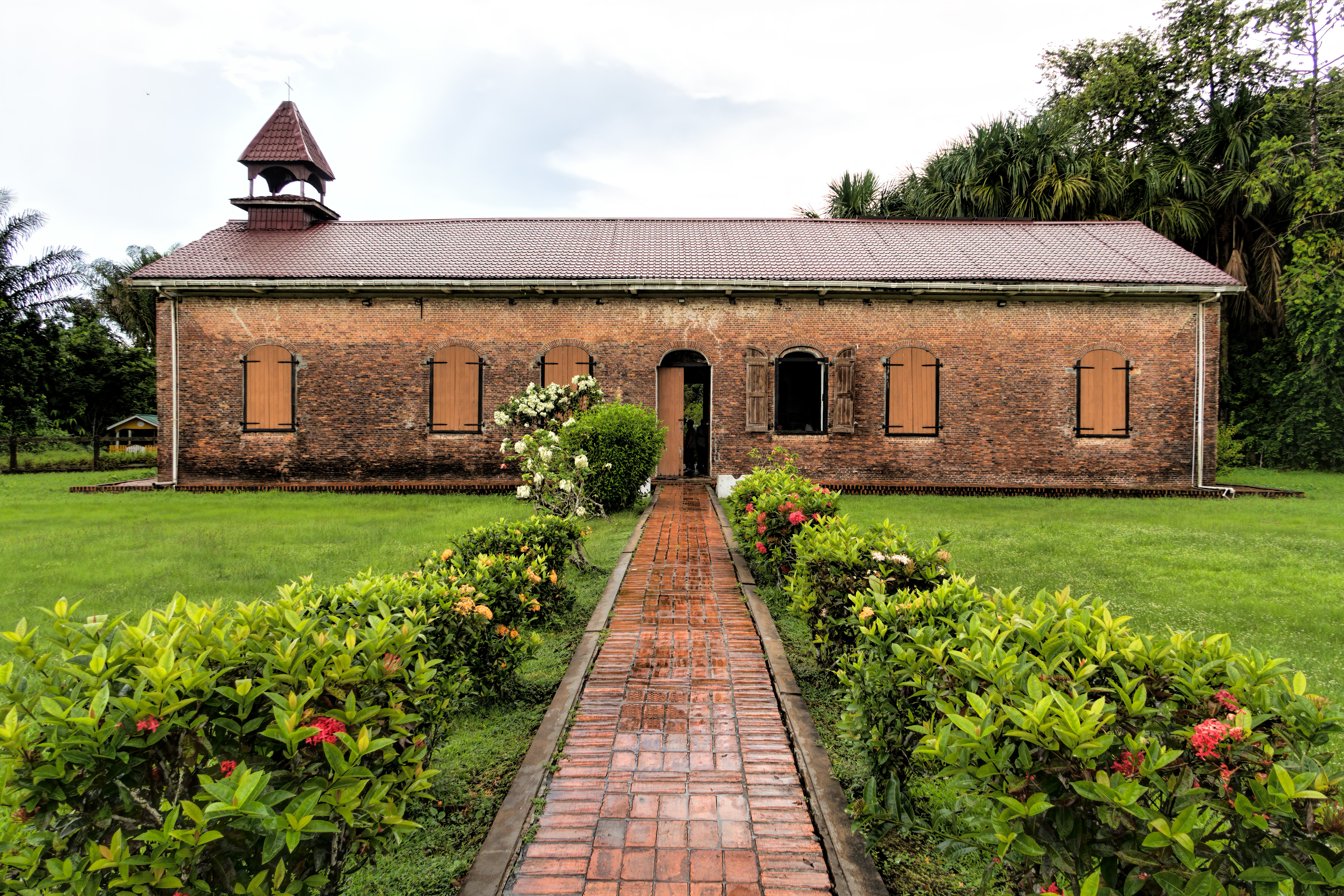
- The Court of Policy building on Fort Island, Essequibo

History
- Founded: 1732
- Disbanded: 1928
- Succeeded by: Legislative Council

Meeting place
- Fort Zeelandia

The Court of Policy was a legislative body in Dutch and British Guiana until 1928. For most of its existence it formed the Combined Court together with the six Financial Representatives.

== History ==
The Court of Policy was established in 1732 by the Dutch authorities, at a time when the colonies of Berbice, Demerara and Essequibo were under the control of the Netherlands. Responsible for legislative and administrative functions, it initially consisted of the Governor, five appointed officials including the Fiscal Officer and the Vendor Master and five colonists chosen by the Governor from a list of nominees submitted by the College of Kiezers. When the British took over the colony in 1803, they continued to use the Dutch administrative bodies including the Court of Policy.

Initially the Court of Policy sitting together with the College of Kiezers formed the Combined Court. However, Lieutenant Governor of Demerara Hugh Lyle Carmichael abolished the College of Kiezers in 1812, giving its duties to the Financial Representatives, who were elected by the public, although with a severely limited franchise. The College of Kiezers was re-established in 1831 solely as an electoral college for the Court of Policy.

Following the 1891 constitutional reforms, the Court of Policy gave up its executive powers, which were transferred to the Executive Council. The reformed Court of Policy had 16 members, half of which were elected. The eight unelected members were the Governor and seven government officials; the Attorney General, the Government Secretary, the Immigration Agent General and the Receiver General, together with three other appointees. The eight elected members were elected from seven constituencies: Demerara East, Demerara West, Essequebo North Western, Essequebo South Eastern, Berbice, City of Georgetown (2 members) and New Amsterdam.

The Colleges of Electors were abolished, and the eight elected members of the Court (and the six Financial Representatives) were elected by the public under a limited franchise. Elections were held under this system in 1892, 1897, 1901, 1906, 1911, 1916, 1921 and 1926. However, the franchise was severely limited; by the 1926 elections only 4.2% of the population were eligible to vote, up from 1.08% in 1921.

The Court of Policy was abolished in 1928 when a new constitution created the Legislative Council; its final meeting was on 17 July 1928.

== Court of Policy building ==
The Court of Policy was built in 1752. It is a one-story clay brick building with 61 cm thick walls. The middle room is the church. The northern room was used by the court, and the southern room was originally intended as prison, but was later designated as a slave auction. The building is the oldest non-military structure in Guyana. On 19 February 2007, the Dutch Heritage Museum opened at the site.

The building, along with the Fort Zeelandia, was added to the UNESCO World Heritage Site Tentative List on 15 November 1995 in the Cultural category. The site has also been designated as a National Monument by the National Trust of Guyana.
