= Combined Court =

Legislature of British Guiana

The Combined Court was the legislature of British Guiana until 1928. In its final form, it consisted of a sitting of the Court of Policy together with the elected Financial Representatives.

== History ==
The Combined Court was established by the Dutch authorities at a time when the colonies of Berbice, Demerara and Essequibo were under the control of the Netherlands. It originally consisted of a joint sitting of the Court of Policy and the College of Kiezers. However, Lieutenant Governor of Demerara Hugh Lyle Carmichael abolished the College of Kiezers in 1812, giving its duties to the Financial Representatives.

The Court of Policy was part-appointed and part-elected by the re-established College of Kiezers, whilst the Financial Representatives were elected by the public, although using a severely limited franchise. Its responsibilities included raising and spending public revenue, and from 1855 onwards, setting the salaries of civil servants.

Following the 1891 constitutional reforms, the Combined Court consisted had 22 members, six of which were the Financial Representatives now elected by the public in the single member constituencies of Demerara, Essequebo North Western, Essequebo South Eastern, Berbice, Georgetown and New Amsterdam, and the remainder were the 16-member Court of Policy, half of which was elected. The Court of Policy included the Governor, seven government officials (the Attorney General, the Government Secretary, the Immigration Agent General and the Receiver General, together with three other appointees). The eight elected members were elected from seven constituencies by the public: Demerara East, Demerara West, Essequebo North Western, Essequebo South Eastern, Berbice, City of Georgetown (2 members) and New Amsterdam. The franchise was severely limited. By the 1926 elections only 4.2% of the population were eligible to vote, up from 1.08% in 1921.

Elections were held under this system in 1892, 1897, 1901, 1906, 1911, 1916, 1921 and 1926. The Combined Court was abolished in 1928 when a new constitution replaced it with the Legislative Council.
