= List of governors of British Guiana =

Governor of British Guiana
- Flag of the governor of British Guiana (1906–1955)
- Longest serving Sir Henry Light; 27 June 1838 – 19 May 1848
- Member of: Court of Policy (until 1928); Legislative Council (from 1928)
- Residence: Government House, Georgetown
- Appointer: British Monarch
- Formation: 21 July 1831
- First holder: Sir Benjamin D'Urban
- Final holder: Sir Richard Edmonds Luyt
- Abolished: 26 May 1966
- Succession: Governor-General of Guyana

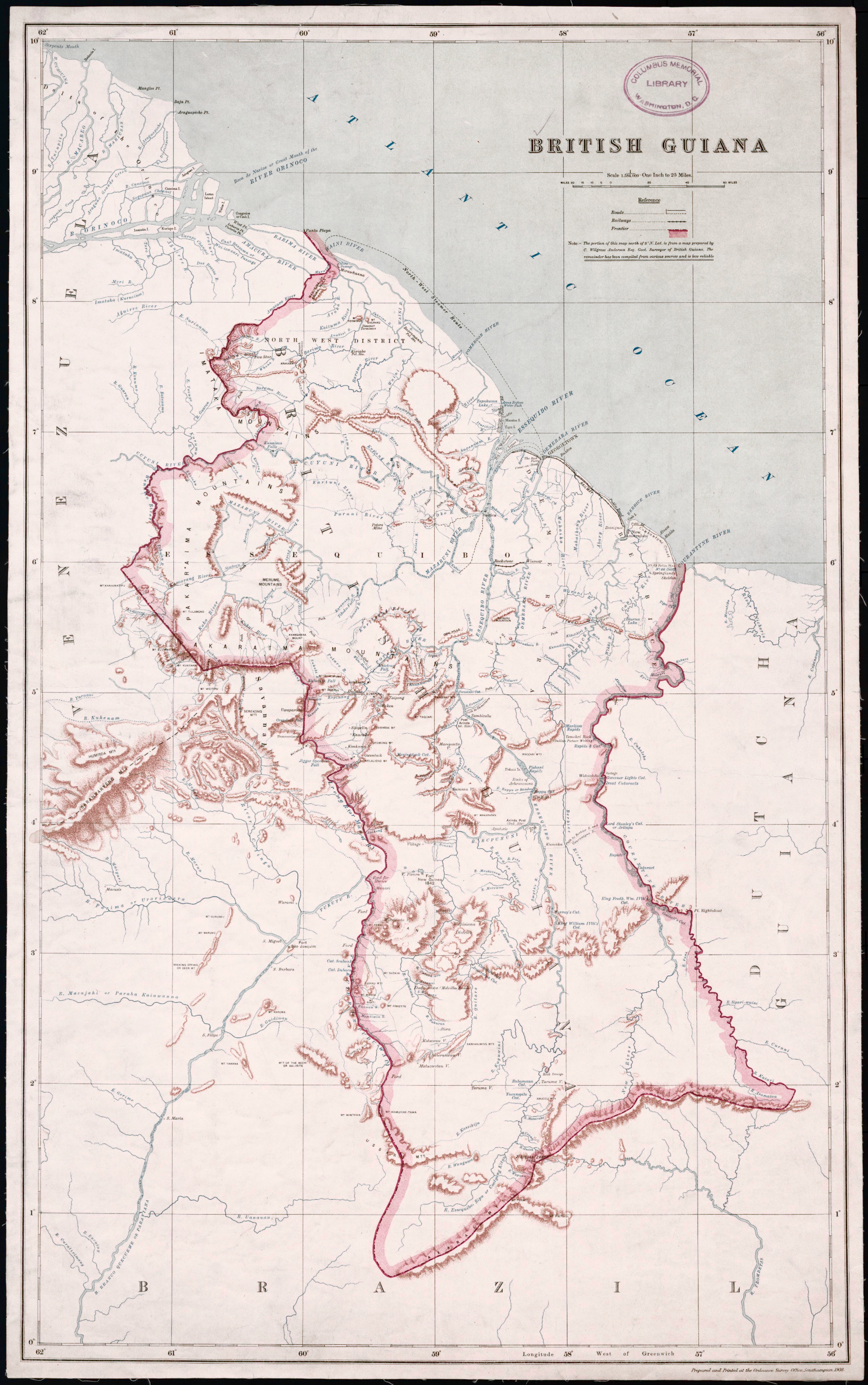
British Guiana map.

The governor of British Guiana was the representative of the Crown in British Guiana. The office existed from 1831 when the colonies of Demerara-Essequibo (see Demerara and Essequibo) and Berbice united as British Guiana until 1966 when Guyana attained independence.

== History ==
Originally the former Dutch colonies of Demerara-Essequibo and Berbice were ceded to the United Kingdom in 1815 with each one being run by a Lieutenant-Governor. In 1831, the British unified the two colonies into British Guiana and appointed Benjamin D'Urban and the first full Governor. Initially the Governor served representing the British Monarch with the Court of Policy, run by the British Guianese plantation owners, acting as the legislature under the pre-existing Dutch made constitution of 1792. In the 1920s, due to disputes between the plantation owners and new bauxite miners and rice farmers, the British introduced a new constitution to formalise British Guiana as a Crown Colony with the Governor holding executive power. The Court of Policy would be replaced by a Legislative Council that gradually gained more elected seats over the decades.

After the 1953 general election, the first held with a fully elected Legislative Council, the Marxist People's Progressive Party won power and passed labour rights bills and pushed for independence. In response, the Governor Alfred Savage dismissed the government, suspended the constitution and appointed his own executive made up of British officials, businessmen and British Guianese conservative politicians. For the next election in 1957, the Legislative Council was reformed by the Governor but with a majority of appointed members. In 1961 a new constitution came into force with the Governor still as acting representative of the Monarch in the colony. The new constitution did not include the power for the Governor to dismiss government ministers or unilaterally dissolve the new House of Assembly, this was rectified by a constitutional amendment in 1964.

== Governors of British Guiana (1831–1966) ==
The following were governors of British Guiana. On 26 May 1966, the colony achieved independence from the United Kingdom as Guyana. After independence, the viceroy in Guyana was the Governor-General of Guyana.

Tenure	Portrait	Incumbent	Notes
21 July 1831 – 26 June 1833		Sir Benjamin D'Urban	
26 June 1833 – 27 June 1838		Sir James Carmichael-Smyth	
27 June 1838 – 19 May 1848		Sir Henry Light	
19 May 1848 – 12 February 1849		William Walker	Acting, first time
12 February 1849 – 11 May 1853		Henry Barkly	
11 May 1853 – 23 May 1854		William Walker	Acting, second time
23 May 1854 – 7 January 1862		Sir Philip Wodehouse	
7 January 1862 – 25 January 1869		Sir Francis Hincks	
25 January 1869 – 26 December 1873		Sir John Scott	
27 December 1873 – 10 March 1874		Edward Rushworth	Acting
10 March 1874 – 8 March 1877		James Robert Longden	
8 March 1877 – 3 April 1877		William A. G. Young	Acting, first time
3 April 1877 – 13 December 1881		Sir Cornelius Hendricksen Kortright	
13 December 1881 – 4 May 1882		William A. G. Young	Acting, second time
4 May 1882 – 1887		Sir Henry Turner Irving	
26 April 1884 – 1884		Sir William Haynes-Smith	Acting for Irving
1887–1888		Charles Bruce	Acting
1888 – 23 March 1893		Jenico Preston, 14th Viscount Gormanston	
April 1891 – 15 October 1891		Sir Charles Bruce	Acting for Viscount Gormanston, second time
23 March 1893 – 5 July 1893		Sir Charles Bruce	Acting, third time
5 July 1893 – September 1895		Sir Charles Cameron Lees	
15 December 1894 – 29 January 1895		Charles Cavendish Boyle	Acting for Lees, first time
September 1895 – March 1896		Charles Cavendish Boyle	Acting, second time
March 1896 – 27 March 1898		Sir Augustus William Lawson Hemming	
1 October 1896 – 18 November 1896		Charles Cavendish Boyle	Acting for Hemming, third time
27 May 1897 – 28 July 1897		Charles Cavendish Boyle	Acting for Hemming, fourth time
27 March 1898 – 3 July 1901		Sir Walter Joseph Sendall	
3 July 1901 – 26 September 1904		Sir James Alexander Swettenham	
26 September 1904 – 5 July 1912		Sir Frederick Mitchell Hodgson	
5 July 1912 – 15 April 1917		Sir Walter Egerton	
15 April 1917 – 4 April 1923		Sir Wilfred Collet	
4 April 1923 – 31 August 1925		Sir Graeme Thomson	
31 August 1925 – 7 November 1928		Sir Cecil Hunter-Rodwell	
7 November 1928 – 9 June 1930		Sir Frederick Gordon Guggisberg	
9 June 1930 – 26 March 1935		Sir Edward Brandis Denham	
26 March 1935 – 19 November 1937		Sir Geoffry Alexander Stafford Northcote	Acting from 1936
19 November 1937 – 7 November 1941		Sir Wilfrid Edward Francis Jackson	
7 November 1941 – 1947		Sir Gordon James Lethem	Acting from 1946
12 April 1947 – 14 April 1953		Sir Charles Campbell Woolley	
14 April 1953 – 25 October 1955		Sir Alfred William Lungley Savage	
25 October 1955 – 22 December 1958		Sir Patrick Muir Renison	
22 December 1958 – 7 March 1964		Sir Ralph Francis Alnwick Grey	
7 March 1964 – 26 May 1966		Sir Richard Edmonds Luyt	

== Flags ==
Flag of the governor of British Guiana (1875–1906)

Flag of the governor of British Guiana (1906–1955)

Flag of the governor of British Guiana (1955–1966)

== See also ==
- President of Guyana
- List of heads of state of Guyana
- List of prime ministers of Guyana
