= British Guiana =

British colony from 1814 to 1966

Coordinates: 5°0′0″N 58°45′0″W

- 1831–1966
- Flag Coat of arms
- Motto: Damus petimusque vicissim (Latin) "We give and take in return"
- Anthem: God Save the King (1831–1837; 1901–1952); God Save the Queen (1837–1901; 1952–1966)
- Status: British colony
- Capital: Georgetown
- Common languages: Official; English; Vernacular language Guyanese Creole Native languages: Akawaio; Macushi; Waiwai; Arawakan family; Patamona; Warrau; Kalina; Wapishana; Arekuna; Other languages: Guyanese Hindustani; Languages of South Asia; African languages; Portuguese; Dutch; Spanish; French; Chinese; Tamil; Skepi Creole Dutch; Berbice Creole Dutch
- Monarch
  - 1831–1837: William IV
  - 1837–1901: Victoria
  - 1901–1910: Edward VII
  - 1910–1936: George V
  - 1936: Edward VIII
  - 1936–1952: George VI
  - 1952–1966: Elizabeth II
- Legislature: Legislative Council
- Historical era: New Imperialism
  - Single colony: 21 July 1831
  - New constitution: 1928
  - Independence: 26 May 1966

Area
- 1924: 231,800 km^{2} (89,500 sq mi)

Population
  - 1924: 307,391
- Currency: Spanish dollar (to 1876); British Guiana dollar (to 1940s); British West Indies dollar (1949–65); East Caribbean dollar (1965–66)
Preceded by
Demerara-Essequibo
Berbice
Gran Colombia
Succeeded by
Guyana
- Today part of: Guyana

British Guiana was a British colony located on the northern coast of South America. Since 1966 it has been known as the independent nation of Guyana.

The first known Europeans to encounter Guiana were Sir Walter Raleigh, an English explorer, and his crew. Raleigh published a book entitled The Discovery of Guiana, but this mainly relates to the Guayana region of Venezuela.

The Dutch were the first Europeans to settle there, starting in the early 17th century. They founded the colonies of Essequibo and Berbice, adding Demerara in the mid-18th century. In 1796, Great Britain took over these three colonies during hostilities with the French, who had occupied the Netherlands. Britain returned control of the territory to the Batavian Republic in 1802, but captured the colonies a year later during the Napoleonic Wars. The Netherlands officially ceded the colonies to the United Kingdom in 1815.

The British consolidated the territories into a single colony in 1831. The colony's capital was at Georgetown (known as Stabroek prior to 1812). Since the late 19th century, the economy has become more diversified but has still relied on resource exploitation. Guyana became independent of the United Kingdom on 26 May 1966.

== Establishment ==
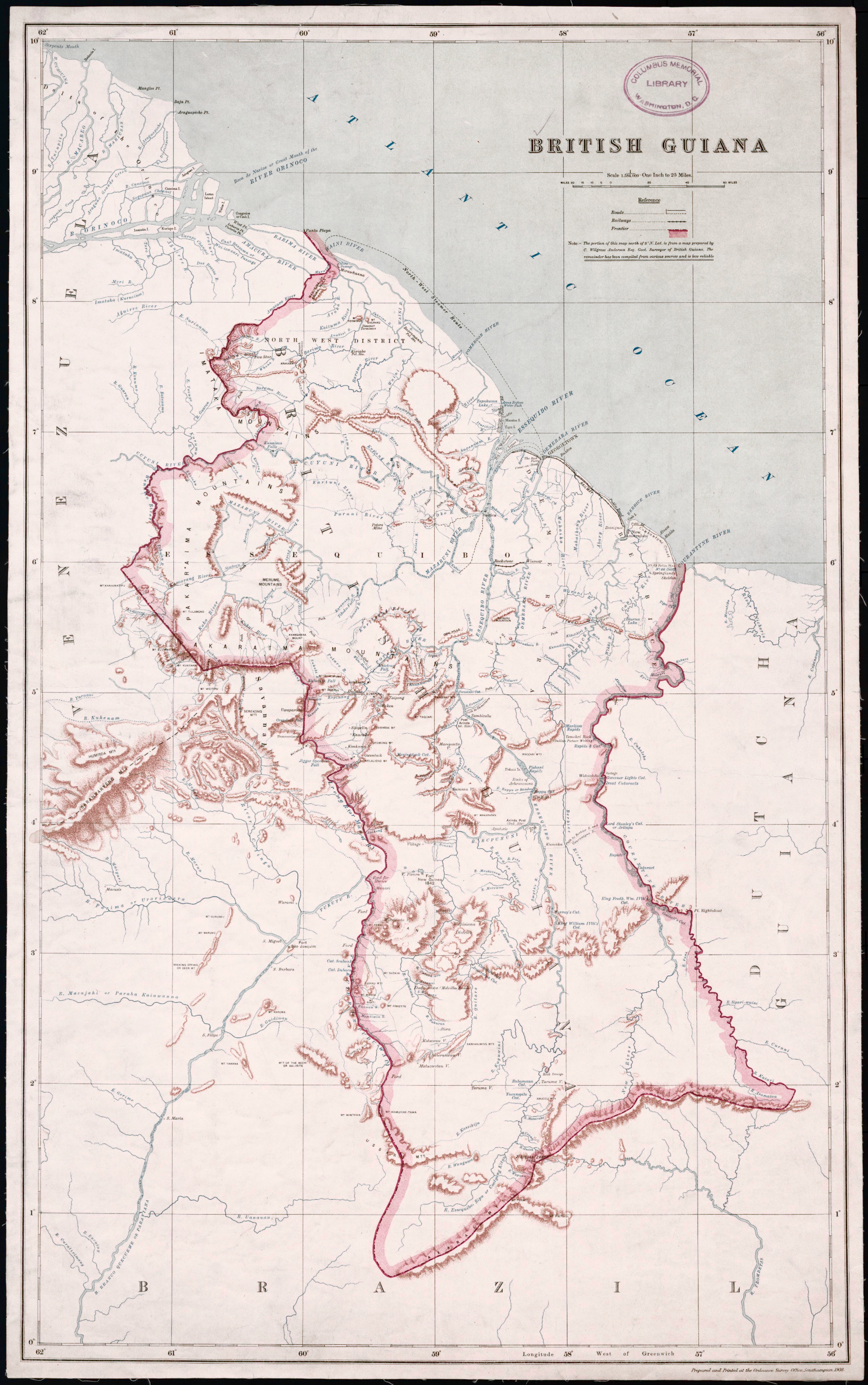
Map of British Guiana in 1908

The English made at least two unsuccessful attempts in the 17th century to colonise the lands that would later be known as British Guiana. By that time, the Dutch had established two colonies in the area: Essequibo, administered by the Dutch West India Company (WIC), and Berbice, administered by the Berbice Association. The WIC founded a third colony, Demerara, in the mid-18th century.

During the French Revolutionary Wars of the late 18th century, when the Netherlands were occupied by the French, and Great Britain and France were at war, Britain took over the colony in 1796. A British expeditionary force was dispatched from its colony of Barbados to seize the colonies from the French-dominated Batavian Republic. The colonies surrendered without a struggle. Initially very little changed, as the British agreed to allow the long-established laws of the colonies to remain in force.

In 1802 Britain returned the colonies to the Batavian Republic under the terms of the Treaty of Amiens. But, after resuming hostilities with France in the Napoleonic Wars in 1803, Britain seized the colonies again less than a year later. The Netherlands officially ceded the three colonies to the United Kingdom in the Anglo-Dutch Treaty of 1814.

The UK continued separate administration of the individual colonies until 1822, when the administration of Essequibo and Demerara was combined. In 1831, the administration Essequibo-Demerara and Berbice was combined, and the united colony became known as British Guiana. During World War II the United States Navy established NAF British Guiana and NAF Paramaribo in British Guiana.

== Economy and politics ==
The economy was based on cultivation and processing of sugarcane as a commodity crop, dependent on extensive labour by enslaved workers of mostly sub-Saharan African descent. Although the UK and the United States abolished the Atlantic slave trade in 1807, the domestic slave trade flourished until Britain emancipated all the enslaved in its colonies in the 1830s. The wealth they generated had largely flowed to a group of absentee slave owners living in Britain, especially in Glasgow and Liverpool.

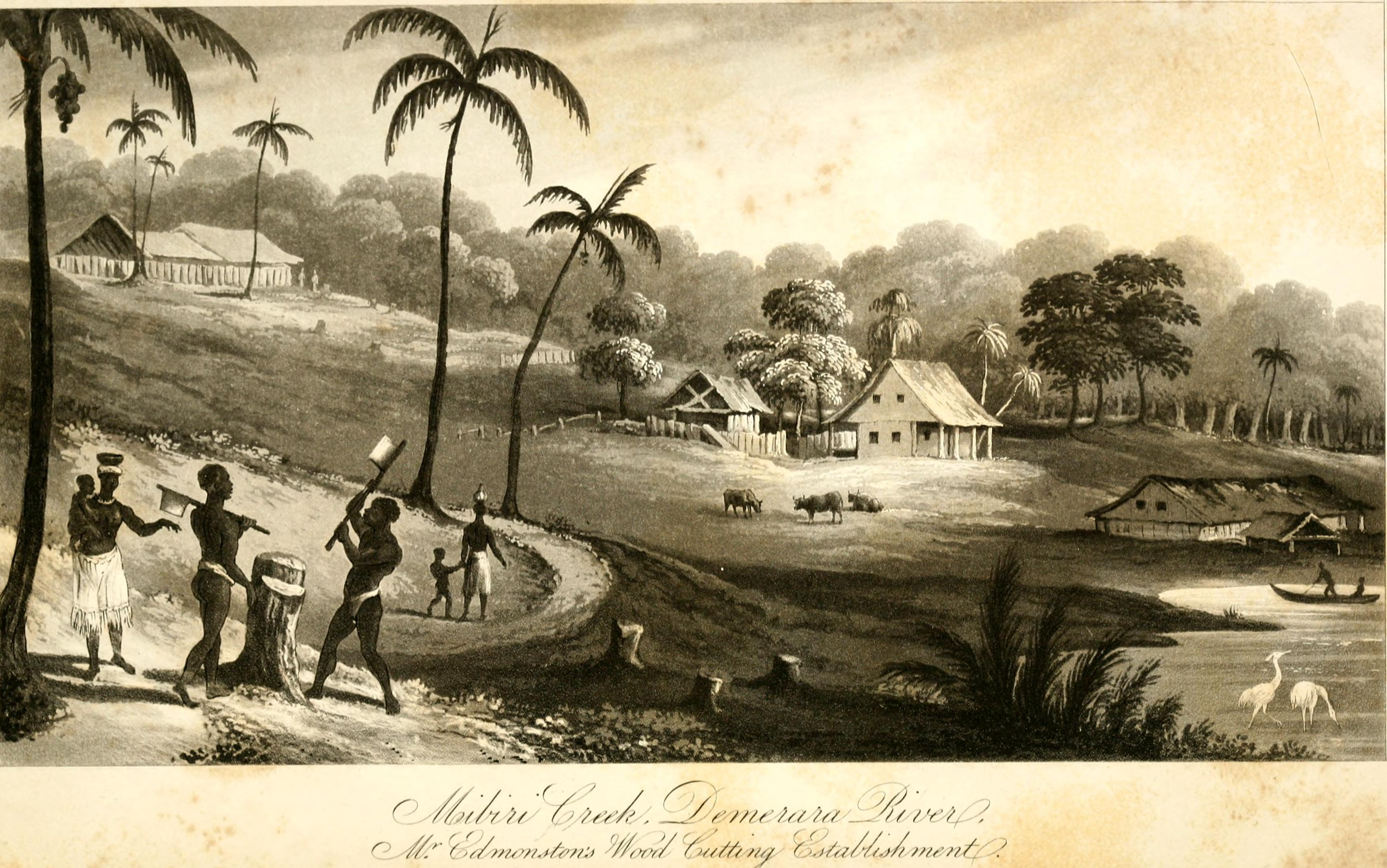
Charles Edmonstone plantation in Demerara, 1834.

The economy of British Guiana was completely based on sugarcane production until the 1880s, when falling cane sugar prices stimulated a shift toward rice farming, mining and forestry. But the production of sugarcane remained a significant part of the economy (in 1959 sugar still accounted for nearly 50% of exports). Under the Dutch, settlement and economic activity was concentrated around sugarcane plantations lying inland from the coast.

Under the British, cane planting expanded to richer coastal lands, with greater coastline protection. Until the abolition of slavery in the British Empire, sugar planters depended almost exclusively on slave labour to produce sugar. Georgetown was the site of a significant slave rebellion in 1823.

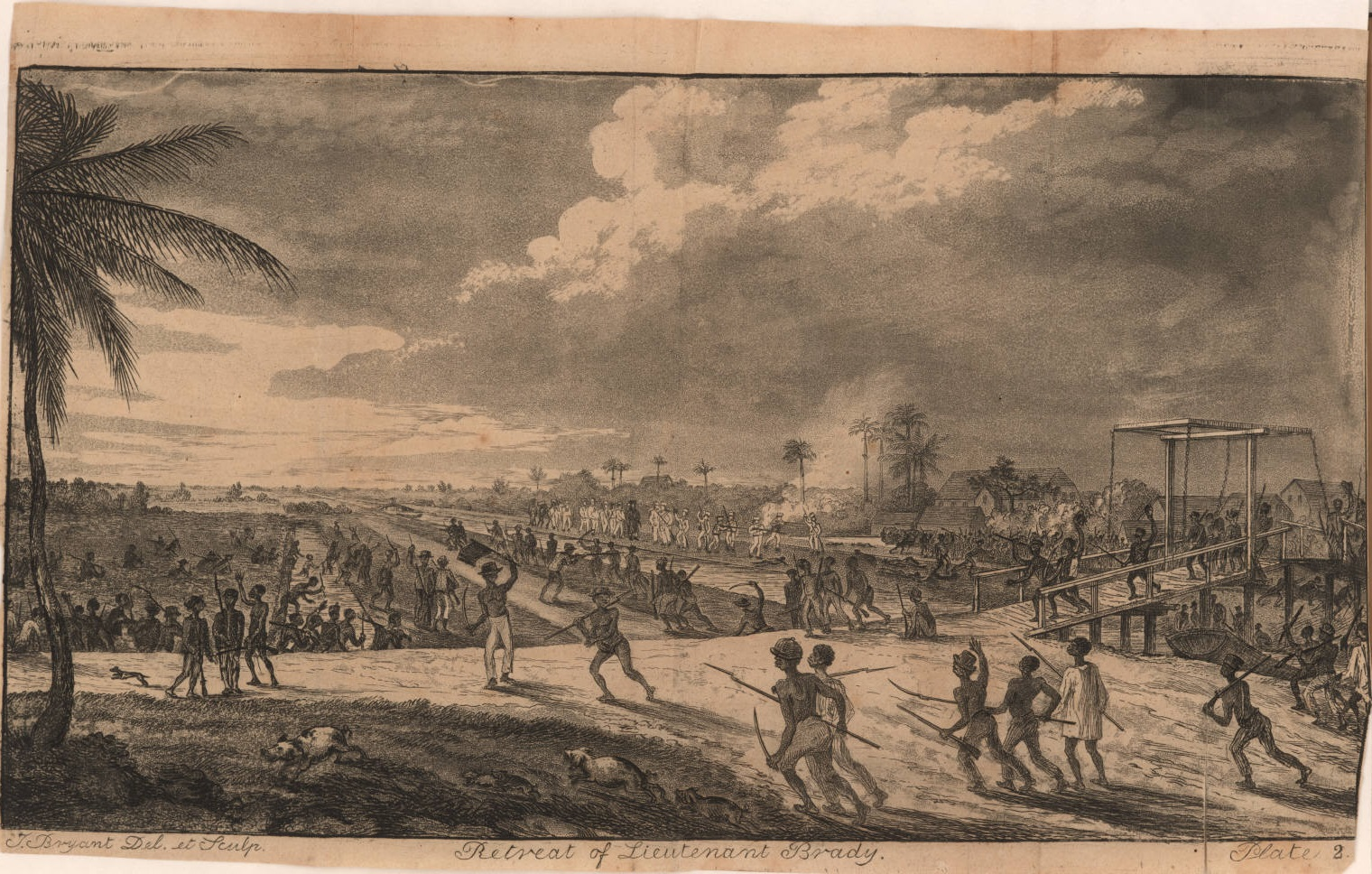
Illustration of the Demerara rebellion of 1823

In the 1880s gold and diamond deposits were discovered in British Guiana, including what was thought to be the world's largest diamond in 1922. They did not generate significant revenue.

Bauxite deposits proved more promising and would remain an important part of the economy. The colony did not develop any significant manufacturing industry, other than sugar factories, rice mills, sawmills, and certain small-scale industries (including a brewery, a soap factory, a biscuit factory, and an oxygen-acetylene plant, among others).

The London-based Booker Group of companies (Booker Brothers, McConnell & Co., Ltd) dominated the economy of British Guiana. The Bookers had owned sugar plantations in the colony since the early 19th century; by the end of the century they owned a majority of them. By 1950 they owned all but three. With the increasing success and wealth of the Booker Group, they expanded internationally and diversified by investing in rum, pharmaceuticals, publishing, advertising, retail stores, timber, and petroleum, among other industries. The Booker Group became the largest employer in the colony, leading some to refer to it as "Booker's Guiana".

Indentured workers were recruited from India from 1850 to 1920, and were largely locked in place. A minority achieved mobility. Some secretly fled; others waited until their contracts expired. Indian migration within the colonies involved three phases: desertion from the plantations; movement settlements and later to urban areas; and intra-regional migration from one Caribbean island to another. The traditional rigid Indian caste system largely collapsed in the colonies.

Guianese served in all British forces during the Second World War, and enjoyed veterans' benefits afterwards. The colony made a small but important financial contribution to the war effort. It also served as a refuge for Jews displaced from continental Europe, where the Nazis and Fascists worked to destroy them in the Holocaust.

== Railways ==
British colonists built the first railway system in British Guiana: 98 km (61 mi) of 1,435 mm (4 ft 8 1/2 in) standard gauge, from Georgetown to Rosignol, and 31 km (19 mi) of 1,067 mm (3 ft 6 in) line between Vreed en Hoop and Parika; it opened in 1848. Several narrow-gauge lines were built to serve the sugar industry and others were built to serve the later bauxite and other mines.

In 1948, when the railway in Bermuda was closed down, the locomotives, rolling stock, track, sleepers and virtually all the associated paraphernalia of a railway were shipped to British Guiana to renovate the aged system.

The lines ceased to operate in 1972. The large Central Station is still standing in Georgetown. Some of the inland mines still operate narrow-gauge lines.

== Administration ==
The British long continued the forms of Dutch colonial government in British Guiana. A Court of Policy exercised both legislative and executive functions under the direction of the colonial Governor (which existed from 1831 to 1966). A group known as the Financial Representatives sat with the Court of Policy in a Combined Court to set tax policies. A majority of the members of the Courts was appointed by the Governor; the rest were selected by a College of Kiezers (Dutch for 'Voters', i.e. 'Electoral College'). The Kiezers were elected, with the restrictive franchise based on property holdings and limited to the larger landowners of the colony. They held this office for life, or during residence of the colony. The Courts were dominated in the early centuries by the sugar planters and their representatives.

In 1891 the College of Kiezers was abolished in favour of direct election of the elective membership of the Courts. Membership of the Court of Policy became half elected and half appointed, and all of the Financial Representatives became elective positions. The executive functions of the Court of Policy were transferred to a new Executive Council under the control of the Governor. Property qualifications were significantly relaxed for voters and for candidates to the Courts.

In 1928 the British Government abolished the Dutch-influenced constitution and replaced it with a Crown colony constitution. A Legislative Council with an appointed majority was established, and the administrative powers of the Governor were strengthened. These constitutional changes were not popular among the Guyanese, who viewed them as a step backward. The franchise was extended to women.

In 1938 the West India Royal Commission ("The Moyne Commission") was appointed to investigate the economic and social condition of all the British colonies in the Caribbean region after a number of civil and labour disturbances. Among other changes, the Commission recommended some constitutional reforms. As a result, in 1943 a majority of the Legislative Council seats became elective, the property qualifications for voters and for candidates for the Council were lowered, and the bar on women and clergy serving on the Council was abolished. The Governor retained control of the Executive Council, which had the power to veto or pass laws against the wishes of the Legislative Council.

The next round of constitutional reforms came in 1953. A bicameral legislature, consisting of a lower House of Assembly and an upper State Council, was established. The voting membership of the House of Assembly was entirely elective. The membership of the State Council was appointed by the Governor and the House of Assembly and possessed limited revisionary powers. A Court of Policy became the executive body, consisting of the Governor and other colonial officials. Universal adult suffrage was instituted, and the property qualifications for office abolished.

The election of 27 April 1953 under the new system provoked a serious constitutional crisis. The People's Progressive Party (PPP) won 18 of the 24 seats in the House of Assembly. This result alarmed the British Government, which was surprised by the strong showing of the PPP. It considered the PPP as too friendly with communist organisations.

As a result of its fears of communist influence in the colony, the British Government suspended the constitution, declared a state of emergency, and militarily occupied British Guiana on 9 October 1953. Under the direction of the British Colonial Office, the Governor assumed direct rule of the colony under an Interim Government, which continued until 1957. On 12 August 1957, elections were held and the PPP won nine of fourteen elective seats in a new legislature.

A constitutional convention convened in London in March 1960 reached agreement on another new legislature, to consist of an elected House of Assembly (35 seats) and a nominated Senate (13 seats). In the ensuing election of 21 August 1961, the PPP won 20 seats in the House of Assembly, entitling it as the majority party to appoint eight senators. Upon the 1961 election, British Guiana also became self-governing, except as to defence and external matters. The leader of the majority party became prime minister, who then named a Council of Ministers, replacing the former Executive Council.

From 1962 to 1964, riots, strikes and other disturbances stemming from racial, social and economic conflicts delayed full independence for British Guiana. The leaders of the political parties reported to the British Colonial Secretary that they were unable to reach agreement on the remaining details of forming an independent government. The British Colonial Office intervened by imposing its own independence plan, in part requiring another election under a new proportional representation system. Britain expected that this system would reduce the number of seats won by the PPP and prevent it from obtaining a majority.

The December 1964 elections for the new legislature gave the PPP 45.8% (24 seats), the People's National Congress (PNC) 40.5% (22 seats) and the United Force (UF) 12.4% (7 seats). The UF agreed to form a coalition government with the PNC, and accordingly, the PNC leader became the new prime minister. In November 1965 an independence conference in London quickly reached agreement on an independent constitution; it set the date for independence as 26 May 1966. On that date, at 12 midnight, British Guiana became the new nation of Guyana.

== Territorial disputes ==
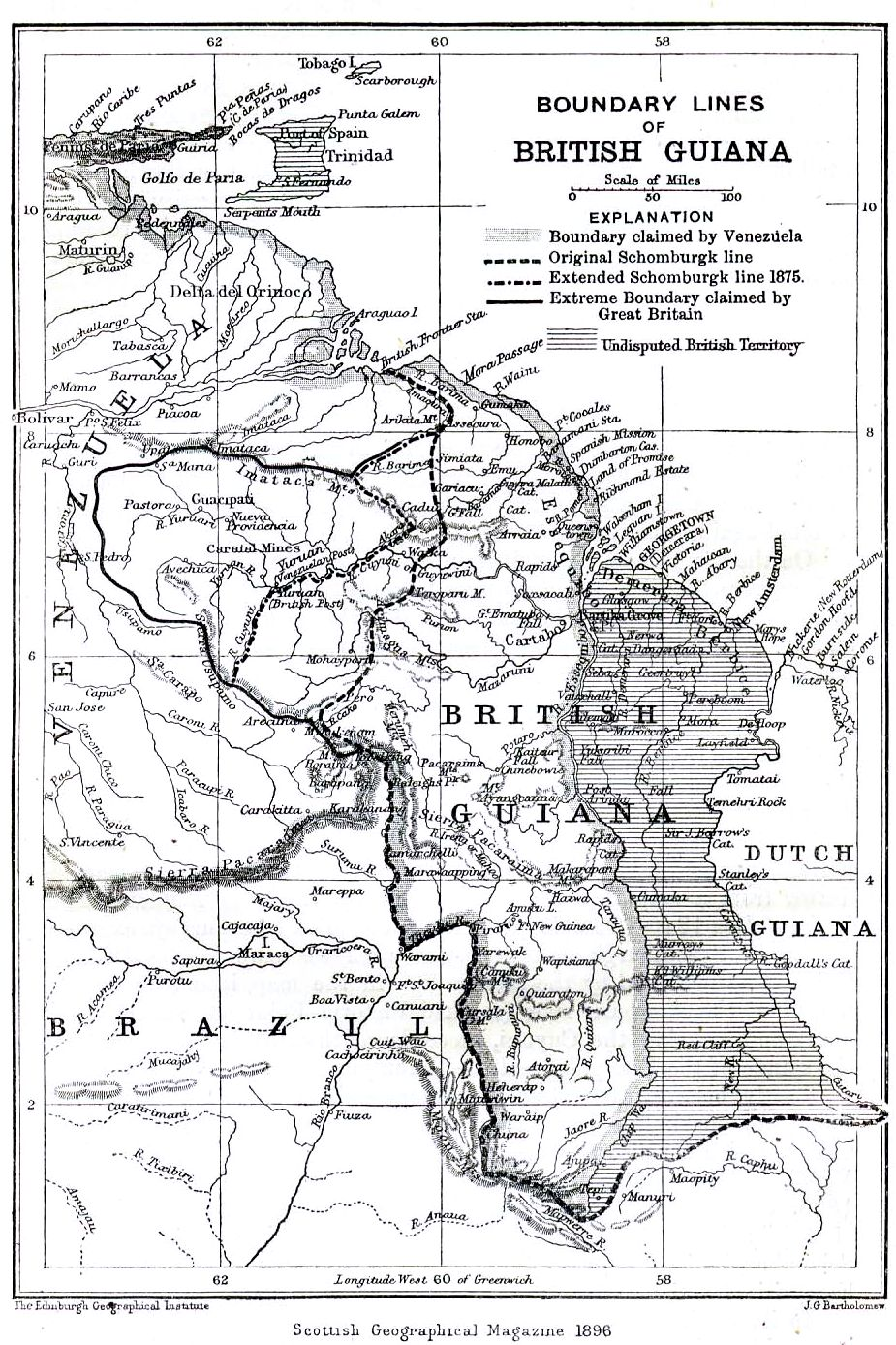
British Guiana and its boundary lines, 1896

=== Western boundary with Venezuela ===
In 1840, the British Government assigned the German-born explorer Robert Hermann Schomburgk to survey and mark out the western boundary of British Guiana with newly independent Venezuela. Venezuela did not accept the Schomburgk Line, which placed the entire Cuyuni River basin within the colony. Venezuela claimed all lands west of the Essequibo River as its territory (see map in this section).

The dispute continued on and off for half a century, culminating in the Venezuela Crisis of 1895, in which Venezuela sought to use the United States' Monroe Doctrine to win support for its position. US President Grover Cleveland used diplomatic pressure to get the British to agree to arbitration of the issue, ultimately agreeing terms for the arbitration that suited Britain. An arbitration tribunal convened in Paris in 1898, and issued its award in 1899. The tribunal awarded about 94% of the disputed territory to British Guiana. A commission surveyed a new border according to the award, and the parties accepted the boundary in 1905.

There the matter rested until 1962, when Venezuela renewed its 19th-century claim, alleging that the arbitral award was invalid. After his death, Severo Mallet-Prevost, legal counsel for Venezuela and a named partner in the New York law firm Curtis, Mallet-Prevost, Colt & Mosle published a letter alleging that the judges on the tribunal acted improperly as a result of a back-room deal between Russia and the United Kingdom. The British Government rejected this claim, asserting the validity of the 1899 award. The British Guiana Government, then under the leadership of the PPP, also strongly rejected this claim. Efforts by all parties to resolve the matter on the eve of Guyana's independence in 1966 failed; as of today, the dispute remains unresolved.

=== Eastern boundary with Suriname ===
Robert Schomburgk's 1840 commission also included a survey of the colony's eastern boundary with the Dutch colony of Surinam, now the independent nation of Suriname. The 1899 arbitration award settling the British Guiana–Venezuela border made reference to the border with Suriname as continuing to the source of the Courantyne River, which it named as the Kutari River. The Netherlands raised a diplomatic protest, claiming that the New River, and not the Kutari, was to be regarded as the source of the Courantyne and the boundary. The British government in 1900 replied that the issue was already settled by the longstanding acceptance of the Kutari as the boundary.

In 1962, the Kingdom of the Netherlands, on behalf of its then-constituent country of Suriname, finally made formal claim to the "New River Triangle", the triangular-shaped region between the New and Kutari rivers that was in dispute. The then Surinamese colonial government and, after 1975, the independent Surinamese government, maintained the Dutch position, while the British Guiana Government, and later the independent Guyanese government, maintained the British position.

== Stamps and postal history of British Guiana ==
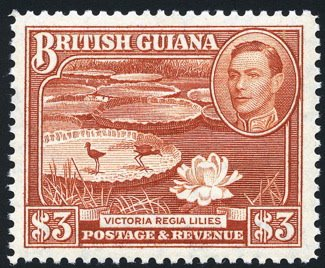
Stamp with a portrait of King George VI, 1938

British Guiana is famous among philatelists for its early postage stamps, which were first issued in 1850. These stamps include some of the rarest, most expensive stamps in the world, such as the unique British Guiana 1c magenta from 1856, which was sold in 2014 for US$9.5 million.

== See also ==
- Economy of Guyana
- Geography of Guyana
- Guyanese British
- History of Guyana
- List of governors of British Guiana
- Politics of Guyana
- Robert Hermann Schomburgk
- Charles Waterton
- Dutch colonisation of the Guianas

British Guiana travel guide from Wikivoyage
