= Outline of Guyana =

Country in South America

The Flag of Guyana

The Coat of arms of Guyana

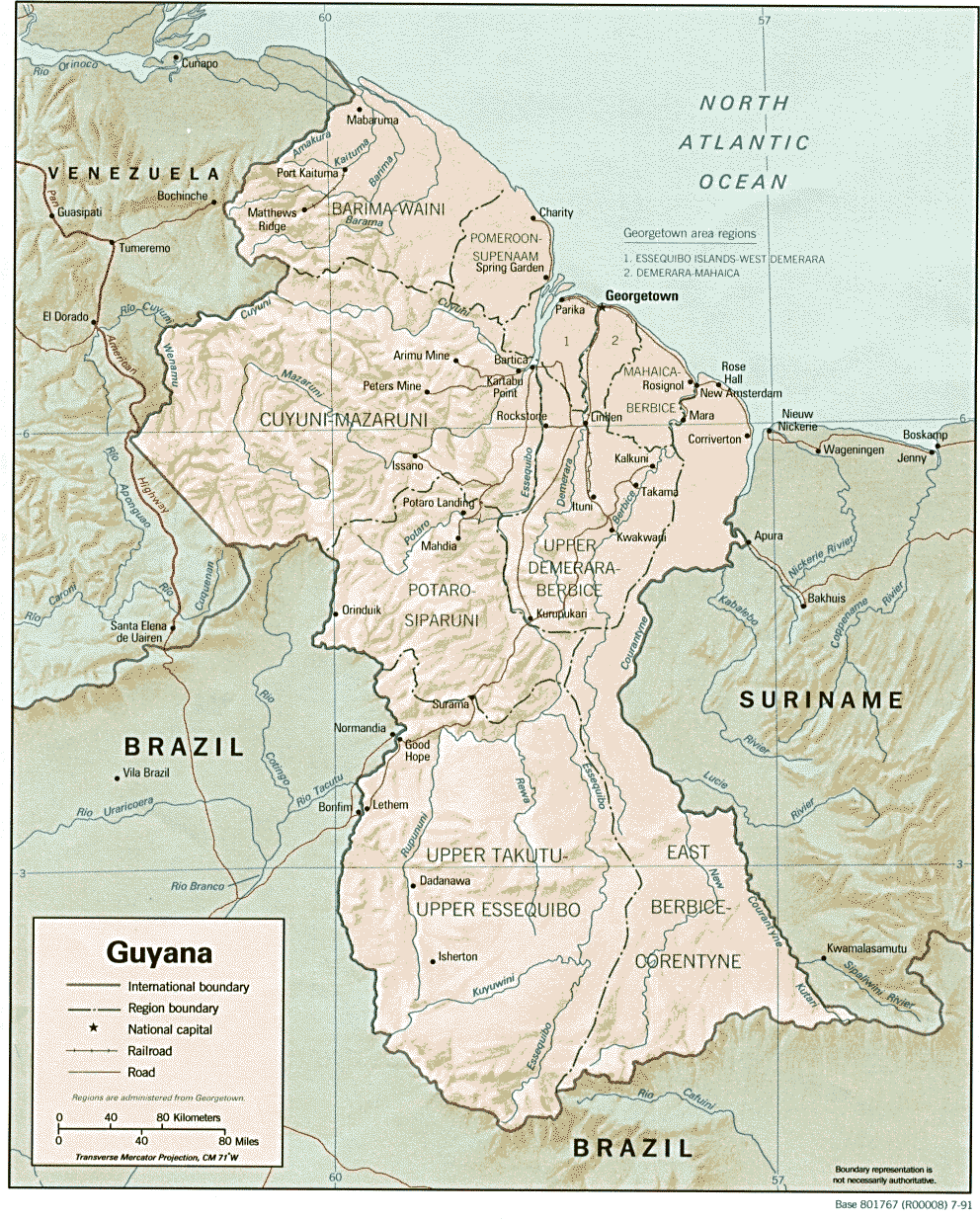
An enlargeable relief map of the Co-operative Republic of Guyana

The following outline is provided as an overview of and topical guide to Guyana:

Guyana – previously known as British Guiana, is the only nation state of the Commonwealth of Nations on the mainland of South America. Bordered to the east by Suriname, to the south and southwest by Brazil and to the west by Venezuela, it is the third-smallest country on the mainland of South America. It is one of four non-Spanish-speaking territories on the continent, along with the countries of Brazil (Portuguese), Suriname (Dutch) and the French overseas region of French Guiana (French).

== General reference ==
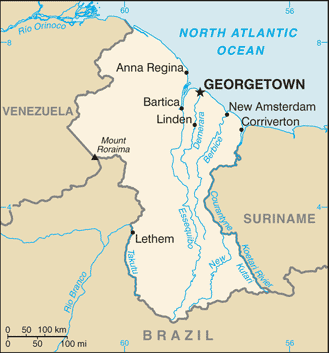
An enlargeable basic map of Guyana

- Pronunciation: /ɡaɪˈænə/ or /ɡiːˈɑːnə/
- Common English country name: Guyana
- Official English country name: The Co-operative Republic of Guyana
- Common endonym(s): Guyana
- Official endonym(s): The Co-operative Republic of Guyana
- Adjectival(s): Guyanese (disambiguation)
- Demonym(s):
- Etymology : Name of Guyana
- ISO country codes: GY, GUY, 328
- ISO region codes: See ISO 3166-2:GY
- Internet country code top-level domain: .gy

== Geography of Guyana ==
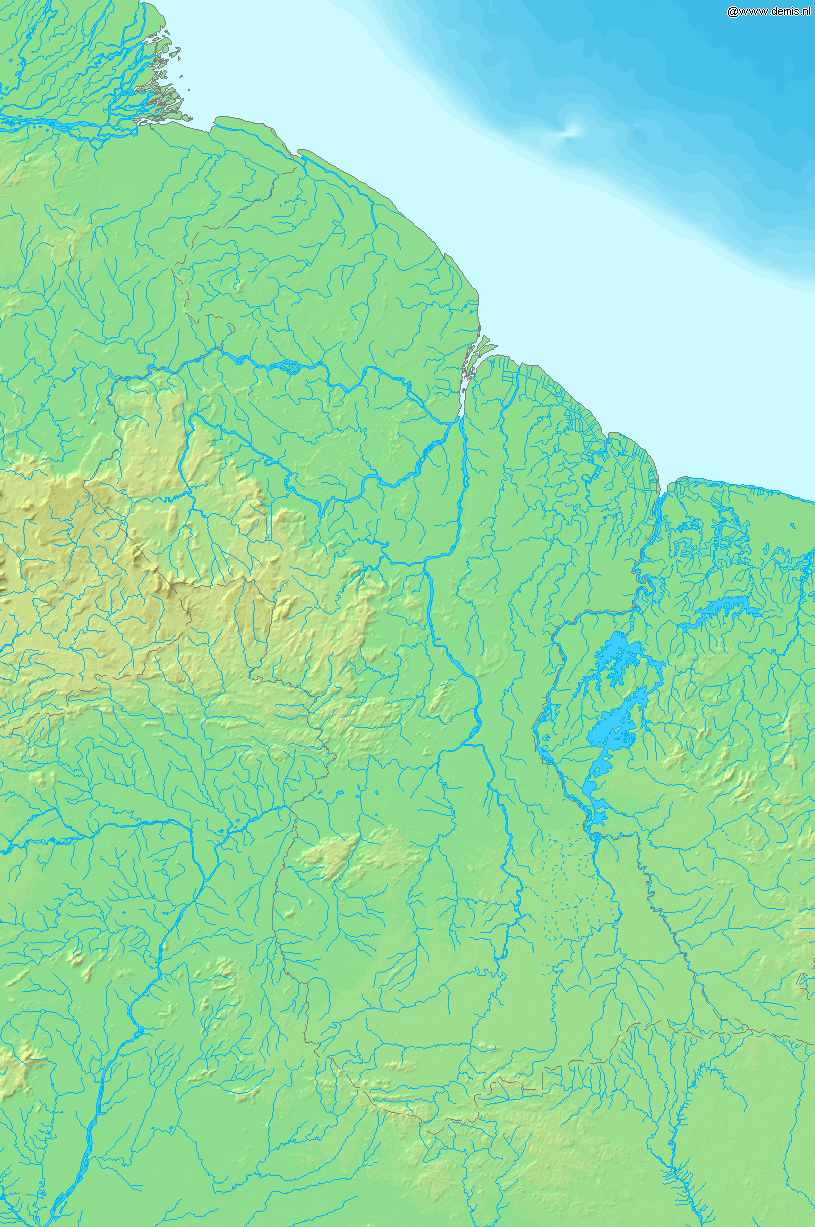
An enlargeable topographic map of Guyana

Geography of Guyana

- Guyana is: a country
- Location:
  - Northern Hemisphere
  - Western Hemisphere
    - South America
  - Time zone: UTC-04
  - Extreme points of Guyana
    - High: Mount Roraima 2,750 m (9,022 ft)
    - Low: North Atlantic Ocean 0 m
  - Land boundaries: 2,949 km

Brazil 1,606 km
Venezuela 743 km
Suriname 600 km

- Coastline: North Atlantic Ocean 459 km

- Population of Guyana: 744,962 (Jul. 2018 estimate) - 161th most populous country
- Area of Guyana: 214,999 km^{2}
- Atlas of Guyana

=== Environment of Guyana ===
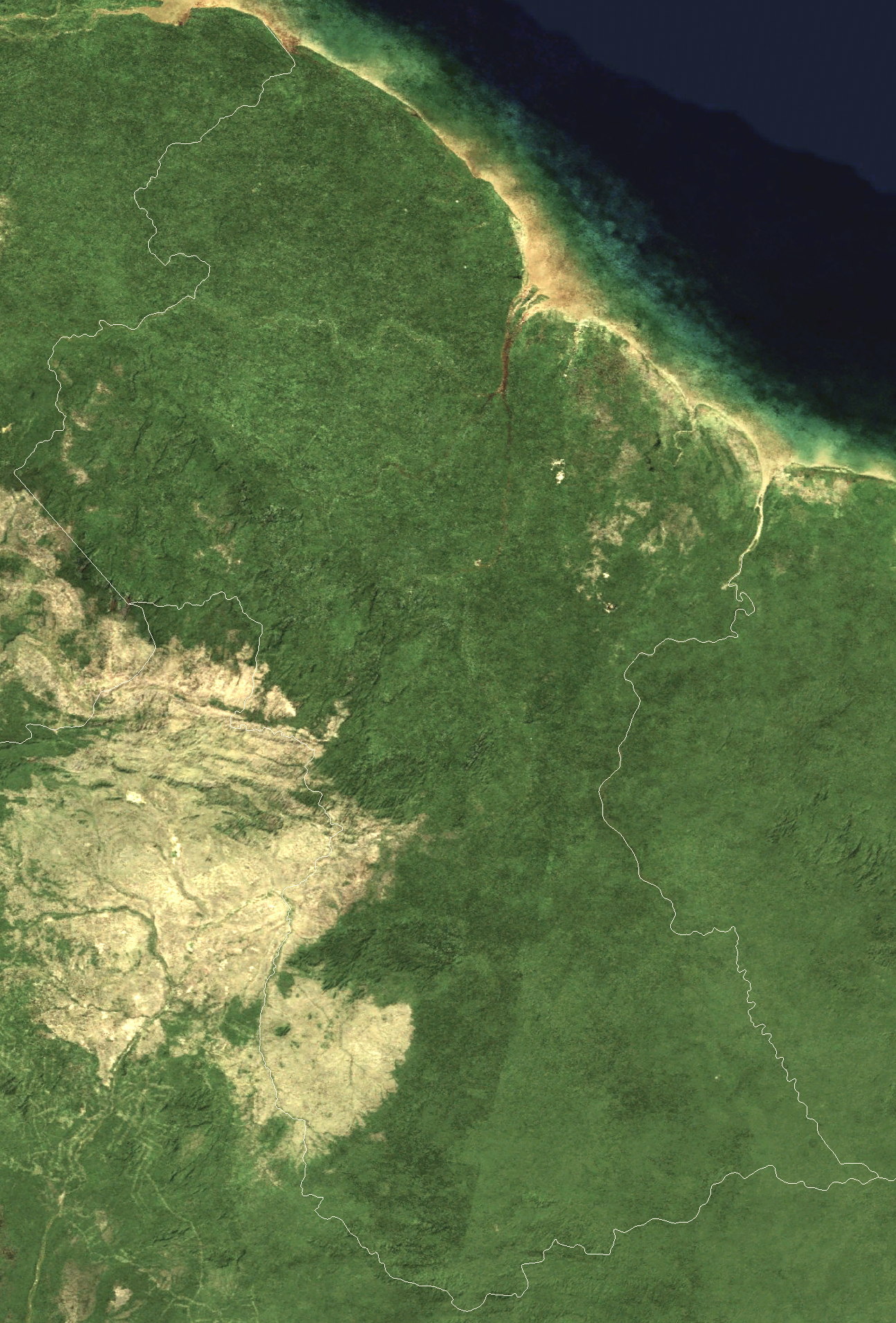
An enlargeable satellite image of Guyana

- Climate of Guyana
- Renewable energy in Guyana
- Wildlife of Guyana
  - Fauna of Guyana
    - Birds of Guyana
    - Mammals of Guyana

==== Natural geographic features of Guyana ====
- Islands of Guyana
- Rivers of Guyana
- Valleys of Guyana
- World Heritage Sites in Guyana: None

=== Regions of Guyana ===
==== Ecoregions of Guyana ====
List of ecoregions in Guyana

==== Administrative divisions of Guyana ====
Administrative divisions of Guyana

- Regions of Guyana
  - Neighborhood Councils of Guyana

===== Regions of Guyana =====
Regions of Guyana

===== Neighborhood Councils of Guyana =====
Neighborhood Councils of Guyana

===== Municipalities of Guyana =====
- Capital of Guyana: Georgetown
- Cities of Guyana

=== Demography of Guyana ===
Demographics of Guyana

== Government and politics of Guyana ==
Politics of Guyana

- Form of government: parliamentary representative democratic republic
- Capital of Guyana: Georgetown
- Elections in Guyana
- Political parties in Guyana

=== Branches of the government of Guyana ===
Government of Guyana

==== Executive branch of the government of Guyana ====
- Head of state and head of government: President of Guyana, Irfaan Ali

==== Legislative branch of the government of Guyana ====
- National Assembly (unicameral)

==== Judicial branch of the government of Guyana ====
Court system of Guyana

=== Foreign relations of Guyana ===
Foreign relations of Guyana

- Diplomatic missions in Guyana
- Diplomatic missions of Guyana

==== International organization membership ====
The Co-operative Republic of Guyana is a member of:

- African, Caribbean, and Pacific Group of States (ACP)
- Agency for the Prohibition of Nuclear Weapons in Latin America and the Caribbean (OPANAL)
- Caribbean Development Bank (CDB)
- Commonwealth of Nations
- Council of the Baltic Sea States (CBSS)
- Food and Agriculture Organization (FAO)
- Group of 77 (G77)
- Inter-American Development Bank (IADB)
- International Bank for Reconstruction and Development (IBRD)
- International Civil Aviation Organization (ICAO)
- International Criminal Court (ICCt)
- International Criminal Police Organization (Interpol)
- International Development Association (IDA)
- International Federation of Red Cross and Red Crescent Societies (IFRCS)
- International Finance Corporation (IFC)
- International Fund for Agricultural Development (IFAD)
- International Labour Organization (ILO)
- International Maritime Organization (IMO)
- International Monetary Fund (IMF)
- International Olympic Committee (IOC)
- International Organization for Migration (IOM) (observer)
- International Organization for Standardization (ISO) (subscriber)
- International Red Cross and Red Crescent Movement (ICRM)
- International Telecommunication Union (ITU)
- International Trade Union Confederation (ITUC)
- Latin American Economic System (LAES)
- Multilateral Investment Guarantee Agency (MIGA)
- Nonaligned Movement (NAM)
- Organisation of Islamic Cooperation (OIC)
- Organisation for the Prohibition of Chemical Weapons (OPCW)
- Organization of American States (OAS)
- Permanent Court of Arbitration (PCA)
- Rio Group (RG)
- Union of South American Nations (UNASUR)
- United Nations (UN)
- United Nations Conference on Trade and Development (UNCTAD)
- United Nations Educational, Scientific, and Cultural Organization (UNESCO)
- United Nations Industrial Development Organization (UNIDO)
- Universal Postal Union (UPU)
- World Confederation of Labour (WCL)
- World Customs Organization (WCO)
- World Federation of Trade Unions (WFTU)
- World Health Organization (WHO)
- World Intellectual Property Organization (WIPO)
- World Meteorological Organization (WMO)
- World Trade Organization (WTO)

=== Law and order in Guyana ===
Law of Guyana

- Law Enforcement in Guyana
- Cannabis in Guyana
- Constitution of Guyana
- Crime in Guyana
- Human rights in Guyana
  - LGBT rights in Guyana
  - Freedom of religion in Guyana

=== Military of Guyana ===
Military of Guyana

- Command
  - Commander-in-chief:
- Forces
  - Army of Guyana
  - Navy of Guyana
  - Air Force of Guyana
- Military ranks of Guyana

== History of Guyana ==
History of Guyana

- Timeline of the history of Guyana
- Current events of Guyana

== Culture of Guyana ==
Culture of Guyana

- Cuisine of Guyana
- Languages of Guyana
- National symbols of Guyana
  - Coat of arms of Guyana
  - Flag of Guyana
  - National anthem of Guyana
- People of Guyana
- Prostitution in Guyana
- Public holidays in Guyana
- Religion in Guyana
  - Christianity in Guyana
  - Hinduism in Guyana
  - Islam in Guyana
  - Sikhism in Guyana
- World Heritage Sites in Guyana: None

=== Art in Guyana ===
- Literature of Guyana
- Music of Guyana

=== Sports in Guyana ===
Sports in Guyana

- Football in Guyana
- Guyana at the Olympics

== Economy and infrastructure of Guyana ==
Economy of Guyana

- Economic rank, by nominal GDP (IMF 2020 estimate) : 148th (one hundred and forty eighth)
- Agriculture in Guyana
- Banking in Guyana
- Communications in Guyana
  - Internet in Guyana
- Companies of Guyana
- Currency of Guyana: Guyanese dollar
  - ISO 4217: GYD
- Mining in Guyana
- Guyana Stock Exchange
- Transport in Guyana
  - Airports in Guyana
  - Rail transport in Guyana
- Water supply and sanitation in Guyana

== See also ==
Guyana

- List of Guyana-related topics
- List of international rankings
- Member state of the Commonwealth of Nations
- Member state of the United Nations
- Outline of geography
- Outline of South America
