= Catholic Church in Guyana =

The Catholic Church in Guyana is part of the worldwide Catholic Church, under the spiritual leadership of the Pope in Rome. Bishops in Guyana are members of Antilles Episcopal Conference. Like most other nations that form the AEC, the Apostolic delegate to the bishops' conference is also the Apostolic nuncio to the country, currently American archbishop Thomas Edward Gullickson.

According to the 2012 census, Guyana has 52,901 Catholics, (7.08% of the total population). The country forms a single diocese, the Diocese of Georgetown, established in 1956.

Figures in 2020 suggested that 8% of the population were Catholic.

== Cultural impact ==
Various Catholic organisation have been involved in Guyana, including the Society of Jesus, Sisters of Mercy, and the Servants of the Lord and the Virgin of Matara. Santa Rosa Roman Catholic Church of Santa Rosa, Guyana of the Moruca sub-region was founded in 1818 for the Amerindians in the area. Many schools were founded by Catholics, although most have since been nationalised, such as St. Rose's High School and St. Stanislaus College.

The Church of England and the Church of Scotland had sole legal rights in Guyana until 1899, when the Catholic Church among others was given equal status. Most Catholics are Portuguese Guyanese. Its first native bishop, Benedict Ganesh Singh was ordained in 1971.

During the era of President Forbes Burnham, severe restriction on freedom of speech affected many organisations including the Catholic Standard. The murder of Bernard Darke which was meant for Andrew Morrison (both Jesuit priests), was a reaction to the paper's criticism of the government.

In 2023, the country had 24 parishes, served by 42 priests and 57 nuns.

== Notable people ==
- Stephen Campbell, first Amerindian member of Parliament
- Mary Noel Menezes, Roman Catholic nun and historian

== See also ==
- Religion in Guyana
- Pan-Amazonian Ecclesial Network (REPAM)
