= List of newspapers in Guyana =

This is a list of newspapers in Guyana.

== Newspapers ==
Newspaper	City	Founded	Publisher	Notes	URL
Guyana Chronicle	Georgetown	1975	Guyana National Newspaper Ltd.	Government-owned.	guyanachronicle.com
Village Voice Guyana	Georgetown			News site.	villagevoicenews.com
Demerara Waves	Georgetown			News site.	demerarawaves.com
Guyana Graphic	Georgetown			Not related to Guyana Graphic (1944-1975)	guyanagraphic.com
Guyana Press	Georgetown				guyanapress.com
Guyana Times	Georgetown	6 June 2008		News site.	guyanatimesgy.com
Kaieteur News	Georgetown			Private daily.	kaieteurnewsonline.com
The Official Gazette of Guyana	Georgetown			Official country Gazette	officialgazette.gov.gy
Stabroek News	Georgetown	1986		Private daily. (Absorbed The Guyana Review; est 1993)	stabroeknews.com
iNewsGuyana	Georgetown			News site.	inewsguyana.com
More News	Georgetown			Simplifying Guyana News	https://news.more.gy

== Defunct newspapers ==
Defunct newspapers include:

- Courant van Essequebo en Demerary - 1793, published in Stabroek, Essequibo. The oldest newspaper in the country.
- The Essequebo en Demerary Gazette - 1796. the first English language newspaper.
- Demerara Daily - fin. 1884. Published by C.K. Jardine.
- Berbice Gazette - Published in New Amsterdam by G.A. M'Kidd.
- Royal Gazette - Early 19th cen.
- The Colonist - 1884. Published by L. McDermott.
- The Argosy - 1880, printed a daily, weekly, and sports paper.
- Guyana Graphic - 1944-1975.
- The Echo - A weekly paper.
- The People - Published in Berbice.
- Freeman's Sentinel - Focused on Afro-Guyanese content.
- New Nation - Official publications of the People's National Congress.
- Mirror - Official publications of the PPP.
- A Liberdade - Portuguese language
- Indian Opinion - Focused on Indo-Guyanese content.
- The Workingman - Working-class content.
- The Liberator - Working-class content.
- Guyana Star - published by H.T. Harper

== Magazines ==
Magazines include:

- The Arts Journal - Literary journal.
- Commercial Review
- Guiana Diocesan Magazine
- Guiana Times (Also known as Times of Guiana) - 1947, published by Percy Armstrong. Anti-communist (PPP) content.
- Catholic Standard Magazine
- Guyana Journal of Public Administration
- Kaie - Literary journal, 1965-1985
- Kyk-Over-Al - Literary journal, Published by British Guiana Writers’ Association.
- New World Fortnightly - 1964
- Farm Journal - Formerly The Agricultural Journal of British Guiana
- Timehri - 1882, published by the Royal Agricultural and Commercial Society.
- British Guiana Medical Annual
- Police Magazine - Guyana Police Force
- The Scarlet Beret - Guyana Defence Force
- Chronicle Christmas Annual
- Queen’s College Annual - Established in 1936.
- Bishops’ High School Journal
- St. Stanislaus Magazine
- Guyana Historical Journal - Sporadically issued by the University of Guyana
- Guyana Law Journal - Sporadically issued by the University of Guyana
- Guyana Journal of Sociology and Transition - Sporadically issued by the University of Guyana
- Bar Association Review
- The Guyana Association of Professional Engineers Magazine
- Commercial Review
- Industrial Review
- Guyana Business
- The Public Servant
- Guiana Diocesan Magazine and Gazette
- Aarya Marga - Hindu
- Sandeep - Hindu
- The Islamic Muslim Journal
- Al Muallim
- African Emancipation
- Indian Horizons
- Ajedrez - Sport magazine
- Bourda Beat - Sport magazine
- Sports Beat - Sport magazine
- Caribbean Entertainer
- Guyana Entertainment Magazine (GEM) - 2002
- The Creole - 1803-1966 Published by William S. Stevenson. Political weekly journal.
- Thunder - PPP journal, 1950

== See also ==
- List of newspapers
- Telecommunications in Guyana
- Actual list with newspapers in Guyana
