= List of companies of Guyana =

Location of Guyana

Guyana is a sovereign state on the northern mainland of South America. It is, however, included in the Caribbean Region due to its strong cultural, historical, and political ties with the Caribbean Community (CARICOM). With 215,000 square kilometres (83,000 sq mi), Guyana is the fourth-smallest country on mainland South America after Uruguay, Suriname and French Guiana. The main economic activities in Guyana are agriculture (production of rice and Demerara sugar), bauxite mining, gold mining, timber, shrimp fishing and minerals. Chronic problems include a shortage of skilled labour and a deficient infrastructure.

== Notable firms ==
This list includes notable companies with primary headquarters located in the country. The industry and sector follow the Industry Classification Benchmark taxonomy. Organizations which have ceased operations are included and noted as defunct.

Notable companies Status: P=Private, S=State; A=Active, D=Defunct
Name	Industry	Sector	Headquarters	Founded	Notes	Status	
Bank of Guyana	Financials	Banks	Georgetown	1965	Central bank	S	A
Banks DIH	Consumer goods	Food products	Georgetown	1840	Food and beverage	P	A
Demerara Distillers	Consumer goods	Food products	Georgetown	1780	Food and beverage	P	A
ENet	Telecommunications	Telecommunications services	Georgetown	2003	Formerly E-Networks	P	A
Guyana Broadcasting Corporation	Consumer services	Broadcasting & entertainment	Georgetown	1979	State-owned broadcaster, merged with GTV to form National Communications Network	S	A
Guyana Chronicle	Consumer services	Publishing	Georgetown	1880	State-owned newspaper	S	A
Guyana Power and Light	Utilities	Conventional electricity	Georgetown	1957	Power utility	S	A
Guyana Sugar Corporation	Consumer goods	Food products	Skeldon	1976	Sugar	S	A
Guyana Telephone and Telegraph Company (GT&T)	Telecommunications	Fixed line telecommunications	Georgetown	1991	Telecom	P	A
Kaieteur News	Consumer services	Publishing	Georgetown	1994	Newspaper	P	A
National Communications Network, Guyana (NCN)	Consumer services	Broadcasting & entertainment	Georgetown	2004	State-owned television and radio broadcaster, Successor to Guyana Broadcasting Corporation	S	A
National Milling Company of Guyana	Consumer goods	Food products	Georgetown	1969	Flour mill, part of Seaboard Corporation (US)	P	A
Roraima Airways	Consumer services	Airlines	Georgetown	1992	Regional airline	P	A
Stabroek News	Consumer services	Publishing	Georgetown	1986	Newspaper	P	A
Trans Guyana Airways	Consumer services	Airlines	Georgetown	1951	Airline	P	A

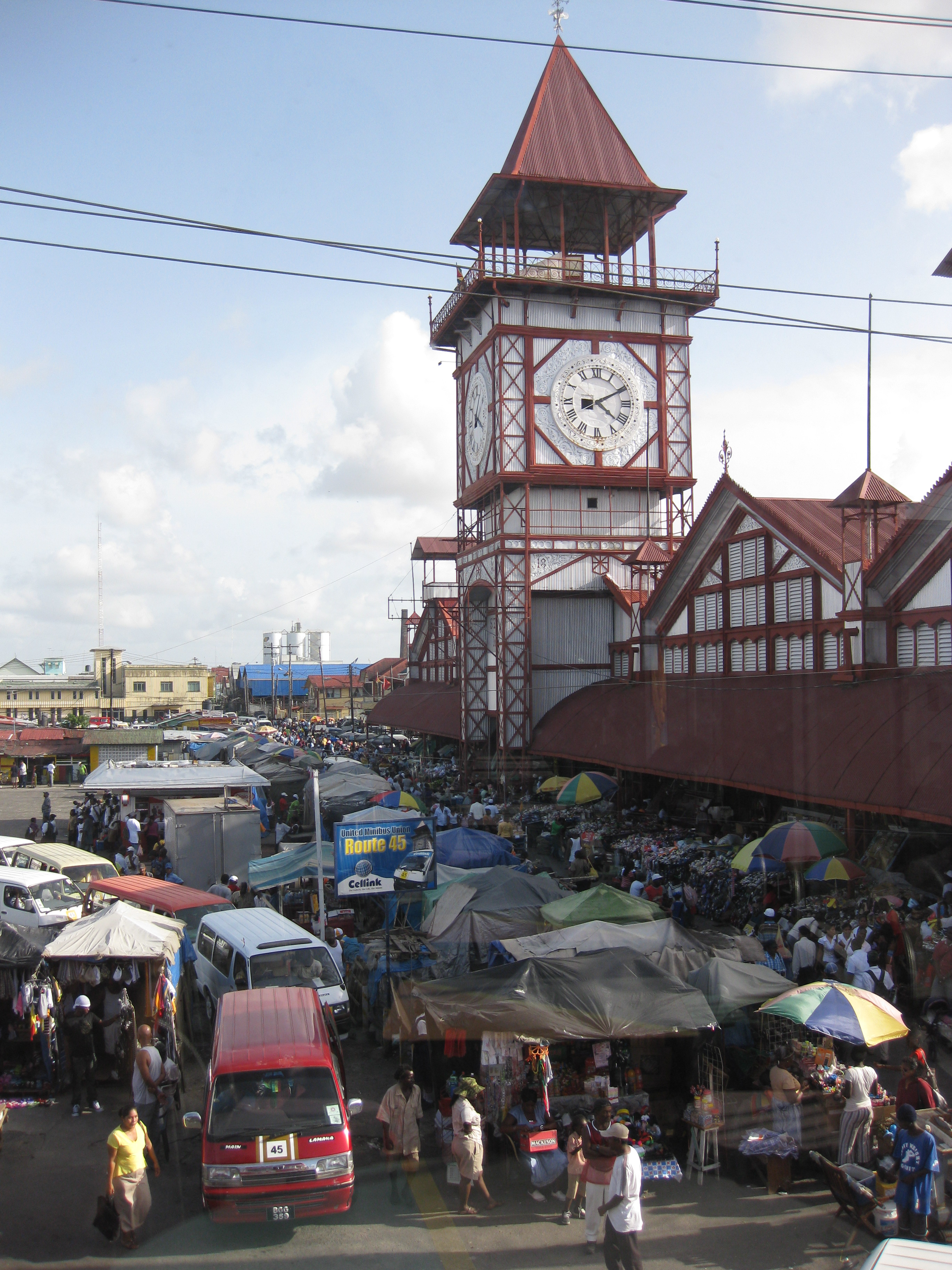
Stabroek Market, Georgetown

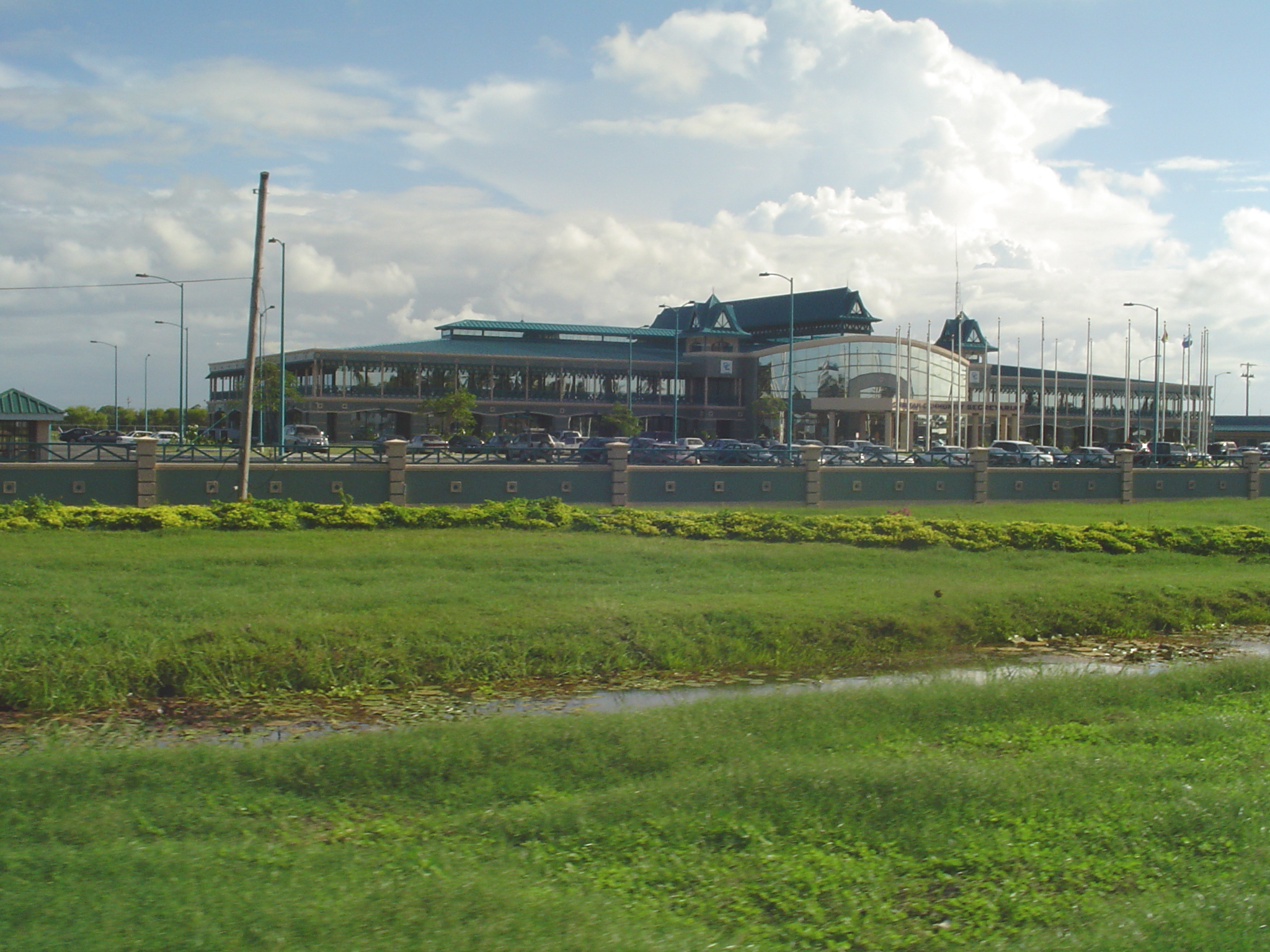
Caribbean Community headquarters

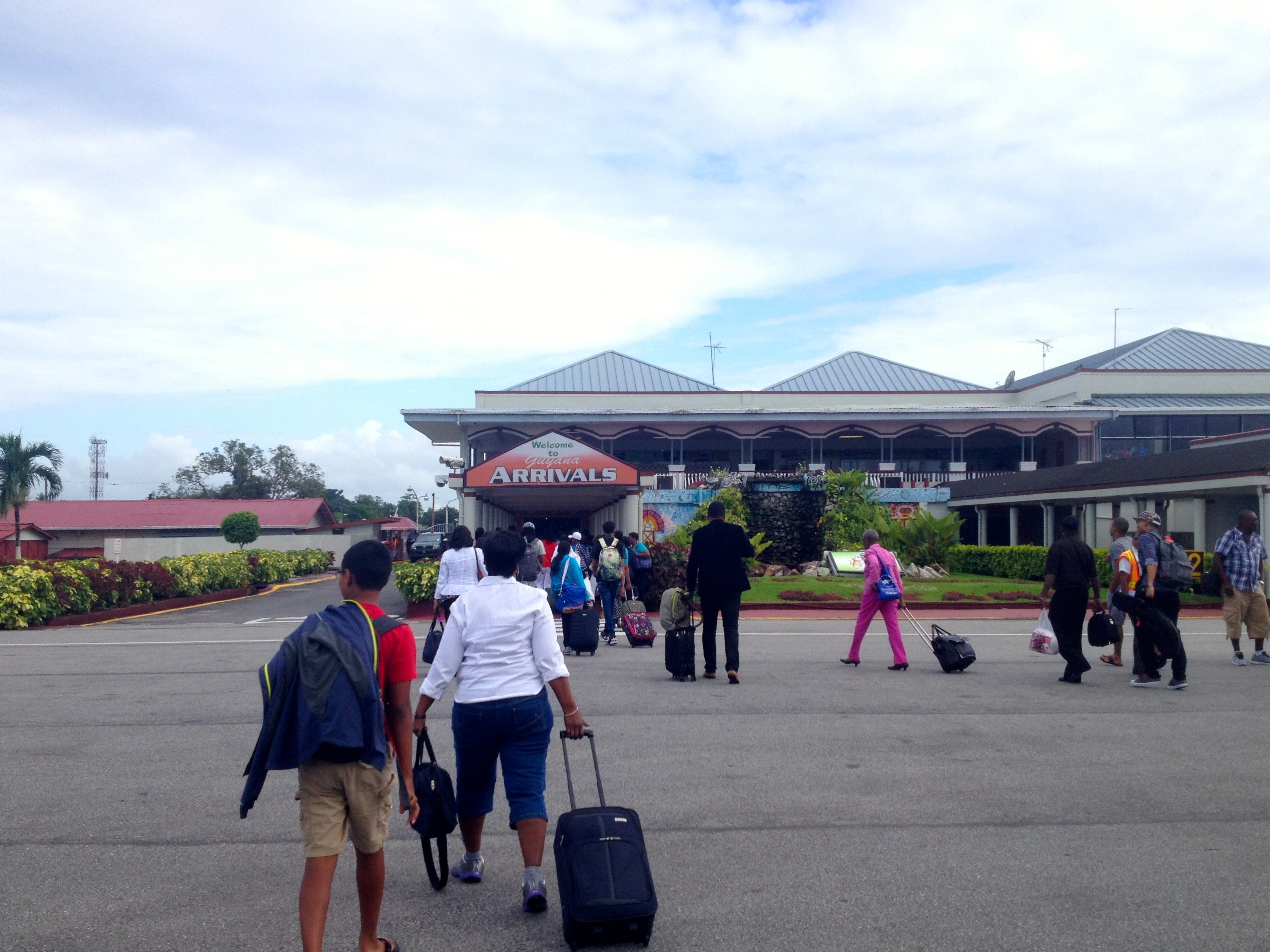
Cheddi Jagan International Airport in Georgetown
