= Religion in Guyana =

Religion in Guyana (2012 census)
1. Pentecostalism (22.8%)
2. Catholicism (7.08%)
3. Adventism (5.41%)
4. Anglicanism (5.22%)
5. Methodism (1.35%)
6. Jehovah's Witnesses (1.29%)
7. Other Christians (20.8%)
8. Hinduism (24.8%)
9. Islam (6.77%)
10. Other (1.38%)
11. None (3.14%)

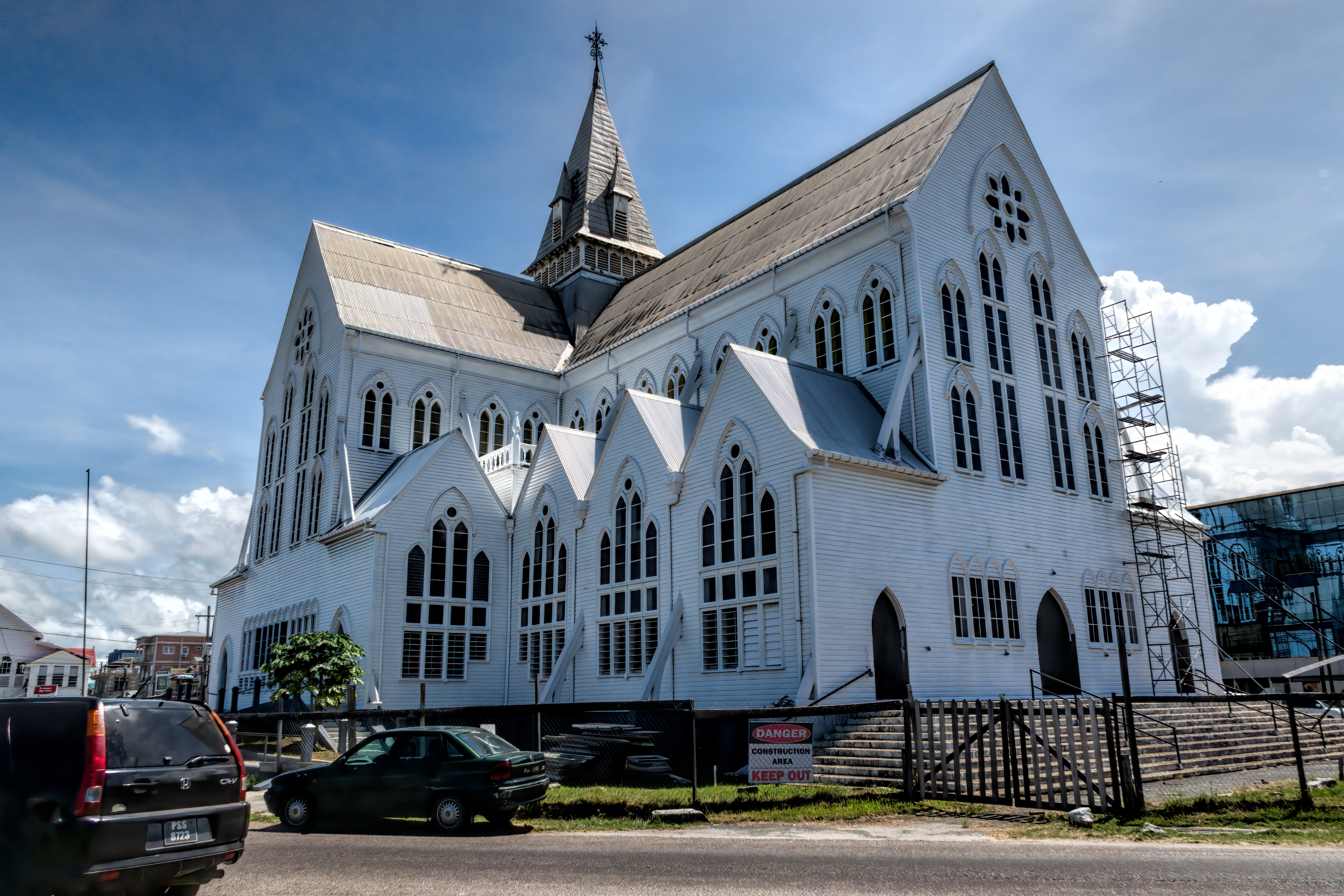
St. George's Anglican Cathedral in the capital Georgetown

Religion in Guyana is dominated by various branches of Christianity, with significant minorities of the adherents of Hinduism and Islam.

Guyana is a secular state and the nation's constitution guarantees freedom of religion and worship.

== Overview ==
Religions were reflected by East Indian, African, Chinese, and European ancestry, as well as a significant indigenous population. Members of all ethnic groups were well represented in all religious groups, with two exceptions: most Hindus were Indo-Guyanese, and nearly all Rastafarians were Afro-Guyanese people. Foreign missionaries from many religious groups were present. Christianity has historically been associated with Afro-Guyanese.

Practice of other beliefs made up 1% of the population, including the Rastafari movement, Buddhism, and the Baháʼí Faith. Approximately 3% of the population did not profess any religion.

Between 1991 and 2012, Hinduism, Islam, Catholicism and Mainline Protestant churches all saw significant decline as the national population grew by 3%. This is in contrast to Pentecostalism, which more than doubled, and less-established Christian groups, which nearly quadrupled in the same period.

== Religions ==
=== Christianity ===
Major religious groupings as % of the national population
Group	2002	2012
Pentecostal	17%	22.8%
Anglican	7%	5.2%
Seventh-day Adventist	5%	5.4%
Roman Catholicism	8.1%	7.1%
Other Christian groups	17.9%	20.8%

Christianity's status as Guyana's dominant system of values is a consequence of colonial history. To the European planters, colonial administrators, and missionaries, the profession of Christian beliefs and observance of Christian practices were prerequisites to social acceptance. Even though the planters discouraged the teaching of their religion to the slaves, Christianity eventually became as much the religion of the Africans as of the Europeans. Indeed, after abolition, Christian institutions played an even more important role in the lives of the former slaves than in the lives of the masters. By the time the East Indians and other indentured groups arrived in Guyana, a new syncretic Afro-Guyanese culture in which Christianity played an important part had already been established. Only since the mid-20th century, with the growth of the Indo-Guyanese population and the efforts of their ethnic and religious organizations, have Muslim and Hindu values and institutions been recognized as having equal status with those of Guyana's Christians.

Among the Christian denominations active in Guyana in the 1990s, the Anglican Church claimed the largest membership: about 125,000 adherents as of 1986 though this had declined to about 40,000 in 2012. Anglicanism was the state religion of British Guiana until independence. The Roman Catholic Church had a membership of about 94,000 in 1985 which declined to about 53,000 in 2012. The majority of Roman Catholics lived in Georgetown, and the Portuguese Guyanese were the most active members, although all the ethnic groups were represented. The Presbyterian Church was the third largest denomination, with nearly 39,000 members in 1980.

Several other Christian churches had significant memberships in 1980, including the Methodists (1.4% of the population), Pentecostals, and Seventh-day Adventists (5% of the population), each of which had about 20,000 members. There were smaller numbers of Baptists, Jehovah's Witnesses (1.3% of the population), Congregationalists, Nazarenes, Moravians, Ethiopian Orthodox, and other mainstream Christians. Other sects in Guyana included the Rastafari movement (0.5% of the population) which looks to Ethiopia for religious inspiration, and the Alleluia church, which combines Christian beliefs with Amerindian traditions.

About 20.8% (about 155,000) of the population describing themselves as Christian who had no formal church affiliation. Many rural villages and areas without churches have small gatherings with a group leader, sometimes unofficially called pastor without affiliation to a specific or official Christian church, though most tend to be Baptist or Evangelical in nature. These groups would have services, bible teachings and discussions at a neighbour's house or a provided empty location. Through organization, a village or a couple of villages might also provide Sunday School for children with a village member donating the space, many times the "bottom house", the empty space under a Guyanese house used for multiple purposes.

=== Hinduism ===
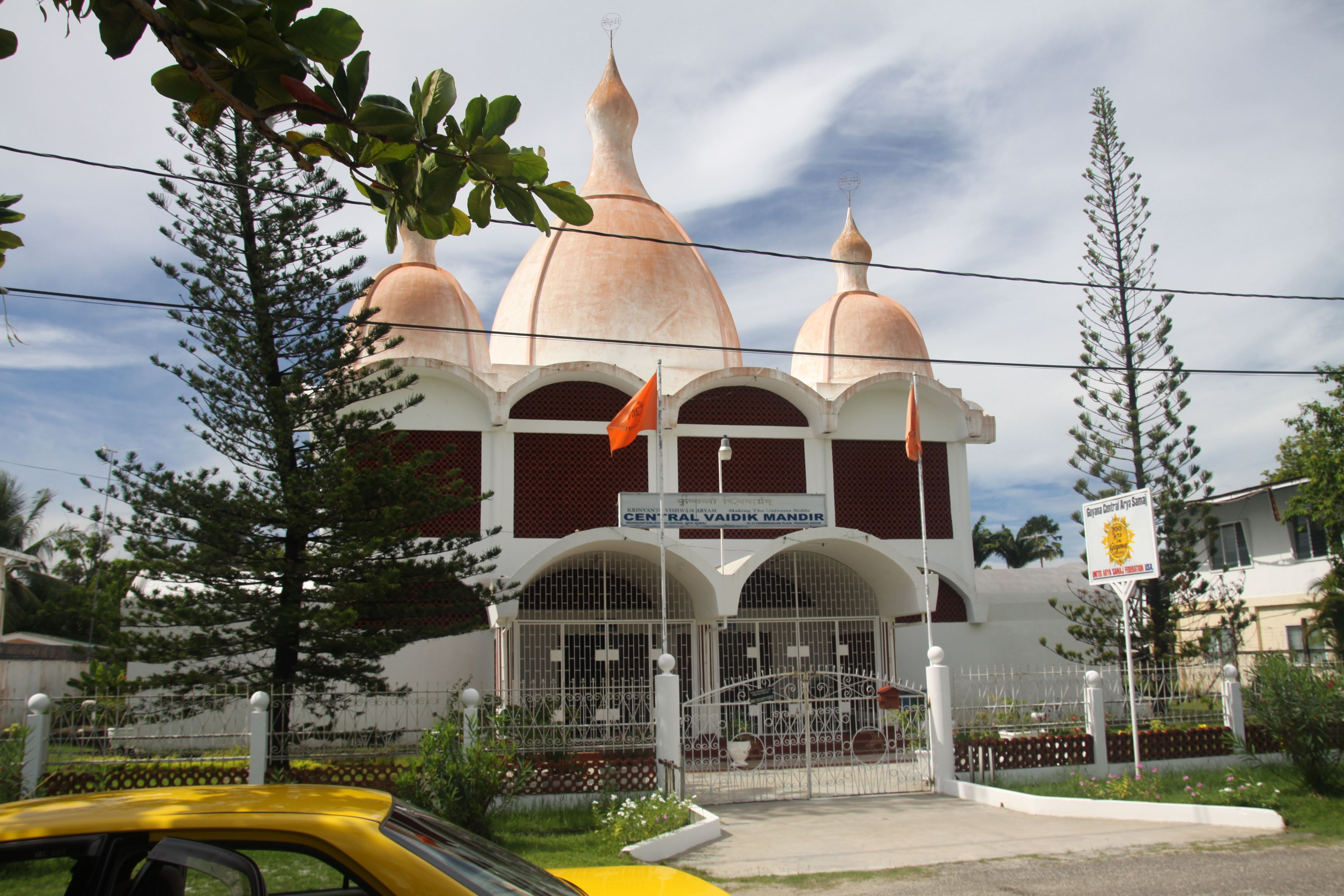
Central Vaidik Mandir in Georgetown

The number of Guyanese practising Hinduism has been decreasing for decades now, with 253,065 (35.0%) in 1991, 213,282 (28.4%) in 2002, and 185,000 (24.8%) practitioners in 2012. Its highest percentages are in Essequibo Islands-West Demerara and East Berbice Corentyne at 37.7% and 42.1% of the regional population respectively.

The majority of the East Indian immigrants were Bhojpuri speaking Hindus, of different castes leading to varied rituals. The Hindus worshipped the classic pantheon of Vishnu and Shiva. Hinduism remains the predominant religion of the Indo-Guyanese, although it has been considerably modified. Hinduism stresses the festivities accompanying religious rites. Festivals may last several days and are usually held in times of crisis or prosperity. Because the sponsor of a festival provides a tent and feeds a large number of guests, orthodox Hindu rituals require considerable outlays of money. A Hindu family has difficulty fulfilling ritual obligations unless it has accumulated a surplus of cash.

Since the late 1940s, reform movements have caught the attention of many Guyanese Hindus. The most important, the Arya Samaj movement, was founded in India in 1875.

The first Arya Samaj missionary arrived in Guyana in 1910. Arya Samaj (Hindi: आर्य समाज, lit. 'Noble Society', IAST: Ārya Samāja) is a monotheistic Indian Hindu reform movement that promotes values and practices based on the belief in the infallible authority of the Vedas. The movement is opposed to the use of images in worship as well as many traditional Hindu rituals.

=== Islam ===
In 2012, 50,272 Muslims lived in Guyana, making up 6.8% of the national population declining from 7.3% a decade before. Essequibo Islands-West Demerara has the highest percentage of Muslims making up 11.8% of the region. They can be organized into orthodox and reform movements, and split into Shias, Sufis, Sunnis and Ahmadiyyas. The Sunnatul Jamaat is the orthodox Sunni Islamic movement. The largest Islamic organization in the country is the Guyana United Sadr Islamic Anjuman.

=== Baháʼí Faith ===
The Baháʼí Faith is a relatively recent addition to the list of world religions represented in Guyana with the first local body (Local Spiritual Assembly) being established in Georgetown in 1955. National recognition came in 1976 when the National Spiritual Assembly of the Baháʼís of Guyana was incorporated by Act of Parliament. This body represents all Baháʼís in Guyana.

The 2002 Census enumerated 500 Baháʼís. In terms of religious practices and teachings, the Guyana Baháʼí community closely follows those of Baháʼí communities in other countries.

=== Judaism ===
Jews first came to Guyana in the 1660s, when Jewish settlers arrived in what was then the Dutch colony of Essequibo. Janet Jagan, an American-born Jewish woman, served as prime minister from March 17, 1997, to December 19, 1997, and as president of Guyana from December 19, 1997, to August 11, 1999.

=== Obeah ===
A number of folk beliefs continue to be practised in Guyana. Obeah, a folk religion of African origin, incorporates beliefs and practices of all the immigrant groups. Obeah practitioners may be Afro-Guyanese or Indo-Guyanese, and members of all the ethnic groups consult them for help with problems concerning health, work, domestic life, and romance. Some villagers wear charms or use other folk practices to protect themselves from harm.

Comfa is an Afro-Guyanese religion.

=== Indigenous religions ===
Traditional Amerindians religious beliefs vary, but shamans play a significant role in all of them. The shaman is believed to communicate with the world of spirits in order to detect sorcery and combat evil. The shaman is also a healer and an adviser, the representative of the village to the spiritual world and sometimes its political leader as well. Missionary activity to the Amerindians has been intense. As a result, the traditional beliefs and practices of all the Amerindian groups have been modified; some have even disappeared.

=== Cults ===
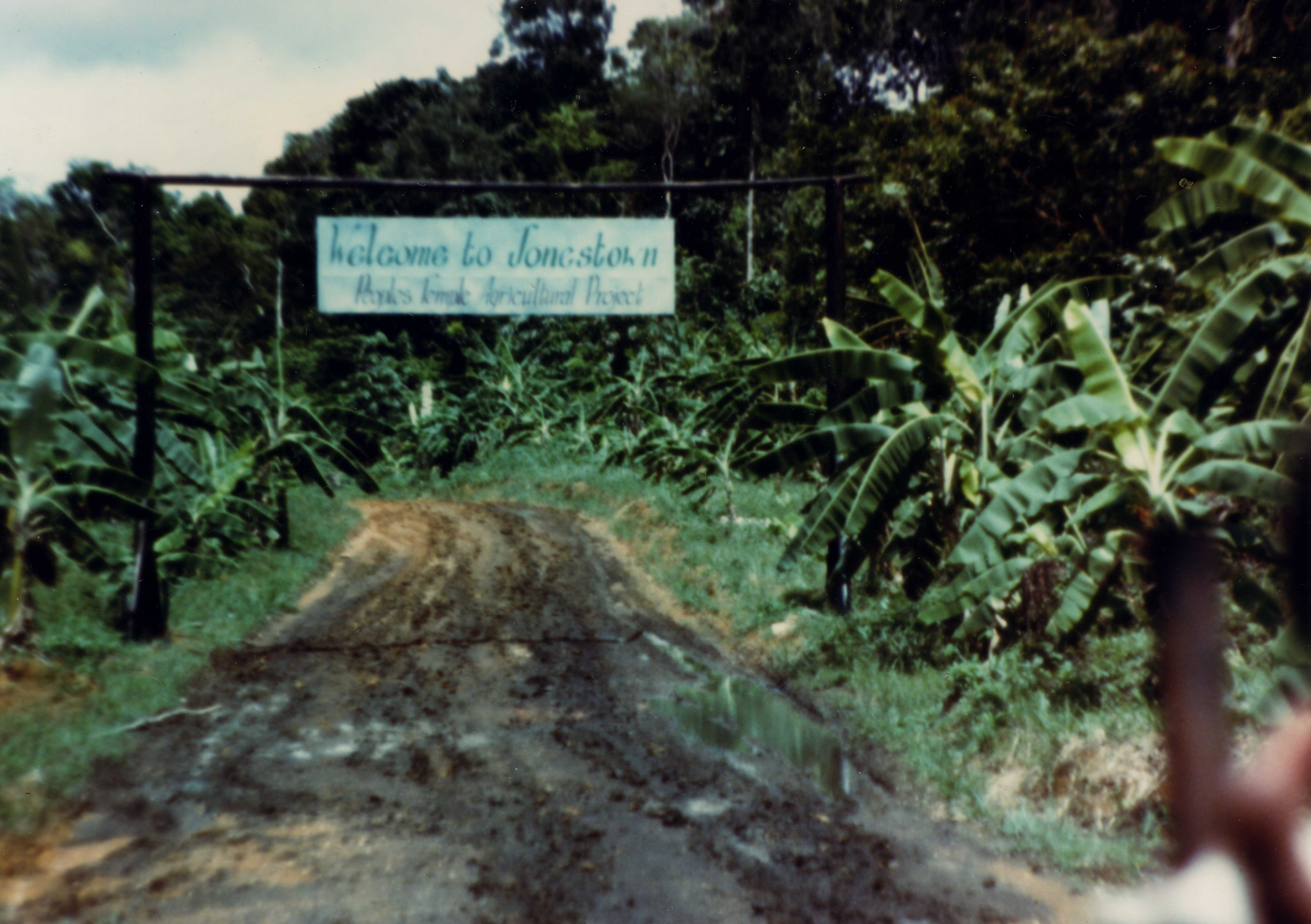
Entrance to Jonestown, a settlement founded by the Peoples Temple cult in 1974

Although not a Guyanese product, the country acquired international notoriety in November 1978 following a mass murder-suicide at Jonestown, the commune of the People's Temple of Christ, led by the Reverend Jim Jones, of Oakland, California. Guyana was chosen primarily for being socialist-leaning, as well as for being an English-speaking country.

The House of Israel was established by an American fugitive, David Hill, also known as Rabbi Edward Washington, who arrived in Guyana in 1972. The House of Israel preached the idea that Africans were the original Hebrews. Opponents of the government claimed that the House of Israel constituted a private army for Guyana's ruling party, the People's National Congress (PNC). When the government changed the leadership were arrested on a long-standing manslaughter charge, and sentenced to 15 years.

== Religion and politics ==
Through much of Guyana's history, the Anglican and Roman Catholic churches helped maintain the social and political status quo. The Roman Catholic Church and its newspaper, the Catholic Standard, were vocal opponents of the ideology of the People's Progressive Party (PPP) in the 1950s and became closely associated with the conservative United Force. However, in the late 1960s the Roman Catholic Church changed its stance toward social and political issues, and the Catholic Standard became more critical of the government. Subsequently, the government forced a number of foreign Roman Catholic priests to leave the country. By the mid-1970s, the Anglicans and other Protestant denominations had joined in the criticisms of government abuse. The Anglican and Roman Catholic churches also worked together, unsuccessfully, to oppose the government's assumption of control of church schools in 1976.

The Guyana Council of Churches was the umbrella organization for sixteen major Christian denominations. Historically, it had been dominated by the Anglican and Roman Catholic churches. The Guyana Council of Churches became an increasingly vocal critic of the government in the 1970s and 1980s, focusing international attention on its shortcomings. The conflict between the government and the Guyana Council of Churches came to a head in 1985, when members of the PNC-influenced House of Israel physically prevented the council from holding its annual meeting. Later that year, police searched the homes of the major Christian church leaders. The PNC maintained the support of a number of smaller Christian denominations, however.

In contrast to the most prominent Christian clergy, who maintained connections with international denominations, Hindu and Muslim leaders depended on strictly local support. For them, resistance to political pressure was more difficult. In the 1970s, the PNC succeeded in splitting many of the important Hindu and Muslim organizations into pro-PNC and pro-PPP factions.

== Freedom of religion ==
The Constitution of Guyana ensures freedom of religion, and the Government generally respects this right in practice. The U.S. government could locate no reports of societal abuses or discrimination based on religious belief or practice during 2007, and prominent societal leaders took positive steps to promote religious freedom.

In September 2009, forty mainly U.S. citizen missionaries from the Church of Jesus Christ of Latter-day Saints were detained briefly. Subsequently the 100+ missionaries were ordered to leave the country within a month. In addition to its missionary work, the church owns approximately $2 million in property in Guyana, and cultivate farms in the country. Missionaries have worked in the country for more than 20 years.

In 2023, the country scored 4 out of 4 for religious freedom; it was noted that religious groups can register places of worship and receive associated benefits without difficulty.
