= Kissoon =

Kissoon is a surname of Hindu Indian origin found in Fiji, Guyana, Jamaica, Mauritius, South Africa, Suriname, and Trinidad and Tobago. It is derived from Kishun or Kishan, which in Bhojpuri the "h" is silent, thus resulting is Kissoon. Kissoon is another name for the Hindu deity Krishna. The Kissoon surname is mainly attributed to the castes of brahmins and Kshatriyas coming from Uttar Pradesh or Bihar. Notable people with the surname include:

- Freddie Kissoon (born 1951), Guyanese journalist
- Jeffery Kissoon (born 1947), Trinidadian actor
- Mac and Katie Kissoon, Trinidadian male and female vocal duo
