= Freddie Kissoon =

Guyanese journalist

Frederick "Freddie" Kissoon
- Born: 30 December 1950 (age 75)
- Education: University of Guyana
- Occupations: Journalist (Kaieteur News), teacher
- Children: 1
- Website: Columnist's Page

Frederick Kissoon (born 30 December 1950) is a Guyanese journalist who writes the daily "Freddie Kissoon Column", currently published on TBN Heat. He also hosts a talk show with Leonard Gildarie.

Kissoon's column previously appeared in Kaieteur News, a daily newspaper published in Guyana. He was also a lecturer at the Faculty of Social Sciences of the University of Guyana, and the vice president for the University of Guyana Workers Union (UGWU). He fought many battle for the staff including better wages and benefit.

Kissoon initially made his impact in the 1970s as an "anarchist freshman at UG trying to confront the establishment of Forbes Burnham", a former President of Guyana who was considered by many as a dictator. At that time, he was a member of the Working People's Alliance led by Walter Rodney. Rodney was killed in a bomb explosion while running for office in 1980.

In 1988, Kissoon became a columnist for an independent Newspaper, the Catholic Standard, which at the time was the only independent newspaper in Guyana. The other newspapers were the Guyana Chronicle, a government controlled newspaper, and The Mirror, a newspaper of the then opposition party, the People's Progressive Party led by Cheddi Jagan. In the 1990s, Kissoon began writing for a new independent newspaper, the Stabroek News.

== Property tax dispute ==
In 2009, the Guyana Revenue Authority issued eight property tax forms to Kissoon. The reason was that he was delinquent with his property taxes. Kissoon responded harshly to the Commissioner-General of the Guyana Revenue Authority stating, "I have worked at UG for 23 years. My wife has worked for 26 years. Together we saved our money in the bank after paying PAYE and after the bank would have paid withholding tax on the interest the bank gives. Now Khurshid Sattaur, Head of the Guyana Revenue Authority (GRA), has requested that for the past nine years I submit property tax. For those who don’t know, property tax means all assets including furniture, cars, jewellery, homes and bank account."

== Libel case ==
Kissoon and his employers lost an appeal against an interlocutory judgment in a libel case brought by Guyanese President Bharrat Jagdeo in June 2011. The defendants were ordered not to repeat the allegations in question, and to pay a $40,000 fine. The full hearing was scheduled to take place on 19 August 2011. The case was withdrawn in 2020.
