= William Clancy =

Irish Roman Catholic missionary (1802-1847)

The Right Rev. William Clancy
- Vicar Apostolic of British Guiana
- Church: Roman Catholic Church
- See: Apostolic Vicariate of British Guiana
- In office: 12 April 1837—3 September 1843
- Predecessor: none
- Successor: John Thomas Hynes, O.P.
- Previous posts: Coadjutor Bishop of Charleston (1834-1837); Professor Carlow College (1829-1934)

Orders
- Ordination: 24 May 1823
- Consecration: 21 December 1834

Personal details
- Born: 12 February 1802 West Cork, Ireland
- Died: 19 June 1847 (aged 45) Ireland
- Education: St. Patrick's, Carlow College; Maynooth College

William Clancy (12 February 1802 – 19 June 1847) was an Irish Roman Catholic missionary in the United States and British Guiana.

== Life ==
The son of a farmer, William Clancy was born in West Cork and educated at St. Patrick's, Carlow College in Carlow, and St Patrick's College, Maynooth. He was ordained to the priesthood at Maynooth on 24 May 1823. He then served as a curate until 1829, when he became a professor of theology at St. Patrick's, Carlow.

John England, Bishop of Charleston, South Carolina, had been appointed as the Pope’s Legate to the Government of Haiti. Due to the additional responsibilities, England requested assistance. On 30 October 1834 Clancy was appointed Coadjutor Bishop of Charleston, South Carolina and Titular Bishop of Oreus by Pope Gregory XVI. He received his episcopal consecration on the following 21 December at the Cathedral of the Assumption, Carlow, from Bishop Edward Nolan, with Archbishop Michael Slattery and Bishop William Kinsella serving as co-consecrators. He served as coadjutor to Bishop John England, who was busied with the vast jurisdiction of the diocese and his work as papal legate to Haiti.

== Charleston, South Carolina ==
Clancy's arrival in Charleston was delayed to a severe illness. Upon recovering, he visited family and friends in Cork and Carlow, and attempted to recruit priests and seminarians for Charleston. A personal reluctance also factored into his delay: "If there is any other place where the knowledge of philosophy and theology and the faculty of preaching in English would rebound to the glory of God [let me go there]. If however the Holy Father insists I shall go with a heavy heart." He finally arrived in Charleston in November 1835.

After a few months' dissatisfied sojourn, Clancy requested a transfer to another field. He claimed there was an insufficient amount of work to be done, and Bishop England wrote to Rome: "He is very distinguished for his character, zeal and piety, but in one year he has wrecked that whole constitutional system of church government which has taken me years to perfect." He attended the Third Provincial Council of Baltimore in 1837, and in July of that year was translated to the see of Demerara, British Guiana (Guyana)as Vicar Apostolic of British Guiana.

=== Washington Irving ===
In 1837, a Protestant lady brought to Clancy's attention a passage in The Crayon Miscellany, and questioned whether it accurately reflected Catholic teaching or practice. The passage under "Newstead Abbey" read:

One of the parchment scrolls thus discovered, throws rather an awkward life upon the kind of life led by the friars of Newstead. It is an indulgence granted to them for a certain number of months, in which a plenary pardon is assured in advance for all kinds of crimes, among which, several of the most gross and sensual are specifically mentioned, and the weaknesses of the flesh to which they were prone.

Clancy wrote Irving, who "...promptly aided the investigation into the truth, and promised to correct in future editions the misrepresentation complained of...." Clancy traveled to his new posting by way of England, and bearing a letter of introduction from Irving, stopped at Newstead Abbey and was able to view the document to which Irving had alluded. Upon inspection, Clancy discovered that the document was not any sort of indulgence issued to the friars from any ecclesiastical authority, but a pardon given by the king to some parties suspected of having broken "forest laws". Clancy requested the local pastor to forward his findings to Catholic periodicals in England, and upon publication, forward a copy to Irving. Whether this was done is not clear as the disputed text remains in the 1849 edition.

== British Guiana ==
Clancy recruited clergy from Italy, Austria, England and his native Ireland, also introducing the Presentation Sisters. He resigned as Vicar Apostolic on 3 September 1843. Retiring to Ireland, he died at Cork less than four years later, aged 45.

Catholic Church titles
Preceded by none	Vicar Apostolic of British Guiana; 1838–1860	Succeeded by John Thomas Hynes, O.P.
