= Andrew Morrison (Jesuit) =

Guyanese Catholic priest (1919–2004)

The Reverend Andrew Morrison, SJ

Editor of the Catholic Standard
- In office July 1976 – 1995

Vicar General of the Diocese of Georgetown
- In office 1972–1976

Personal details
- Born: 5 June 1919 Georgetown, British Guiana
- Died: 26 January 2004 (aged 84) Guyana
- Occupation: Priest, journalist, activist

Andrew Morrison, SJ (5 June 1919 – 26 January 2004) was a Guyanese Roman Catholic Jesuit priest, journalist, and pro-democracy activist.

== Early life and education ==
Morrison was born on 5 June 1919 in Georgetown, British Guiana. He attended high school at St. Stanislaus College and attended a Jesuit institution for college. He studied accounting, and following graduation, he returned to Georgetown to work at an accounting firm.

== Career ==
Morrison joined the Society of Jesus in 1949 at the age of 30, and was sent to Great Britain to study for the priesthood, as Guyana is a member of the Jesuits' British Province. He was ordained a priest on 31 July 1957, the feast day of St. Ignatius of Loyola, the founder of the Society of Jesus.

He was sent back to British Guiana (independent Guyana since 1966) and served as youth chaplain of the Green Light Organisation, a Catholic social ministry. During this time, he founded the Camp Kayuka on the Soesdyke-Linden Highway. In 1972, Morrison was appointed Vicar General of the Diocese of Georgetown, a position he held for four years.

In July 1976, Morrison was appointed Editor of the Catholic Standard, the newspaper of the Diocese of Georgetown and the only religious newspaper in Guyana. In 1979 he founded the Guyana Human Rights Association.

Morrison's first international public episode, was his coverage of the Jim Jones led mass suicide-massacre, which took place in 1978 in Guyana. A year later, an assassination attempt upon his life failed because a fellow Jesuit was mistaken for Morrison. Father Bernard Darke was brutally murdered. Such attempts to frustrate Morrison's quest for justice and rights had absolutely no effect upon him. He publicly exposed a plot by members of the governing regime to assassinate an opposition Guyanese politician (Rodney) in the paper he headed, the Catholic Standard. Amidst awards and honours from the international community, he lamented the state of his countrymen and further hardships experienced by the certain fellow Jesuit elements, supporters of his cause. Connors was deported from Guyana.

Morrison died in his Georgetown home on 26 January 2004, at the age of 84. He was buried in the Sacred Heart Church in Georgetown.

== Legacy ==
Fredrick Kissoon, Ricky Singh and Hugh O'Shaughnessy described him as a 'Symbol of courage' and one who went about living serenely amidst insecurity; an insecurity that had his co-workers quite nervous but was of no concern to him. He is regarded as an important figure contributing to media freedom in Guyana.

He was awarded a Maria Moors Cabot Special Citation by Columbia University in New York in 1985 and the Titus Brandsma Award in the Netherlands in 1992.

== Bibliography ==
- Justice: The Struggle For Democracy in Guyana, 1952-1992. Georgetown, Guyana: Red Thread Women's Press. 1998. ISBN 9789768157522.
