= Omar Khan (military) =

Guyana Defence Force chief

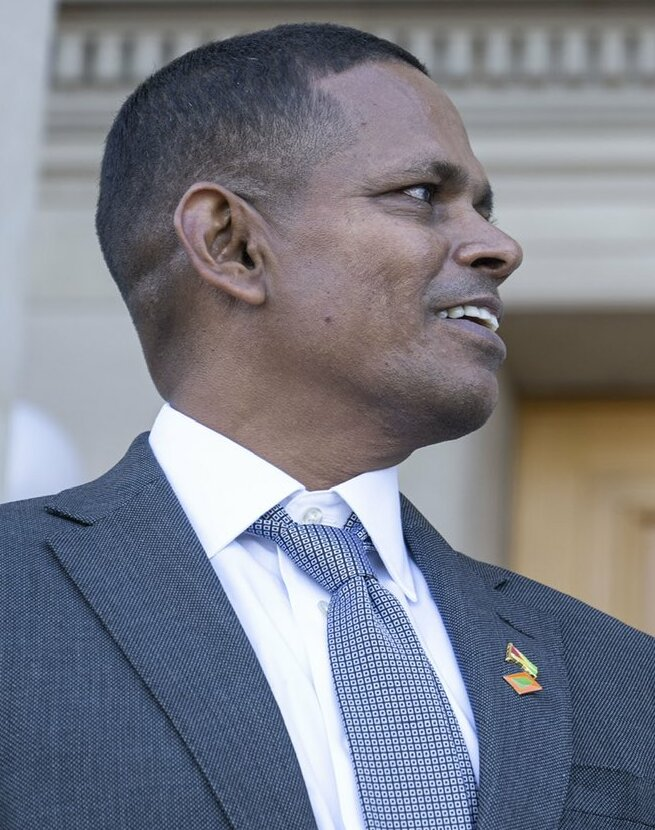
- Khan in 2023

Chief of Defence Staff of the Guyana Defence Force
- Incumbent
- Assumed office 29 April 2023
- President: Irfaan Ali
- Preceded by: Godfrey Bess

Chief of the National Intelligence and Security Agency
- In office 2010–2016
- In office 2020–2023

Personal details
- Born: 1971 or 1972 (age 54–55) Guyana

Military service
- Allegiance: Guyana
- Branch/service: Guyana Defence Force
- Years of service: 1992–present
- Rank: Brigadier general

Omar Khan (born 1971 or 1972) is a Guyanese military officer, currently serving as the chief (brigadier general) of the Guyana Defence Force (GDF) since April 2023. He also served twice as chief of the intelligence service of Guyana.

== Biography ==
Khan began his military career in 1991, and was commissioned as an officer, Second Lieutenant in 1992. On graduating, he became first a Platoon Commander in the 1st Infantry Battalion. He went on to serve in several other units across the Defence Force including the Intelligence, Training, Maritime, and Defence Headquarters.

He was a military instructor in both territorial, intelligence, maritime units, and later became verse in strategic defence studies specialising in defence operations and capabilities. He had command stincts as a Company Commander of an infantry company, and later in 2017, he served as a Battalion Commander of an infantry battalion.

Between 2010 and 2016 and again between 2020 and 2023, Khan served as the chief of the National Intelligence and Security Agency (NISA), Guyana's intelligence service.

In February 2024, amid growing tensions with Venezuela, Khan met with the Deputy Commander of the United States Southern Command Evan Pettus, who promised that the US would assist Guyana in advancing air defence capabilities.

As Chief of Defence Staff of the GDF, Khan has commanded the forces in the ongoing territorial dispute with Venezuela, where Venezuela demands sovereignty over Guyana-controlled Essequibo. Khan ordered the reinforcement of GDF troops on the border with Venezuela after 6 GDF soldiers were shot and wounded by armed Venezuelan civilians in May 2025. In the same month, Khan warned Venezuelans living in Guyana against participating in a referendum proposed by the Venezuelan government on the sovereignty of the Essequibo region, threatening them with arrest and deportation.

Khan has also called on indigenous populations near the border with Venezuela to share information all relevant information with the GDF.
