= Chief of Defence Staff (Guyana) =

Head of the armed forces of Guyana

- Flag of the Guyana Defence Headquarters

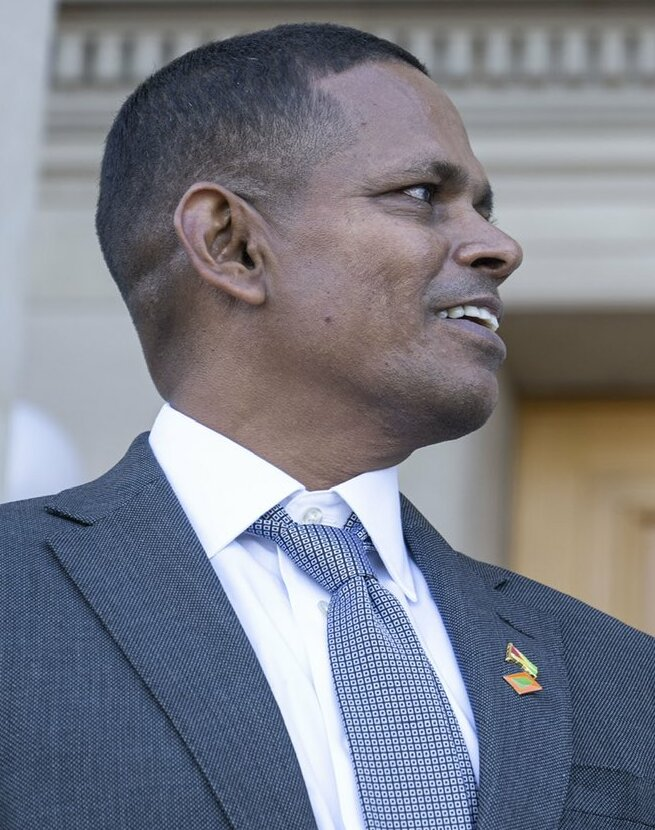
- Incumbent; Brigadier Omar Khan since 28 April 2023
- Reports to: President of Guyana
- Formation: May 1967
- First holder: Ronald Pope

The Chief of Defence Staff is the professional head of the Guyana Defence Force. They are responsible for the administration and the operational control of the military of Guyana. The current Chief of Defence Staff is Brigadier Omar Khan.

The office was officially known as the 'Chief of Staff' until 2024 when the Defence (Amendment) Act 2024 was passed giving effect to the new name of the office.

== List of officeholders ==
=== Chief of Staff (1967–2024) ===
- Acting

No.	Portrait	Name (Birth–Death)	Term of office			Ref.
No.	Portrait	Name (Birth–Death)	Took office	Left office	Time in office	Ref.
1		Colonel; Ronald Pope	May 1967	March 1969	1 year, 10 months	
2		Brigadier; Clarence Price (1922–?)	March 1969	12 July 1979	10 years, 4 months	
3		Major general Norman Gordon Mc Lean (born 1935)	12 July 1979	March 1990	10 years, 7 months	
4		Major general Joseph Singh (born 1945)	March 1990	April 2000	10 years, 1 month	
5		Major general Michael Atherly (born 1949)	April 2000	31 May 2004	4 years, 1 month	
6		Major general Edward Orin Collins (born 1945)	31 May 2004	2007	2–3 years	
7		Rear admiral Gary Best (born 1959)	September 2007	16 September 2013	6 years	
8		Brigadier; Mark Phillips (born 1961)	16 September 2013	3 October 2016	3 years, 17 days	
9		Brigadier; George Lewis (born 1961)	3 October 2016	10 January 2017	99 days	
10		Brigadier; Patrick West (born 1965)	10 January 2017	1 July 2020	3 years, 173 days	
–		Brigadier; Godfrey Bess (born 1968)	1 July 2020	4 March 2021	246 days	
11		Brigadier; Godfrey Bess (born 1968)	4 March 2021	28 April 2023	2 years, 55 days	
12		Brigadier; Omar Khan (born 1972)	28 April 2023	24 May 2024	1 year, 26 days	

=== Chief of Defence Staff (2024–present) ===
- Acting

No.	Portrait	Name (Birth–Death)	Term of office			Ref.
No.	Portrait	Name (Birth–Death)	Took office	Left office	Time in office	Ref.
1		Brigadier; Omar Khan	24 May 2024	Incumbent	2 years, 137 days	

== See also ==
- Guyana Defence Force
