= Joseph Hamilton (politician) =

Guyanese politician

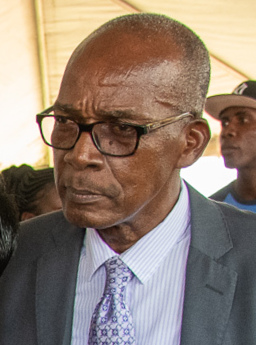
- Hamilton in 2022

Minister of Labour in Guyana
- Incumbent
- Assumed office August 2020
- Appointed by: Irfaan Ali

Personal details
- Born: 1953-54 Triumph, British Guiana
- Party: People's Progressive Party (Guyana)
- Occupation: Politician

Joseph Linden Fitzclarence Hamilton (born in Guyana) is a Guyanese politician. Hamilton was born in Triumph, British Guiana. Between 1977 and 1987, Hamilton was a priest of the House of Israel. At the 2014 Walter Rodney inquiry, Hamilton testified that the House of Israel committed "oppressive and terrorizing acts on behalf of the People's National Congress (PNC)."

Hamilton is the current Guyanese Minister of Labour in Guyana. Hamilton was sworn in as Minister under President Irfaan Ali cabinet. He was appointed Minister in August 2020. Prior to his appointment as Minister, he was the Parliamentary Secretary under the Ministry of Health.
