= Catholic Standard (Guyana) =

Weekly newspaper of the Roman Catholic Diocese of Georgetown, Guyana

- Type: Weekly newspaper
- Format: Broadsheet
- Owner: Society of Jesus
- Founder(s): Compton Theodore Galton, SJ
- Editor: Naomi Collins (acting)
- Founded: April 1905
- Language: English
- Headquarters: Georgetown, Guyana
- Circulation: 14,000
- Website: http://catholicstandard.webs.com
- Free online archives: https://issuu.com/rcgy

The Catholic Standard is the weekly newspaper of the Roman Catholic Diocese of Georgetown, and the only religious newspaper in Guyana. Founded in 1905 by the Society of Jesus, it was the only independent newspaper in Guyana during the turbulent period of strongman President Forbes Burnham's rule, and it played a large role in the Guyanese struggle for democracy.

== History ==
The Catholic Standard was founded in April 1905 by Compton Theodore Galton, SJ, Bishop of Georgetown. It began as a monthly magazine, and only in 1954 was a 'monthly paper' introduced alongside the magazine. Shortly after, it became biweekly, and in January 1962 began being published weekly on Friday and distributed on the weekend, the system that has remained ever since.

During the turbulent political era of the 1970s, 80s, and early 90s, the Catholic Standard played a pivotal role in the Guyanese struggle for democracy. It was for many years the sole independent newspaper in Guyana, with Catholics and non-Catholics alike turning to it for objective news.

Fr. Harold Wong, SJ, succeeded Fr. Terence Petry, SJ, as editor of the Catholic Standard in March 1967, at the young age of 37. His mission as editor, he said, was:

"to change the character and image of the paper to reflect a more militant church's concern for the people [...] I was determined to ensure that while I was editor, the Standard would not merely publish the usual religious news items but also demonstrate an awareness of the public issues of the day by analyzing and commenting with fairness and courage on those issues."

Indeed, Wong did transform the Standard, from a modest diocesan bulletin to a more widely circulated newspaper with a strong pro-democracy message. The newspaper's new direction, especially harsh criticism of the 1973 election, brought Wong into tense conflict with President Forbes Burnham, Guyana's dictator at the time. Burnham authorized unwarranted searches of independent media property, and forced the Catholic Standard and The Mirror, another the only other opposition newspaper, to buy newsprint from Guyana National Newspapers at inflated prices.

In November 1973, Wong was ordered to resign as editor by the Guyanese government after penning an editorial titled "Fairytale Elections", writing about the presidential elections of that year. He did not resign, and remained editor until July 1976, when he was succeeded by Fr. Andrew Morrison, SJ, an Anglo-Guyanese native who had recently returned from Great Britain, was named as his replacement. While Wong had certainly increased the prestige of the Catholic Standard, it was still fairly small and limited to mostly Catholic circles. Morrison was responsible for shifting it to a more radical political leaning and greatly increasing its circulation. On 14 July 1979, Fr. Bernard Darke, a part-time photographer of the Catholic Standard, was stabbed to death in broad daylight by the House of Israel, a black cult-like group now believed to have been on the payroll of the Burnham government. Most now believe that Morrison was the actual target, and that the Guyanese government had orchestrated the murder as a response to the Catholic Standard's "extremely critical" coverage of the regime.

This further galvanized Morrison and other staff of the Catholic Standard to continue their censorious coverage of the Burnham government. Fr. Michael Campbell-Johnston, SJ, wrote in the foreword of Morrison's 1998 book Justice: The Struggle For Democracy in Guyana, 1952-1992:

"As a journalist [Morrison's] duty was not only to record events in factual and unbiased manner but also to investigate them and uncover the veils of secrecy and corruption in which they were all too often shrouded [...] All of this demanded dedication, courage, and occasional subterfuge. That Andrew Morrison rose to the challenge is amply testified to by his various international prizes and awards."

Throughout the 1980s and early 1990s, especially during the reign of Desmond Hoyte, the Catholic Standard remained one of Guyana's few independent newspapers, and Editor Fr. Andrew Morrison gained international recognition for himself and the newspapers, receiving six awards for his and the Standard's struggle for press freedom and the implementation of democracy in Guyana. In 1995, Fr. Morrison was replaced as editor by Colin Smith, the first lay editor in the Catholic Standard's history. However, the Jesuits still remained actively involved in the newspaper, and there are three priests on staff as of April 2016. During Smith's editorship, the newspaper changed from a politically-oriented newspaper back to covering mostly domestic and international Catholic religious topics. Editor Smith reflected on the change, saying:

"With the advent of Stabroek News and more so the Kaieteur News, there was no real need for the Catholic Standard to do what it was doing. They [Stabroek and Kaieteur] did much better; they had a lot more resources, human and financial. The whole scenario changed. The dictatorship under Burnham didn't exist anymore. The political situation changed completely, and there was no need for the Standard, with its few resources, to do what it was doing when these two other papers had come on board.

The bishop and the board of directors of the Catholic Standard have decided that there was a need to change focus because our main constituency is Catholics. There is a role for the Church to play in the promotion of justice and human rights, which was probably a more important role for it to play during the Burnham and early Hoyte days. But our goal, our focus, as I said, is Catholics and the Catholic faith, and the board said that we shouldn't forget this constituency, who perhaps did not agree with what we were doing in the days of Father Morrison, but went along nevertheless."

In 2012, the Catholic Standard began publishing an online edition of the paper, which is emailed to subscribers every week.

As of 2013, around 14,000 issues were printed weekly, of which about 100 were sent overseas every week.

Colin Smith died on 16 October 2021 at the age of 70, and Naomi Collins became the Acting Editor.

== Editors ==
- Fr. Terence Petry, SJ (?–1967)
- Fr. Harold Wong, SJ (1967–1976)
- Fr. Andrew Morrison, SJ (1976–1995)
- Colin Smith (1995–2021)
- Naomi Collins (acting, 2021)

== See also ==
- Media of Guyana
