= House of Israel (Guyana) =

Religious denomination

The House of Israel is a Black Hebrew Israelites religious organisation in Guyana founded in 1972 by Rabbi Washington which claims that Africans were the original Hebrews, and that Jesus Christ was black. During the 1970s and 1980s, it was often described as a cult. It was associated with the People's National Congress government under Forbes Burnham, and was sometimes described as its paramilitary arm.

== History ==
The House of Israel was established by an American fugitive, David Hill, also known as Rabbi Edward Washington, who arrived in Guyana in 1972. In the 1970s, the group claimed a membership of 8,000. The House of Israel had a daily radio programme in which it preached that Africans were the original Hebrews. Opponents of the government claimed that the House of Israel constituted a private army for Guyana's ruling party, the People's National Congress (PNC).

During an anti-government demonstration, a House of Israel member murdered Roman Catholic priest Bernard Darke because he was on the staff of a religious opposition newspaper, the Catholic Standard. The House of Israel also engaged in strikebreaking activities and disruptions of public meetings.

Critics of the government alleged that House of Israel members acted with impunity during the government of Forbes Burnham. However, under Desmond Hoyte, Burnham's successor, Rabbi Washington and key associates were arrested on a long-standing manslaughter charge for the death of James Maion, a former member of the House of Israel, and sentenced to 15 years in 1986. Hill was released in 1992, and extradited to the United States. Hill died on 11 December 2005.

At the 2014 Walter Rodney inquiry, Joseph Hamilton, former priest of the House of Israel, testified that the House of Israel committed “oppressive and terrorizing acts on behalf of the PNC.” It was also revealed that the murderer of Walter Rodney was a member of the House of Israel.
