= Banking in Guyana =

Banking in Guyana follows the country's tumultuous economics history, from formal introduction under British rule, the socialist-oriented nationalization of banks at independence, to IMF sponsored open-market initiatives. The banking industry faces increased pressure to meet global standards domestically, as well as attract international investors, and serve the large number of diaspora that remain economically tied to the country.

== History ==
=== Colonial beginnings ===
Early domestic economics relied predominantly on bartering and an enslaved workforce. Formal banking services for the colonial Europeans was done in Europe and maintained from abroad. Among the slave and laboring classes, financing was made through informal banking systems and cooperatives, which still function as a means for financing to this day. The first domestic financial institution was Savings Bank, founded in 1828 for the benefit of slaves who earned money from side jobs and eventually evolved into the Post Office Savings Bank.

Colonial Bank was chartered in 1836 by a consortium of merchants and private bankers in London. British Guiana Bank was also chartered that same year.

British Guiana Bank became Royal Bank of Canada in 1913. In 1925 Colonial Bank merged with two other British banks to become Barclays Bank (Dominion, Colonial and Overseas).

=== Independence and nationalization ===
Guyana's independence from Britain in 1966 had a significant impact on the economy and banking industry. At the time of independence, the banking and financial sector was quite underdeveloped, serving an agriculture-heavy economy that had been tightly regulated by the Colonial Authority. In 1970, the People's National Congress government established the Guyana National Co-operative Bank (GNCB) as a development bank to serve rural and communities. GAIBANK was formed in 1973 as a development bank for agriculture and later merged into GNCB.

In 1984, major foreign banks were nationalized: RBC became National Bank of Industry and Commerce (NBIC), Chase Manhattan Bank became Republic Bank, and Barclays changed to Guyana Bank for Trade and Industry Ltd. (GBTI). Republic Bank was later merged with GBTI. Bank of Baroda and Bank of Nova Scotia opened offices in Guyana after independence and remained foreign-owned during this time.

A parallel economy developed to deal with various economic problems, but was also a major source of inflation and currency instability. According to economist Clive Y. Thomas, the parallel economy of this time was "one-half to roughly the same size as the official economy". A lucrative activity of the black market was trading foreign exchange, which undermined the government's attempts to maintain an over-valued, fixed exchange rate. At one point, the exchange rate for US$1 was G$60 on the black market, compared to the official rate of G$33.

By 1988, the country was deep in recession and had amassed a debt of $500 million.

=== Opening of the markets ===
IMF Economic Recovery Programme initiated broad economic change to the country, shifting from the socialist policies to those of free markets, which led to a rise in GDP in the 90's. The majority of the banking industry was government owned, so new policies were set in place to privatize the industry. The cambio system was initiated to legalize the black market for foreign currency. As of 2020 there are 19 such companies registered with the central bank.

In 1991 the government started selling shares of GBTI, and by 1994 it was entirely privately owned. Republic Bank, headquartered in Trinidad and Tobago, purchased the majority of shares of NBIC to become Republic Bank (Guyana) after recovering rights to the name from GTBI.

In 1994, two new banks were licensed, Citizen's Bank (a Jamaican bank) and Demerara Bank. Demerara Bank was the first private sector indigenous bank, founded by Dr. Yesu Persaud and Mr. Kads Khan a former member of Parliament.

Also in 1994, GBTI introduced the first ATM in Guyana.

The economic growth Guyana had enjoyed began to slow in 1998 due to factors including undeveloped capital markets, limited access to credit, and high emigration of educated individuals leading to brain-drain. These issues as well as previous waves of large-scale emigration have contributed to remittances making up a large portion of the country's GDP. Even though remittances are often critiqued for doing little to improve economies of the recipient country, banks in Guyana use remittances as an opportunity for financial deepening by requiring opening of a savings account before disbursement.

The International Monetary Fund instituted Anti-Money Laundering and Combating the Financing of Terrorism (AML/CFT) policies, which instigated an exodus of correspondent banks from the Caribbean. Threatened by heavy fines for non-compliance, foreign banks started cutting ties to smaller Caribbean banks, impacting money transfers and currency exchange in the region.

Republic Bank acquired Scotiabank in 2019, which increased Republic Bank's share of Guyana's assets and deposits to 51%.

Bank of Baroda announced plans to sell off their Guyana operations, but reversed their decision, possibly due to the discovery of off-shore oil as motivation to stay in the country.

In 2020, Citibank showed interest in starting a presence in Guyana.

== Regulation ==
Bank of Guyana is the central banking authority of the country. It is the sole entity responsible for printing money in Guyana, but prior to its formation in 1965, bank notes were printed by commercial banks as well as the government. Plans for a National Payment System have been devised with the World Bank that will modernize interbank communications.

=== Legal framework ===
- Dealers in Foreign Currency (Licensing) Act 1989
- The Financial Institutions Act 1995
- The Bank of Guyana Act 1998
- Money Transfer Agencies (Licensing) Act 2009
- Anti- Money Laundering and Countering the Financing of Terrorism Act 2009
- Credit Reporting Act 2010
- The Insurance Act 2016
- National Payments System Act 2018
- Deposit Insurance Act 2018

== List of licensed commercial banks ==
- Bank of Baroda (Guyana) Inc.
- Republic Bank (Guyana) Limited
- Bank of Nova Scotia
- Guyana Bank for Trade & Industry Limited
- Citizens Bank Guyana Inc.
- Demerara Bank Limited

== List of licensed non-bank financial institutions ==
- Hand-in-Hand Trust Corporation Inc
- The New Building Society
- Trust Company (Guyana) Ltd
- Secure International Finance Company Inc
- Beharry Stockbrokers Ltd
- Guyana Americas Merchant Bank Inc
