= National Milling Company of Guyana =

Coordinates: 6.777617°N 58.173901°W

- Type: Subsidiary
- Industry: Manufacturing - Food
- Founded: 17 May 1969, 57 years ago
- Headquarters: Georgetown, Guyana
- Area served: Guyana, St. Maarten, Antigua, Barbados, Canada, Suriname and Brazil
- Key people: Mr Roopnarine 'Bert' Sukhai, Managing Director 2006-present
- Products: Wheat flour and flour derivative products
- Production output: 240 metric tons of wheat per day (2019)
- Brands: Maid Marian, Thunderbolt Flour, Life Flour, Speciality Flour
- Number of employees: 136 (2019)
- Parent: Seaboard Corporation
- Website: https://www.namilco.com/

The National Milling Company of Guyana (NAMILCO) is the largest and oldest operating commercial flour mill in the Co-operative Republic of Guyana, having celebrated its 50th anniversary of operations in 2019. The company was established as a subsidiary of the Seaboard Corporation, an international agribusiness conglomerate based in the United States, on 17 May 1969. The mill produces wheat-based products for both the Guyanese consumer and commercial markets alongside local foodstuffs primarily consumed by the Guyanese Indian population, a substantial ethnic group in the country. The factory is located adjacent to East Bank Public Road, Agricola, Georgetown. The National Milling Company of Guyana is headed by Managing Director Mr Roopnarine 'Bert' Sukhai.

== History ==
=== Early history (1969–1998) ===
Prior to 1969, Guyana did not possess the manufacturing capacity to produce flour and was reliant on international imports. Between 1967 and 1969 the American agricultural conglomerate Seaboard Corporation financed the construction of the company’s flour mill site, warehousing and conveyors. This was done in conjunction with Taylor Woodrow & Associates and the Italian milling firm Ocrim SpA. Upon completion, the company was officially opened by then Guyanese Prime Minister Forbes Burnham on May 17, 1969.

Guyana was at the time under the administration of Forbes Burnham, who served as both First Prime Minister and Second President of the country, from 1964 until his death in 1985. His regime, characterised as that of an economically nationalistic strongman, pursued a state-centric development of productive output in the domestic agricultural sector. Political instability in the early post-colonial era contributed to this tendency. Between 1982 and 1988, a policy of import licensing was introduced in which importation of agricultural commodities from foreign markets, among an array of other commodities, was heavily restricted. During this time, the company’s productive output suffered as a result of a major shortage in financing and unrefined wheat flour during a sharp economic contraction in which most of the company’s wheat stock was sourced predominately via the black market.

United States Agency for International Development, a major source of agricultural produce for Guyana

Guyanese agricultural trade with the United States during the economic crisis fell between 1981 and 1983 as per the United States Department of Agriculture (USDA), impacting wheat flour as a major import of Guyanese trade in that period. The value of Guyanese agricultural trade and production itself saw marked declines contemporaneous with a recession according to data from the Food and Agricultural Organization of the United Nations (FAO). In 1986, the United States Department of Agriculture became engaged in the Caribbean region with its acceleration of the Public Law 480 program, which allocated food and agricultural assistance to Guyana under both Title 1 and Title 3 import agreements in order to stymie food shortages and malnutrition. Similar supply arrangements were made with other developing economies in the region; this program is better known as the Food for Peace program, operated by the United States Agency for International Development (USAID) commencing in 1954. NAMILCO was able to restart production with an inflow of imported wheat to Guyana in 1986 after the finalisation of the Public Law 480 agreement and subsequent repealing of the ban on wheat and flour importation. Since then, the entire wheat supply of Guyana has been sourced from the United States on a concessional grant basis under the program.

In 1998, the company began to repackage bulk material into small-scale packaged products under the Maid Marian and Thunderbolt brand lines, the first Guyanese company to do so.

=== Today (1998–present) ===
In 2009, the company was accredited with an ISO 9001:2008 quality management system certification and observed the anniversary of 40 years of operation.

NAMILCO is regularly involved in Guyanese youth sport, actively sponsoring several competitions and teams in football and cricket codes. It is a principle sponsor of the Guyana Football Federation (GFF) and acts as the principle investor in local youth sport in the country. On 19 May 2016, the company entered into a five-year memorandum of understanding partnership with the GFF in an effort to bolster the development of long-term sporting sponsorships and athletic performance in Guyana. The deal signed amounted to G$30,000,000, or approximately US$148,000. The GFF is the highest governing body for football in Guyana, comprising nine affiliated regional member organisations representing football associations at the national level.

In line with the MoU established with the GFF, on 29 April 2016 the company sponsored and launched the ‘GFF/NAMILCO Thunderbolt Flour Power National U-17 Intra-Association League’ with a commencement address delivered by the then Minister of Education Dr Rupert Roopnarine. The league was recommenced for a second season in 2019. In an address officiating the second commencement, the President of the Guyana Football Federation Wayne Forde remarked that the NAMILCO league ‘is the largest financial commitment from any corporate entity to [Guyanese] football’ and that the partnership was the first to host both an officially sanctioned male and female tournament.

In addition to football sponsorships, the company has also supported regional events in track and field, swimming, cycling, cricket, futsal, and has made several donations to schools and universities across the country.

The facilities of the National Milling Company are located on the eastern bank of the Demerara River, the main waterway of the Guyanese capital city Georgetown and primary offloading point for overseas imports received by the company. On 15 February 2018 NAMILCO and three other local companies alongside elements of the Guyanese Police and Emergency Services, the Guyanese Coast Guard, the Marine Police and the Guyana Energy Agency coordinated a live security exercise under the direction of the Guyana Maritime Administration Department, titled 'Exercise Thunderboom'. This exercise was a scenario simulating an unauthorised intrusion of the facilities and the emergency response capacities of the participants. These exercises are required on an annual basis to comply with the safety protocols of the International Ship and Port Facility Security Code (ISPS), the company has been registered as compliant with the ISPS since 2009.

On 26 September 2018, NAMILCO’s parent company the Seaboard Corporation celebrated its 100th anniversary of operation.

The company operates social media accounts on Youtube, Facebook, and Twitter. It has raised the issue of counterfeit packaging of non-NAMILCO flour products in Guyanese markets.

== 50th Anniversary ==
In 2019 the company held celebrations marking 50 years of operation in Guyana, holding several commemorative events with remarks delivered by the United States Deputy Chief of Mission, attended by a number of representatives from Guyanese media, industry, politics and national parliament.

A key component of the 50th anniversary commemorations was a multi-day programme of youth sport competitions held on 26 May 2019, coinciding with the 53rd anniversary of Guyanese Independence. The festival included softball, volleyball, cricket, football, athletics, and relay events hosted by the Rose Hill Town Youth & Sports Club (RHTYSC). NAMILCO has entered into a working partnership with the RHTYSC, on 18 September 2019 the company began directly sponsoring the club’s highest profile cricket squad under the name ‘Rose Hall Town NAMILCO Thunderbolt First Division Team’, also known as the RHT Thunderbolts. The company has also sponsored educational events in conjunction with the RHTYSC with donations of textbooks, equipment, and deferring prize money to local NGOs, religious institutions, and individuals under the ‘Paying it Forward’ program.

On 10 November 2019 an annual 9-a-side football competition was inaugurated in commemoration of the 85th birthday of former Prime Minister Hamilton Green, who served as the chosen successor of Prime Minister Forbes Burnham from 1985-1992. Subsequently serving as mayor of Georgetown, the Guyanese capital city, from 1994-2016. Hamilton Green was removed from power in the 1992 elections, the first genuinely democratic elections in Guyana since 1964. NAMILCO was involved in the organisational efforts of the competition and sponsored the furnishing of the first and third place trophies presented as awards.

On 15 December 2019 NAMILCO sponsored the third-place prize money of the GFF Super 16 Cup in the amount of G$500,000 approximately US$2400.

Following the 2019 Coronavirus outbreak, the company advised against the hoarding of flour by consumers, stating in a release that 'we guarantee you that we have adequate quantities of all Namilco [sic] Thunderbolt and Maid Marian products, providing your normal pattern of buying is maintained'.

== Products ==
The National Milling Company manufactures several lines of agricultural produce, predominately consisting of wheat flour and wheat flour-derived products. The four main brands are as follows: Maid Marian, Thunderbolt Flour, Life Flour, and Supreme Specialties Flour. In addition, the company produces several goods tailored to the large east-Indian demographic of Guyana. The products below are listed on the company's website.

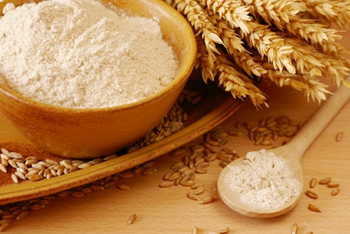
Wheat flour, the staple product of NAMILCO

=== Maid Marian lines ===
==== Maid Marian Health line ====
Products for general consumption and use in cooking

- Maid Marian Harvest High Fibre Whole Wheat Flour
- Maid Marian Multigrain Flour
- Maid Marian Toasted Wheat Germ
- Maid Marian Wheat-Up Breakfast Cereal
- Maid Marian Whole Wheat Flour
- Maid Marian Whole Wheat Flour Mix 45 kg

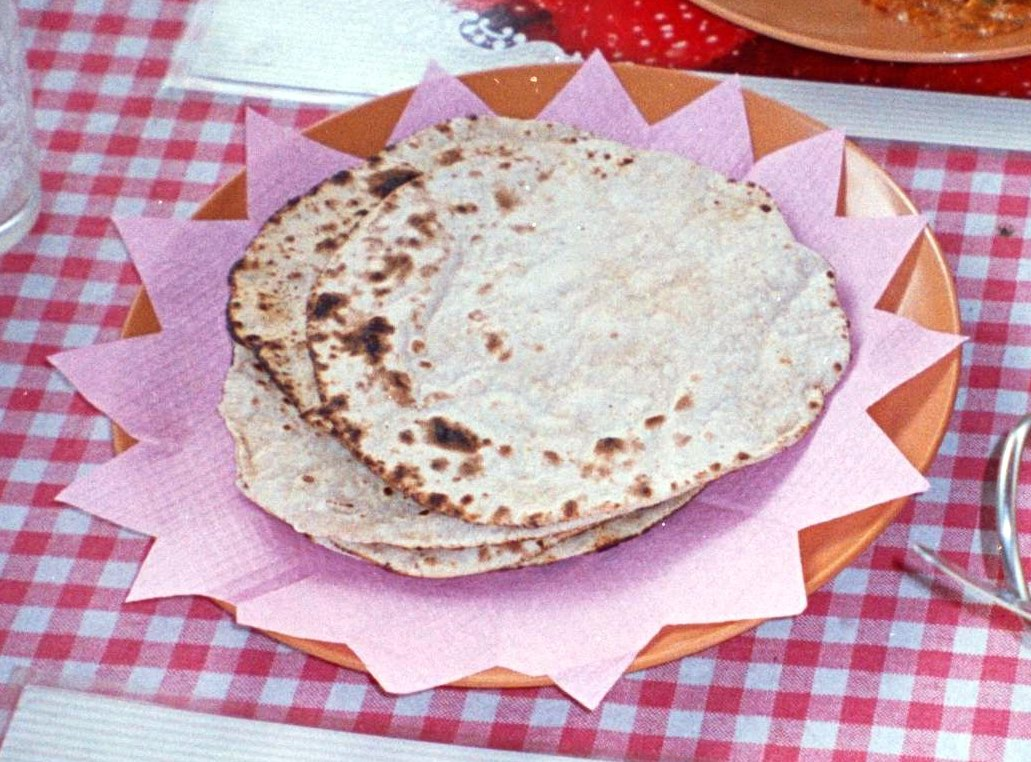
Roti, a type of Indian flatbread

==== Maid Marian Convenience line ====
Snack products and products for specific delicacies

- Maid Marian Creamed Wheat-Up
- Maid Marian Parsad & Halwa (Sirnee) Flour Mix
- Maid Marian Pholourie QuickMix
- Maid Marian Roti Mix
- Maid Marian Self-Rising Flour
- Maid Marian Vanilla Flavoured Cake Flour

=== Flour lines ===
==== Thunderbolt Flour ====
Blended Wheat Flour designed for residential and commercial use

- Thunderbolt All Purpose Flour
- Thunderbolt Bakers Flour 45 kg
- Thunderbolt High Gluten 45 kg

==== Life Flour ====
Flour specifically for cakes and pastries under the Life brand name, made of wheat flour with a low protein content

==== Specialty flours ====
Custom made flour produced with the specifications of individual businesses

- Speciality Supreme Flour
- Speciality KFC Breading Flour
- Speciality Pizza Flour

== Manufacturing ==
The company's manufacturing process begins with the offloading of imported wheat from the United States of America. Said wheat undergoes a process of moisture tempering and cleaning for a maximum of 24 hours, then proceeding on to a size-sorting system in which the tempered grain is crushed and transported to a purification apparatus in which remaining bran and impurities are removed. In total, the production process used by the company comprises four systems: the tempering process, the break system, the purification system, and the flour dressing system. A summary of the NAMILCO flour milling process is available here, as per the company's website.

The resultant flour material is then transported through a reduction system in which finer particulates are sorted and collected, the coarser particles being reintroduced for further treatment and size reduction. In the final milling process, the flour is treated with a substance that oxidises carotene in the material, thus whitening it. In addition, the treatment process fortifies the flour product with vitamins B1, B2, C, Iron and Niacin and serves as a means of bolstering poor rates of public nutrition. This has been done in response to the phenomena of high rates of iron-deficiency anaemia prevalent in predominately rural and developing economies such as Guyana.

== Awards ==
The National Milling Company of Guyana, as the largest and only flour milling firm in the country, plays an active role in the Guyanese agricultural manufacturing sector and has been conferred with several industry accreditations on its staff and manufacturing practices.

The company first attained an International Standards Organisation ISO 9001:2008 Quality Management System Certification on 1 May 2009 2009, its 40th anniversary year, being the first company in Guyana to achieve this accreditation. NAMILCO has maintained several 3-year accreditation periods with annual production process audits conducted by Swiss firm SGS S.A., the company’s current ISO 9001:2015 license is to be reviewed in 2021.

The Guyana National Bureau of Standards (GNBS), an oversight body within the Business Ministry, held its second biennial National Quality Awards (NQA) ceremony on 17 October 2019. The accreditations were for the level of compliance with criteria established by the ISO concerning management, safety, and environmental standards. The bureau conducted audits at 21 participating companies. The National Milling Company collected four awards; winning an award for overall manufacturing, an award for green initiatives in manufacturing, an award for manufacturing health and safety, and an award for customer focus in manufacturing. The NQA program is an initiative introduced by the CARICOM Regional Organisation of Standards and Quality (CROSQ) in 2016. In October 2017 the first biennial NQA ceremony was held in which the National Milling Company was awarded the 'Gold Manufacture Award for Quality' as a Large Business category contender.

Mr Bert Sukhai has served as Managing Director of the company since 2006, having joined the company in 1994. He is the first non-expatriate managing director of the company and has served over 25 years at the firm. On 18 December 2019 he was granted the ‘Presidents Lifetime Award’ by the Guyana Manufacturing and Services Association (GAMSA), the company itself was granted the ‘Presidents Award’ in recognition of its 50th anniversary.
