= Benedict Singh =

Guyanese Roman Catholic bishop (1927–2018)

The Most Reverend Benedict Singh
- Bishop of Georgetown
- Province: Port of Spain
- Diocese: Georgetown
- Installed: 12 August 1972
- Term ended: 10 November 2003
- Predecessor: Richard Lester Guilly
- Successor: Francis Alleyne

Orders
- Ordination: 7 December 1954
- Consecration: 18 April 1971 by Richard Lester Guilly

Personal details
- Born: Benedict Garnesh Singh; 2 December 1927 Buxton, British Guiana
- Died: 12 September 2018 (aged 90) Georgetown, Guyana
- Denomination: Roman Catholic
- Education: Pontifical Urban University

Benedict Garnesh Singh (2 December 1927 – 12 September 2018) was a Guyanese Roman Catholic bishop.

Singh was born in Lusignan, Demerara, Guyana. He obtained his Licentiate in Philosophy from the Pontifical Urban University in Rome in 1951, and his Doctorate in Sacred Theology subsequently from the Pontifical Propaganda College in Rome in 1957 and was ordained to the priesthood in 1954.

He served as titular bishop of Arsennaria and was auxiliary bishop of the Roman Catholic Diocese of Georgetown, Guyana, from 1971 to 1972. He then served as bishop of the diocese from 1972 to 2003. He was the first native born Guyanese bishop.

Singh received the Cacique Crown of Honour in 1993.
