= Guyana Times =

English-language newspaper in Guyana

- The Beacon of Truth
- Front page of Guyana Times on 9 July 2026
- Type: Daily newspaper
- Format: Broadsheet
- Publisher: Guyana Times Inc.
- Editor-in-chief: Tusika Martin
- Founded: 6 June 2008; 18 years ago
- Language: English
- Headquarters: Georgetown, Guyana
- Country: Guyana
- Website: guyanatimesgy.com

Guyana Times is a daily newspaper in Guyana founded in 2008.

== History ==
The Guyana Times was published for the first time on 6 June 2008. An inaugural evening was organised for the occasion.

During an awards ceremony organized at the Windjammer International Hotel by the Guyana Cycling Federation, the Guyana Times was recognised for its coverage of cycling in the country.
