= Military ranks of Guyana =

The Military ranks of Guyana are the military insignia used by the Guyana Defence Force. Guyana shares a rank structure similar to that of the United Kingdom.

== Commissioned officer ranks ==
The rank insignia of commissioned officers.

Rank group	General / flag officers				Senior officers			Junior officers
Guyana Army
Guyana Army	Commander-in-Chief	Minister of Defence	Major general	Brigadier	Colonel	Lieutenant colonel	Major	Captain	Lieutenant	Second lieutenant	Ensign
Guyana Coast Guard
Guyana Coast Guard			Rear admiral	Commodore	Captain	Commander	Lieutenant commander	Lieutenant	Lieutenant junior grade		Sub-lieutenant
Guyana Air Corps
Guyana Air Corps						Lieutenant Colonel	Major	Captain	Lieutenant		Second lieutenant
Rank group	General / flag officers				Senior officers			Junior officers

=== Student officer ranks ===
Rank group	Student officer
Guyana Army
Guyana Army	Officer cadet
Guyana Coast Guard
Guyana Coast Guard	Midshipman

=== Former insignia ===
Rank group	General/flag officers
Army
Army	Lieutenant general	Brigadier general

== Other ranks ==
The rank insignia of non-commissioned officers and enlisted personnel. However, ranks are promoted to the acting rank before they are actually confirm into it.

Rank group	Senior NCOs				Junior NCOs		Enlisted
Guyana Army							No insignia
Guyana Army	Warrant officer class 1	Warrant officer class 2	Staff sergeant	Sergeant	Corporal	Lance corporal	Private (or equivalent)
Guyana Coast Guard
Guyana Coast Guard	Fleet chief petty officer	Chief petty officer	Senior petty officer	Petty officer	Leading seaman		Able seaman
Guyana Air Corps							No insignia
Guyana Air Corps	Warrant officer class 1	Warrant officer class 2	Staff sergeant	Sergeant	Corporal	Lance corporal	Private (or equivalent)
Rank group	Senior NCOs				Junior NCOs		Enlisted
