= Murder of Bernard Darke =

Bernard Darke, a British-born, Guyana-based Jesuit priest and photographer for the Catholic Standard, was stabbed to death on 14 July 1979 by members of the House of Israel, a religious cult that was closely tied to the People's National Congress (PNC), while he was photographing Working People's Alliance demonstrations of the PNC. Guyana's Stabroek News described the murder as "the low point of democracy in Guyana" and, for those in the media, "perhaps the most traumatic event of the [Forbes] Burnham regime."

== Bernard Darke ==
Darke was born in 1925. He attended St Peter's College in Southbourne. Darke served in the Royal Navy in World War II and became a Jesuit in 1946. He was reported to have been involved in scouting and to have developed an interest in photography while in formation at Heythrop. During the 1950s, Darke taught at Wimbledon College. He was ordained in 1958.

Darke went to British Guiana in 1960 and became a lecturer who taught scripture and math at St. Stanislaus College in Georgetown. There, he continued his interests in photography and scouting, where he was scout leader from 1962 to his death.

== Murder ==
Members of the House of Israel pursue Bernard Darke on the morning of 14 July 1979.

In 1979, Darke was a photographer for the Catholic Standard, a tabloid paper that was described as being "extremely critical" of the People's National Congress (PNC). The House of Israel was a cult founded by David Hill, an American fugitive known as Rabbi Edward Washington. Opponents of Forbes Burnham's government said that the House of Israel was a private army for the People's National Congress, and the group was reported to be a "brutal force in street demonstrations." On behalf of the PNC, the House of Israel also engaged in strike breaking activities and the disruption of public meetings.

On 14 July 1979, Walter Rodney and two supporters of his Working People's Alliance were charged with arson for the firebombings of a government and PNC offices three days earlier, which resulted in a violent clash between political factions. During the clash, Darke, a bystander, was stabbed to death by some of the rioters. According to Jesuit author Malachi Martin, Darke was stabbed to death by a faction of Forbes Burnham partisans. He was working part-time as a photographer for the Catholic Standard newspaper of Georgetown, Guyana. According to a 2013 article in Kaieteur News, the target of the assassins may have been Father Andrew Morrison, the newspaper's editor. Kaieteur News describes Morrison and the Catholic Standard in the 1980s as, "fighting against corruption and freedom of the press" that were "muffled" by the Burnham government.

In July 1986, Washington and some of his key associates were charged with the murder of Darke. After pleading guilty to the lesser charge of manslaughter, Washington received a fifteen-year prison sentence.

== Sources ==
- Malcolm Rodrigues SJ. "Bastille Day – Georgetown, 1979". Thinking Faith.
