= Freedom of religion in Guyana =

The Constitution of Guyana provides for freedom of religion.

In 2023, the country was scored 4 out of 4 for religious freedom.

== Religious demography ==
According to the 2012 national census, 64% of the population identify as Christian, 25% as Hindu, and 7% as Muslim (mainly Sunni); 3% have no religion and less than 1% belong to other religious groups including Rastafarians, Baha’is, Afro-descendent Faithists, and Areruya. Among Christians, the largest group are Pentecostals (23%).

The country is ethnically diverse, reflecting East Indian, African, Chinese, and European ancestry, as well as a significant indigenous population. Members of all ethnic groups are well represented in all religious groups, with two exceptions: most Hindus are Indo-Guyanese, and nearly all Rastafarians are Afro-Guyanese. Foreign missionaries from many religious groups are present.

== Status of religious freedom ==
=== Legal/policy framework ===
The law protects the right of individuals to choose and change their religion and to interpret their religious beliefs for themselves. The constitution mandates the Ethnic Relations Commission (ERC) to promote ethnic and religious harmony; the ERC includes representatives of the country's main religious traditions, including Christianity, Hinduism and Islam.

While the Government recognizes religious groups of all faiths, they must register with the Government to receive formal recognition and tax benefits. The following holy days are national holidays: Eid al-Adha, Holi, Easter and Diwali.

Both public and religiously affiliated schools exist, and parents are free to send their children to the school of their choice without sanction or restriction, although in the past the AFC-ANUP administration has imposed an 18% VAT/tax on students that choose to attend private school. All students attending private religious schools must participate in religious education, regardless of a student's religious beliefs. In the past, Christianity was the only religion being practised in schools, and children are asked to recite Christian prayers at least four times per day.

=== Restrictions on religious freedom ===
In 2022 authorities arrested members of the Rastafarian community during the year for possession of 15 grams (.53 ounces) or more of marijuana; Rastafarians saw this as infringing on their religious practices. At the end of 2022 the government passed a bill to remove prison time for possession of up to 30 grams (1.06 ounces) of marijuana and to remove the fine for smoking or otherwise using cannabis.

In the past, the Guyana Defence Force (GDF) has made efforts to coordinate with civilian religious groups to provide personnel with access to religious services. Leaders of all major religious groups provided prayer and counselling, although generally only Christian sermons were given on GDF bases. Although no official GDF policy requires attendance at religious services, anecdotal evidence from GDF officers suggests that individual commanders required attendance at some religious programs. Membership in a particular religion did not confer any advantage or disadvantage; however, general military practice tended to be biased in favour of Christians.

The Inter-Religious Organization of Guyana (IROG) conducts interfaith events including World Interfaith Harmony Week.

=== The Church of Jesus Christ of Latter-day Saints ===
In September 2009, forty mainly U.S. citizen missionaries from the Church of Jesus Christ of Latter-day Saints were detained briefly. Subsequently, the 100+ missionaries were ordered to leave the country within a month. In addition to its missionary work, The Church of Jesus Christ of Latter-day Saints owns approximately $2 million in property in Guyana. Missionaries have worked in the country for more than 20 years.

In 2021, there were 12 branches of the church in Guyana, with over 6,500 members.
