= Guyana Chronicle =

Guyanese newspaper

- Type: Daily newspaper
- Format: Broadsheet
- Owner: Government of Guyana
- Publisher: Guyana National Newspapers Limited
- Founded: 1880; 146 years ago
- Language: English
- Headquarters: Lama Avenue, Georgetown, Guyana
- OCLC number: 29013105
- Website: guyanachronicle.com

Guyana Chronicle is a state-owned daily newspaper in Guyana published by Guyana National Newspapers Limited (GNNL) under the direction of the Department of Public Information. It is published in Georgetown on Lama Avenue and is one of the country's primary daily newspapers alongside Stabroek News.

== History ==
The publication was originally launched in 1880 under the name The Chronicle. It was renamed Guyana Chronicle during the 1970s and began publishing under Guyana National Newspaper Ltd. in 1975. Following a declaration by President Forbes Burnham in 1974, management of the newspaper was assumed by state-controlled Guyana National Newspapers Limited under a policy of "development communication within the paramountcy of party".

According to reports by the Commonwealth Observer Group, the newspaper and its sister publication, the Sunday Chronicle, have historically maintained an editorial stance supportive of the ruling government and the PPP/C, highlighting socioeconomic achievements. During the 1980s and 1990s, former prime minister and opposition leader Cheddi Jagan criticized the publication for acting as an instrument of the administration.

In addition to its daily print distribution, the newspaper maintains an online presence where news items are published digitally ahead of street release.

== See also ==
- List of newspapers in Guyana
