= Guyana Defence Force =

Military forces of Guyana

- Emblem of the Guyana Defence Force

- Flag of the Guyana Defence Force
- Motto: "SERVICE"
- Founded: 1 November 1965 (61 years, 8 days)
- Service branches: Army; Air Corps; Coast Guard
- Headquarters: Defence Headquarters, Base Camp Ayanganna, Thomas Lands, Georgetown
- Website: Official website

Leadership
- Commander-in-Chief: Dr. Mohamed Irfaan Ali
- Prime Minister: Brigadier (Ret’d) Mark Phillips, MSS
- Minister of Home Affairs: Oneidge Walrond
- Chief of Defence Staff: Brigadier Omar Khan, MSS

Personnel
- Military age: 17.75
- Conscription: No
- Active personnel: 3,400 (2023)
- Reserve personnel: 670 (2023)

Expenditure
- Budget: GY$42.2 billion (2024)
- Percent of GDP: 0.9% (2024)

Industry
- Foreign suppliers: Belgium; Brazil; China; France; Germany; India; Italy; Soviet Union; United Kingdom; United States

Related articles
- History: Rupununi Uprising; Operation Uphold Democracy; Guyana–Venezuela crisis (2023–2024)
- Ranks: Military ranks of Guyana

The Guyana Defence Force (GDF) is the armed forces of Guyana, established in 1965. It has military bases across the nation. The Commander-in-Chief of the Defence Force is always the incumbent President of Guyana. Service Branches include the Army, Air Corps, and Coast Guard.

Although a small nation, Guyana's recent petro wealth has destabilized the region, re-igniting border disputes with Venezuela inherited from the colonial era.

== History ==
The nation of Guyana became independent in the 1960s, before that defense was the responsibility of the United Kingdom. A small country with a modest defense force, Guyana is supported by alliances with major regional players including the United States, the United Kingdom, and Brazil. Guyanese forces participated in the multinational 1994 mission to Haiti.

=== Twentieth century ===
The GDF was formed on 1 November 1965. Members of the new Defence Force were drawn from the British Guiana Volunteer Force (BGVF), Special Service Unit (SSU), British Guiana Police Force (BGPF) and civilians. Training assistance was provided by British instructors.

A survey party sent by the Surinamese government, which at the time was still under Dutch colonial rule, was sent to the Tigri Area in late 1967 as part of Suriname's "Operation Grasshopper", prompting the GDF to confiscate their weapons and expel them from the territory on December 12.

On January 2, 1969, the Rupununi uprising by native Pemon and Wapishana led by Valerie Hart, with reported support from Venezuela, began with an attack against Lethem, the capital of the Upper Takutu-Upper Essequibo region, resulting in the deaths of five police officers and two civilians and the destruction of Guyanese government buildings. The rebels locked townsfolk in their homes, blocked airstrips in the area, and took Guyanese government officials into their custody. Guyanese forces mobilized from the nearest unblocked airstrip and in two days the insurrection was quelled, with many rebels fleeing into Venezuela and Brazil, with Hart fleeing to the former. Accusations of massacres by Guyanese forces of native Amerindians have been put forth, which the Guyanese government denied and the Guyanese government accused the rebels of being backed by Venezuela and attempting to cede themselves to Venezuela.

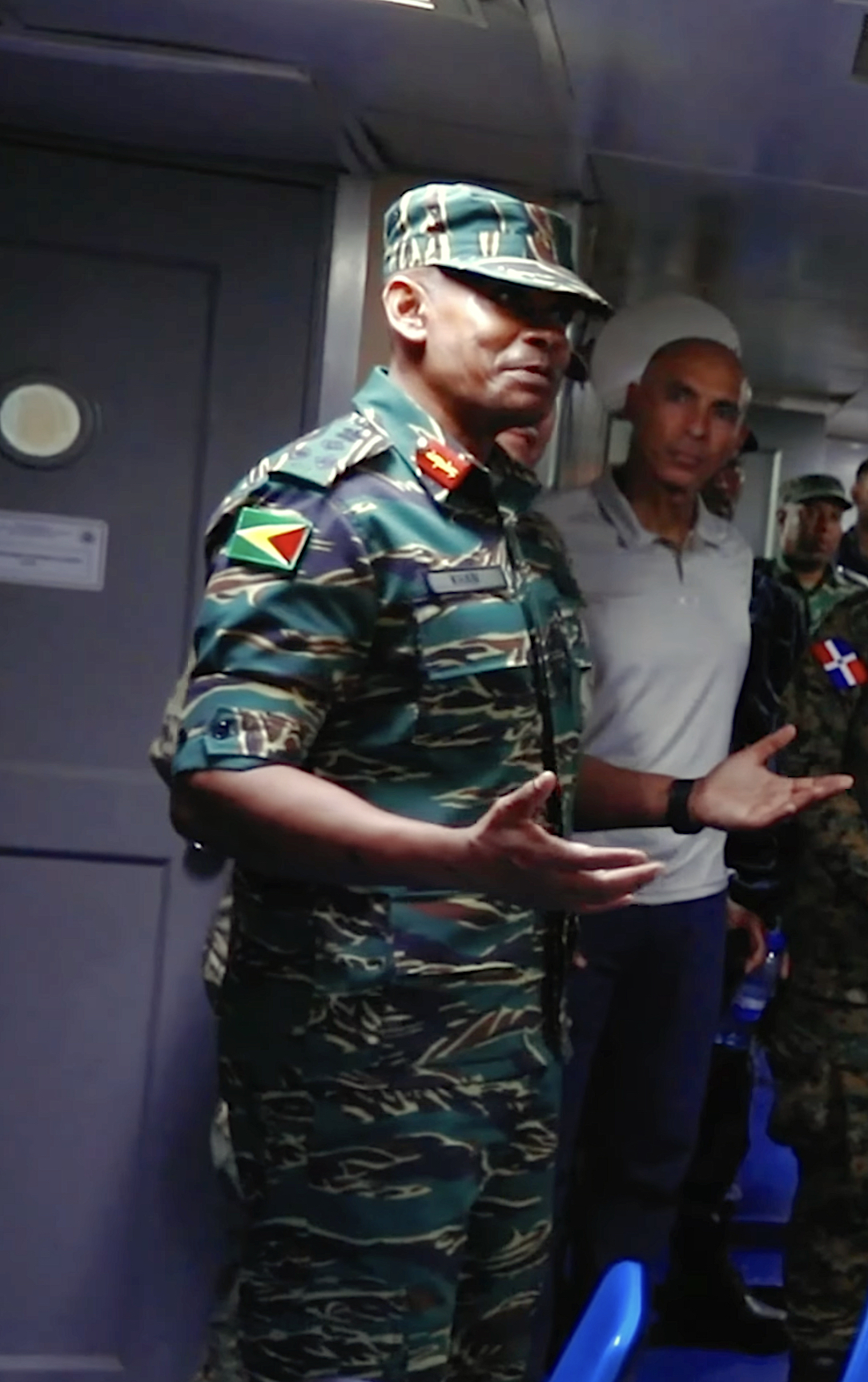
Omar Khan, Chief of Staff of the GDF

In mid–August 1969, patrolling GDF forces discovered a Surinamese camp and partially completed airstrip in the Tigri Area. This discovery prompted the GDF to launch an operation on August 19, 1969 against the camp and airstrip, resulting in the expulsion of Surinamese forces from the area.

A platoon of GDF soldiers, part of a contingent of Caribbean Community troops, were involved in the 1994 US-led intervention Operation Uphold Democracy in Haiti.

=== Twenty-first century ===
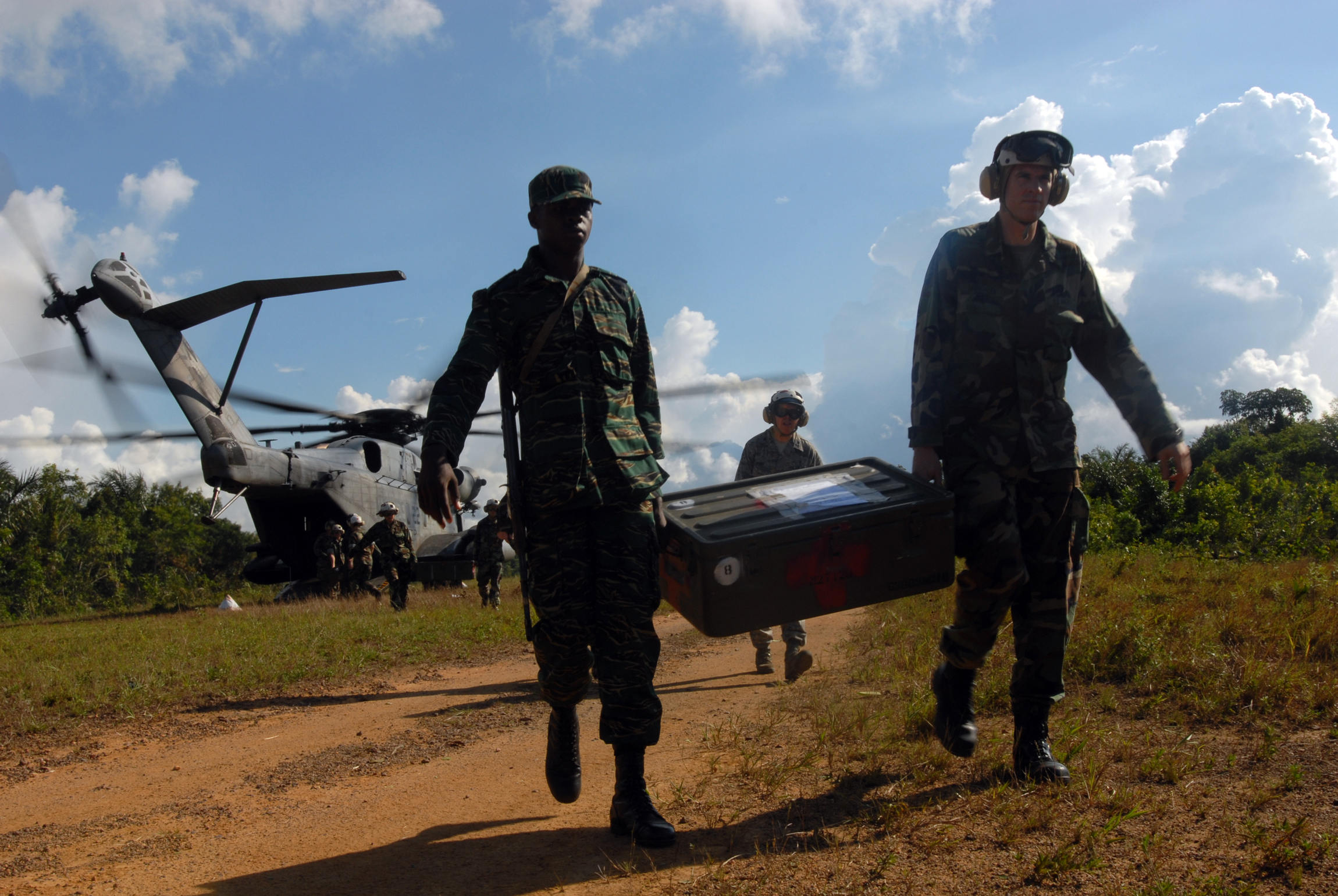
Guyanese Defense Force unload supplies from a helicopter with international partners, as part of the mission Continuing Promise in 2008

On 28 November 2023, the U.S. Embassy in Guyana announced that the United States military (1st SFAB) and the Guyana Defence Force would strengthen their military partnership. This occurred during the 2023 Guyana–Venezuela crisis when its neighboring country, Venezuela, announced the annexation of the majority of Guyana's western territories via the 2023 Venezuelan referendum. The GDF is multiple factors smaller than the National Bolivarian Armed Forces of Venezuela and would have great difficulty defending itself from Venezuela without foreign support.

In the 2020s a major shift took place, the percent of GDP of defense decreased but there was a big increase in overall budget due to changes GDP. From 1990 to 2020, non-inflation adjusted currency the defense increased went from 142 thousand to 16 billion.

In early 2024, a plan was announced to procure more helicopters, a maritime defense vessel, and a drone.

== Roles and functions ==
Guyanese soldier at the Colombian National Training Center

Three main roles exist for the GDF:

- Defend the territorial integrity of Guyana.
- Assist the civil power in the maintenance of law and order when required to do so.
- Contribute to the economic development of Guyana.

The GDF is an integral part of the Guyanese nation. Resources and equipment of the GDF are used to help other Guyanese; examples include medical mercy flights and the construction of roads and airstrips by the Engineering Corps.

Enlistment into the force is voluntary for officers and soldiers. Basic training is done within GDF training schools, which has also trained officers and soldiers from Commonwealth Caribbean territories. However, officers are trained at one of two British officer training schools: Royal Military Academy Sandhurst (Infantry Training) and Britannia Royal Naval College (Coast Guard Training).

The training and skills gained by the members of the GDF have been used when they move either into civilian life or into the sister military organizations, the Guyana National Reserve (now the Second Infantry Battalion Group Reserve) and formerly the Guyana National Service (disbanded in 2000) and the Guyana People's Militia.

== Organization ==
Flag of the GDF Coast Guard

Flag of the GDF Air Corps

- 1st Infantry Battalion Group
- 3rd Infantry Battalion
- 2nd Infantry Battalion Group Reserve (formerly the Guyana People's Militia)
- 31 Special Forces Squadron
- 21st Artillery Company
- Engineer Battalion
- Signals Corps
- Defence Headquarters
- Training Corps
- Intelligence Corps
- Coast Guard
- Band Corps
- Medical Corps
- Air Corps

=== 1st Infantry Battalion Group ===
In the 1980s, the Guyana Defence Force manned the Amawai, Roraima, Ireng, and Takutu sectors, while the Kutari Sector was manned by the then Guyana National Service. In 1988, these GDF battalions were merged to create the 1st Infantry Battalion, later known as the 1st Infantry Battalion Group. At that time, the Force had more resources, including human, financial, and materiel, compared to its current state. However, today, the amalgamated battalion faces significant challenges as it is now required to carry out the tasks previously handled by multiple units. This poses a considerable challenge, especially given the changing dynamics in the global environment, which are impacting the nation's security.

=== 31 Special Forces Squadron ===
The 31 Special Forces Squadron is a special forces group that is specialized in airborne, jungle and river warfare operations.

=== GDF Band Corps ===
The Guyana Defence Force Band Corps is the official musical unit of the GDF whose role is to provide musical accompaniment for ceremonial functions of the GDF. The members were drawn from the Rifle Companies and the defunct Volunteer Force and were brought out during regimental military parades. The Guyana Defence Force Steel Band would soon follow the main band's lead after its own establishment in 1970, three years after the original band was founded.

=== Medical Corps ===
The Medical Corps provides medical and dental care to all the members of the GDF and their immediate families. It often liaises with the Health ministry for medical procedures and protocol to be carried out effectively. The corps is situated in Base Camp Ayanganna which includes facilities such as a medical laboratory and a dental lab.

== Equipment ==
Much of the equipment belonging to Guyana are Cold War era weapons, with some World War II armaments still supplied. Guyana is a member of the Caribbean Basin Security Initiative. It maintains strong military relations with Brazil, with which it collaborates on border security through yearly regional military exchange gatherings. Moreover, the nation has bilateral pacts with China, France, and the USA. The GDF engages in regular training and participates in bilateral activities. Equipment is mostly composed of ex-Soviet and British weapons and vehicles. The air force has enhanced its limited air-transport capabilities with second-hand aircraft primarily from Brazilian and North American origins. With the exception of maintenance facilities, a defence-industrial sector does not exist.

=== Armoured fighting vehicles ===
| Model | Image | Origin | Quantity | Details |
Reconnaissance
| EE-9 Cascavel | | Brazil | ~6 | only reported. |
| EE-11 Urutu | | Brazil | 24 | MkIII variant, unknown if functional |

=== Armoured transport vehicles ===
| Model | Image | Origin | Quantity | Details |
|---|---|---|---|---|
| Shorland S52 | | United Kingdom | 5 | |

=== Artillery ===
| Model | Image | Origin | Calibre | Quantity | Details |
Towed
| M-46 | | Soviet Union | 130mm | ~6 | |
Multiple rocket systems
| Type 63 | | China | 107mm | 6 | |
Mortars
| L16A1 | | United Kingdom | 81mm | ~12 | |
| M-43 | | Soviet Union | 82mm | ~18 | |
| M-43 | | Soviet Union | 120mm | ~18 | |
| M119 | | United States | 105mm | 8 | In poor condition |

=== Patrol and coastal combatants ===
| Model | Image | Origin | Variant | Quantity | Acquired | Details |
PCO
| GDFS Essequibo | Shown during her service in the British Royal Navy as HMS Orwell | United Kingdom | River-class minesweeper | ~1 | 2001 | Decommissioned in June 2025. |
Patrol boats
| Barracuda | Djiboutian ship of same make shown | United States | 44-foot motor lifeboat | ~4 | 2001 | ex-US Type-44. |
| GDFS 1033 (GDFS Peregrine) & GDFS 1034 | GDFS Peregrine | United States | 38 Defiant-class patrol vessels | 2 | 2017 | Commissioned in March 2017. |
| GDFS Shahoud | Shown in front of US cruiser USS Normandy | United States | 115 Defiant-class patrol vessels | 1 | 2024 | Commissioned in June 2024. |

=== Small arms ===
| Name | Image | Caliber | Type | Origin | Notes |
Pistols
| Walther PPK | | .32 ACP | Semi-automatic pistol | Germany | Retired |
| Glock 17 | | 9mm | Semi-automatic pistol | United States | |
Submachine guns
| Sten | | 9×19mm | Submachine gun | United Kingdom | Retired |
| Sterling | | 9×19mm | Submachine gun | United Kingdom | Retired |
| Heckler & Koch UMP | | 9×19mm | Submachine gun | Germany | |
Rifles
| SKS | | 7.62×39mm | Semi-automatic rifle | Soviet Union | |
| AKM | | 7.62×39mm | Assault rifle | Soviet Union | |
| Type 63 | | 7.62×39mm | Assault rifle | China | |
| Type 56 | | 7.62×39mm | Assault rifle | China | |
| M16 | | 5.56×45mm | Assault rifle | United States | |
| FAMAS | | 5.56×45mm | Assault rifle | France | |
| Heckler & Koch G36 | | 5.56×45mm | Assault rifle | Germany | |
| FN FAL | | 7.62×51mm | Battle rifle | Belgium | |
| Heckler & Koch G3 | | 7.62×51mm | Battle rifle | West Germany | |
Machine guns
| Bren | | 7.62×51mm | Light machine gun | United Kingdom | |
| FN Minimi | | 5.56×45mm | Light machine gun | Belgium | |
| FN MAG | | 7.62×51mm | General-purpose machine gun | Belgium | |
| AA-52 | | 7.62×51mm | General-purpose machine gun | France | |
Surface-to-air missiles
| 9K32 Strela-2 | | 72mm | Surface-to-air missile | Soviet Union | 18 |
Rocket propelled grenade launchers
| RPG-7 | | 40mm | Rocket-propelled grenade | Soviet Union | |

== Aircraft inventory ==
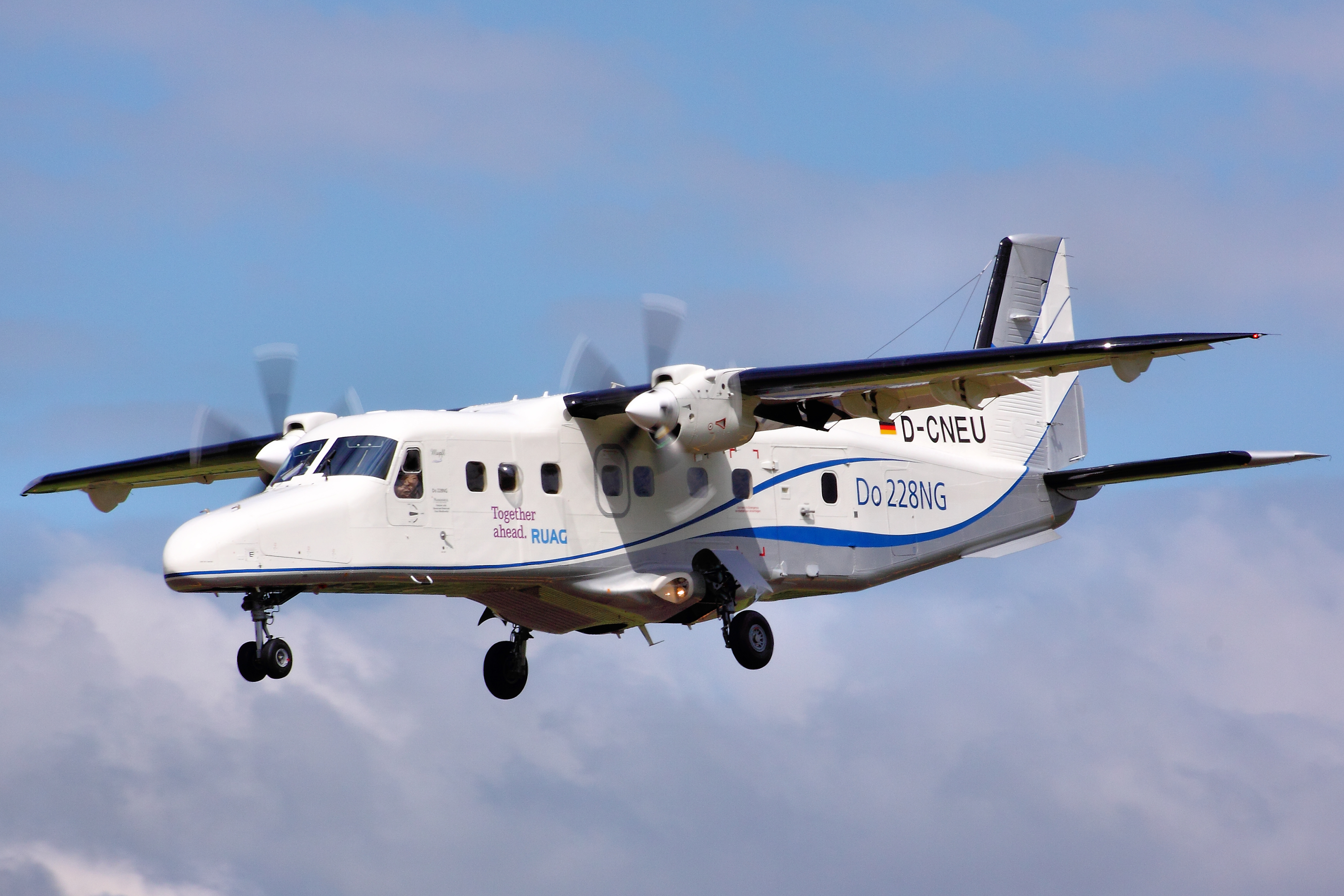
Two new Dornier-HAL 228 were delivered in 2024 from India (type of aircraft pictured).

The Defence force air wing was formed in 1968 and was then renamed the Guyana Defence force air command in 1973. Seven Britten-Norman BN-2A Islander were delivered over a five-year period in the 1970s and then were supplemented by Short Skyvans series 3Ms in 1979. In 1986 3 Mil Mi-8 were delivered. The GDF currently operates 8 fixed-wing aircraft and 4 helicopters. Recently, the GDF had ordered two Dornier Do-228 aircraft from Indian Manufacturer Hindustan Aeronautics Ltd, which were delivered on 1 April 2024.

In early 2024, a plan was announced to among other things to buy some new helicopters. One crashed in 2023, which, because only a few helicopters are operated represented a significant loss.

=== Current inventory ===
| Aircraft | Origin | Type | Variant | In service | Notes |
Transport
| Cessna 206 | United States | Utility | | 1 | |
| Dornier HAL 228 | India | Utility | 228-201 | 2 | Delivery aboard IAF C-17 aircraft. Commissioned November 2024. |
| Short Skyvan | United Kingdom | Utility | SC.7 | 2 | Acquired June, 2019. |
| Britten-Norman Islander | United Kingdom | SAR, Transport, Observation, Surveillance. | BN-2 | 2 | Commissioned August 2018. |
| Super King Air B300 | United States | VIP transport | 350 | 1 | Commissioned July 2023. |
| Tecnam P2012 | Italy | Utility | STOL | 1 | Commissioned July 2025. |
| Harbin Y-12 | China | Utility | | 1 | |
Helicopters
| Bell 206 | United States | Utility | | 1 | |
| Bell 412 | United States | Utility | EPi | 1 | Commissioned March 2021. |
| Bell 407 | United States | Utility | | 1 | Commissioned December 2025. |
| Bell 429 GlobalRanger | United States | Utility | | 1 | Commissioned December 2025. |
UAVs
| Skyfront Perimeter | United States | Surveillance | 8 | 5 | Acquired 2019. |

=== Retired aircraft ===
Previous notable aircraft operated by the Air Corps were the Cessna 182, Cessna 206, Embraer EMB 110, Helio Courier, Aérospatiale Alouette III, Bell 212, and the Mil Mi-8.

== Coast Guard ==
The maritime branch was founded January 9, 1967, with the Guyanese Coast Guard founded in 1990, before this they were called the Buccaneers. Various light vessels were built or used through the 1970s and 80s, especially for customs, maritime, fisheries, and river patrol.

- Metal Shark Boats patrol boats — (5) 28-foot Relentless, and (2) 38-foot Defiant. The first three of the aluminum-hulled 28-foot boats were donated by the United States in March 2014. In March 2017, two of the 38-foot boats were acquired.
- Metal Shark Boats offshore patrol vessel — one on order, scheduled for delivery in 2022.
