= Diocese of Georgetown =

Roman Catholic diocese in Guyana

Coordinates: 6°48′26″N 58°09′43″W

Diocese of Georgetown Dioecesis Georgiopolitana

Catholic

Location
- Country: Guyana
- Ecclesiastical province: Port of Spain
- Metropolitan: Port of Spain

Statistics
- Area: 214,887 km^{2} (82,968 sq mi)
- Population: Total; Catholics: (as of 2013); 796,000; 62,700 (7.9%)
- Parishes: 24

Information
- Denomination: Roman Catholic
- Rite: Latin Rite
- Established: 12 April 1837 (189 years ago)
- Cathedral: Cathedral of the Immaculate Conception

Current leadership
- Pope: Leo XIV
- Bishop: Francis Dean Alleyne

Website
- Website of the Diocese

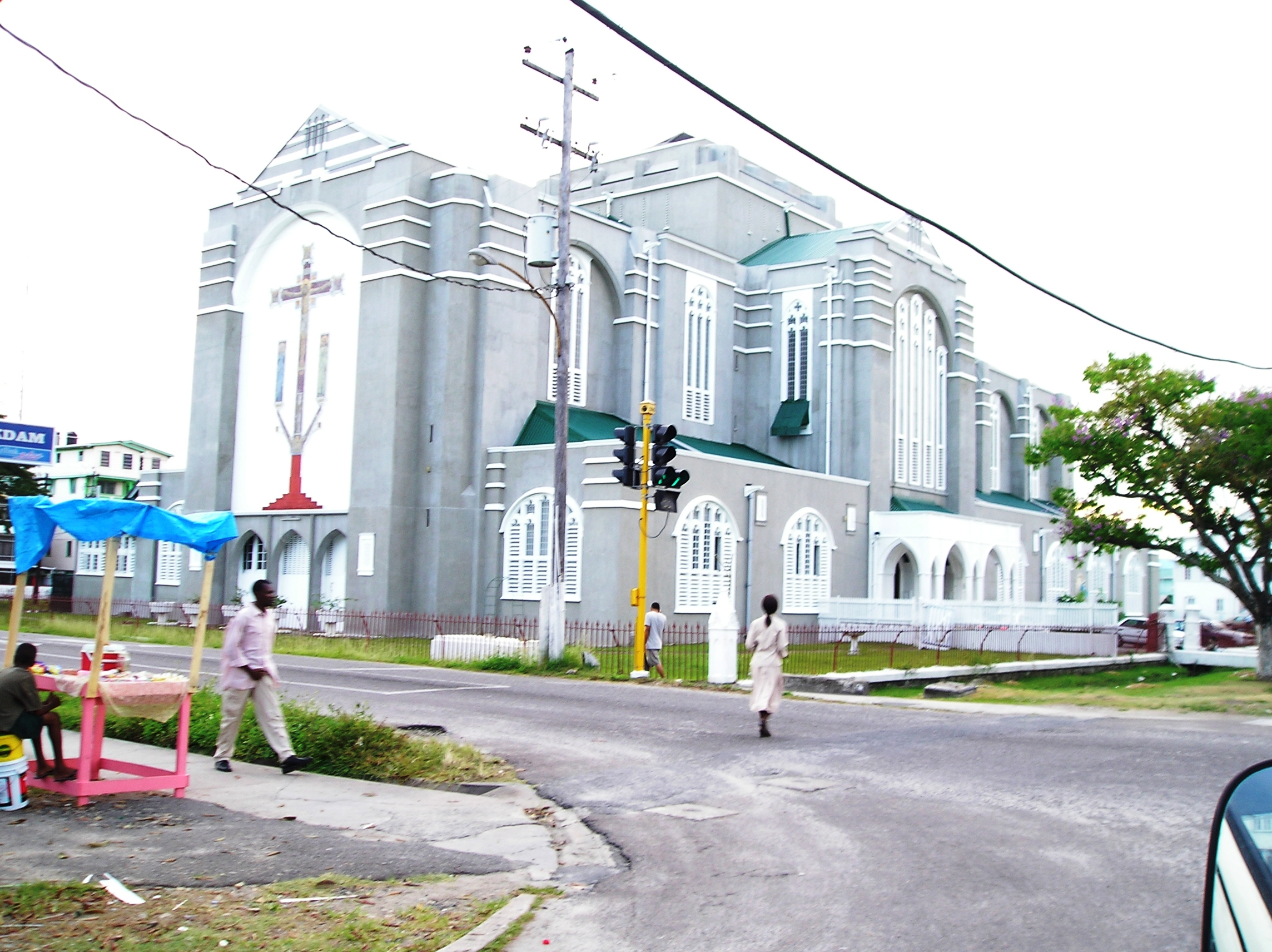
Catholic Cathedral of Immaculate Conception (or Brickdam Cathedral) in Georgetown, Guyana

The Roman Catholic Diocese of Georgetown (Latin: Dioecesis Georgiopolitana) (erected 12 April 1837, as the Vicariate Apostolic of British Guiana) is a suffragan of the Archdiocese of Port of Spain. It was elevated to the Diocese of Georgetown on 29 February 1956. The diocese's cathedral, the Cathedral of the Immaculate Conception, is located in Georgetown, Guyana.

== Bishops ==
=== Ordinaries ===
- William Clancy (1837 - 1843)
- John Thomas Hynes, O.P. (1846 - 1858)
- James Etheridge, S.J. (1858 - 1877)
- Anthony Butler, S.J. (1878 - 1901)
- Compton Theodore Galton, S.J. (1902 - 1931)
- George Weld, S.J. (1932 - 1954)
- Richard Lester Guilly, S.J. (1956 - 1972)
- Benedict Ganesh Singh (1972 - 2003)
- Francis Dean Alleyne, O.S.B. (2003 - )

=== Auxiliary bishop ===
- Benedict Ganesh Singh (1971 - 1972), appointed Bishop here

=== Other priest of this diocese who became bishop ===
- John Derek Persaud, appointed Bishop of Mandeville, Jamaica in 2020
