= Kaieteur News =

- Type: Daily newspaper
- Format: Tabloid
- Headquarters: 24 Saffon Street, Charlestown, Georgetown, Guyana
- Website: kaieteurnewsonline.com

Kaieteur News is a privately owned daily newspaper published in Guyana. Kaieteur News columnists include Freddie Kissoon, Stella Ramsaroop, Adam Harris, and an anonymous columnist who goes by the nom de plume "Peeping Tom".

== History ==
Kaieteur News was founded on April 4, 1994. According to Freddie Kissoon, a former columnist at the Stabroek News, Kaieteur News established itself within a few years as a competitor to the Stabroek News in Guyana.
