= List of countries by proven oil reserves =

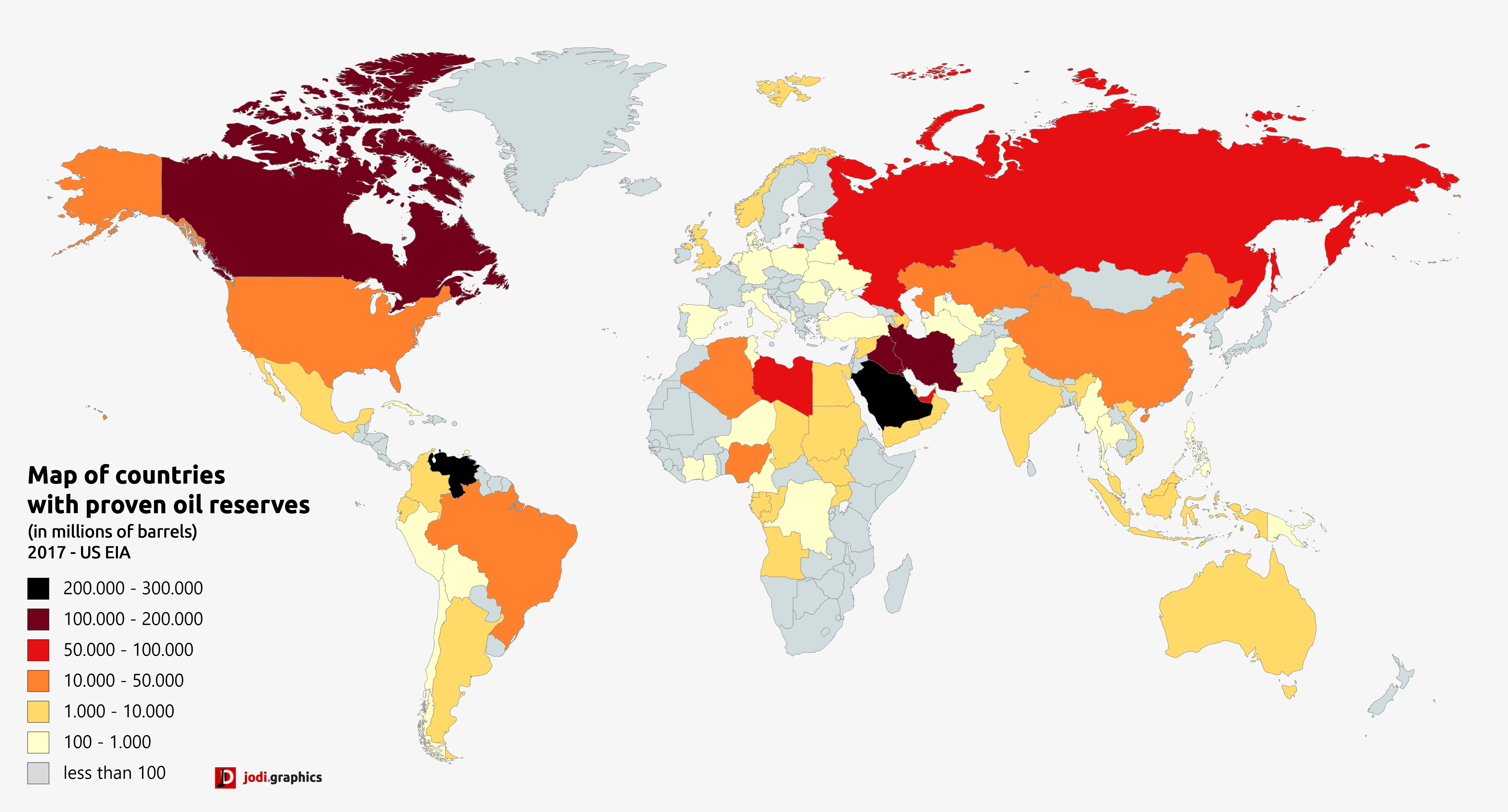
Map of countries with proven oil reserves – according to US EIA (start of 2017)

Venezuela and Middle Eastern countries are estimated in 2024 to have the largest proven oil reserves.

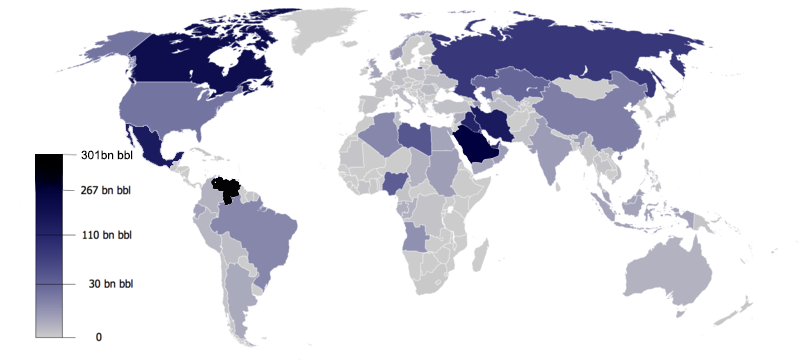
A map of world oil reserves according to OPEC, January 2014

Proven oil reserves are those quantities of petroleum which, by analysis of geological and engineering data, can be estimated with a high degree of confidence to be commercially recoverable from a given date forward from known reservoirs and under current economic conditions.

Some statistics on this page are disputed and controversial — different sources (like OPEC, CIA World Factbook and oil companies) give different figures. Some of the differences reflect the different types of oil included. Different estimates may or may not include oil shale, mined oil sands, or natural gas liquids.

Because proven reserves include oil recoverable under current economic conditions, nations may see large increases in proven reserves when known, but previously uneconomic deposits become economic to develop. In this way, Canada's proven reserves increased suddenly in 2003 when the oil sands of Alberta were seen to be economically viable. Similarly, Venezuela's proven reserves jumped in the late 2000s when the heavy oil of the Orinoco Belt was judged economic.

== Sources ==
Sources sometimes differ on the volume of proven oil reserves. The differences sometimes result from different classes of oil included and sometimes result from different definitions of proven. (The data below does not seem to include shale oil and other unconventional sources of oil such as tar sands. For instance, North America has over 3 trillion barrels of shale oil reserves, and the majority of oil produced in the US is from shale, leading to the paradoxical data below that the US will finish all its oil at 2024 production levels in 10 years.)

Comparison of proven oil reserves from some widely used sources (billions of barrels, 2021)
Source	Canada	Iran	Iraq	Russia	Saudi Arabia	United States	Venezuela
BP	168.1	157.8	145.0	107.8	297.5	68.8	303.8
Eni	168.1	208.6	145.0	107.8	258.5	54.6	303.8
OPEC	5.0	208.6	145.0	80.0	267.2	38.8	303.5
US CIA	170.3	208.6	145.0	80.0	258.6	38.2	303.8
US EIA	168.1	208.6	145.0	80.0	261.6	60.5	303.6

== Countries ==
Reserve amounts are listed in millions of barrels.

Proven reserves (millions of barrels)
Country	U.S. EIA	OPEC (Note: Excludes oil sands)	BP	Eni	Others	Oil production 2025Y (thousands of bbl/day)	Years of production in reserve
Venezuela *(OPEC)	304,000	303,221	303,800	303,806		968 ▲	858
Saudi Arabia *(OPEC)	267,000	267,200	297,500	258,481		9,556 ▲	77
Iran *(OPEC)	209,000	208,600	157,800	208,600		4,194 ▲	136
Canada *	170,000	4,344	168,100	168,088	163,000	4,964 ▲	90
Iraq *(OPEC)	145,000	145,019	145,000	145,019	147,000	4,388 ▼	90
United Arab Emirates *	113,000	113,000	97,800	97,800		3,833 ▲	81
Kuwait *(OPEC)	102,000	101,500	101,500	101,500		2,585 ▲	108
Russia *(OPEC+)	58,000	80,000	107,800	107,804	80,000	9,877 ▼	22
Libya *(OPEC)	50,000	48,363	48,400	48,363	42,000	1,363 ▲	97
United States *	74,000	45,014	68,800	54,644	46,422	13,586 ▲	9
Nigeria *(OPEC)	37,000	37,280	36,900	37,695		1,605 ▲	64
Kazakhstan *(OPEC+)	30,000	30,000	30,000	29,921		2,047 ▲	40
China *	26,000	28,182	26,000	25,963		4,325 ▲	18
Qatar *	25,000	25,244	25,200	25,244		1,312 ▲	53
Somalia *					20,000	—N/a	
Sierra Leone *				440	20,000-15,000	—N/a	
Brazil *(OPEC+)	13,000	15,894	11,900	11,937	16,848	3,769 ▲	12
Algeria *(OPEC)	12,000	12,200	12,200	12,200		1,143 ▲	29
Guyana *	11,000				11,000	747 ▲	40
Ecuador	8,300	8,273	1,300	8,273		441 ▼	51
Azerbaijan *(OPEC+)	7,000	7,000	7,000	6,978		561 ▼	34
Norway *	7,000	6,912	7,900	7,898	8,120	1,859 ▲	10
Mexico *(OPEC+)	6,000	5,136	6,100	7,010	9,700	1,726 ▼	8
Oman *(OPEC+)	5,400	4,971	5,400	5,358		1,002 ▲	14
India *	4,840	4,918	4,500	4,293	4,409	581 ▼	23
Vietnam *	4,400	4,400	4,400	4,391		165 ▲	73
South Sudan * (OPEC+)	3,800	3,500	3,500	3,500	3,500	113 ▲	85
Egypt *	3,300	3,300	3,100	3,146	3,300	510 ▼	18
Yemen *	3,000		3,000	2,881		15	548
Argentina *	3,000	2,999	2,500	2,483		794 ▲	10
Malaysia *(OPEC+)	3,600	2,700	2,700	4,727	5,542	516 ▲	14
Angola *	2,600	2,550	7,800	7,783	9,000	1,031 ▼	7
Syria *	2,500		2,500	2,661		75 ▲	91
Uganda *	2,500			1,004		—N/a	
Indonesia *	2,500	2,410	2,400	2,480	3,497	582	11
Suriname *	2,400			87		12 ▼	548
Colombia *	1,800	2,019	2,000	1,843	2,020	746 ▼	7
Gabon *(OPEC)	2,000	2,000	2,000	2,000		239 ▲	23
Congo *(OPEC)	1,800	1,811	2,900	1,660	180	241 ▼	21
Australia *	2,400	1,803	2,400	3,995	4,002	246 ▼	20
United Kingdom *	2,500	1,500	2,500	2,700	2,618	616 ▲	7
Chad *	1,500		1,500	1,583		126 ▼	33
Sudan *(OPEC+)	1,300	1,500	1,500	185	1,250	30 ▼	137
Turkey *	1,400			365	1350	125 ▲	31
Brunei *(OPEC+)	1,100	1,100	1,100	1,100		101 ▲	30
Equatorial Guinea *(OPEC)	1,100	1,100	1,100	1,100		76 ▼	40
Senegal *					1,030–600	100 ▲	28
Timor-Leste *					719	2	984
Ghana *	700			681	660	183 ▼	10
Turkmenistan *	600	600	600	601		191	9
Romania *	600		600	601		52 ▼	32
Uzbekistan *	600	594	600	594		30 ▼	54
Kenya *	600				585-560	—N/a	
Italy *	500		600	583	595	84 ▼	16
Pakistan *	500			377	236	58 ▼	24
Tunisia *	400		400	403		25 ▼	44
Ukraine *	400	395		487		—N/a	
Peru *	900		700	985	386	44 ▲	24
Denmark *	400	365	400	425	550	73 ▲	14
Thailand *	300		300	293		162 ▲	5
Mongolia *				257	2,438	14	50
Bolivia *	200			574	210	18 ▼	30
Cameroon *	200			247	200	59 ▼	9
Albania *	200			246	150-120	12 ▼	46
Trinidad and Tobago *	200		200	242	830	51	11
Belarus *	200	198		244		26 ▼	21
Papua New Guinea *	200			100	158	32	17
DR Congo *	200			222	180	16 ▼	31
Bahrain *(OPEC+)	200			304	186.5-124.6	176 ▲	2
Spain *	200			185	150	—N/a	
Niger *	200			147	150	101 ▲	4
Chile *	150	150		185	150	2 ▼	205
Philippines *	139			172	138.5	0.5	758
Germany *	100			384	229	32 ▲	9
Netherlands *	100			190	141	21 ▼	13
Cuba *	100			153	124	25 ▼	11
Ivory Coast *	100			119	100	55 ▲	5
Poland *	100			114	151	17	16
Myanmar *	100			62		5.6 ▼	49
Afghanistan *				88		—N/a	
Guatemala *	86			99		5.4 ▼	44
France *	83			125		10 ▼	23
Serbia *	77			96		11 ▼	19
Croatia *	71			90	71	9 ▼	22
Japan *	44			54		3.1	39
New Zealand *	40			66	41	7 ▲	16
Kyrgyzstan *	40			49	40	5.5 ▼	20
Austria *	35			59		8.8 ▼	11
Georgia *	35			43	35	0.2	479
Bangladesh *	28			35		3	26
Mauritania *	20			123	20	—N/a	
Estonia *					16	—N/a	
Czech Republic *	15			19	15	1.3 ▼	32
Bulgaria *	15			19	15	1	41
South Africa *	15			19	15	0.4 ▼	103
Lithuania *	12			15	15.7–12	0.7	54
Hungary *	12			22	35	23 ▲	1
Tajikistan *	12			15	12	0.3	110
Israel *	12			2	12	20 ▲	2
Greece *	10			12	10	1.5	18
Slovakia *	9			11		—N/a	
Benin *	8			10	8	—N/a	
Belize *	6			9	6.7	0.8	23
South Korea *					4.5	—N/a	
Taiwan *	2.4			2		0.2	33
Barbados *	1			2		1	3
Jordan *	1			1	1	—N/a	
Morocco *	1			1	0.684	—N/a	
Mozambique *	0			15	15	—N/a	
World	1,720,000	1,566,869	1,732,400	1,740,264		84,568	~51

* indicates links to "Oil reserves in Country or Territory" or "Energy in Country or Territory" pages.

== See also ==
- List of countries by oil extraction
- List of countries by oil consumption
- List of countries by natural gas proven reserves
