= Economy of Guyana =

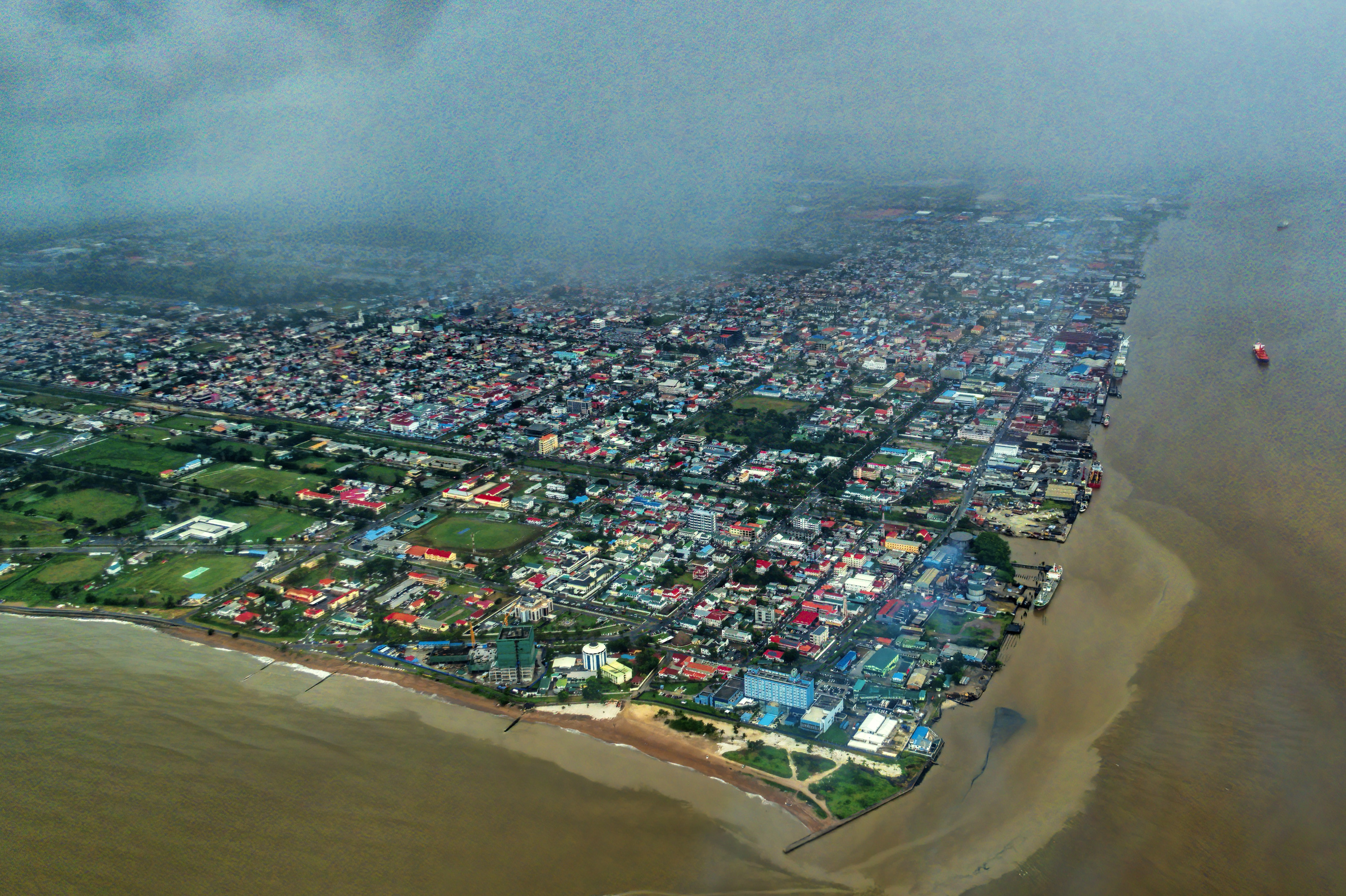
- Downtown Georgetown, Guyana
- Currency: Guyanese dollar (GYD)
- Fiscal year: Calendar year
- Trade organisations: CARICOM, WTO, Prosur, Unasur, Mercosur (associate)
- Country group: Developing/Emerging; High-income economy

Statistics
- Population: ▲956,044 (2024 est.)
- GDP: ▲$40.341 billion (nominal; 2026f); ▲$103.446 billion (PPP; 2026f)
- GDP rank: 112th (nominal; 2026); 105th (PPP; 2026)
- GDP growth: ▲43.8% (2024); ▲19.3% (2025); ▲22.3% (2026f); ▲16.8% (2027f)
- GDP per capita: ▲$38,572 (nominal; 2026f); ▲$98,912 (PPP; 2026f)
- GDP per capita rank: 36th (nominal; 2026); 9th (PPP; 2026)
- GDP per capita growth: ▲18.6% (real; 2025)
- GDP by sector: agriculture: 8%; industry: 74.3%; services: 15.3%; (2024 est.)
- Inflation (CPI): ▲4.1% (2026f)
- Population below national poverty line: 35% (2006 est.)
- Gini coefficient: 44.6 medium (2007)
- Human Development Index: ▲0.776 high (2023) (89th); N/A IHDI (2023)
- Labour force: ▲326,682 (2025); ▲43.3% employment rate (2019)
- Unemployment: ▲12.0% (2025)
- Youth unemployment: ▲24.9% (2025)
- Informal employment: 49.4% (2024)
- Average gross salary: $759 USD / 166,975 GYD (2025 Q4, monthly)

External
- Exports: ▲$24.9 billion (2024)
- Export goods: crude petroleum, sugar, gold, bauxite, alumina, rice, shrimp, molasses, rum, timber, railway shipping containers
- Main export partners: EU 42.6%; Netherlands 11.1%; Germany 10.2%; Spain 6.03%; United States 21.1%; Panama 10.2%; Trinidad and Tobago 6.69%; United Kingdom 3.74%; Mercosur 3.66%; Brazil 3.66%; UAE 1.83% (2024)
- Imports: ▲$7.16 billion (2024)
- Import goods: floating drilling platforms, refined petroleum, valves, construction vehicles, cars manufacturing, machinery, food
- Main import partners: United States 31%; China 13.8%; EU 8.96%; Netherlands 2.05%; Italy 1.56%; South Korea 6.9%; Mercosur 5.91%; Brazil 5.49%; Uruguay 0.35%; Trinidad and Tobago 5.67%; United Kingdom 4.06%; Japan 3.24% (2024)

Public finance
- Government debt: ▼44% of GDP (2021 est.)
- Budget balance: −5.3% (of GDP) (2020)
- Revenue: 1.002 billion (2017)
- Spending: 1.164 billion (2017)
- Economic aid: $5.8 million (2020)
- Credit rating: N/A
- All values, unless otherwise stated, are in US dollars.

The economy of Guyana is the fastest growing economy in the world, with a gross domestic product (GDP) growth of 22.3% in 2026. In 2025, Guyana had a per capita gross domestic product (purchasing power parity) of Int$79,792. Guyana's economy was transformed in 2015 with the discovery of an offshore oil field in the country's waters about 190 km (120 mi) from Georgetown, making the first commercial-grade crude oil draw in December 2019, sending it abroad for refining.

== Overview ==
Developed in conjunction with the World Bank and the International Monetary Fund (IMF), an economic recovery program significantly reduced the government's role in the economy, encouraged foreign investment, enabled the government to clear all its arrears on loan repayments to foreign governments and the multilateral banks, and brought about the sale of 15 of the 41 government-owned (parastatal) businesses. The cellphone company and assets in the timber, rice, and fishing industries also were privatized. International corporations were hired to manage the huge state sugar company, GuySuCo, and the most significant state bauxite mine. An American company was allowed to open a bauxite mine, and two Canadian companies were permitted to develop the largest open-pit gold mine in South America. However, efforts to privatize the two state-owned bauxite mining companies, Berbice Mining Company and Linden Mining Company have so far been unsuccessful.

Most price controls were removed, the laws affecting mining and oil exploration were improved, and an investment policy receptive to foreign investment was announced. Tax reforms designed to promote exports and agricultural production in the private sector were enacted.

=== Debt ===
Since 1986, Guyana has received its entire wheat supply from the United States on concessional terms under a PL 480 Food for Peace programme. It is now supplied on a grant basis. The Guyanese currency generated by the sale of the wheat is used for purposes agreed upon by the U.S. and Guyana Governments. As with many developing countries, Guyana is heavily indebted. Reduction of the debt burden has been one of the present administration's top priorities. In 1999, through the Paris Club "Lyons terms" and the Heavily Indebted Poor Countries (HIPC) initiative Guyana managed to negotiate $256 million in debt forgiveness.

In qualifying for HIPC assistance, for the first time, Guyana became eligible for a reduction of its multilateral debt. About half of Guyana's debt is owed to the multilateral development banks and 20% to its neighbour Trinidad and Tobago, which until 1986 was its principal supplier of petroleum products. Almost all debt to the U.S. government has been forgiven. In late 1999, net international reserves were at $123.2 million, down from $254 million in 1994. However, net international reserves had rebounded to $174.1 million by January 2001.

Guyana's extremely high debt burden to foreign creditors has meant limited availability of foreign exchange and reduced capacity to import necessary raw materials, spare parts, and equipment, thereby further reducing production. The increase in global fuel costs also contributed to the country's decline in production and growing trade deficit. The decline of production has increased unemployment. Although no reliable statistics exist, combined unemployment and underemployment are estimated at 30%.

Emigration, principally to the U.S. and Canada, remains substantial. Net emigration in 1998 was estimated to be about 1.4 percent of the population, and in 1999, this figure totalled 1.2 percent. After years of a state-dominated economy, the mechanisms for private investment, domestic or foreign, are still evolving. The shift from a state-controlled economy to a primarily mixed economic system began under Desmond Hoyte and continued under PPP/CIVIC governments. The current PPP/C administration recognizes the need for foreign investment to create jobs, enhance technical capabilities, and generate goods for export.

The foreign exchange market was fully liberalized in 1991, and currency is now freely traded without restriction. The rate is subject to change on a daily basis, but the Guyana dollar has depreciated 17.6% from 1998 to 2000 and may depreciate further pending the stability of the post-election period.

== Economic history ==
=== European settlement and plantation workforce ===
The Dutch were the first to settle Guyana in the 1600s, engaging in trade with the Amerindians and establishing plantations. It was soon discovered that the soil and climate were ideal for growing sugar cane and slaves from Africa were brought in to work on these plantations. The colonies of the Guianas were merged and taken into the British empire. When slavery was abolished, a new wave of labour was brought from India as indentured servants. Politics was greatly controlled by powerful plantation owners. Portuguese and Chinese also came into the country as agricultural labour, but eventually settled into their own specific service industries.

=== Nationalization ===
When Guyana became independent from British rule, there was a great need to ensure the economy was locally owned after centuries of foreign involvement. Socialist policies were of great interest at the time, and nearly every sector of industry was nationalized during the Burnham presidency of the 1970s, with new agencies established to support the poor and working class. Initially, government investment was successful to aid growth, but lacked management skills and was weak in the face of world commodity prices and competition. Economic and political strife went hand in hand, and the population dwindled from resulting waves of emigration.

=== Opening of markets ===
The economy made dramatic progress after President Hoyte's 1989 economic recovery program. As a result, Guyana's GDP increased 6% in 1991 following 15 years of decline. Growth was consistently above six percent until 1995, when it dipped to 5.1 percent. The government reported that the economy grew at a rate of 7.9 percent in 1996, 6.2 percent in 1997, and fell 1.3 percent in 1998. The 1999 growth rate was three percent. The unofficial growth rate in 2005 was 0.5 percent. In 2006, it was 3.2%.

== Infrastructure ==
Infrastructure is primarily concentrated on the coast, and there is difficulty in building up industries in the hinterlands due to limitations of access and energy.

=== Electrical ===
The electricity sector in Guyana is dominated by Guyana Power and Light (GPL), the state-owned vertically integrated utility. Although the country has a large potential for hydroelectric and bagasse-fueled power generation, most of its 226 MW of installed capacity correspond to thermoelectric diesel-engine driven generators.

Reliability or electricity supply is very low, linked both to technical and institutional deficiencies in the sector, with total losses close to 40% and commercial losses of about 30%. This low reliability has led most firms to install their own diesel generators, which in turn leads to higher than average electricity costs.

In Guyana, the areas outside of the coastal plain are referred to as hinterland. Approximately twenty percent of the Guyanese population live in the hinterland. The population mostly consists of Amerindian communities who have little access to modern energy services such as electricity, light and modern fuels for cooking and transportation. This situation contrasts with the coastal plain, where there is access to the electricity grid. Several initiatives are in place to improve energy services in the hinterland.

According to a 2013 survey of Amerindian villages done by the Inter-American Development Bank, "the most common source of electricity was a government-donated 65kW photovoltaic panel, and the second most common was a village-operated diesel generator. A few households reported having personal generators and privately purchased photovoltaic panels. In most villages, electric service is intermittent, provided for only four to six hours per day." St. Ignatius is an exception, as the community receives electricity from the Lethem grid.

=== Telecommunications ===
Telecommunications in Guyana include radio, television, fixed and mobile telephones, and the Internet. Early telecommunications were owned by large foreign firms until the industry was nationalized in the 1970s. Government stifled criticism with a tight control of the media, and the infrastructure lagged behind other countries, Guyana Telephone and Telegraph Company (GT&T) holding a monopoly on most such services. In a 2012 census report on Guyanese households, 55.5% had a radio, 82.7% had a television, 27.8% had a personal computer, and 16.2% had internet at home, 49.3% had a telephone landline, and 70.6% had a cellular phone.

In the 1990s, a shift towards privatization was geared towards improving the overall quality of services in the country. The 2016 Telecommunications Act was made to improve quality and lower prices for consumers as well as establish universal access.

=== Water supply and sanitation ===
Guyana, meaning "land of many waters", is rich in water resources. Most of the population is concentrated in the coastal plain, much of which is below sea level and is protected by a series of sea walls. A series of shallow reservoirs inland of the coastal plain, called "water conservancies", store surface water primarily for irrigation needs. Key issues in the water and sanitation sector in Guyana are poor service quality, a low level of cost recovery and low levels of access.

== Major economic sectors ==
Agriculture and mining are Guyana's most important economic activities, with sugar, bauxite, rice, and gold accounting for 70–75 percent of export earnings. However, the rice sector experienced a decline in 2000, with export earnings down 27 percent through the third quarter of 2000. Ocean shrimp exports, which were heavily impacted by a one-month import ban to the United States in 1999, accounted for only 3.5 percent of total export earnings that year. Shrimp exports rebounded in 2000, representing 11 percent of export earnings through the third quarter of 2000. Other exports include timber, diamonds, garments, rum, and pharmaceuticals. The value of these other exports is increasing.

=== Agriculture ===
Sugar is the most historically important product of Guyana, however, the industry has been in decline due to global competition and other factors. It still is a major export, along with its related products molasses and rum. Banks DIH and Demerara Distilleries are the countries' only distillers, but Guyana is the world's 14th largest exporter of rum.

In 2018, Guyana produced 1.2 million tonnes of sugar cane, 964 thousand tonnes of rice, 136 thousand tonnes of coconut, in addition to smaller productions of other products agricultural products, such as eggplant (47 thousand tonnes), pepper (37 thousand tonnes), pineapple (34 thousand tonnes), banana (23 thousand tonnes), orange (21 thousand tonnes), cassava (20 thousand tonnes), etc.

=== Mining ===
Mining has surpassed the economic importance of sugar in recent years, making up a sizable portion of Guyana's GDP. The large-scale gold and bauxite mining operations are all foreign-owned, but the vast proportion of gold and diamond mining is done by small and medium-scale miners.

=== Petroleum ===
In the 2010s, significant off-shore oil finds by Exxon has renewed interest in foreign investment in the country. A 2018 estimate predicts Guyana's oilfields are holding over 3.2 billion barrels. Off-shore crude oil extraction began in 2019.

By 2024, oil production in Guyana had soared to approximately 645,000 barrels per day (bpd), marking a significant increase from 98,000 bpd in its initial full year of production. Guyana increased crude oil production by an annual average of 98,000 b/d from 2020 to 2023, making it the third-fastest growing non-OPEC producing country during this period. The expansion of this sector has significantly contributed to the national economy, with the petroleum industry driving a 62.3 percent GDP growth in 2022, the highest globally according to the IMF. Looking forward, Guyana plans to further boost its production capacity to about 1.3 million bpd by 2027 through the development of new projects like Yellowtail, Uaru, and Whiptail. In December 2024, Guyana became the third largest per capita petroleum producing country in the world.

==== 2025 ====
In the first quarter of 2025, Guyana’s Natural Resource Fund (NRF) received USD 605.5 million in oil revenues, including seven profit oil payments and one royalty payment. These payments were for oil produced from January to March 2025, with two payments related to December 2024 lifts. Despite an increase in daily production, the country's earnings are expected to decline due to a projected 10.9% drop in oil prices, forecasted at USD 71.9 per barrel for 2025. In 2024, Guyana's oil production grew by 57.7%, yielding 225.4 million barrels and generating USD 2.6 billion in revenue. Under the 2016 Production Sharing Agreement, Guyana receives a 2% share of oil sold and a 12.5% profit share after ExxonMobil's expenses. The country is also set to have 246 oil lifts in 2025.

=== Forestry ===
Guyana contains the "largest unspoiled rainforests on the continent". Despite the vast forests covering the country, the timber industry has remained small due to infrastructural limitations such as undeveloped roads and lacking or unreliable electricity to milling operations.

The country also sees large financial contributions from international organizations looking to protect the forests.

=== Fishing ===
Most of what is fished is consumed locally, but there is a sizable export market for ocean shrimp. Overfishing of shrimp has led to Atlantic seabob becoming the most commercially important catch. Commercial fishing is mostly marine, as inland fishing is mostly attributed to subsistence fishing done by Amerindians.

=== Education ===
Education in Guyana is provided largely by the Government of Guyana, through the Ministry of Education and its arms in the ten different regions of the country. Guyana's education system is a legacy from its time as British Guiana, and is similar to that of the other anglophone member states of the Caribbean Community, which are affiliated to the Caribbean Examinations Council (CXC). School curricula, funding, standards and other policies are set by the central government and implemented through the Ministry of Education and related agencies. The Education System is divided into eleven districts, ten of which correspond to the national administrative and geographical regions of the country, while the capital, Georgetown, is treated as a separate education district, district 11. With 8.3% of its GDP spent on education, Guyana sits with Cuba, Iceland, Denmark and Botswana as among the few countries with top spending on education.

The statutory age for beginning compulsory education is five years nine months, and students are required to attend school until age 16. However, children who do not meet the statutory age to begin school are sometimes enrolled early or generally attend some kind of pre-school. To meet the requirements for compulsory education students generally attend public schools, but there are a few private schools which offer education at one or all stages of learning; home-schooling is virtually non-existent in Guyana. The academic year usually begins in September and ends in July of the following year and with the exception of President's College students have a five-hour school day.

Outside of the private sector, free education from nursery to university was the norm in Guyana until the mid-1990s. The current provision of education is subsidised from nursery through secondary schools, with students now having to pay for tuition at some tertiary institutions. This development reflected a change from the 1970s when Guyana became a socialist-inspired Cooperative Republic. The country's educational policy in the 1970s was intended to broaden access to education, as before that education beyond primary school was expensive and designed primarily for a small elite. In the 1970s single-sex schools were made co-educational; private and parochial schools were incorporated into the public system.

The reform which occurred was part of a wider phenomenon in a post-colonial CARICOM aiming to provide an education that reflected the full heritage and aspirations of independent states. Today, as part of its obligations to the CXC, Guyana's educational specifications and assessment procedures are bound by regional guidelines. Students wear uniforms to school.

Guyana has a reading literacy rate at 92% of the population over age 15. Despite this high level of reading literacy, significant portions of the Guyanese population have functional literacy difficulties resulting in a lack of employability and other socio-economic disadvantages; this has caused government and charitable agencies to push education as a tool in poverty reduction.

Guyana is one of the highest ranked developing countries in the Education Index of the United Nations Human Development Report. With a score of 0.943 on the Education Index, its overall rank is 37, but ranks third in the Caribbean after Cuba and Barbados, and second in South America after Argentina. According to DFID, Guyana has achieved the Millennium Development Goal of universal primary education but continues to struggle with the provision of increased access to satisfactory secondary education. As one of the poorest countries in the Western Hemisphere, instruction in Guyana's schools makes little or no use of instructional technologies such as interactive whiteboards or other multimedia tools. Indeed, many schools are short on basic resources, especially in the areas of science and technology, and this sometimes puts students at a disadvantage when compared to their counterparts in the region.

As part of a continuous effort to tackle inequalities and inefficiencies in the system, the parliament of Guyana has been debating and redrafting the 2007 Education bill. The bill moves Guyana closer to a comprehensive education system, but retains the use of corporal punishment as a disciplinary measure, despite Guyana's obligations to international conventions such as the UN Rights of the Child.

The Human Rights Measurement Initiative (HRMI) finds that Guyana is fulfilling only 85.0% of what it should be fulfilling for the right to education based on the country's level of income. HRMI breaks down the right to education by looking at the rights to both primary education and secondary education. While taking into consideration Guyana's income level, the nation is achieving 84.7% of what should be possible based on its resources (income) for primary education and 85.3% for secondary education.

=== Healthcare ===
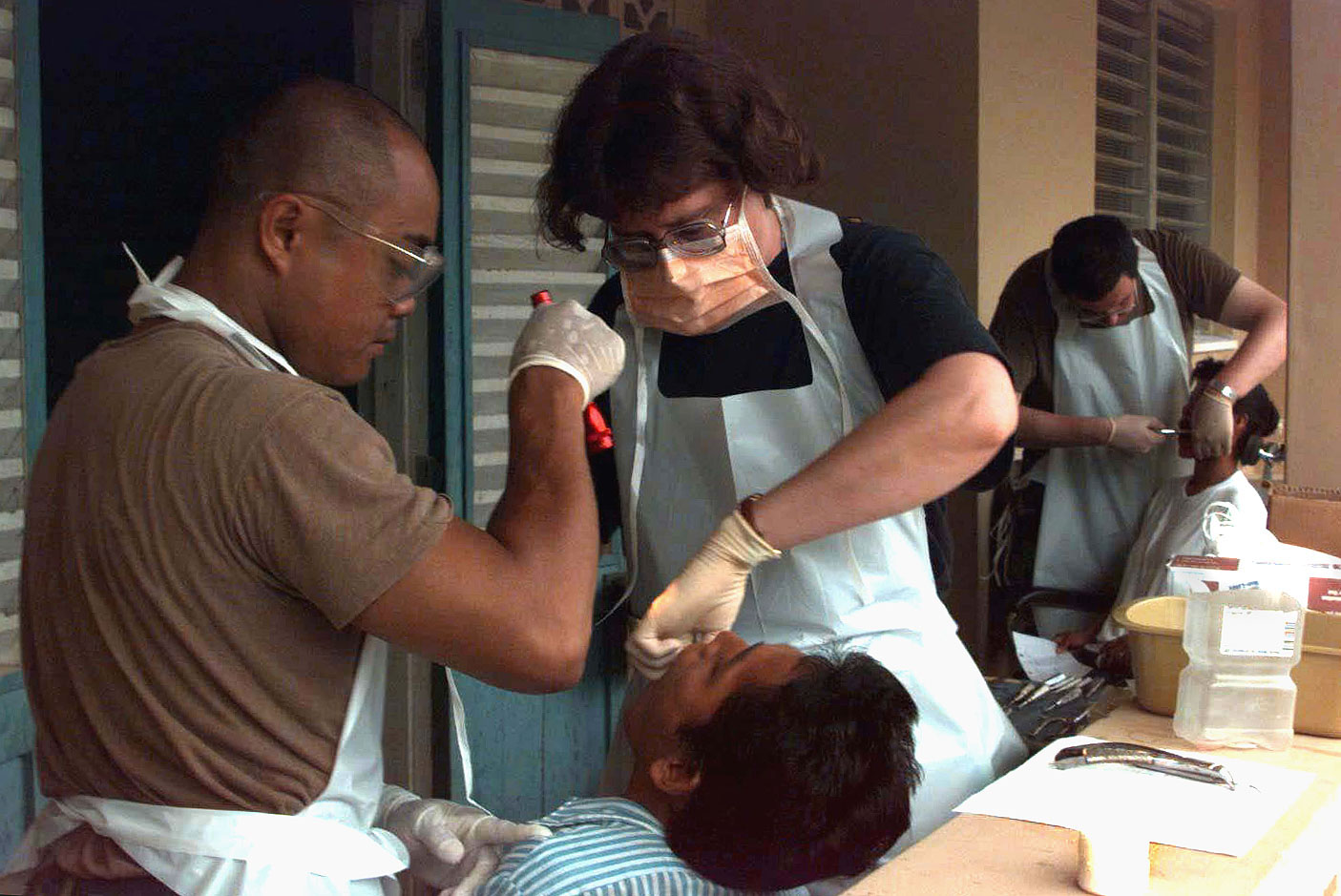
Dental work being performed in Guyana.

Compared with other neighbouring countries, Guyana ranks poorly in regard to basic health indicators. Basic health services in the interior are primitive to non-existent, and some procedures are not available at all. Although Guyana's health profile falls short in comparison with many of its Caribbean neighbours, there has been remarkable progress since 1988, and the Ministry of Health is working to upgrade conditions, procedures, and facilities. Many Guyanese seek medical care in the United States, Trinidad and Tobago or Cuba.

The Human Rights Measurement Initiative finds that Guyana is fulfilling 69.3% of what it should be fulfilling for the right to health based on its level of income. When looking at the right to health with respect to children, Guyana achieves 90.9% of what is expected based on its current income. In regards to the right to health amongst the adult population, the country achieves only 76.3% of what is expected based on the nation's level of income. Guyana falls into the "very bad" category when evaluating the right to reproductive health because the nation is fulfilling only 40.8% of what the nation is expected to achieve based on the resources (income) it has available.

=== Tourism ===
Tourism in Guyana is a fledgling industry compared to other countries in the Caribbean. Tourism is mainly focused on ecotourism, and accommodations for business travelers. Guyana is home to Kaieteur Falls, Mount Roraima, and St. George's Cathedral.

In 2020, 18 businesses and 12 tour guides were licensed with the Guyana Tourism Authority (GTA).

== Macroeconomic statistics ==
Exports of Guyana by product category (2019) Chemical products Transportation Machines Mineral products Plastics and rubbers Metals Foodstuffs Precious metals Textiles Instruments Animal products Vegetable products Paper goods Footwear and headwear Miscellaneous Stone and glass Wood products Animal and vegetable bi-products Animal hides Arts and antiques Weapons

The following table shows the main economic indicators in 1980–2028 (with IMF staff estimates for 2021–2028). Inflation below 3% is in green.

Year	GDP (in Bil. US$PPP)	GDP per capita (in US$ PPP)	GDP (in Bil. US$nominal)	GDP per capita (in US$ nominal)	GDP growth (real)	Inflation rate (in Percent)	Unemployment (in Percent)	Government debt (in % of GDP)
1980	▲1.88	▲2,421.5	▲0.84	▲1,101.9	▼-2.1%	▲14.1%	7.1%	n/a
1981	▲2.07	▲2,711.7	▼0.81	▼1,055.8	▲0.6%	▲22.2%	▲7.6%	n/a
1982	▼2.01	▼2,625.2	▼0.69	▼904.9	▼-8.9%	▲20.6%	▲9.7%	n/a
1983	▼1.85	▼2,421.5	▲0.70	▲921.5	▼-11.5%	▲15.3%	▼9.6%	n/a
1984	▲1.95	▲2,574.7	▼0.65	▼861.1	▲2.1%	▲25.1%	▼7.5%	n/a
1985	▲2.02	▲2,682.4	▲0.70	▲924.3	▲0.4%	▲15.0%	▼7.1%	n/a
1986	▲2.06	▲2,751.3	▲0.79	▲1,053.7	▼-0.2%	▲7.9%	▼7.0%	n/a
1987	▲2.11	▲2,841.5	▼0.73	▼982.3	▼-0.1%	▲28.7%	▼6.1%	n/a
1988	▼2.05	▼2,790.8	▲0.83	▲1,125.9	▼-6.0%	▲33.9%	▼5.4%	n/a
1989	▼2.03	▲2,791.0	0.83	▲1,146.2	▼-4.9%	▲89.5%	▼5.2%	n/a
1990	▲2.04	▲2,831.7	▼0.69	▼951.0	▼-3.0%	▲64.3%	▲5.6%	n/a
1991	▲2.24	▲3,112.5	▲0.74	▲1,036.9	▲6.0%	▲103.1%	▲6.8%	n/a
1992	▲2.46	▲3,429.4	▲0.82	▲1,145.8	▲7.8%	▲26.7%	▲7.4%	n/a
1993	▲3.73	▲3,789.2	▲1.00	▲1,393.0	▲8.2%	▲8.4%	▼6.9%	n/a
1994	▼3.02	▲4,180.9	▲1.18	▲1,626.9	▲8.5%	▲12.4%	▼6.1%	n/a
1995	▲3.24	▲4,459.7	▲1.33	▲1,832.4	▲5.1%	▲12.2%	▼5.5%	n/a
1996	▲3.56	▲4,882.5	▲1.50	▲2,048.5	▲8.0%	▲7.1%	▼5.4%	n/a
1997	▲3.85	▲5,245.1	▲1.59	▲2,161.6	▲6.2%	▲3.6%	▼4.9%	101.4%
1998	▲3.83	▼5,192.4	▼1.50	▼2,035.9	▼-1.7%	▲4.6%	▼4.5%	▲108.0%
1999	▲4.00	▲5,400.8	▼1.49	▼2,010.8	▲3.0%	▲7.5%	▼4.2%	▼97.1%
2000	▲4.03	▲5,434.1	▲1.50	▲2,017.2	▼-1.3%	▲6.1%	▼3.9%	▲97.2%
2001	▲4.22	▲5,673.3	1.50	▲2,023.6	▲2.3%	▲2.6%	▲4.7%	▲104.6%
2002	▲4.33	▲5,828.4	▲1.56	▲2,093.0	▲1.1%	▲5.4%	▲5.7%	▲105.1%
2003	▲4.39	▲5,909.2	▲1.59	▲2,144.1	▼-0.7%	▲6.0%	▲5.9%	▼95.6%
2004	▲4.58	▲6,116.0	▲1.66	▲2,333.0	▲1.6%	▲4.7%	▼5.5%	▲91.8%
2005	▲4.63	▲6,233.0	▲1.71	▲2,305.9	▼-1.9%	▲6.9%	▼5.0%	▼90.7%
2006	▲5.02	▲6,741.1	▲1.90	▲2,551.8	▲5.1%	▲6.7%	▼4.6%	▼74.5%
2007	▲5.51	▲7,389.4	▲2.23	▲2,982.2	▲7.0%	▲12.2%	4.6%	▼47.0%
2008	▲5.73	▲7,659.5	▲2.49	▲3,329.6	▲2.0%	▲8.1%	▲5.8%	▲47.6%
2009	▲5.96	▲7,932.6	▲2.60	▲3,457.4	▲3.3%	▲3.0%	▲9.2%	▲51.7%
2010	▲6.29	▲8,356.6	▲2.89	▲3,837.3	▲4.4%	▲4.3%	▲9.6%	▲52.5%
2011	▲6.77	▲8,958.3	▲3.33	▲4,402.8	▲5.4%	▲4.4%	▼8.9%	▼51.2%
2012	▲7.92	▲10,443.7	▲4.06	▲5,360.3	▲5.0%	▲2.4%	▼8.0%	▼44.3%
2013	▲8.37	▲10,998.3	▲4.17	▲5,476.7	▲3.7%	▲1.9%	▼7.3%	▼41.1%
2014	▼8.36	▼10,942.8	▼4.13	▼5,402.7	▲1.7%	▲0.7%	▼6.1%	▼38.3%
2015	▲8.59	▲11,204.6	▲4.28	▲5,580.0	▼0.7%	▲-0.9%	▼5.2%	▲41.8%
2016	▲8.71	▲11,268.4	▲4.48	▲5,796.8	▲3.8%	▲0.8%	▼4.8%	▲43.8%
2017	▲9.31	▲11,964.6	▲4.75	▲6,104.2	▲3.7%	▲1.9%	▼4.3%	▼42.9%
2018	▲9.95	▲12,725.0	▲4.79	▲6,120.5	▲4.4%	▲1.3%	▼3.8%	▲47.0%
2019	▲10.68	▲13,605.8	▲5.17	▲6,594.4	▲5.4%	▲2.1%	▼3.6%	▼43.6%
2020	▲15.52	▲19,717.1	▲5.47	▲6,952.7	▲43.5%	▲1.2%	▲8.0%	▲51.1%
2021	▲19.47	▲24,661.7	▲7.66	▲9,702.5	▲20.1%	▲3.3%	▼5.3%	▼43.2%
2022	▲33.80	▲42,698.9	▲14.52	▲18,342.3	▲62.3%	▲6.5%	▼3.5%	▼27.8%
2023	▲48.16	▲60,648.1	▲16.31	▲20,539.9	▲37.2%	▲6.6%	3.5%	▲29.8%
2024	▲71.54	▲89,924.7	▲22.01	▲27,641.2	▲45.3%	▲5.5%	▲3.9%	▼24.2%
2025	▲75.38	▲94,370.1	▲22.63	▲28,330.0	▲3.4%	▲5.0%	3.9%	▼24.1%
2026	▲104.9	▲130,912.7	▲29.58	▲36,919.5	▲36.6%	▲5.0%	3.9%	▼18.9%
2027	▲110.4	▲137,334.8	▲30.46	▲37,907.2	▲3.3%	▲5.0%	3.9%	▼18.8%
2028	▲116.2	▲144,160.3	▲31.43	▲38,998.6	▲3.3%	▲5.0%	3.9%	▼18.6%

== See also ==
- List of Guyanese companies
- Corruption in Guyana
- Guyana Stock Exchange
- Suriname-Guyana Chamber of Commerce
- Guyanese dollar
- Bank of Guyana
- Republic Bank (Guyana)
- Ministry of Finance (Guyana)
- Guyana Agricultural and General Workers' Union
- CARIFORUM–United Kingdom Economic Partnership Agreement
- Economy of South America
- Education financing in Guyana
