= Economy of Timor-Leste =

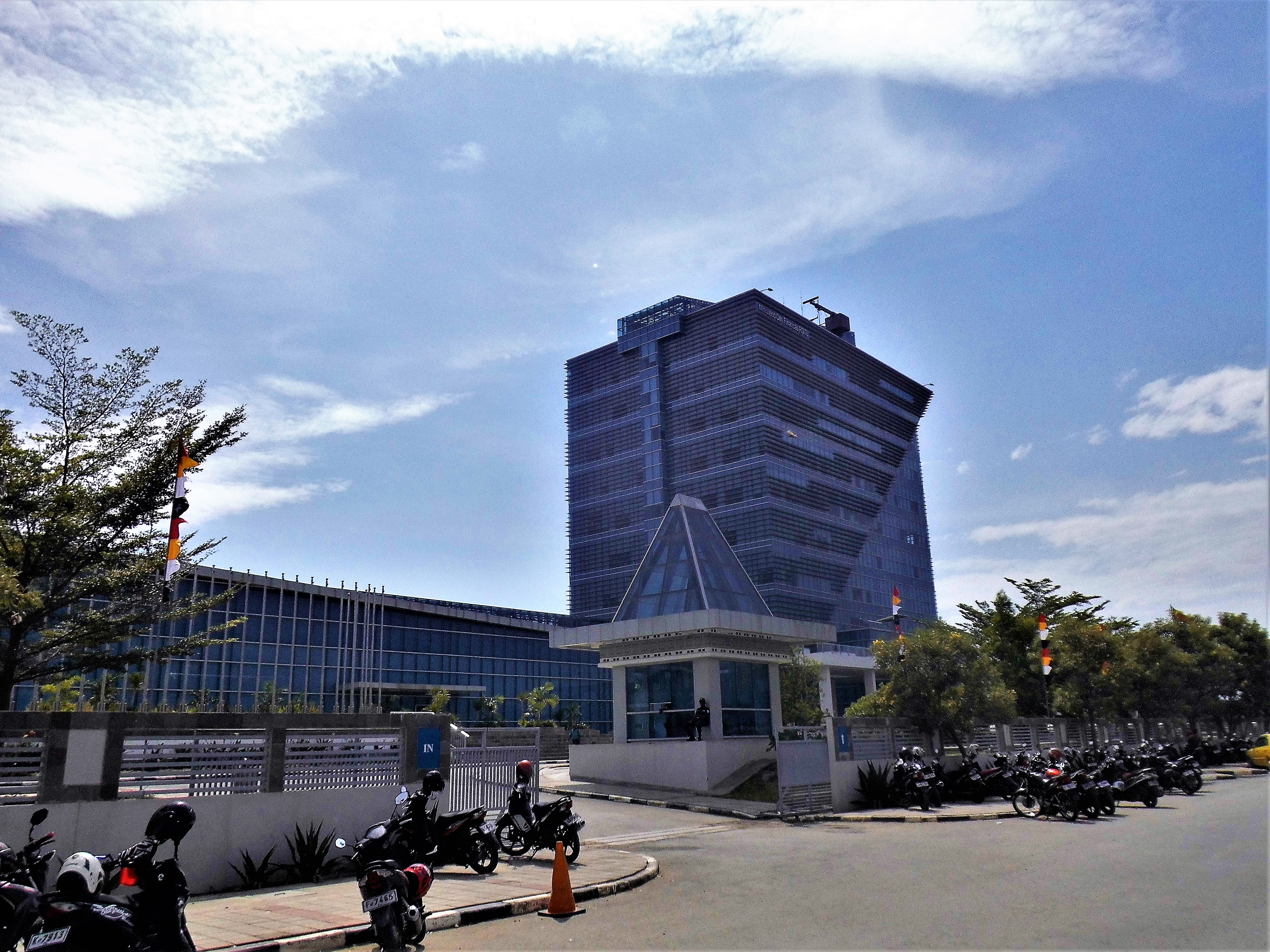
- Ministry of Finance building, Timor-Leste.
- Currency: US dollar (USD) and Timor-Leste centavos
- Fiscal year: Calendar year
- Trade organisations: ASEAN; G77
- Country group: Least Developed; Lower-middle income economy

Statistics
- GDP: ▲$2.17 billion (nominal; 2026); ▲$7.52 billion (PPP; 2026)
- GDP rank: 174th (nominal; 2026); 170th (PPP; 2026)
- GDP growth: 4.1% (2024); 3.9% (2025)
- GDP per capita: ▲$1,520 (nominal; 2026); ▲$5,270 (PPP; 2026)
- GDP per capita rank: 163th (nominal; 2026); 155st (PPP; 2026)
- GDP per capita growth: -10.2% (2024)
- GDP by sector: agriculture: 9.1%; industry: 56.7%; services: 34.4%; (2017)
- Inflation (CPI): 0.96% (2019 est.)
- Population below national poverty line: 49.9% (2007 est.): ▼22.0% on less than $1.90/day (2014); ▼65.9% on less than $3.20/day (2014); ▼91.8% on less than $5.50/day (2014)
- Gini coefficient: 28.7 (2014 est.)
- Human Development Index: ▼0.634 medium (2023) (142nd); ▼0.451 low IHDI (2019)
- Labour force: 581,000 (2022 est.)
- Unemployment: 1.79% (2022 est.)
- Main industries: printing, soap manufacturing, handicrafts, woven cloth

External
- Exports: $60 million (2020 est.)
- Export goods: crude petroleum, natural gas, coffee, various vegetables, scrap iron
- Main export partners: China 25.5%; Indonesia 20.4%; Japan 14.5%; South Korea 13.4%; Thailand 6.57% (2022)
- Imports: $850 million (2020 est.)
- Import goods: refined petroleum, cars, cement, delivery trucks, motorcycles
- Main import partners: Indonesia 27.1%; China 23.2%; Singapore 8.97%; Australia 6.31% (2022)
- Gross external debt: $232.4 million (2021); 15.63% GDP (2021)

Public finance
- Foreign reserves: $279,000,000 (December 2013)
- All values, unless otherwise stated, are in US dollars.

The economy of Timor-Leste is a lower-middle income economy as ranked by the World Bank. It is placed 142nd on the Human Development Index, indicating a medium level of human development. 20% of the population is unemployed, and 52.9% live on less than $1.25 a day. About half of the population is illiterate. At 27%, Timor-Leste's urbanisation rate is one of the lowest in the world.

In 2007, a bad harvest caused a "major food crisis" in Timor-Leste. By November, eleven sub-districts still needed food supplied by international aid.

According to data gathered in the 2010 census, 87.7% of urban and 18.9% of rural households have electricity, for an overall average of 36.7%.

== History ==
Prior to and during colonisation, the island of Timor was best known for its sandalwood. The Portuguese colonial administration also granted concessions to Oceanic Exploration Corporation to develop oil and gas deposits. However, this was curtailed by the Indonesian invasion in 1976.

Petrochemical resources were divided between Indonesia and Australia with the Timor Gap Treaty in 1989. The treaty established guidelines for joint exploitation of seabed resources in the area of the "gap" left by then-Portuguese Timor in the maritime boundary agreed between the two countries in 1972. Revenues from the joint area were to be divided 50-50. Woodside Petroleum and ConocoPhillips began development of some resources in the Timor Gap on behalf of the two governments in 1992.

In late 1999, about 70% of the economic infrastructure of Timor-Leste was destroyed by Indonesian troops and anti-independence militias, and 260,000 people were forced westward. From 2002 to 2005, an international program led by the United Nations, staffed by civilian advisers, 5,000 peacekeepers (8,000 at peak) and 1,300 police officers, substantially reconstructed the infrastructure. By mid-2002, all but about 50,000 of the refugees had returned.

The economy grew by about 10% in 2011 and at a similar rate in 2012.

While Timor-Leste gained revenue from offshore oil and gas reserves, little of it has been spent on the development of villages, which still rely on subsistence farming. As of 2012, nearly half the East Timorese population was living in extreme poverty.

== Macroeconomic statistics ==
Year	GDP (in bil. US$ PPP)	GDP (in bil. US$ nominal)	GDP per capita (in US$ nominal)	GDP growth (real)	GDP per capita growth (real)	Inflation rate (in %)	Government debt (in % of GDP)
1993		0.36	480				
1994		0.43	561				
1995		0.50	658				
1996		0.61	801				
1997		0.71	926				
1998		0.25	328				
1999		0.25	328				
2000	1.1	0.37	415				
2001	1.3	0.48	530				
2002	1.2	0.47	508				
2003	1.2	0.49	517				
2004	1.3	0.44	453				
2005	1.4	0.46	464				
2006	1.3	0.45	446				
2007	1.5	0.54	523				
2008	1.7	0.65	614				
2009	1.9	0.73	676				
2010	2.1	0.88	806				
2011	2.3	1.04	936				
2012	2.7	1.16	1,024				
2013	2.9	1.40	1,210				
2014	3.2	1.45	1,232				
2015	3.5	1.59	1,332				
2016	3.8	1.65	1,353				
2017	3.9	1.62	1,299				
2018	4.0	1.58	1,249				
2019	5.0	2.05	1,583				
2020	6.7	1.90	1,442				
2021	7.3	1.90	1,442				
2022	9.4	2.45	1,793				
2023	5.1	1.99	1,425				

== International trade ==
Exports of Timor-Leste by product category (2019) Chemical products Transportation Machines Mineral products Plastics and rubbers Metals Foodstuffs Precious metals Textiles Instruments Animal products Vegetable products Paper goods Footwear and headwear Miscellaneous Stone and glass Wood products Animal and vegetable bi-products Animal hides Arts and antiques Weapons

Timor-Leste's principal merchandise exports in 2023 were crude petroleum, aircraft parts, unroasted coffee, liquefied butane and tankers, in descending order of export value. The country exported US$164 million worth of goods, with China, Singapore, Australia, Indonesia and Japan as its largest export markets.

Merchandise imports amounted to US$909 million in 2023. The largest imported products were refined petroleum products, broken rice, Portland cement, motorcycles with reciprocating piston engines and semi-milled or wholly milled rice. Indonesia, China, Singapore, Taiwan and Australia were the country's largest import partners.

== Sectors ==
In the Doing Business 2013 report by the World Bank, Timor-Leste was ranked 169th overall and last in the East Asia and Pacific region. The country fared particularly poorly in the "registering property", "enforcing contracts", and "resolving insolvency" categories, ranking last worldwide in all three. In 2020 it ranked 181st. There are no patent laws in Timor-Leste.

Regarding telecommunications infrastructure, Timor-Leste is the second to last ranked Asian country in the World Economic Forum's Network Readiness Index (NRI), with only Myanmar falling behind it in Southeast Asia. In the 2014 NRI ranking, Timor-Leste ranked number 141 overall, down from 134 in 2013.

Timor-Leste is part of the Timor-Leste–Indonesia–Australia Growth Triangle (TIA-GT).

=== Agriculture ===
The agriculture sector employs 80% of Timor-Leste's active population. In 2009, about 67,000 households grew coffee in Timor-Leste, with a large proportion of those households being poor. Currently, the gross margins are about $120 per hectare, with returns per labour-day of about $3.70. There were 11,000 households growing mung beans as of 2009, most of them by subsistence farming. 94% of domestic fish catch comes from the ocean, especially coastal fisheries. 66% of families are in part supported by these subsistence activities, however the country as a whole does not produce enough food to be self-sustaining, and thus relies on imports. Coffee, rice, maize, coconuts, cassava, soybeans, bananas, mango, and sweet potatoes are cultivated here. With 5,014 Metric Tons in 2019, the country was ranked number 42 among other countries in Avocados Production.

After petroleum, the second largest export is coffee, which generates about $10 million a year. 9,000 tonnes of coffee, 108 tonnes of cinnamon, and 161 tonnes of cocoa were harvested in 2012 making the country the 40th ranked producer of coffee, the 6th ranked producer of cinnamon and the 50th ranked producer of cocoa worldwide. In 2019, 186 Metric Tons of cocoa beans were produced and the country was number 48.

=== Energy ===
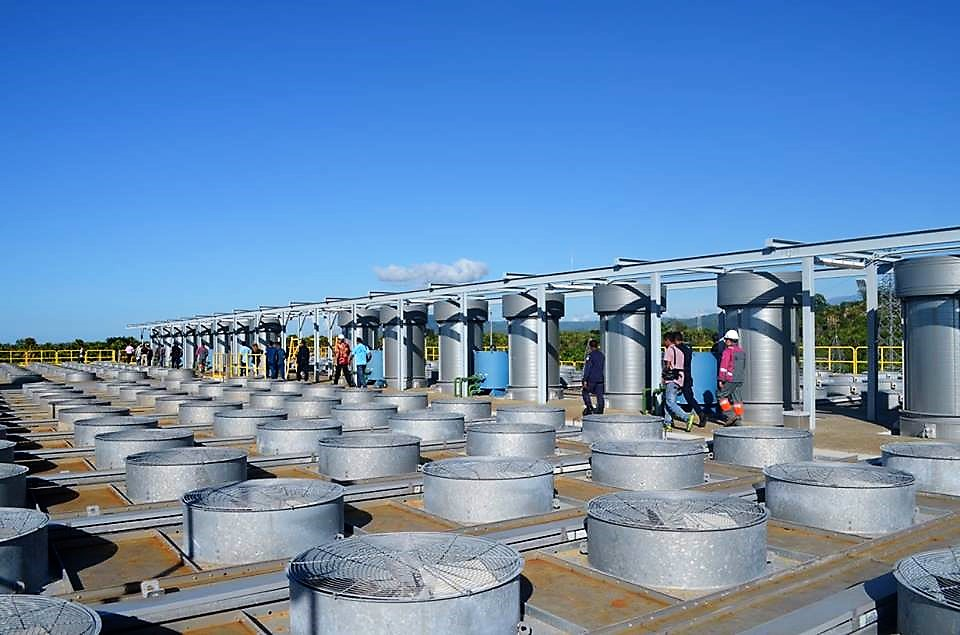
Betano Power Station, powered by imported fuel oil

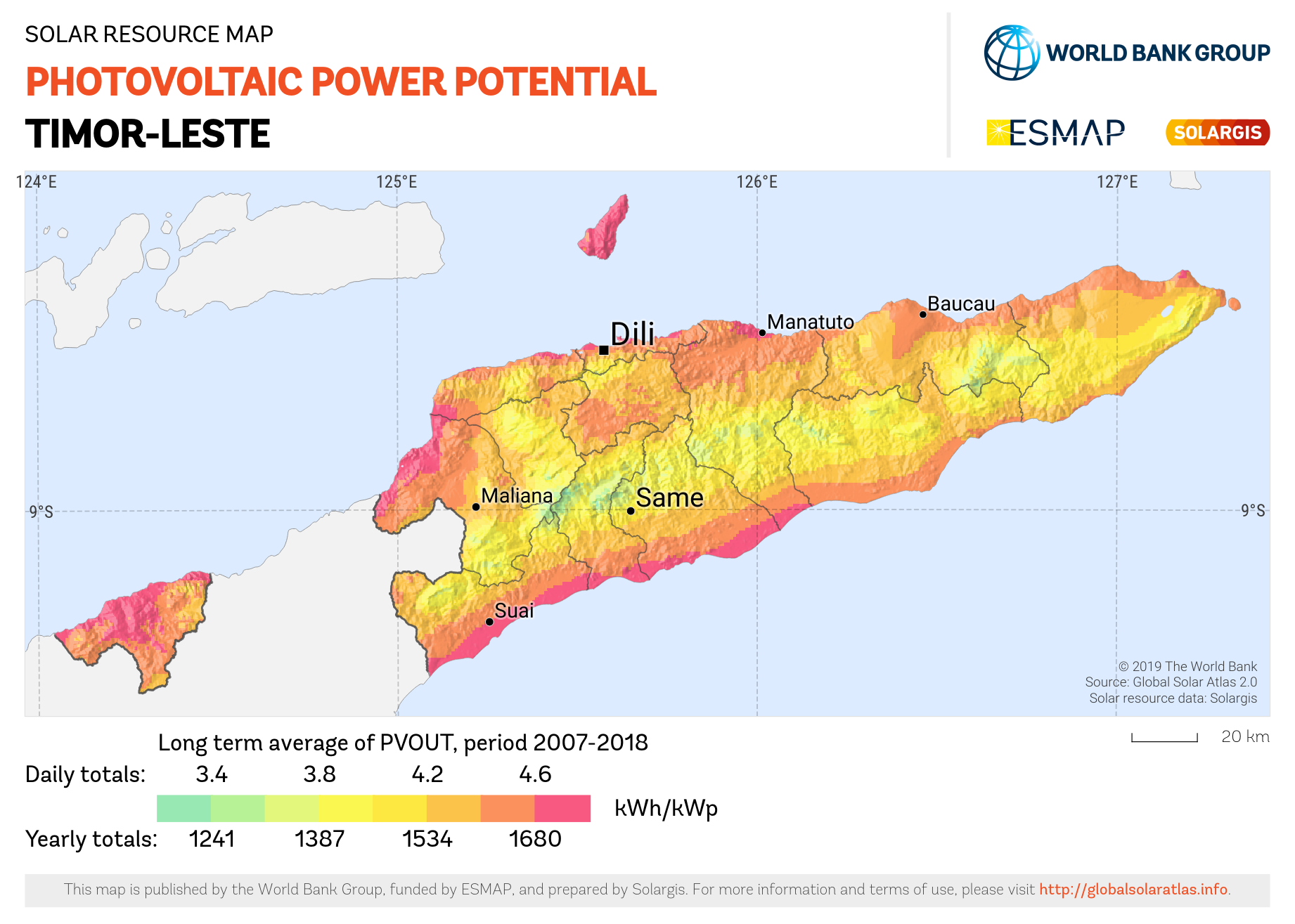
Map of Timor-Leste with photovoltaic potential shaded; as can be seen, it is very high, especially near the coast.

Timor-Leste consumes 125 GWh of electricity per annum, an average of 95 kWh per person. The country has about 270 MW of electricity capacity, 119 MW in the city of Hera.

Most of the energy infrastructure was destroyed by the Indonesian militias during the 1999 East Timorese crisis. In 2005, the government identified the high price of electricity (US$0.20 per kWh) as a deterrent to development. Gariuai Hydroelectric Plant is the country's only hydro plant, with a production capacity of 326 kW. Many people rely on diesel generators. A feasibility study of 2007–10 concluded that the country had huge potential for renewable energy.

==== Oil and gas ====
The Portuguese colonial administration granted concessions to the Australia-bound Oceanic Exploration Corporation to develop petroleum and natural gas deposits in the waters southeast of Timor. However, this was curtailed by the Indonesian invasion in 1976. The resources were divided between Indonesia and Australia with the Timor Gap Treaty in 1989. Timor-Leste inherited no permanent maritime boundaries when it attained independence. A provisional agreement (the Timor Sea Treaty, signed when Timor-Leste became independent on 20 May 2002) defined a Joint Petroleum Development Area (JPDA) and awarded 90% of revenues from existing projects in that area to Timor-Leste and 10% to Australia. An agreement in 2005 between the governments of Timor-Leste and Australia mandated that both countries put aside their dispute over maritime boundaries and that Timor-Leste would receive 50% of the revenues from the resource exploitation in the area (estimated at A$26 billion, or about US$20 billion over the lifetime of the project) from the Greater Sunrise development. In 2013, Timor-Leste launched a case at the Permanent Court of Arbitration in The Hague to pull out of a gas treaty that it had signed with Australia, accusing the Australian Secret Intelligence Service (ASIS) of bugging the East Timorese cabinet room in Dili in 2004.

At the time of independence Timor-Leste had per capita natural wealth equivalent to the wealth of an upper-middle income country. Over half of this was in oil, and over a quarter natural gas. The Timor-Leste Petroleum Fund was established in 2005 to turn these non-renewable resources into a more sustainable form of wealth. By 2009 it had a value of US$4.8 billion, and by 2011 it had reached a worth of US$8.7 billion. Timor-Leste is labelled by the International Monetary Fund as the "most oil-dependent economy in the world". The Petroleum Fund pays for nearly all of the government's annual budget, which increased from $70 million in 2004 to $1.3 billion in 2011, with a $1.8 billion proposal for 2012. East-Timor's income from oil and gas stands to increase significantly after its cancellation of a controversial agreement with Australia, which gave Australia half of the income from oil and gas from 2006. From 2005 to 2021, $23 billion earned from oil sales has entered the fund. $8 billion has been generated from investments, while $12 billion has been spent. A decrease in oil and gas reserves led to decreasing HDI beginning in 2010. 80% of government spending comes from this fund, which as of 2021 had $19 billion, 10 times greater than the size of the national budget. As oil income has decreased, the fund is at risk of being exhausted. Withdrawals have exceeded sustainable levels almost every year since 2009.

==== Electricity ====
Electricidade De Timor-Leste (EDTL) is the vertically integrated monopoly generator and distributor of electric power within the on-grid areas.

=== Tourism ===
In 2017, the country was visited by 75,000 tourists. Since the later 2010s, tourism has been increasing and the number of hotels and resorts has increased. The government decided to invest in the expansion of the international airport in Dili.

=== Transport ===
Transport in Timor-Leste consists of roads, buses and minibuses, ferries, and airplanes, with roads being the primary mode of transport. Timor-Leste's transportation infrastructure is underdeveloped, with much of the road network in poor condition, though the government has invested significantly in upgrades since independence.

There are no railways in the country. The country has six airports, one of which has commercial and international flights.

== Development projects ==
=== Electricity ===
- Betano Power Station
- Hera Diesel Power Plant

=== Oil and gas ===
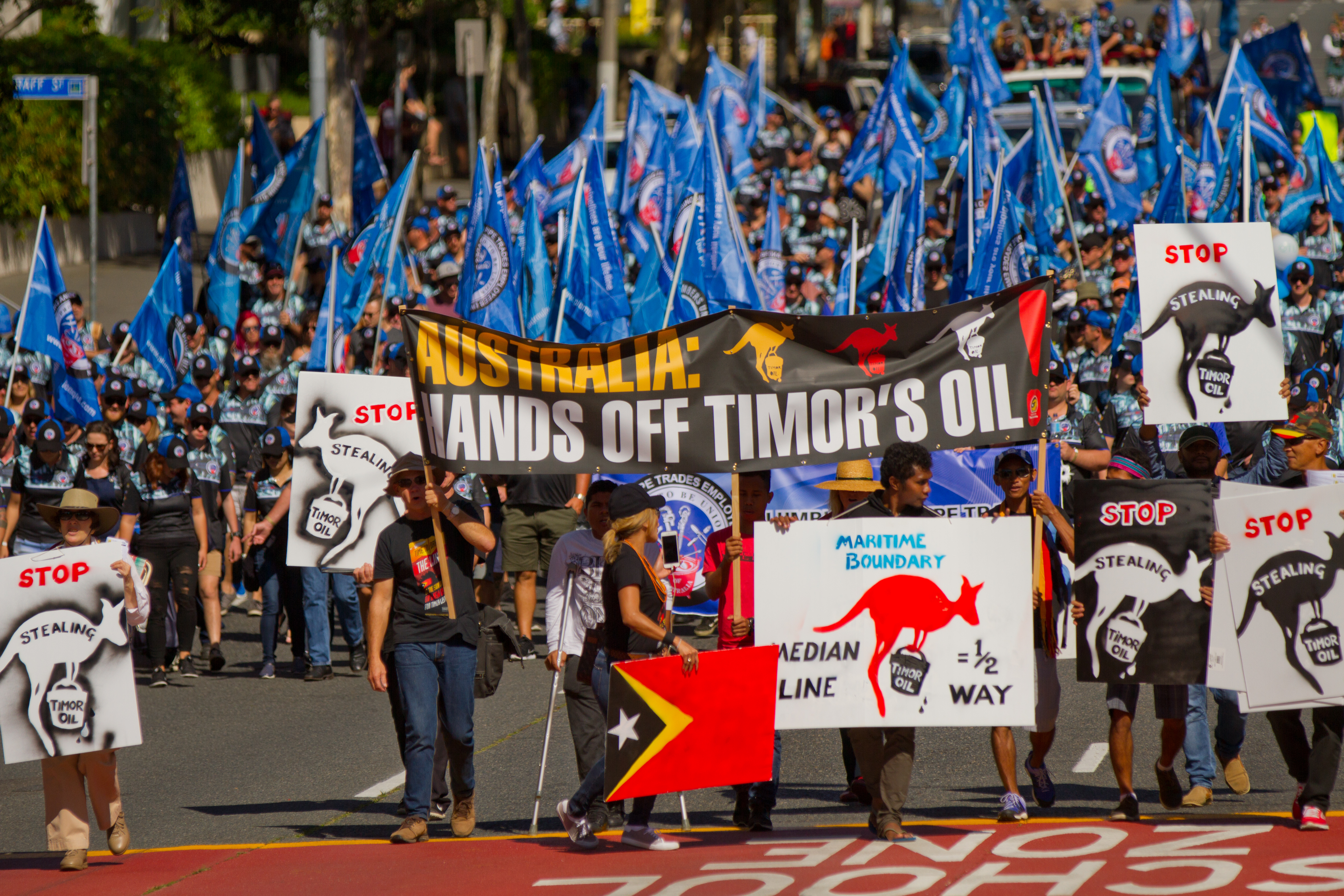
Protesters in Brisbane protesting Australia's claim on East Timorese oil, May 2017

One of Timor-Leste's long-term project is the joint development with Australia of petroleum and natural gas resources in the waters southeast of Timor-Leste.

Timor-Leste inherited no permanent maritime boundaries when it gained independence, repudiating the Timor Gap Treaty as illegal. A provisional agreement (the Timor Sea Treaty, signed when Timor-Leste became independent in 2002) defined a Joint Petroleum Development Area (JPDA), and awarded 90% of revenues from existing projects in that area to Timor-Leste and 10% to Australia. The first significant new development in the JPDA since East Timorese independence is the largest petroleum resource in the Timor Sea, the Greater Sunrise gas field. Its exploitation was the subject of separate agreements in 2003 and 2005. Only 20% of the field lies within the JPDA and the rest in waters not subject to the treaty (though claimed by both countries). The initial, temporary agreement gave 82% of revenues to Australia and only 18% to Timor-Leste.

The government of Timor-Leste has sought to negotiate a definite boundary with Australia at the halfway line between the countries, in accordance with the United Nations Convention on the Law of the Sea. The government of Australia preferred to establish the boundary at the end of the wide Australian continental shelf, as agreed with Indonesia in 1972 and 1991. Normally a dispute such as this would be referred to the International Court of Justice or the International Tribunal for the Law of the Sea for an impartial decision, but the Australian government had withdrawn from these international jurisdictions (solely on matters relating to maritime boundaries) shortly before East Timorese independence.

Nevertheless, under public and diplomatic pressure, the Australian government offered instead a last-minute concession solely on royalties from the Greater Sunrise gas field. An agreement was signed in 2005 under which both countries would set aside the dispute over the maritime boundary, and Timor-Leste would receive 50% of the revenues (estimated at A$26 billion or about US$20 billion over the lifetime of the project) from the Greater Sunrise development. Other developments within waters claimed by Timor-Leste but outside the JPDA (Laminaria-Corallina and Buffalo) continue to be exploited unilaterally by Australia, however.

Some proceeds from Timor-Leste's petroleum royalties are directed to the country's sovereign wealth fund, the Timor-Leste Petroleum Fund.
