= Energy in Timor-Leste =

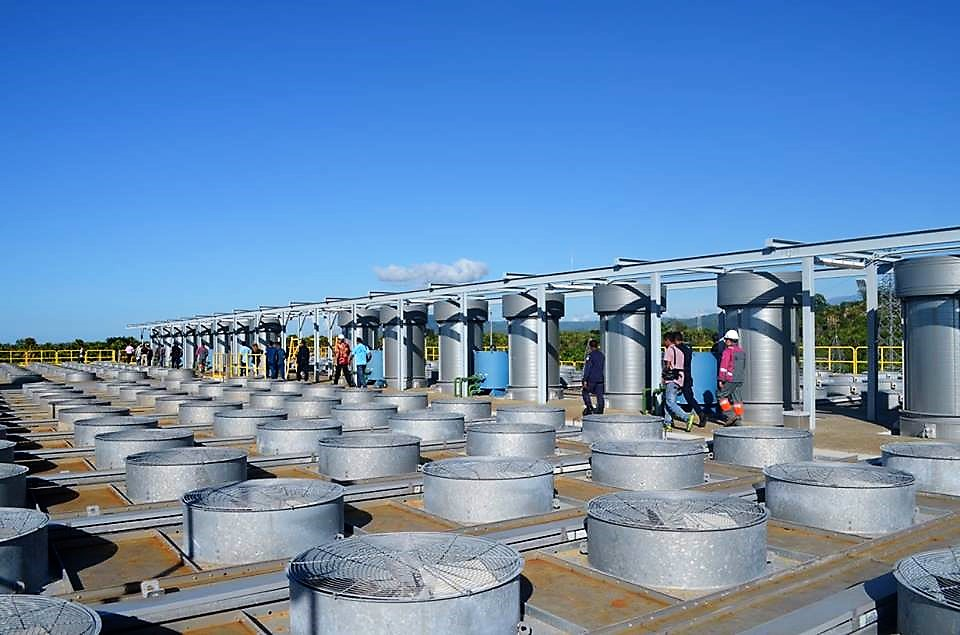
Betano Power Station, powered by imported fuel oil

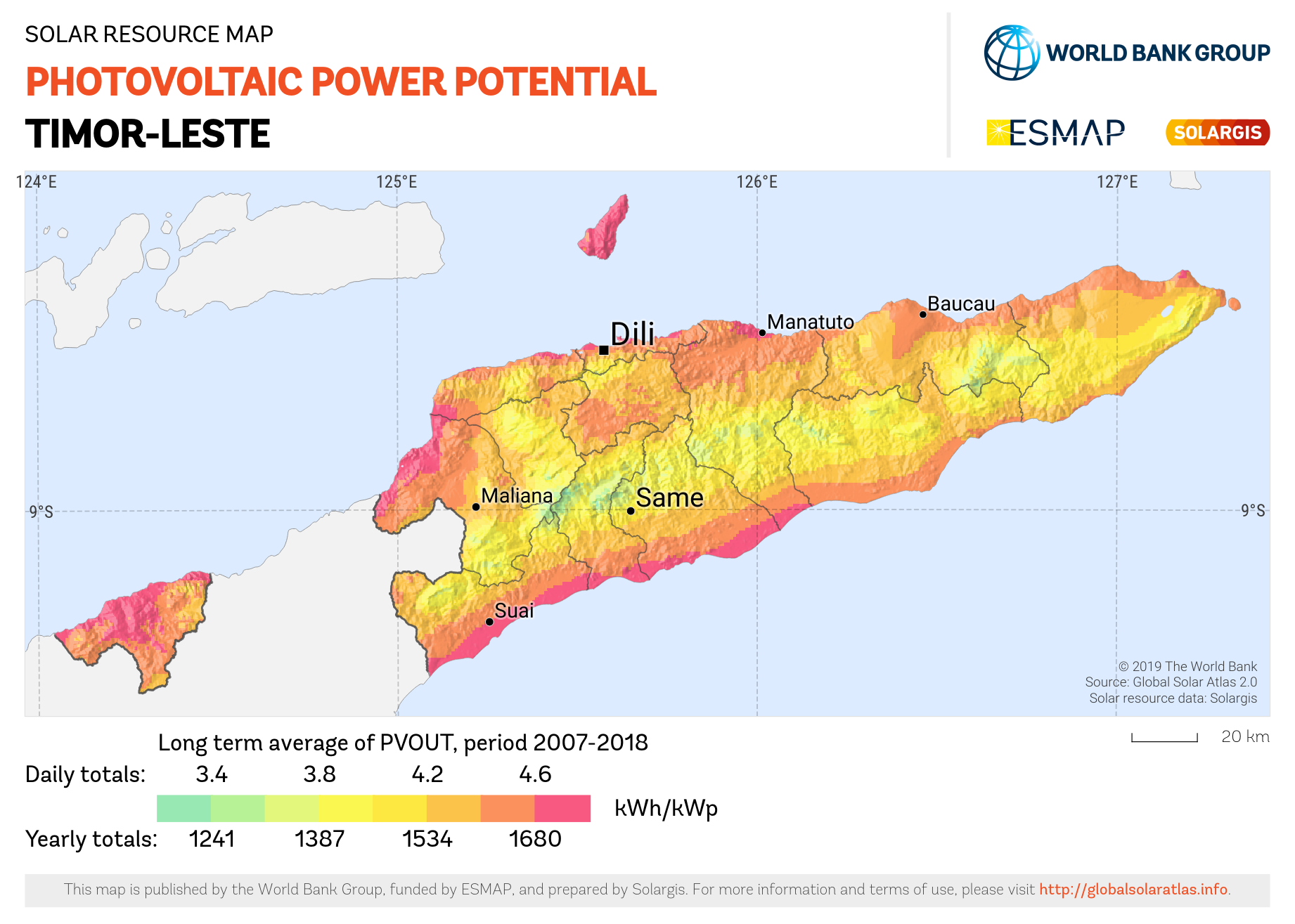
Map of Timor-Leste with photovoltaic potential shaded; as can be seen, it is very high, especially near the coast.

Energy in Timor-Leste is expensive, a serious problem in a country as poor as Timor-Leste. In 2005, the government identified the high price of electricity (US$0.20 per kWh) as a deterrent to development. The country relies heavily on petroleum imports as its main source of energy. According to Worldometers, in 2024 99.8% of electricity generation came from fossil fuels.

Most of the energy infrastructure was destroyed by Indonesian and anti-independence militias during the 1999 East Timorese crisis before Timor-Leste gained its independence. However, the government is rebuilding its infrastructure post-independence, gained in 2002, and attempting to develop renewable energy production.

A feasibility study of 2007–2010 concluded that the country had huge potential for renewable energy. However, Gariuai Hydroelectric Plant is the country's only such plant, with a production capacity of 326 kW. In 2026, it was announced that the World Bank Group, the Asian Development Bank, Canada and the Japan International Cooperation Agency were teaming up to fund "Timor-Leste's first utility-scale solar and battery storage project", the country's "first independent power producer project".

There are vast natural gas fields under the Timor Sea; exploitation of these was and is being hindered by disputes with neighbor Australia over their ownership and development. For example, the Treaty on Certain Maritime Arrangements in the Timor Sea was signed in 2006 and terminated by Timor-Leste in 2017.

In 2023, the average energy consumption per person was 368 kWh, compared to a world average of 3794. According to the United Nations, accessibility to electricity rose from 17.8% of the population in 2000 to 94.3% in 2024.

== See also ==
- List of power stations in Timor-Leste
- List of renewable energy topics by country
- Rural electrification
