= Economy of Timor =

The Economy of Timor is covered in the following articles:

- Economy of Timor-Leste (formerly East Timor)
- Economy of West Timor

== See also ==
- Economy of Indonesia
