= List of power stations in Timor-Leste =

The following lists power stations in Timor-Leste.

The Hera power station was built to supply to the north coast of the country, while the Betano power station supplies electricity to the south coast and the Inur Sakato thermal power station provides electricity to the Oecusse District.

Name	Location	District	Coordinates	Type	Total capacity (MW)	Opened	Ref
Betano Power Station	northeast of Betano	Manufahi	9°9′12″S 125°44′7″E	Fuel oil	136	20 August 2013	
Hera Diesel Power Plant	15 km east of Dili	Dili	8°32′26″S 125°41′26″E	Fuel oil	119	28 November 2011	
Inur Sakato	13 km west of the international airport in Oecusse	Oecusse	9°10′11″S 124°25′42″E	Fuel oil	17.3	?	
Gariuai Hydroelectric Plant	Gariuai	Baucau	8°34′37.25″S 126°25′34.50″E	Hydro	0.326	November 2008	

== See also ==
- Energy in Timor-Leste
