= Oil reserves in the United Arab Emirates =

Coordinates: 24°58′29″N 53°40′47″E

Oil reserves in the United Arab Emirates, according to its government, are about 107 billion barrels, almost as big as Kuwait's claimed reserves. As of 2017, the Emirate of Abu Dhabi had most of the oil with 92 billion barrels (14.6×10^{9} m^{3}) while the Emirate of Dubai had 4 billion barrels (640×10^{6} m^{3}) and the Emirate of Sharjah had 1.5 billion barrels (240×10^{6} m^{3}). Most of the oil is in the Zakum field which is the third largest in the Middle East with an estimated 66 billion barrels (10.5×10^{9} m^{3}). The UAE produces about 2.9 million barrels per day (460×10^{3} m^{3}/d) of total oil liquids.
