= Electricity sector in Guyana =

Electricity sector of Guyana
Data
- Electricity coverage: 60% (total); (LAC total average in 2007: 92%)
- Installed capacity (2007): 226MW
- Share of fossil energy: ~100%
- Share of renewable energy: 0%
- GHG emissions from electricity generation (2005): 1.58 Mt CO_{2}
- Average electricity use (2007): ~1,080kWh per capita
- Distribution losses (2007): ~40%; (LAC average in 2005: 13.6%)

Consumption by sector (% of total)
- Residential: 42.2%
- Industrial: 31.8%

Tariffs and financing
- Average residential tariff (US$/kW·h, 2008): 0.246-0.273; (LAC average in 2005: 0.115)
- Average industrial tariff (US$/kW·h, 2008): 0.276-0.320; (LAC average in 2005: 0.107)
- Average commercial tariff (US$/kW·h, 2008): 0.355

Services
- Sector unbundling: No
- Share of private sector in generation: 45%
- Competitive supply to large users: No
- Competitive supply to residential users: No

Institutions
- No. of service providers: 3 (generation), 1 (transmission, distribution)
- Responsibility for regulation: Public Utilities Commission (PUC)
- Responsibility for policy-setting: Guyana Energy Agency (GEA)
- Responsibility for the environment: Environmental Protection Agency (EPA)
- Electricity sector law: Yes (1994)
- Renewable energy law: No
- CDM transactions related to the electricity sector: 1 registered CDM projects, 44,733 t CO_{2}e annual emissions reductions

The electricity sector in Guyana is dominated by Guyana Power and Light (GPL), the state-owned vertically integrated utility. Although the country has a large potential for hydroelectric and bagasse-fueled power generation, most of its 226 MW of installed capacity correspond to thermoelectric diesel-engine driven generators.

Reliability or electricity supply is very low, linked both to technical and institutional deficiencies in the sector, with total losses close to 40% and commercial losses of about 30%. This low reliability has led most firms to install their own diesel generators, which in turn leads to higher than average electricity costs.

== Electricity supply and demand ==
Guyana electricity production by source

Installed power generation capacity in Guyana in 2007 was 226 MW or 0.4 kW per capita, which is lower than in other countries in the region and is hardly sufficient to cover the current demand for electricity in the country. Most electricity generation uses Diesel engines to drive generators. There are plans for introduction of power generation facilities based on renewable resources, but these would still account for only a small share (10 percent) of the generation capacity in the country.

Self-generation is widely spread in Guyana, where 100%, 82% and 37% of large, medium and small firms respectively own generators which supply them with 64%, 54% and 31% respectively of the total electricity consumed. A side effect of self-supply of energy is that the corporate demand for electricity in some regions of the country has decreased significantly. While private generation temporarily eases the pressures on the overall capacity for the sector, it also prevents the realization of economies of scale at a system level. Self-provision of energy appears more costly to companies (up to US$0.38 per KWh) than regional and even local tariffs (around US$0.22 and US$0.25 respectively on average).

In 2007, electricity supplied to the grid was 833 GWh, shared among generators as follows:

Generator	Electricity generated (GWh)
Guyana Power & Light (GPL)	551
Guyana Sugar Corporation	267
BERMINE/AMC	15

Source: Guyana Energy Agency, Statistics

While the consumption of electricity has increased substantially in the past few years, the installed generation and distribution capacity has increased at a lower pace. Obviously, self-generation has played an important role to fill the gap between consumption and generation of electricity. The low income in the country, high cost per kilowatt hour and low level of Guyana's rural electrification leads to use of kerosene, wood and charcoal still playing an important factor.

== Access to electricity ==
Access to electricity is usually constrained by a country's level of income; however, in the case of Guyana, it is estimated that the electricity system in Guyana services only about 60 percent of the population, well below the level achieved by many regional peers. Similarly, while electrification is higher in coastal towns with a high industry concentration, there are vast areas of the country that appear underserved on this account. Even companies within regional access to the grid have to wait up to 99 days for connection.

== Service quality ==
=== Service interruptions ===
Reliability of electricity supply is low, and characterized by frequent and long outages (the highest incidence in Latin America and the Caribbean), load discharges and voltage variations. Poor reliability has been linked to dependence on old and obsolete equipment for power generation, underinvestment in the distribution grid, and lack of incentives for efficient provision of service. The poor quality of electricity supply becomes a key obstacle to growth. For example, companies’ losses attributable to energy outages are estimated to reach up to four percent of their total sales on average. Since large firms can afford to invest on own power generation equipment, these losses are smaller for them than for small firms.

=== Distribution and transmission losses ===
In 2005, losses at the distribution level accounted for almost 40 percent of the energy generated, well above the 13.5% weighted average for LAC. At a commercialization level, the utility has failed to enforce collection of bills, and to eradicate theft and corruption in under billing of the service. GPL initiated a loss reduction plan in 2006, but by 2012 and on still faces continual challenges due to an "ingrained culture of electricity theft" and illegal connections.

== Responsibilities in the electricity sector ==
=== Policy and regulation ===
The legal, regulatory and institutional framework for the electricity sector includes:

Office of the Prime Minister has principal policy-making and regulatory responsibility in the sector, including for granting licences to the public utilities and independent power producers and approval of development and expansion plans and of operating standards and performance targets for Guyana Power & Light (GPL), the principal supplier.

Guyana Energy Agency (GEA) is the successor of the Guyana National Energy Authority (GEA). The GEA came into operation on 1 June 1998 by appointment of the Minister; it is responsible for all energy related matters. It is the mandate of the GEA "To ensure the rational and efficient use of imported petroleum-based energy sources, while encouraging, where economically feasible and environmentally acceptable, increased utilization of indigenous new and renewable sources of energy."

Public Utilities Commission is the multi-sector independent regulatory agency with authority to set rates, develop regulations and resolve disputes.

=== Generation, transmission and distribution ===
GPL dominates the electricity sector in Guyana as a vertically integrated government-owned utility with a monopolistic position on transmission and distribution, and a major stake (55%) in generation. The fragile financial position of GPL (due mainly to heavy system losses and high exposure to oil prices) constrains its investment capacity on essential maintenance and improvement of generation plants and transmission lines and grid. GPL faces financial difficulties due to a combination of net operating losses (i.e. tariffs below costs) and high commercial losses.

== Sector policy ==
The “Energy Policy of Guyana,” completed in 1994, advocates the replacement of imported petroleum, as far as possible, by indigenous renewable energy sources. Increased and more efficient use of domestic energy resources, primarily hydropower and bagasse for electricity generation, is envisaged to contribute significantly in this regard. A System Development Plan prepared by GPL in 2000 and its 2007-2011 Development and Expansion Programme reflected the official government policy of utilizing Guyana's renewable energy resources such as biomass and hydropower.

Meanwhile, the sector policy has also relied on the encouragement of private sector participation in building a healthy market-oriented economy. The policy envisaged that Independent Power Producers, which are investor-owned enterprises involved in power generation, will be encouraged. Additional policies are certainly needed to strengthen the energy sector.

== Renewable energy ==
=== Hydroelectricity ===
Guyana has a massive but yet unrealized potential for hydropower generation. Hydropower generation capacity has been estimated at 7,600 MW, that is, more than 30 times the current installed capacity in the country. Feasibility studies have been carried out for specific projects, but up to now, this potential remains untapped, mainly due to the considerable capital investments required to set up new power facilities. Indeed, beside the actual investment in generation plants, transmission lines would also be required, as most of the generation potential is inland, far from the zones of heaviest demand along the coast.

The 100MW Amaila Falls Hydroelectric Project on the Kuribrong River was planned in 2011. However, the project was far costlier than expected.

=== Bagasse ===
Guyana has opportunities for electricity generation based on renewable resources linked to its large sugar industry. Electricity can be generated using bagasse, a by-product of sugar production, as basic fuel for thermoelectric facilities. Bagasse generation benefits from lower and more stable cost of than oil-based generation, as well as lower carbon emissions. A major bagasse co-generation project was implemented in 2006 by the Guyana Sugar Corporation. This project expanded power generation capacity by a further 25 MW (15 MW bagasse-based and 10 MW diesel-based) through an investment of US$27 million in a bagasse co-generation scheme. One third of the new capacity was allocated to the local grid through a power purchase agreement.

Because of its climate, Guyana has a large potential for sugarcane crops, as well as a large sugar industry that could benefit from additional revenue opportunities such as energy generation. Even though it may not be feasible to meet Guyana's power demand with bagasse-based facilities, they can help to reduce the reliance of the sector on imported oil, while having a positive environmental impact through reduced carbon emissions. However, an important constraint to Guyana's bagasse-based generation potential is the lack of year-round supply of bagasse, which means that a substantial investment in storage and hauling would be required.

=== Wind ===
The potential for wind-based generation is considered to be significant, although no comprehensive studies have been carried out. The Guyana Energy Agency reported a pilot project for a wind turbine in Guyana's east coast. This is a small project with expected energy savings of around US$30,000, and a payback period of 40 months. However, no major projects are being put in place. Other Caribbean countries such as Barbados and St. Lucia have promoted the use of such renewable energy sources through initiatives that include the removal of taxes and import tariffs on wind-farm equipment.

== History of the electricity sector ==
Electricity generation in Guyana was mainly done by large corporate entitles, for processing bauxite or sugar. Residential use was limited to larger cities, such as Georgetown and New Amsterdam and provided by independent companies. International Power Company of Canada operated in Guyana at the turn of the 20th century until assets were bought by Demerara Electric Company in 1925. This was then purchased by British Guiana Electricity Company in 1960, until 1966 when a nationalization policy turned over assets to the government. This company eventually became known as GPL. An attempt to privatize happened in 1992, but has since been returned to full government control.

== Tariffs ==
Electricity prices in Guyana are the third highest in the Caribbean due in large part to the country's reliance on expensive imported oil for electricity generation. At present the cost of fuel accounts for up to 60 percent of the total cost of electricity generation. Recent oil price hikes are passed on to consumers, as logically part of such increases in production inputs would be reflected in the price that consumers have to pay.

An announced tariff reform will aim to rebalance the loads between industrial and domestic use through an increase in the domestic tariff, and a reduction of the industrial tariff. The new tariff structure will be implemented within a timeframe of 4 to 5 years after its approval by the Prime Minister.

Tariffs effective February 2008 are:

- Residential: 0.246 to 0.273 US$/kWh ( weighted average for LAC in 2005: 0.105
- Commercial: US$0.355/kWh
- Industrial: 0.276 to 0.320 US$/kWh ( weighted average for LAC in 2005: 0.1075)
- Government: 0.283 to 0.370 US$/kWh

== Investment and financing ==
Reduction of Guyana's reliance on imported oil and the improvement of energy efficiency will require large investments that will impact on the fiscal stability of the country. The World Bank estimates that an increase in electricity intensity in Guyana at a level comparable with peer Caribbean countries would require investments over the next 10 years of between US$805 million and US$1,497 million (or between 10 and 19 percent of its GDP). However, under the current ownership structure of the system, this level of investment would pose a significant burden on the Government of Guyana, and would create considerable debt sustainability concerns.

Installed capacity is expected to increase by 62.5 MW in the period 2007-2009, as part of a US$120 million plan for future development managed by GPL. This plan also aims to address issues of distribution (through the construction of transmission lines and enhancement of the network) and efficiency.

== Private sector participation in the electricity sector ==
Independent Power Producers own and operate 45 percent of the installed generation capacity, which is thermoelectric. The table below shows the generation share compared with GPL:

Company	Installed capacity (MW) (1)
Guyana Power and Light (GPL)	126
Omai Gold Mines Ltd. (OGM)	47
Guyana Sugar Corporation (GSC)	37
Linden Power Company (LPC)	8
Berbice Mining Enterprise (BERMINE)	4
Aroaima Mining Company (AMC)	4
Total	226

Source: World Bank, 2007

(1) In 2005-2007, only GPL, GSC, BERMINE and AMC have sold electricity to the grid.

In the last few years, there have been formal efforts to enhance the relationships between private production and GPL; these include co-generation projects, plans for Power Purchase Agreements (PPAs), and explicit interest government interest in renewable energy projects. The expectations for capacity growth are reliant on the participation of these independent producers.

A significant enhancement of the regulatory framework will be required in order to ensure the viability of GPL as a potential private venture, and to encourage further private investment. While private participation is desirable, it may also not lead to significant improvements when regulatory capacity is weak and enforcement of contracts is insecure, as is the case in Guyana.

=== Summary of private sector participation ===
Subsector	Private participation (%)
Generation	45
Transmission	0
Distribution	0

== Electricity and the environment ==
The Environmental Protection Agency (EPA) is the institution in charge of environmental issues in Guyana, focusing on effective environmental management and protection and the sustainable use of Guyana's natural resources.

Guyana emitted 1.58 million tons of CO_{2} in 2005, which corresponds to 2.07 tCO_{2} per capita annually.

Currently (September 2008), there in one CDM registered project in the electricity sector in Guyana, the Skeldon Bagasse Cogeneration Project. Average emission reductions for this project have been estimated at 44,733 tCO_{2}e.

== External assistance ==
=== Inter-American Development Bank ===
The Inter-American Development Bank (IDB) is supporting several projects in the electricity sector:

- Unserved Areas Electrification Program: supported through a US$27.4 million loan approved in 2002, it aims to accelerate electricity sector development and extension of service to currently unserved consumers.
- Power Sector Support Program: through a US$12 million loan approved in December 2007, this program aims to support the development of the power sector by means of promoting reduction of electricity losses, while including reforms and strengthening measures to the regulatory framework, strengthening and development of the power utility provider, and social awareness programs, among others, in order to achieve sustainable solutions.
- Strengthening Electricity Sector Regulation in Support of Private Investment: technical assistance (July 2008)
- Expanding Bioenergy Opportunities in Guyana: US$675,500 technical assistance aims to improve the capacity of the Government to better respond to project proposals related to non-traditional energy sources, with particular emphasis on bioenergy and to increase capacity within the Government in relation to bio-energy technology and research.

== See also ==
- Guyana
- Economy of Guyana
- Water supply and sanitation in Guyana

== Sources ==
- Guyana Power and Light, 2006. Annual Report
