= Oil reserves in Spain =

The oil reserves of Spain have been little exploited but major inshore and offshore deposits were discovered in the late 20th century and early 21st century. There are oil deposits in Burgos (Ayoluengo oil field), Córdoba, the south shore, Cádiz, Sevilla, Jaén, Asturias, Tarragona, Valencia and Canarias. The Tarragona oil deposits, which lie offshore, include the Lubina and Montanazo deposits, all located within the Casablanca oilfield, discovered in 1975, and the largest find in Spain until the 21st century. The Viura gas field was discovered in 2010 in La Rioja, near Logroño; it contains 3 billion cubic meters of natural gas.

Reserves in the oilfields offshore the Canary Islands are estimated at 500 million barrels of crude. In total, in 2014 it was estimated that Spain holds 2.5 billion cubic meters of natural gas and 2 billion barrels of petroleum.

== Size and market value ==
The Ilustre Colegio Oficial de Geólogos (Distinguished Royal College of Geologists), states that Spain could supply itself with crude for 20 years and 70 years of natural gas. In 2022, it was estimated that the value of the already identified gas deposits was €700,000 million, plus €150,000 million for the oil; it was also predicted, that should exploitation begin in earnest, by 2040 the annual economic contribution would be of €44,400 million per year —larger than the GDP contribution of agriculture, or of transportation. The Consejo Superior de Colegios de Ingenieros de Minas (High Council of Associations of Mining Engineers) in 2022 estimated recoverable gas reserves at 40 years of annual national consumption, i.e., 1,300 million cubic meters.

== History of exploration and production ==
In modern times, hydrocarbon exploration and extraction dates back to 1860. Scientific drilling based on geological principles began in 1940, by CAMPSA and by CIEPSA, a subsidiary of CEPSA. VALDEBRO, a U.S.-Spain consortium brought noteworthy technical advances after 1952. The first commercial success was Castillo-1 (1960), inland Álava, in the Cantabrian-Basque oil region. A consortium of Unión Fenosa, Sociedad de Hidrocarburos de Euskadi and Oil Gas Skills found the 3-bn cu-m Viura gas field in 2010.

As of 2018, Ayoluengo was the only onshore commercially exploited oil field of Spain (and the only one in the entire Iberian Peninsula); the operating company requested a license extension to continue production but in November that year it was asked to remove its equipment. The Casablanca platform in the Mediterranean, the final Spanish producer, closed in June 2021.

== Non-traditional oil deposits ==
Oil condensate deposits lie in the Basque-Cantabrian basin, in the Liassic, i.e., the Lower Jurassic stratum.
