= Hera Diesel Power Plant =

Power plant in Dili, Timor-Leste

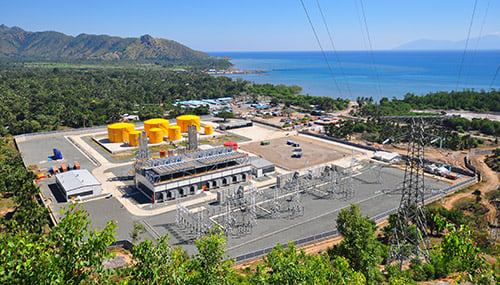
- Country: Timor-Leste
- Location: Cristo Rei, Dili
- Coordinates: 8°32′24.7″S 125°41′24.5″E
- Status: Operational
- Construction began: February 2009
- Commission date: December 2011
- Owner: Electricidade de Timor-Leste
- Operator: Wärtsilä

Thermal power station
- Primary fuel: Diesel fuel

Power generation
- Nameplate capacity: 119 MW

External links
- Commons: Related media on Commons

Hera Diesel Power Plant is a 119 MW oil-fired generating station on the coast at Hera, about 15 km east of Dili in Timor-Leste. Built under the 2008 National Electricity Project and owned by state utility EDTL, it forms one half of the country's twin-site diesel base load system together with the Betano plant, supplying the bulk of Timor-Leste's grid power and acting as a strategic reserve while policymakers explore gas conversion and expanded renewables.

== Development and commissioning ==
Construction began in February 2009 after the government selected Hera as the northern hub of its nation-wide electrification programme. Seven generator sets arrived in September 2011, and commercial operation started early in 2012, making Hera the first utility-scale source of baseload power for the northern grid. A 29 September 2017 agreement appointed Wärtsilä to ensure long-term energy availability and undertake full operations and maintenance (O&M).

== Plant configuration and operations ==
The station uses seven Wärtsilä 18V46 medium-speed reciprocating engines that can run on diesel or heavy fuel oil, giving a net capacity of 119.5 MW and exporting power through a 150 kV switch-yard to the national transmission ring. Together with the 136 MW Betano plant, Hera supplies more than 90 percent of utility electricity and consumes roughly three-quarters of Timor-Leste's imported petroleum. Generation costs in 2021 averaged US$0.35–0.45 per kWh—two to three times the regulated tariff—so the fleet operates with substantial government subsidy. An Asian Development Bank study presented in 2023 noted that all engines are technically convertible to natural gas and that EDTL is assessing this option to curb fuel costs and emissions. Wärtsilä continues to hold the O&M contract, renewed in July 2012.

== Environmental, community and economic considerations ==
In 2011 The New Humanitarian reported that local communities were frustrated by the absence of a published environmental impact assessment and by minimal consultation despite the plant's €300-million cost. The Haburas Foundation attempted, unsuccessfully, to halt construction in court, citing risks from noise, air pollution and possible marine fuel spills. Civil-society groups continue to call for transparent emissions data and clearer hazardous-waste contingency plans. Government energy strategy nonetheless assigns Hera a pivotal role until at least 2035, after which increased solar capacity and potential gas conversion are expected gradually to displace diesel while retaining the engines as rapid-start reserves for grid stability.

== See also ==
- List of power stations in Timor-Leste
