= Corruption in Guyana =

Corruption in Guyana remains a significant concern for the republic, requiring ongoing efforts to combat the problem. The country's 2024 ranking in Transparency International’s Corruption Perceptions Index was 92nd place and its rating, which stands at 39 out of 100, has declined from 41 since 2020. Persistent corruption issues include bribery, embezzlement, and misappropriation of public funds.

== Corruption issues ==
=== Police Force ===
According to Robeson Benn, the Minister of Home Affairs, the procurement process in the Guyana Police Force (GPF) has been a source of corruption and remains the biggest immediate problem within the organization. Recent reports demonstrated that high-profile officers were implicated in allegations of corruption such as Assistant Police Commissioner Calvin Brutus. He has been investigated for alleged financial improprieties and has been on leave since July 2024. Charges of corruption within the police force has already attracted the attention of NGOs such as the Georgetown Chamber of Commerce and Industry as well as the United States Embassy in Guyana. Benn also cited similar corruption challenges in the cases of Guyana Fire Service and Guyana Prison Service.

=== Corruption in the oil industry ===
A problematic area that creates incidences of corruption in Guyana is petroleum licensing and contracting transactions. In 2015, the discovery of vast oil reserves off the coast of the country provided significant potential to Guyana's economic development. Presently, oil has already generated $1 billion in annual revenue and this figure is estimated to reach $7.5 billion by 2040. The influx of wealth, however, also created opportunities for corruption. This is demonstrated in the case of ExxonMobil.

ExxonMobil holds a license to extract oil resources in Guyana. However, as is the case in its global operations, it often outsources the bulk of the work from contractors to get natural resources out of the ground. According to the Natural Resource Governance Institute (NRGI), this practice creates corruption risks in the operations of these suppliers such as bribery, favoritism, and state capture. This is highlighted by reports that suppliers, which have been contracted in Guyana, such as Saipem, Halliburton, and SBM Offshore have been involved in corrupt practices in their respective operations elsewhere in order to gain advantages.

The state-owned Guyana Oil Company (GUYOIL) was also cited in a report by the Auditor General in 2021 for alleged impropriety lodged by Jayson Aaron and his company, Aaron Royalty Inc. Although the report did not cite any laws broken over a claimed assurance of a contract, it noted that the company's officials violated standards and procedures for procuring fuel and recommended disciplinary actions.

== Anti-corruption measures ==
The legal framework that addresses and penalizes corruption in Guyana includes the Integrity Commission Act, State Assets Recovery Act, and the Audit Act. Observers see a need to introduce more reforms such as the establishment of an agency that can investigate and prosecute corrupt practices, the implementation of the Freedom of Information Act, and the passage of key corruption legislation, among others. The Integrity Commission Act, for instance, was only reconstituted in 2022. While it can collect asset declarations from public officials, its mandate is limited to reporting irregularities for other authorities to investigate.

Recently, Guyana has instituted more measures to address corruption. The National Tender & Procurement Administration, for instance, has already established guidelines for public procurement procedures. In 2021, the National Coordinating Committee on Anti-Corruption was also established. This body monitors and facilitates Guyana's commitments to regional and international anti-corruption treaties, conventions, and agreements. Guyana Vice President Bharrat Jagdeo has also thrown his support behind the proposal to require a prequalifying exam for contractors to prevent corrupt practices.

== International rankings ==
Transparency International's 2025 Corruption Perceptions Index gave Guyana a score of 40 on a scale from 0 ("highly corrupt") to 100 ("very clean"). When ranked by score, Guyana ranked 84th among the 182 countries in the Index, where the country ranked first is perceived to have the most honest public sector. For comparison with regional scores, the best score among the countries of the Americas (Note: Argentina, Bahamas, Barbados, Belize, Bolivia, Brazil, Canada, Chile, Colombia, Costa Rica, Cuba, Dominica, Dominican Republic, Ecuador, El Salvador, Grenada, Guatemala, Guyana, Haiti, Honduras, Jamaica, Mexico, Nicaragua, Panama, Paraguay, Peru, Saint Lucia, Saint Vincent and the Grenadines, Suriname, Trinidad and Tobago, United States of America, Uruguay, Venezuela) was 75, the average score was 42 and the worst score was 10. In 2026, Transparency International described Guyana as one of only two countries in the Americas (along with the Dominican Republic) that has significantly improved its score since the current scoring system began in 2012. For comparison with worldwide scores, the best score was 89 (ranked 1), the average score was 42, and the worst score was 9 (ranked 181, in a two-way tie).
