= Oil reserves in Kuwait =

Petroleum reserves located in Kuwait

Oil reserves in Kuwait make up 8% of the oil reserves in the world. Kuwait is OPEC's third largest oil producer and claims to hold approximately 104 billion barrels (16.5×10^{9} m^{3}). This includes half of the 5 billion barrels (790×10^{6} m^{3}) in the Saudi-Kuwaiti neutral zone, which Kuwait shares with Saudi Arabia. Most of Kuwait's oil reserves are located in the 70 billion barrels (11×10^{9} m^{3}) Burgan field, the second largest conventional oil field in the world, which has been producing oil since 1938. Since most of Kuwait's major oil fields are over 60 years old, maintaining production rates is becoming a problem.

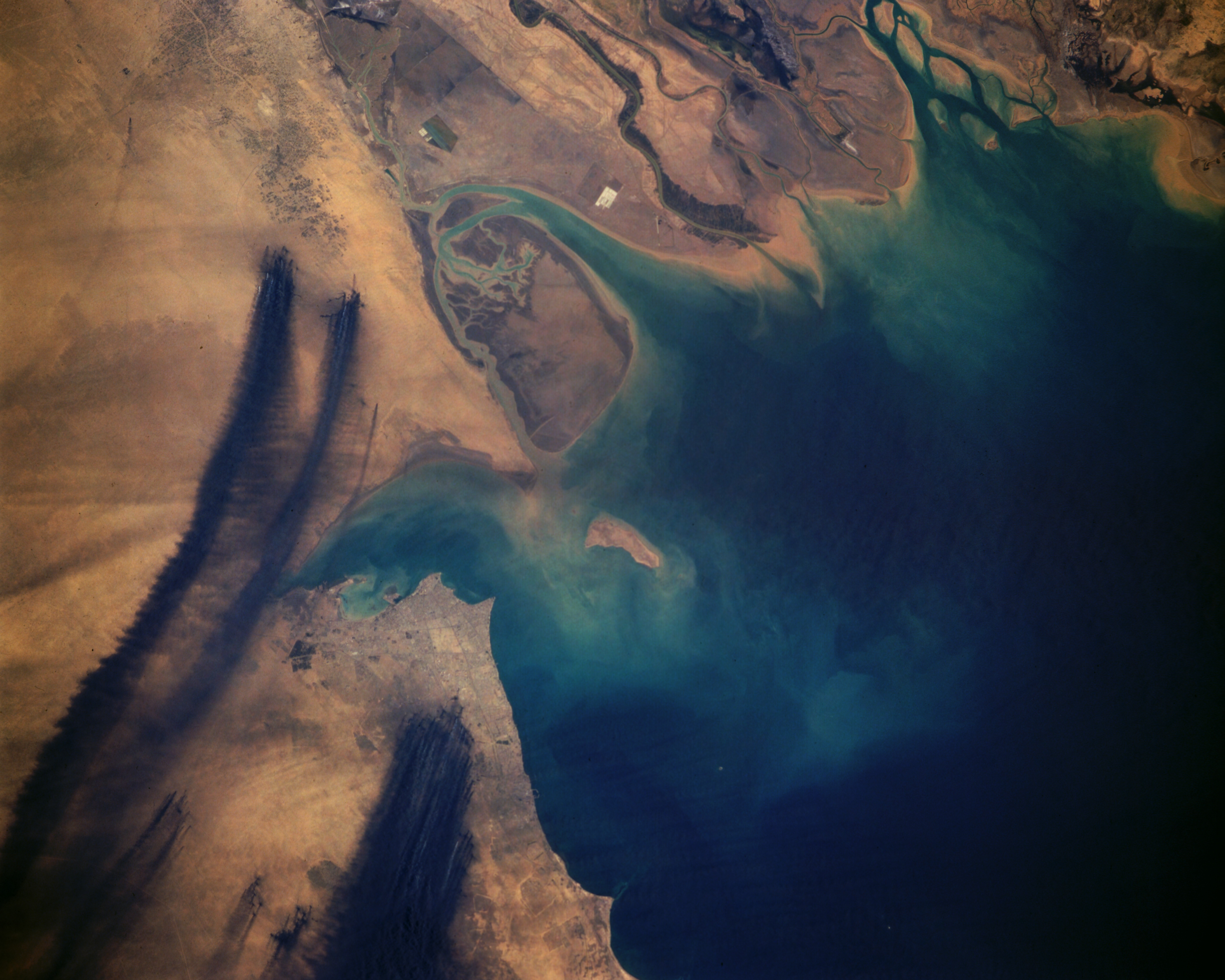
Smoke from burning Kuwait oil fields after Iraqi forces set fire to them during the Gulf War.

During Operation Desert Storm when the Iraqi Armed Forces were retreating from Kuwait, Saddam Hussein ordered a team of engineers to enact a scorched earth policy and set fire to hundreds of oil fields which caused over one billion barrels of oil to go up in flames over the next seven months. At their height, the fires consumed more than four million barrels of oil per day.
