= Betano Power Station =

Oil power station in East Timor

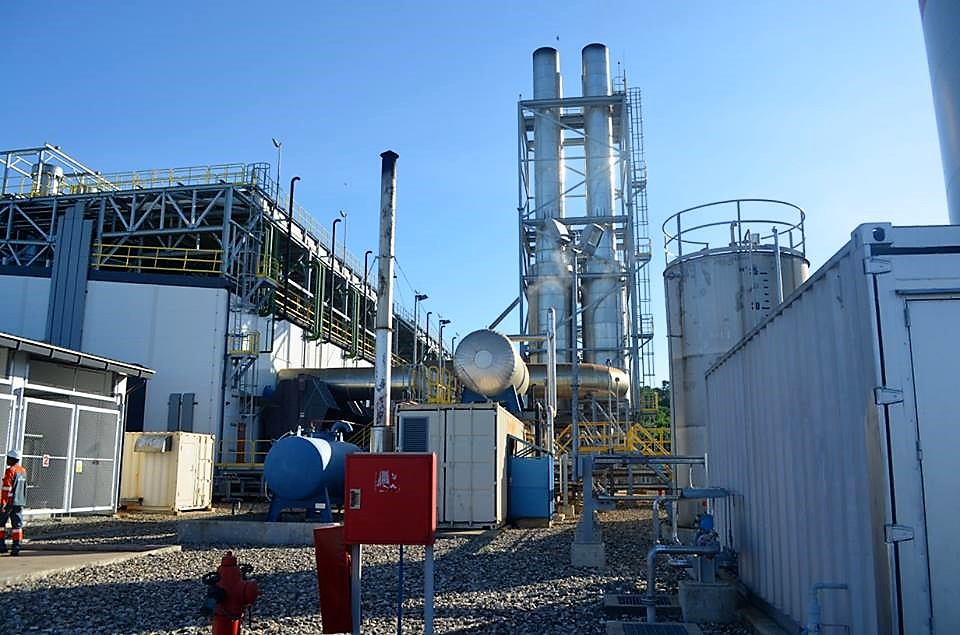
- Official name: Central Eléctrica de Betano
- Country: Timor-Leste
- Location: Betano
- Coordinates: 9°9′12.87″S 125°44′6.9468″E
- Status: Operational
- Commission date: August 20, 2013
- Owner: Electricidade de Timor-Leste
- Operator: Puri Akraya Engineering Ltd

Thermal power station
- Primary fuel: Fuel oil
- Tertiary fuel: Natural gas
- Turbine technology: Reciprocating Internal Combustion Engine

Power generation
- Units operational: 8 x 17 MW
- Nameplate capacity: 136 MW

External links
- Commons: Related media on Commons

The Betano Power Station (Portuguese: Central Eléctrica de Betano) is an oil power station located northeast of Betano, in the Manufahi District of Timor-Leste. It was built to supply the South coast of Timor-Leste with electricity, while the North coast is supplied by the Hera power station.

The power station was inaugurated on August 20, 2013. It has a total output of 136 MW, supplied by eight Wärtsilä 18V46 engine generators. For comparison, the capacity of the Hera power station is slightly lower at 119 MW.

The power station was built by China Nuclear Industry 22nd Construction Company (CNI22). It is owned by Electricidade de Timor-Leste (EDTL), but operated by the Indonesian company Puri Akraya Engineering Ltd. In October 2017, Wartsilä signed a new five-year contract for maintenance of the power station.

As of January 2017, the station runs on light fuel oil, but heavy fuel oil and natural gas can be used as alternatives.

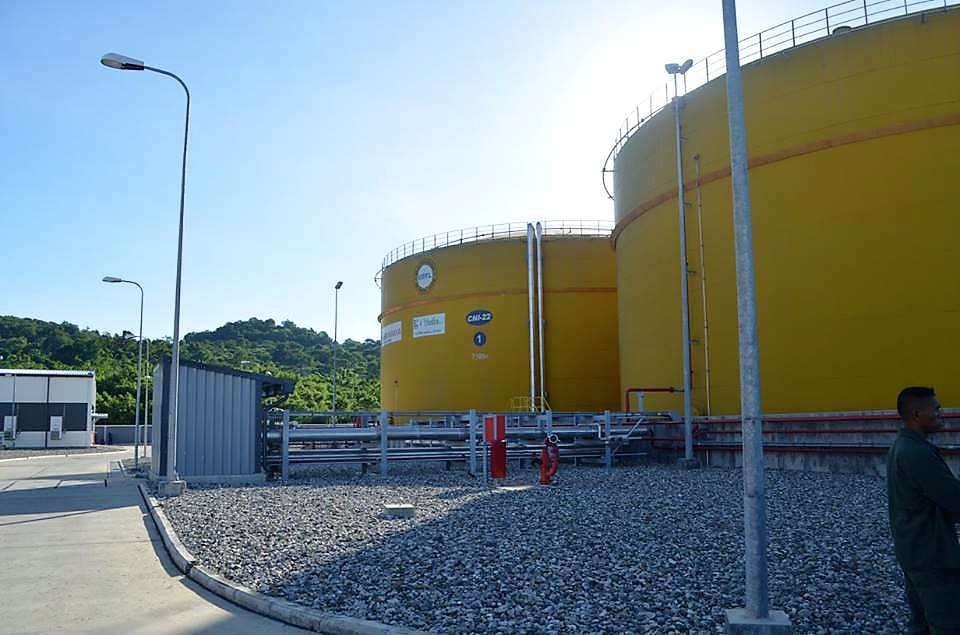
Oil tanks

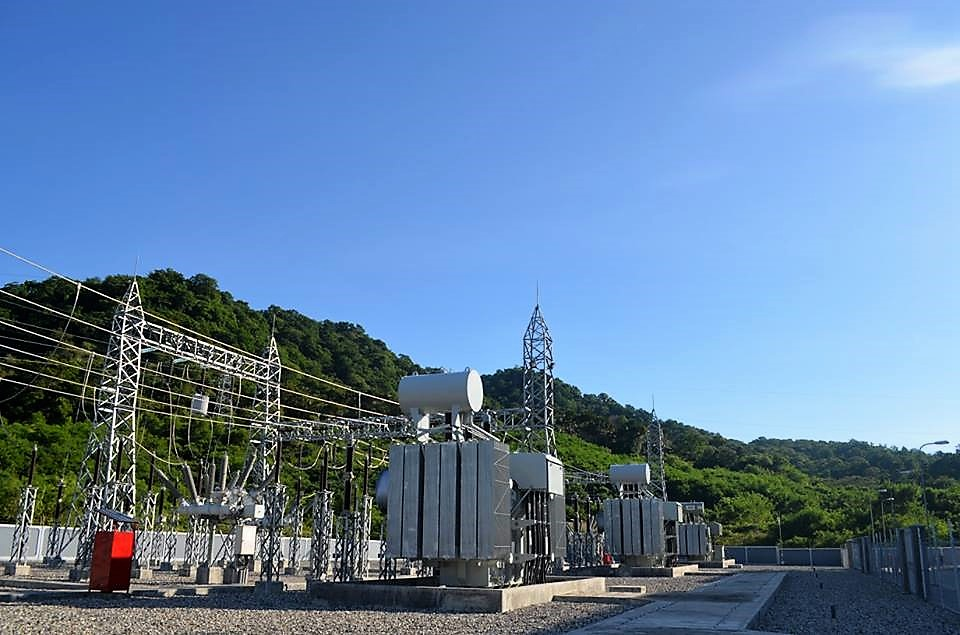
Electrical substation

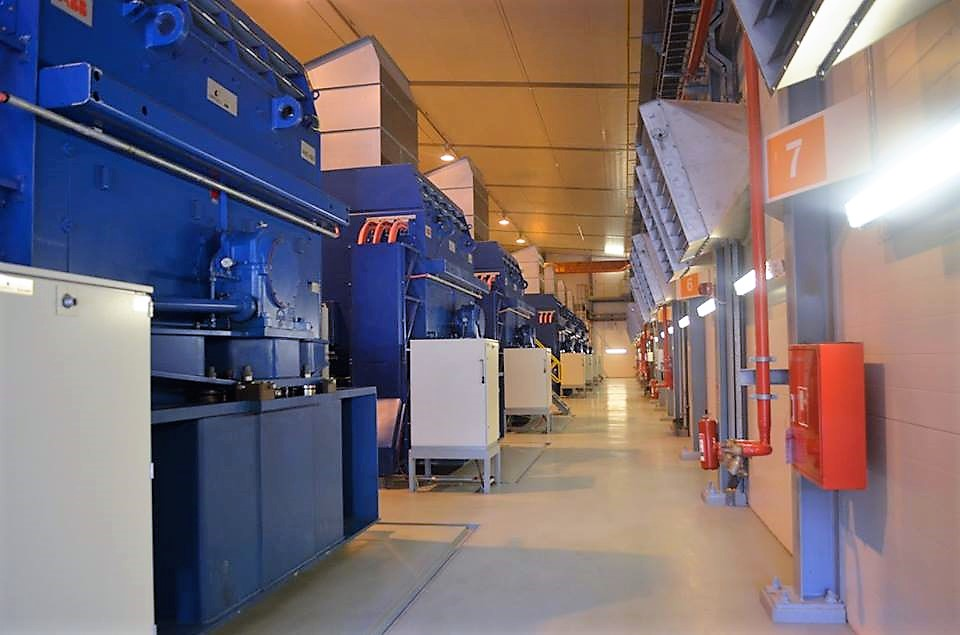
Interior of the power station

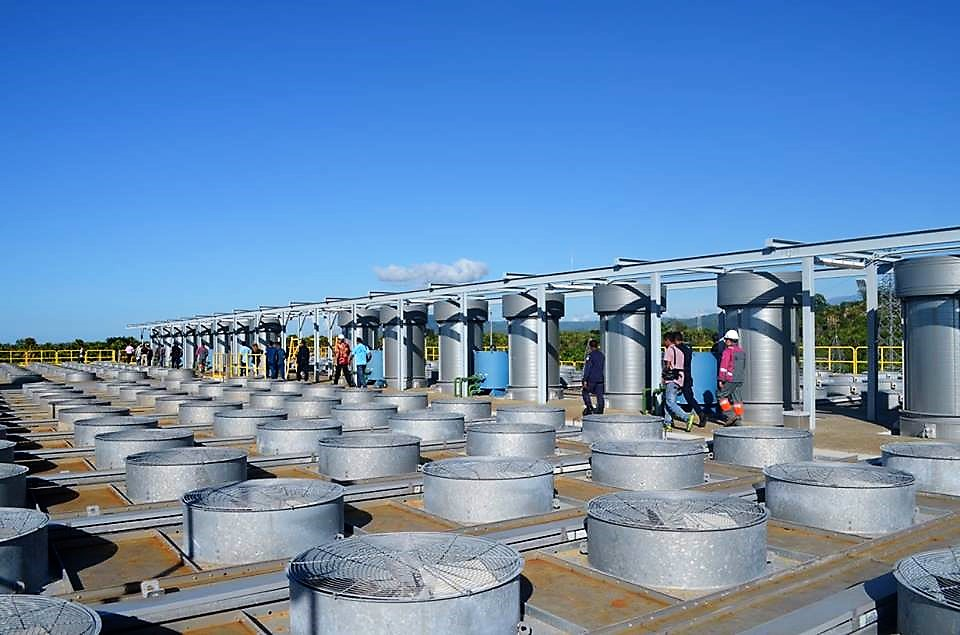
Cooling cells

== See also ==
- List of power stations in Timor-Leste
