= Guyana Power and Light =

Utility company

- Formerly: Guyana Electricity Company
- Type: Public Company
- Industry: Energy
- Headquarters: Georgetown, Guyana, Guyana
- Area served: Coastal Guyana
- Key people: CEO Bharat Dindyal
- Production output: 690 GWh (2012)
- Revenue: G$ 29,028,087 (2012)
- Number of employees: 975
- Website: https://gplinc.com/

Guyana Power and Light (GPL) is a publicly owned utility company in Guyana, providing electric power in the country. Domestic voltage can be 110 or 220 depending on the area, both 50 and 60 cycle power. Services are provided from Charity to Moleson Creek, including the islands of Leguan and Wakenaam in the Essequibo River.

GPL has power stations at Sophia, Georgetown, in Onverwagt (West Berbice) as well as facilities in Bartica, Anna Regina, and Fairfield.

== History ==
Before the turn of the twentieth century, power was provided by private entities, particularly in Georgetown and New Amsterdam, Guyana. Mining areas of Linden and Everton (upper Berbice) received power from Alcan and Reynolds Group Holdings, mainly for their Mackenzie (Linden) and Berbice-based bauxite operations.

The International Power Company of Canada was in operation in Georgetown at the turn of the twentieth century. The Demerara Electric Company was established in 1925 when it purchased the assets of IPC. The British Guiana Electricity Company (BGEC) came into being in 1957, and in 1960 it purchased the assets of the Demerara Electric Company. After Independence in May 1966, the BGEC was nationalized and the Guyana Electricity Company (GEC) was established. By 1991, the facilities had deteriorated and the capacity of 253 megawatts of electricity and generated 647 gigawatt-hours of electricity only satisfied half the estimated demand. Blackouts were common.

Thirty three years later, the Government of Guyana divested 50 percent of its ownership and control to a UK-based consortium comprising the Electricity Supply Board International and the Commonwealth Development Corporation. The divestiture failed and the company once again became wholly owned by the state on 1 May 2003.

The failure of GPL to significantly cut back its technical and commercial losses has been deemed to be largely due to the lack of incentives for efficiency due to its ownership structure. Accordingly, its privatization was expected to generate commercial incentives to improve efficiency, while also enhancing private funding to develop the system. However the privatized venture failed to deliver the results expected and, after a few years returned to Government ownership. A future re-privatization of GPL is unlikely to occur before the regulatory and institutional framework of the sector is improved.

Generator maintenance was contracted out to Wärtsilä until 2018 when the role was handed over to Power Producers and Distribution Inc.
