= Gariuai Hydroelectric Plant =

Hydroelectric power station in Baucau, East Timor

- Country: East Timor
- Location: Gariuai, Baucau District
- Coordinates: 8°34′37.25″S 126°25′34.50″E
- Status: Operational
- Construction began: 2006
- Commission date: November 2008
- Construction cost: US$1.4 million
- Owner: HydroTimor

Power generation
- Units operational: 1 x 326 kW Pelton-type
- Nameplate capacity: 326 kW
- Annual net output: 1,452,000 kWh

The Gariuai Hydroelectric Plant is a run-of-the-river micro hydro power plant located in the town of Gariuai in Baucau District, East Timor. It failed within months of its first startup, due to a landslide which took out the penstock. A subsequent effort to restore the penstock a few years later was inadequate, and the penstock failed yet again. This time due to a lack of welding between the pipes. The dams, transmission lines, power station and much of the penstock remain intact but the site has not been used for power generation since the last failure in 2008. It was the only operational hydroelectric power station in the country, and has operated for just a few months total. In order to reduce dependency on diesel generators, sites were surveyed in 2004 in Baucau District for a hydroelectric power plant. Two streams, Builai and Wainalale were selected to provide water to the power station. Construction began in 2006. A 2 m (6.6 ft) tall embankment dam was constructed on Builai stream and a second 1 m (3.3 ft) high dam was built on Wainalale stream. Connecting the dams to the power station is 2,200 m (7,200 ft) of penstock. A single 326 kW Pelton turbine-generator is located in the power station which was commissioned in November 2008. The elevation between the reservoirs and the power station affords a hydraulic head of 196 m (643 ft). The project cost US$1.4 million which was funded by a grant from the Norwegian Water Resources and Energy Directorate.
