= 2026 in Guyana =

- Decades: 2000s; 2010s; 2020s
- See also: Other events of 2026; Timeline of Guyana history

Events in the year 2026 in Guyana.

== Incumbents ==
- President: Irfaan Ali
- Prime Minister: Mark Phillips

== Events ==
=== January ===
- 5 January – The government suspends the licences of 107 Brazilian miners operating in Guyana for failing to declare or sell extracted gold to the Guyanese government or authorised buyers.
- 26 January – Azruddin Mohamed is elected as Leader of the Opposition in the National Assembly.

=== March ===
- 15 March – Stabroek News ceases publication after having been in operation since 1986.

=== April ===
- 10 April – A Cessna Caravan crashes into a mountainside near the Brazilian border in Imbaimadai, leaving the pilot missing.

=== May ===
- 14 May – The government says one of its soldiers was injured in a shooting during a patrol along the Cuyuni River marking the disputed border with Venezuela earlier in the months.
- 29 May – A Guyana Defence Force patrol boat is fired upon by unidentified gunmen along the Cuyuni River marking the disputed border with Venezuela, injuring a soldier.

=== July ===
- 19 July – At least 73 people are killed when the passenger ferry MV Barima capsizes near Charity.
- 24 July – The United States imposes a 12.5% tariff on Guyana, citing the presence of alleged forced labour in the supply chain.

=== October ===
- 30–31 October – King Charles III makes a state visit to Guyana.

== Holidays ==
- 1 January – New Year's Day
- 23 February – Republic Day
- 3 March – Holi
- 3 April – Good Friday
- 6 April - Easter Monday
- 1 May – Labour Day
- 5 May – Arrival Day
- 26 May – Independence Day
- 27 May – Eid al-Adha
- 6 July – CARICOM Day
- 1 August – Emancipation Day
- 25 August – Youman-Nabi
- 8–9 November – Diwali
- 25 December – Christmas Day
- 26 December – Boxing Day

== Deaths ==
- 23 February – Rupert Roopnaraine, 83, minister of education (2015–2017)
- 10 October – Eusi Kwayana, 101, MP (1953, 1986–1990)

== See also ==
- List of years in Guyana
