= List of years in Guyana =

This is a list of years in Guyana. See also the history of Guyana. For only articles about years in Guyana that have been written, see Category:Years in Guyana.

== 21st century ==
2020s
2020
2021
2022
2023
2024
2025
2026
2027
2028
2029

2010s
2010
2011
2012
2013
2014
2015
2016
2017
2018
2019

2000s
2000
2001
2002
2003
2004
2005
2006
2007
2008
2009
