= 2021 in Guyana =

- Decades: 2000s; 2010s; 2020s
- See also: Other events of 2021; Timeline of Guyana history

Events in the year 2021 in Guyana.

== Incumbents ==
- President: Irfaan Ali
- Prime Minister: Mark Phillips

== Events ==
Ongoing — COVID-19 pandemic in Guyana

- February 3 – Taiwan establishes a trade office in Guyana, much to the chagrin of China.

== Deaths ==
- 17 January – Ebe Gilkes, jazz pianist and bandleader (born 1930 or 1931).
- 2 February – Reggie Ford, boxer (born 1953).
- 26 July – George De Peana, long-distance runner and trade union leader (born 1936).
- 16 August – Bishwaishwar Ramsaroop, politician (born 1939).
- 24 December – Joycelynne Loncke, academic (born 1941).

== See also ==
- List of years in Guyana
