= 2022 in Guyana =

- Decades: 2000s; 2010s; 2020s
- See also: Other events of 2022; Timeline of Guyana history

Events in the year 2022 in Guyana.

== Incumbents ==
- President: Irfaan Ali
- Prime Minister: Mark Phillips

== Events ==
Ongoing — COVID-19 pandemic in Guyana

== Sports ==
- July 29 – August 8: Guyana at the 2022 Commonwealth Games
- August 9 – August 18: Guyana at the 2021 Islamic Solidarity Games

== Deaths ==
- January 11 – Khaleel Mohammed, religious leader (born 1955)
- February 17 – Balram Singh Rai, politician, minister of home affairs (1961–1962) (born 1921)
- May 11 – Ian Hall, musician (born 1940)
- August 31 – Mary Noel Menezes, historian (born 1930)
- September 1 – Rashleigh Jackson, politician, minister for foreign affairs (1978–1990) (born 1929)

== See also ==
- List of years in Guyana
