= 2025 in Guyana =

- Decades: 2000s; 2010s; 2020s
- See also: Other events of 2025; Timeline of Guyana history

Events in the year 2025 in Guyana.

== Incumbents ==
- President: Irfaan Ali
- Prime Minister: Mark Phillips

== Events ==
=== February ===
- 17 February – Six soldiers are injured in an attack by an armed men operating from the Venezuelan side of the border along the Cuyuni River.

=== March ===
- 1 March – President Irfaan Ali accuses the Venezuelan Navy of entering its territorial waters and harassing an offshore unit of ExxonMobil.

=== April ===
- 28 April – Riots break out in Georgetown following the death of an 11-year-old girl, Adrianna Younge, who drowned at a resort. Younge's family claims that she was abducted from the resort and sacrificed as part of a ritual. Police kill two men suspected of looting during the unrest.
- 29 April – A curfew is imposed in Georgetown in response to the previous day's riots.

=== May ===
- 1 May – The International Court of Justice orders Venezuela to stop holding elections for officials to administer areas of Guyana that it claims as part of its territory.
- 10 May – Former General Secretary of the People's National Congress Reform, Amna Ally, dies at the age of 69.
- 15 May – The Guyana Defence Force says its soldiers were attacked on three occasions by armed men in civilian clothing during patrols on the Cuyuni River in territory claimed by Venezuela.

=== September ===
- 1 September – 2025 Guyanese general election: Irfaan Ali is reelected to a second term as president.
- 7 September – Irfaan Ali is inaugurated for a second term as president.

=== October ===
- 26 October – One person is killed in a bomb attack on a gas station in Georgetown.
- 31 October – We Invest in Nationhood leader Azruddin Mohamed is arrested following an extradition request by the United States on multiple criminal charges.

== Holidays ==
- 1 January – New Year's Day
- 23 – 24 February – Republic Day
- 14 March – Holi
- 18 April – Good Friday
- 21 April - Easter Monday
- 1 May – Labour Day
- 5 May – Arrival Day
- 26 May – Independence Day
- 7 June – Eid al-Adha
- 1 July – CARICOM Day
- 5 September – Youman-Nabi
- 1 August – Emancipation Day
- 20 October – Diwali
- 25 December – Christmas Day
- 26 December – Boxing Day

== See also ==
- List of years in Guyana
