= 2024 in Guyana =

- Decades: 2000s; 2010s; 2020s
- See also: Other events of 2024; Timeline of Guyana history

Events in the year 2024 in Guyana.

== Incumbents ==
- President: Irfaan Ali
- Prime Minister: Mark Phillips

== Events ==
=== February ===
- 2 February – The National Assembly approves the Estimates of Revenue and Expenditure for Fiscal Year 2024.
- 6 February – ExxonMobil raises Guyana's oil production to 645,000 bpd; three platforms exceed capacity, and future projects get projected to boost output to over 1.2 million bpd by 2027.

=== March ===
- 21 March – Venezuela approves the creation of the new state Guayana Esequiba in the disputed Esequibo region; Guyana rejects the move.

=== May ===
- 11 May – Flooding in Upper Takutu-Upper Essequibo washes out roads and villages, including the Lethem-Annai trail, and blocks key crossings like Katoonarib and Karasabai.

=== June ===
- 10 June –
  - The World Bank approves a US$45 million project to boost coastal flood resilience in Guyana under the Low Carbon Development Strategy.
- The United States imposes sanctions on two Guyanese businessmen and a senior government official for alleged tax evasion and gold smuggling.

=== July ===
- The National Assembly adopts the Family Violence Act, expanding protections, penalties, and access to civil litigation for victims.
- The People's Progressive Party/Civic passes legislation increasing government influence on the University of Guyana's council.

=== September ===
- 1 September – Authorities announce the seizure of over 3,600 kilograms of cocaine worth $200 million in a jungle in the northwestern part of the country near the border with Venezuela, the largest cocaine seizure in the country's recent history.
- 20 September – Public Works Minister Juan Edghill announces that the completion of the US$260 million Demerara River Bridge is delayed to 31 March 2025.
- U.S.-based activist Melissa Atwell accuses the Guyanese government of harassment after police raid her relatives’ home. The Attorney General files a defamation suit against her.

=== December ===
- 19 December – Venezuelan Ambassador Carlos Amador Pérez Silva meets Guyana’s Foreign Affairs Minister Hugh Todd after being invited to discuss the construction of a bridge linking Venezuela’s mainland to a military base on Ankoko Island.
- 20 December – The Ministry of Foreign Affairs issues a formal protest to Venezuela over the completed bridge to Ankoko Island, stating that the military base is partly on Guyanese territory.

== Holidays ==
- 1 January – New Year's Day
- 23 February – Republic Day
- 25 March – Holi
- 29 March – Good Friday
- 1 April - Easter Monday
- 1 May – Labour Day
- 5 May – Arrival Day
- 26 May – Independence Day
- 17 June – Eid al-Adha
- 1 July – CARICOM Day
- 16 September – Youman-Nabi
- 1 August – Emancipation Day
- 31 October – Diwali
- 25 December – Christmas Day
- 26 December – Boxing Day

== See also ==
- List of years in Guyana
