= 2019 in Guyana =

- Decades: 1990s; 2000s; 2010s; 2020s
- See also: Other events of 2019; Timeline of Guyana history

Events in the year 2019 in Guyana.

== Incumbents ==
- President: David Granger
- Prime Minister: Moses Nagamootoo

== Events ==
- December 20 – Production of crude oil starts from the Liza oil field in the Stabroek Block offshore Guyana.
- Scheduled – The 2019 Guyanese general election was postponed and held on 2 March 2020.

== Deaths ==
- 5 January – Odeen Ishmael, diplomat (b. 1948).
- 31 May – Andaiye, political activist (b. 1942).
