= 2020 in Guyana =

- Decades: 2000s; 2010s; 2020s
- See also: Other events of 2020; Timeline of Guyana history

Events in the year 2020 in Guyana.

== Incumbents ==
- President: David Granger (until 2 August), Irfaan Ali (starting 2 August)
- Prime Minister: Moses Nagamootoo (until 2 August), Mark Phillips (starting 2 August)

== Events ==
- 11 March – The first case of COVID-19 in the country is reported: a 52-year-old woman suffering from underlying health conditions, including diabetes and hypertension. The woman died at the Georgetown Public Hospital, making her the first COVID-19 death in the country as well.
- 18 March – All schools in the country were closed.
- 19 March – The Guyana Civil Aviation Authority (GCAA) closed Guyanese airspace to all international arrivals.
- 2 August – Irfaan Ali succeeds David Granger as the 10th President of Guyana.
- 12 September – Guyana–Venezuela territorial dispute: Juan Edghill, Minister of Public Affairs, expresses confidence that the International Court of Justice (ICJ) will rule in Guyana's favor in the border dispute with Venezuela.

== Deaths ==
- 7 April – John Percy Leon Lewis, 77, military officer; COVID-19
- 25 August – Sase Narain, politician, former Speaker of the National Assembly (b. 1925).

== See also ==
- 2020 in the Caribbean
