= 2016 in Guyana =

- Decades: 1990s; 2000s; 2010s; 2020s
- See also: Other events of 2016; Timeline of Guyana history

Events in the year 2016 in Guyana

== Incumbents ==
- President: David Granger
- Prime Minister: Moses Nagamootoo
