= 2023 in Guyana =

- Decades: 2000s; 2010s; 2020s
- See also: Other events of 2023; Timeline of Guyana history

Events in the year 2023 in Guyana.

== Incumbents ==
- President: Irfaan Ali
- Prime Minister: Mark Phillips

== Events ==
Ongoing — COVID-19 pandemic in Guyana

- 6 April – The International Court of Justice rules that the case of territorial dispute between Venezuela and Guyana over Guayana Esequiba can proceed. Guyanese President Irfaan Ali welcomes the decision and commits Guyana to solve the dispute peacefully. Venezuela had earlier rejected the ruling, alleging that the case cannot be heard without the involvement of the United Kingdom, Guyana's former colonial power.
- 22 May – 2023 Mahdia school fire: At least 20 children are killed during a fire at a school in Mahdia.
- 15 November – Venezuela announces that it will proceed with a referendum on the status of Guayana Esequiba, despite Guyana's petition to stop the referendum from being held.
- 26 November – Guyanese President Irfaan Ali visits the region of Guayana Esequiba and hoists the Guyanese flag, amid heightening tensions with Venezuela over the territory. Venezuela calls the action a "provocation".
- 6 December – GDF Bell 412 Helicopter crash – A Guyana Defence Force helicopter goes missing while on a border operation near the border with Venezuela.
- 7 December – The Guyanese government confirms that five military officers who were in a Bell 412EP helicopter that crashed near the border with Venezuela have died and that two others survived the crash. The helicopter went missing on Wednesday during bad weather conditions. It is the deadliest incident in Guyanese military history.
- 8 December – Amid growing border tensions between Guyana and Venezuela, the U.S. embassy in Guyana announces that the United States Southern Command will conduct joint flight operations with the Guyana Defence Force.
- 9 December – 2023 Guayana Esequiba crisis: The United Nations Security Council holds a closed-door meeting on the ongoing crisis between Venezuela and Guyana over the Guayana Esequiba Region, but takes no immediate action.
- 12 December – 2023 Guayana Esequiba crisis: A meeting is to be held in Saint Vincent and the Grenadines on Thursday to discuss the ongoing dispute between Venezuela and Guyana. Both countries will try to prevent the crisis escalating into an armed conflict.
- 14 December – Venezuelan President Nicolás Maduro and Guyanese President Irfaan Ali hold talks in Kingstown, Saint Vincent and the Grenadines. Both leaders agree to neither use threats nor force against the other. A joint commission is announced to address the existing issues, with a report expected within three months.
- 24 December – The United Kingdom announces that it will deploy the patrol vessel HMS Trent off the coast of Guyana amid Guyana's dispute with Venezuela over the Essequibo region.

== Deaths ==
- 29 January – Gordon Rohlehr, literary scholar and critic (born 1942).

== See also ==
- List of years in Guyana
