= 2018 in Guyana =

- Decades: 1990s; 2000s; 2010s; 2020s
- See also: Other events of 2018; Timeline of Guyana history

Events in the year 2018 in Guyana.

== Incumbents ==
- President: David Granger
- Prime Minister: Moses Nagamootoo

== Events ==
- 9 November – An aircraft accident shortly after departure from Cheddi Jagan International Airport

== Deaths ==
- 17 February – Mohamed Shahabuddeen, judge and politician (b. 1931).
- 8 March – Wilson Harris, writer (b. 1921).
- 28 June – Abdul Kadir, politician and convicted terrorist (born c.1952)
