= 2017 in Guyana =

- Decades: 1990s; 2000s; 2010s; 2020s
- See also: Other events of 2017; Timeline of Guyana history

Events in the year 2017 in Guyana.

== Incumbents ==
- President: David Granger
- Prime Minister: Moses Nagamootoo

== Events ==
=== Sports ===
- 14 to 30 July – Guyana participated at the 2017 World Aquatics Championships with 3 competitors.
- 4 to 13 August – Guyana participated at the 2017 World Championships in Athletics with 2 competitors (1 man and 1 woman) in 3 events.
- 16 to 21 October – Georgetown hosted the 2017 Indoor Pan American Cup, (an indoor hockey tournament). The women's tournament was won by the United States, while Trinidad and Tobago won the men's tournament.

== Deaths ==
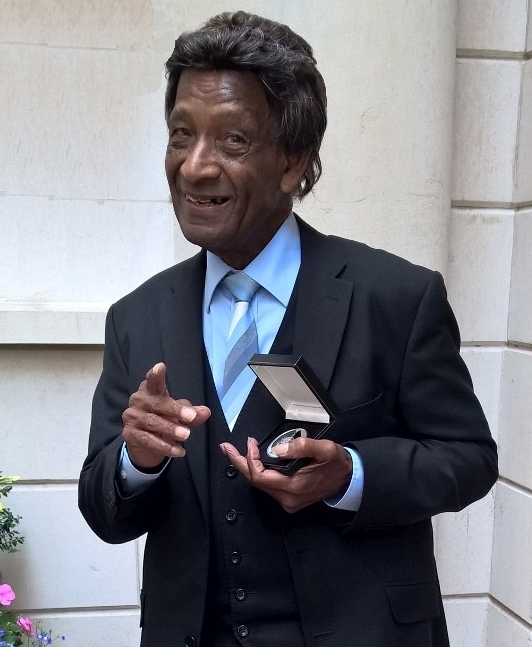
Frank Holder

- 5 July – John Rodriguez, Guyanese-born Canadian politician (b. 1937).
- 29 October – Frank Holder, jazz singer and percussionist (b. 1925).
