= Mignon Bowen-Phillips =

Guyanese public servant

- Born: Mignon Bowen; Georgetown, British Guiana (present-day Guyana)
- Spouse: Mark Phillips

Mignon Bowen-Phillips is a retired regional public servant who was employed at the CARICOM Secretariat for over 32 years. As a member of the CARICOM Electoral Observer Mission, Phillips observed several general elections across the Caribbean region. She was also an instrumental figure in raising awareness for breast cancer and cervical cancer in Guyana. Bowen-Phillips is married to Brigadier Mark Phillips, a Guyanese politician and retired military officer who is the 9th Prime Minister of Guyana.

== Early life and education ==
Bowen-Phillips grew up in North East La Penitence, Georgetown, Guyana. She is the daughter of George Leland Bowen, a tailor and cutter, and Esme Glendora Bowen, a housewife. She attended the East La Penitence Primary School and the South Georgetown Secondary School. Her first job was at the National Insurance Scheme (NIS) in Guyana. She also worked at the Bank of Guyana in the Exchange Control Department.

Prior to her retirement in 2021, Bowen-Phillips was employed at the CARICOM Secretariat for over 32 years. During her time at the CARICOM Secretariat, she earned a Master of Business Administration (MBA) and a Bachelor of Public Administration from the University of Guyana and many other qualifications and certificates.

An advocate for good governance and upholding the rule of law, Bowen-Phillips observed several general elections across the Caribbean region as a member of the CARICOM Electoral Observer Mission. She also served as President of the Staff Association at the CARICOM Secretariat.

== Cancer awareness in Guyana ==
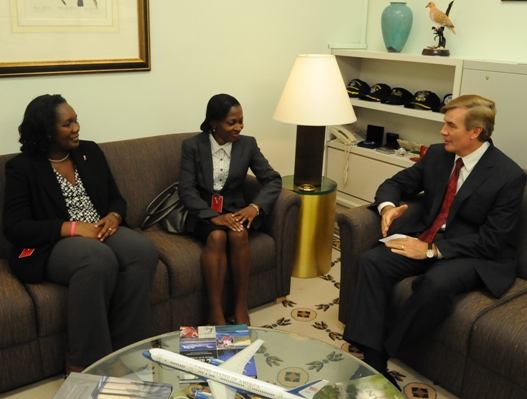
Bowen-Phillips (left) meets U.S. Ambassador Hardt (2011)

As Chairperson of the Avon Community Help Fund (ACHF) Breast Cancer Committee, Bowen-Phillips was instrumental raising awareness for breast cancer in Guyana. She managed the yearly work plan of the ACHF as well as Breast Cancer Awareness month activities, and was the primary breast cancer awareness advocate liaising with the Ministry of Health in Guyana. She was also instrumental in raising awareness for breast cancer and cervical cancer in Guyana through the Periwinkle Club.

== Personal life ==
Bowen-Phillips is married to the 9th Prime Minister of Guyana Brigadier Mark Phillips.
