= Ruimveldt Riots (1905) =

The Ruimveldt Riots took place in British Guiana (today Guyana) in 1905. It reflected the widespread dissatisfaction among workers with their standards of living. The uprising began in late November 1905 when the stevedores – dockworkers – of the capital Georgetown went on strike and demanded higher wages. The strike grew, with many workers joining in an alliance. On 1 December 1905 – today known as "Black Friday" – the situation came to a head. At the Plantation Ruimveldt, not far from Georgetown, a large crowd of porters refused a demand by the police and a detachment of artillery to disperse. The colonial forces opened fire, and four workers were seriously injured.

News spread quickly through the capital, causing unrest on the streets. Several buildings were captured by protesters. The violence killed seven people, and injured seventeen badly. After a request from the colonial administration Britain sent troops, who soon quelled the uprising. Although the initial strike wasn't successful, the riots began the growth of an organized trade union movement.

Ethnically, mainly Afro-Guyanese workers – dockworkers, factory hands, cane-cutters and gold miners, among others – went on strike, while the Indo-Guyanese sugar industry workers stayed in their homes. Some were also brought in to replace African-origin workers who had left their work. This has been described as a successful use of ethnic divisions to prevent solidarity between segments of the working class.

== See also ==
- History of Guyana
