= Atlantic Coast =

Atlantic Coast may refer to:

- Any coast facing the Atlantic Ocean

== Regions ==
- Atlantic Coast (Argentina)
- East Coast of the United States
- Gulf Coast of the United States
- Caribbean region of Colombia
- Atlantic Canada

== Sports ==
- Atlantic Coast Conference, a collegiate athletic conference on the Atlantic Coast of the United States
- Atlantic Coast League, a high school athletic conference in Massachusetts

== Transport ==
- Atlantic Coast Airlines, an airline in the United States
- Atlantic Coast Express, a former express passenger train in England

== See also ==
- Atlantic Coast Line (disambiguation)
- Atlantic Coast restingas, Brazil
- Atlantic Coastal Plain, USA
