= Ebe Gilkes Quartet =

Guyanese band

The Ebe Gilkes Quartet was a Guyanese band that became very popular on Barbados in the 1950s, led by Trinidadian jazz pianist Edwin "Ebe" Gilkes.

Other members:

- James Gilkes
- Jesus Gilkes
- Gilkes Gilkes
- Arturo Tappin

== History ==
In the 1950s, low wages for jazz musicians led to many Barbadians immigrating abroad to Canada, US, or the UK. Additionally, travel between British Commonwealth countries encouraged movement between countries of the Caribbean, so clubs and hotels in Barbados were bringing in acts from neighboring countries such as Guyana. Gilkes was a part of the Billy Green Quartet that played in the Coconut Creek Nightclub in Barbados, and by the end of the decade he was the only one to remain in Barbados.

By the 1960s, he played at the Bel Air Nightclub in Bridgetown, a venue that was a part of the middle-class nightlife, playing contemporary jazz and bossa nova. Through the 1960s and 1970s, support for jazz was mainly by foreign tourists, and he played in venues such as the Blue Water Beach Hotel and freelanced in other hotels, playing music for dance and floorshows.

Arturo Tappin, a Barbadian saxophonist who was a sideman in the Ebe Gilkes' Band in the early 1980s, went to the US to study jazz formally, and contributed to the jazz scene in Barbados taking a major role in the formation of the International Barbados/Caribbean Jazz Festival. Gilkes played with Bim in the late 1980s as well as other festivals.

In 1989, the After Dark Club was opened and featured nightly performances by the Ebe Gilkes Trio. Their style was considered "modern instrumental".

== Legacy ==
Ebe Gilkes was honored in 2012 at the Naniki Caribbean Jazz Safari by two Barbadian chief justices; David Simmons and Marston Gibson.
