= Atlantic Coast Line =

Atlantic Coast Line may refer to:

- Atlantic Coast Line Railroad, in the United States
- Atlantic Coast Line (Cornwall), a railway line in England
