= 1978 Guyanese constitutional referendum =

- 10 July 1978
- Do you approve of the Constitutional (Amendment) Bill No. 8 of 1978 and published in the Official Gazette of May 13th, 1978?

Results
Choice	Votes	%
Yes	419,936	97.91%
No	8,956	2.09%
Valid votes	428,892	99.48%
Invalid or blank votes	2,228	0.52%
Total votes	431,120	100.00%
Registered voters/turnout	609,225	70.77%

A constitutional referendum was held in Guyana on 10 July 1978. The proposed change to Article 73 of the constitution would abolish the need for referendums to change the entrenched provisions of the constitution (including presidential powers, the dissolution of Parliament and the electoral system) and instead allow them to be changed by a two-thirds majority in parliament (which the ruling People's National Congress had at the time). It would also result in the postponement of the elections scheduled for later in the year, and instead the parliament elected in 1973 would be declared a Constituent Assembly.

The bill was passed by parliament on 10 April, with the referendum to be held three months later. The changes were reportedly approved by 97% of voters with a turnout of 70%, although the figures were subject to fraud by the government. The opposition claimed that turnout was only between 10% and 14%.

Following the referendum, the parliamentary term was prolonged and a new socialist constitution was written and promulgated in 1980.

== Results ==
Choice	Votes	%
For	419,936	97.09
Against	8,956	2.91
Invalid/blank votes	2,228	–
Total	431,120	100
Registered voters/turnout	609,225	70.77
Source: Direct Democracy
