= Mashramani =

Annual festival in Guyana

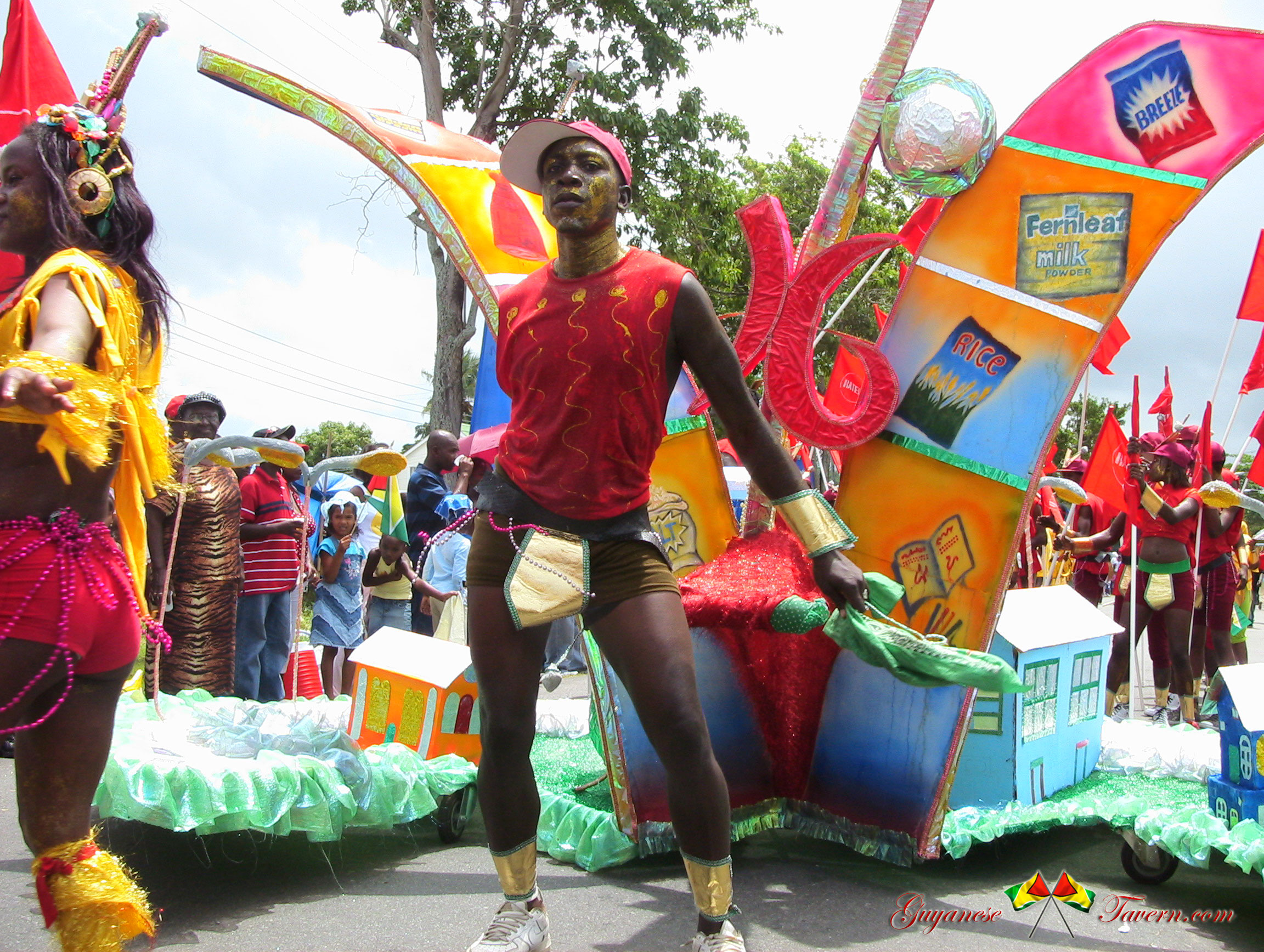
Mash in Guyana 2007

Mashramani, often abbreviated to "Mash", is an annual festival that celebrates Guyana becoming a Republic in 1970.

The festival, usually held on 23 February – Guyana Republic Day – includes a parade, music, games and cooking and is intended to commemorate the "Birth of the Republic". In 2016, the Mashramani parade was held on 26 May, the 50th anniversary of Guyana's independence, but the remainder of the celebration was held on the traditional February date.

The word "Mashramani" is derived from an Amerindian word and in Guyanese English means "celebration after cooperative or hard work". It is one of the most colourful of all the country's festivals, and one of the few that involves all Guyanese ethnic groups. There are spectacular costume competitions, float parades, masquerade bands, and dancing in the streets to the accompaniment of steel band music and calypsos. Masquerades frequent the streets performing acrobatic dance routines, a vivid reminder of Guyana's African heritage. Calypso, soca, chutney-soca, and chutney music competitions are another integral part of Mashramani, and this culminates in the coronation of a King or Queen for the particular year.

== Origin ==
The Jaycees of Linden had, since Guyana became independent in 1966, been organizing an Independence Carnival in Mackenzie. When Guyana became a Republic in February 23, 1970, they formed a Jaycees Republic Celebrations Committee. Basil Butcher was selected as Chairman but due to his being selected to tour Australia with the West Indies Cricket Team, Jim Blackman was appointed as the Deputy to carry on. A broad based committee including resource personnel such as Wordsworth McAndrew, Arthur Seymour, and Adrian Thompson, began the organization of the Carnival activities.

The search for a name to replace Carnival began and it was suggested by Basil Butcher that an Amerindian name be chosen. This was agreed to and several individuals including Mr. Allan Fiedtkou, an Amerindian, were contacted. Mr. Fiedtkou held discussions with his grandfather who explained a type of Festival that was held by Amerindians whenever they gather to celebrate a special event. This event he said was like "Muster Many" (or Mashirimehi in Amerindian) and sounded in Lokono like Mashramani. Steps were taken to confirm this. Adrian Thomson concluded that since no one could have confirmed or denied that the Lokono word for Festival was Mashramani, then the Festival could be called Mashramani. On 23 February 1970 the Festival called "Mashramani" was a huge success with people drawn from all Regions of Guyana to Linden welcoming Guyana's status as a republic with over three days of frolic and fun. The mashramani first One thousand strong Costume revolver is known as Ms.Una Garner, which ever region in guyana that her costume was taken to participate in mashramani celebration she defeated an uphold her crown.

After witnessing the massive crowds, glitter and level of competition, Mr. David Singh, a Government Official, held discussion with the Jaycees Committee about bringing the event to Georgetown, the nation's capital. Approval was also given by the then President Forbes Burnham for Mash to be a National Event for the Republic celebration. Mash activities were rotated in Linden, Berbice and Georgetown but due to sponsorship, the Costume Bands contest remained in Georgetown.

== Celebration ==
With Guyana being as large as it is, people travel from miles out of town to be a part of the celebrations, with children, food and all, because they see this day as a day of celebration. The Mash Day depicts a hive of activity from Vlissingen and Irving streets all the way to the National Park, with an air of expectancy. Thousands of people summon to the streets to participate in the annual Mashramani celebrations, which has been a part of Guyanese culture for over 50 years.

== Carnival (Mashramani) dates ==
The table shows a list of Guyana Carnival (Mash) dates, 2013 to 2019.

Calendar Year	Dates
2013	Sat 23 February
2014	Sun 23 February
2015	Mon 23 February
2016	Thu 26 May
2017	Thu 23 February
2018	Fri 23 February
2019	Sat 23 February

== See also ==
- Culture of Guyana
