= Petroleum industry in Guyana =

The petroleum industry in Guyana is rapidly expanding. The country has emerged as one of the newest petroleum-producing nations in the world, achieving its first commercial grade crude oil draw in December 2019. Crude oil is sent abroad for refining.

Since the onset of production, Guyana has experienced a rapid increase in oil output, with production levels reaching approximately 660,000 barrels per day by 2024. With plans to further increase production to about 1.3 million barrels per day by 2027, Guyana is set to significantly expand its influence in the global oil market, presenting new economic opportunities and challenges for the country.

In 2022, a Guyanese petroleum training facility was launched, with investments in staff training amounting to US $20 million. The training centre is located in Lusignan, Demerara-Mahaica. In December 2024, Guyana became the world's third largest petroleum-producing country per capita.

The discovery of oil has also reignited the border dispute with Venezuela which claims most of Guyana's territory (Essequibo region), leading to a crisis in 2023.

== Early explorations ==
Historically, Guyana was a net importer of fuel. The offshore Guyana Basin and the inland Takatu Basin have attracted foreign companies, including Shell, Total and Mobil, which completed much geological surveyance of the area and drilled a number of wells. In the Takatu Basin, three wells were drilled between 1981 and 1993. However, they were dry or not found to be commercially viable.

Offshore oil exploration began in the 1950s, and nine wells were drilled between 1965 and 1970, only one of which struck oil, the Abary-1 well in the Kanuku license area off the northeastern coast of Guyana. In the late 1980s, Mobil, Total, Guyana Exploration and BHP continued exploration in the region.

In the mid-2000s, CGX Energy attempted to spud a well but the rig was deterred by Surinamese gunboats claiming they were in Surinamese waters. The United Nations International Tribunal for the Law of the Sea (ITLOS) determined the exact borders in September 2007 but no further wells were drilled until 2012.

== Discoveries by ExxonMobil ==
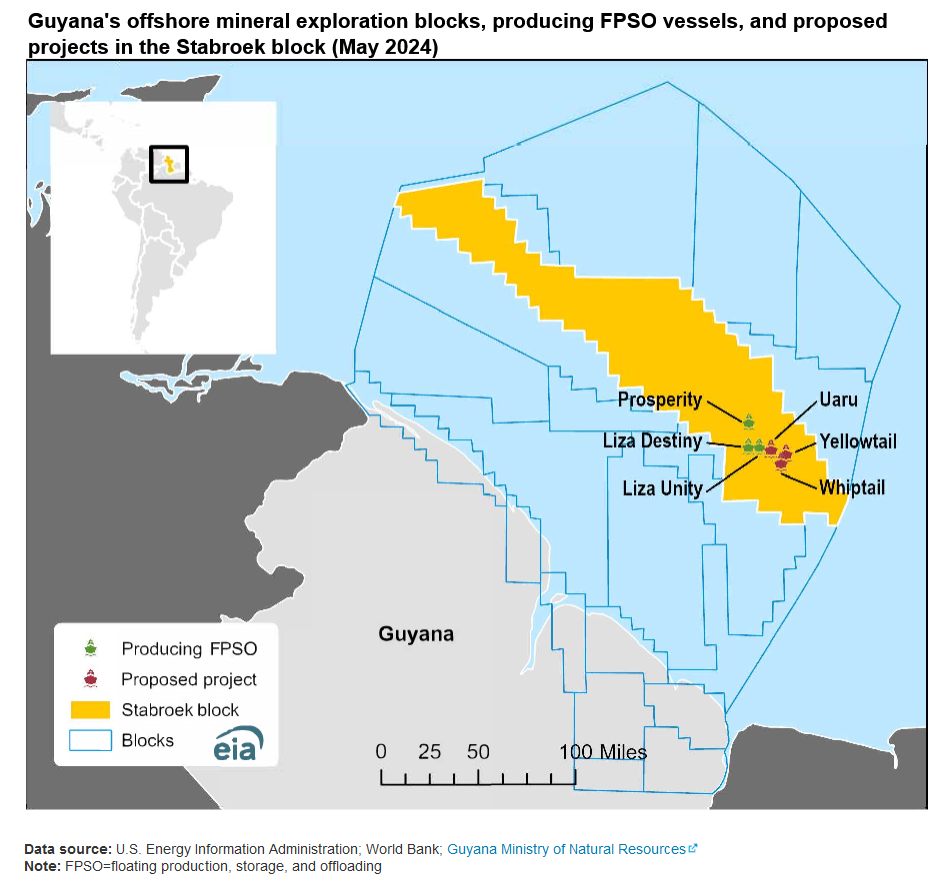
Operating and proposed projects in the Stabroek Block

Esso, a subsidiary of ExxonMobil, began exploring the offshore region in 2008.

In May 2015, ExxonMobil announced the discovery of more than 90 metres of high-quality, oil-bearing sandstone reservoirs about 200 kilometres off the coastline, considered to be one of the largest crude oil discoveries of the past decade. The Liza-1 well was drilled to 5,433 metres in 1,742 metres of water and was the first well on the Stabroek Block, which is 26,800 square kilometres or 6.6 million acres in size. Early estimates claimed the area contained 700 million barrels of oil (a total value of US $40 billion, using international crude prices at the time of discovery).

The Liza Phase 1 project in the Stabroek Block began producing petroleum on 20 December 2019. Two more projects started production in February 2022 and November 2023.

Operated by ExxonMobil Guyana Limited (45%), with Chevron Corporation (30%) and CNOOC (25%) as partners, the block holds an estimated 11.6 billion barrels of oil. As of 2024, crude from the Stabroek Block remains the top-selling oil in Hess Corporation’s global portfolio, averaging US $80.04 per barrel and surpassing the company's production in the United States and Malaysia.

As of 2020, Guyana has nine petroleum blocks under active leases, of which six have had active exploration. The Petroleum Division of the Guyana Geology and Mines Commission has the responsibility of monitoring exploration in Guyana.

As of March 2024, more than 30 discoveries of offshore oil and gas have been made in Guyana. As of May 2024, ExxonMobil estimated its discoveries totaled 11 billion barrels of oil equivalent.

== Issues ==
The economic impact of this significant oil discovery has been the subject of significant debate in Guyana, including during the 2020 general election. Some observers, including Transparency International, have evoked the possibility of oil production creating a resource curse in Guyana as has happened in similar resource-rich countries.

There are also concerns regarding large international companies getting an unfair share of oil royalties. Natural-resources watchdog group Global Witness reported that Guyana may have lost as much as $55 billion in potential revenue from negotiations that favored Exxon. Exxon refuted the claim based on unaccounted-for costs of the high risk involved in exploring the "frontier hydrocarbon province". Global Witness withdrew its report in January 2021, redirecting its efforts to focus on fighting climate change.

In 2022, Guyana announced new model petroleum contracts to increase its share of revenue from oil production. The new contracts add a corporate tax and increase the royalty rate to 10%. However, the new terms do not apply to ExxonMobil's Stabroek Block, where all current crude oil production occurs and for which ExxonMobil pays a royalty rate of 2%.

=== Border dispute with Venezuela ===
The oil and gas discoveries in Guyana since 2015 have increased tensions with neighboring Venezuela. Officials in Caracas, which has long had claims on Guyana's Essequibo region, have alleged that the concession is located in disputed waters. This isn't the first offshore border dispute; in 1968, then-Guyanese Prime Minister Forbes Burnham addressed the United Nations over Venezuelan claims of an area up to 12 miles from the disputed territories. Prior to this, a border award was agreed upon in 1899 as the result of a case overseen by U.S. Chief Justice Melville Fuller. However, in 1954 a memorandum by one of the lawyers was published posthumously, alleging that the award unfairly benefited British Guiana.

In March 2025, a Venezuelan patrol ship entered Guyanese waters and made radio contact with ExxonMobil floating production storage and offloading (FPSO) vessels in the Stabroek Block, warning that they were "operating in the exclusive economic zone of Venezuela". Guyanese President Irfaan Ali said: "This incursion is a matter of grave concern. Guyana’s maritime boundaries are recognized under international law. This is a serious development concerning our nation’s maritime territory. We will not tolerate threats to territorial integrity." Ali also indicated that he had triggered a military response, including the deployment of air assets and Guyana's coast guard. In response, the Venezuelan government accused Ali of "telling bald-faced lies" and claimed that the waters that their ship entered were not part of Guyanese territory but a maritime zone pending delimitation in accordance with international law. The Organization of American States (OAS) released a statement condemning Venezuela's action, saying: "Such acts of intimidation constitute a clear violation of international law, undermine regional stability, and threaten the principles of peaceful coexistence between nations".

== Regulation ==
The Petroleum (Exploration and Production) Act 1986 (PEPA) detailed the State's main regulatory power in granting licenses for petroleum prospecting and production. It was repealed and replaced by the Petroleum Activities Act 2023, in an effort by government to modernize the management of the petroleum sector. The new legislation increases the natural resources minister's powers over future oil projects.

The Natural Resource Fund Act 2019 established a fund for government proceeds from petroleum operations, to be operated by the Bank of Guyana. A different administration overhauled the legislation with the Natural Resource Fund Act 2021, arguing that it was necessary to ensure transparency and accountability.

The Local Content Act 2021 was also passed to require contractors to procure goods and services from Guyanese companies and nationals. ExxonMobil and its partners increased spending on Guyanese suppliers by an annual average of 80% in the 2017-2023 period.
