= Moses Nagamootoo =

Guyanese politician, writer and novelist

The Honourable Moses Veerasammy Nagamootoo MP
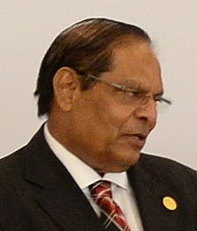

8th Prime Minister and First Vice President of Guyana
- In office 20 May 2015 – 2 August 2020
- President: David A. Granger
- Preceded by: Sam Hinds
- Succeeded by: Mark Phillips

Personal details
- Born: 30 November 1947 (age 78) Whim, Berbice, British Guiana (present-day East Berbice-Corentyne, Guyana)
- Party: Alliance for Change (2011-present)
- Other political affiliations: A Partnership for National Unity (2011-present); People's Progressive Party (1964-2011)
- Spouse: Sita Nagamootoo

The Hon. Moses Veerasammy Nagamootoo MP (born 30 November 1947) is a Guyanese politician, writer and novelist who served as the Prime Minister of Guyana under former President David A. Granger from May 2015 to August 2020.

== Life and career ==
Nagamootoo was born in the village of Whim, Berbice, British Guiana, in the present-day region of East Berbice-Corentyne, in present-day Guyana. He is of Tamil Indian descent. Nagamootoo worked as a teacher and journalist, and later became a lawyer.

After high school, he co-founded the De Edwards/Rosignal High School in the late 1960s. There he taught mainly economics and British Constitution with great passion and enthusiasm, which were new subjects to the aspiring students in the West Coast Berbice, Guyana area. One of his students went on to major as a PhD in economics and now teaches that subject at the University of California, Berkeley Extension, California, US.

He was elected to Parliament in 1992 as a People's Progressive Party MP and subsequently served as Minister of Information and Minister of Local Government. He remained in Cabinet under the presidencies of Cheddi Jagan, Samuel Hinds, Janet Jagan and Bharrat Jagdeo. He resigned as Minister in 2000 but remained an MP until 2011, when he resigned from the PPP, having first joined in 1964.

As a leader of the PPP, Nagamootoo received the fifth-highest number of votes (595) in the election to the PPP Central Committee at its 29th Congress on August 2, 2008.

Nagamootoo was rumoured to be a potential PPP candidate for president in 2011; however, he resigned from the party on October 24, 2011, citing the need for "more ideas and a new conversation about Guyana's economic and foreign policy future". He joined the opposition Alliance For Change (AFC) in October 2011 and was re-elected to Parliament.

Following the opposition's victory in the May 2015 general election, Nagamootoo was sworn in as prime minister and first vice-president on 20 May 2015. Nagamootoo briefly took charge of presidential duties on 12 June 2015 while President David A. Granger was visiting the United States.

=== As a writer ===
Moses Nagamootoo wrote the novel Hendree's Cure, published in 2001.

Political offices
| Preceded by Sam Hinds | Prime Minister of Guyana; 2015–2020 | Succeeded by Mark Phillips |
