= History of Guyana =

The history of Guyana begins about 35,000 years ago with the arrival of humans coming from Eurasia. These migrants became the Kalina and Lokono tribes, who met Alonso de Ojeda's first expedition from Spain in 1499 at the Essequibo River. In the ensuing colonial era, Guyana's government was defined by the successive policies of the French, Dutch, and British settlers.

During the colonial period, Guyana's economy was focused on plantation agriculture, which initially depended on slave labour. Guyana saw major slave rebellions in 1763 and 1823. Following the British Slavery Abolition Act 1833, 800,000 enslaved Africans in the Caribbean and South Africa were freed, resulting in plantations contracting indentured workers, mainly from India. Eventually, these Indians joined forces with Afro-Guyanese to demand equal rights in government and society. After the Second World War, the British Empire pursued policy decolonisation of its overseas territories, with independence granted to British Guiana on 26 May 1966. Following independence, Forbes Burnham rose to power, quickly becoming an authoritarian leader, pledging to bring socialism to Guyana. His power began to weaken following international attention brought to Guyana in wake of the Jonestown mass murder suicide in 1978.

After his unexpected death in 1985, power was peacefully transferred to Desmond Hoyte, who implemented some democratic reforms, before being voted out in 1992. The People's Progressive Party (PPP/C) served as the country's ruling party from 1992 to 2015. It was unseated following the victory of David Granger's Afro-Guyanese political coalition of A Partnership for National Unity and Alliance for Change (APNU+AFC) in 2015. In 2020, the PPP/C returned as the ruling party of Guyana in a contested election.

== Pre-colonial Guyana and first contacts ==
The first people to reach Guyana made their way from Siberia, perhaps as far back as 20,000 years ago. These first inhabitants were nomads who slowly migrated south into Central and South America. At the time of Christopher Columbus's voyages, Guyana's inhabitants were divided into two groups, the Lokono along the coast and the Kalina in the interior. One of the legacies of the indigenous peoples was the word Guiana, often used to describe the region encompassing modern Guyana as well as Suriname (former Dutch Guiana) and French Guiana. The word, which means "land of waters", is appropriate considering the area's multitude of rivers and streams.

Historians speculate that the Lokono and Kalinago originated in the South American hinterland and migrated northward, first to the present-day Guianas and then to the Caribbean islands. The Lokono, mainly cultivators, hunters, and fishermen, migrated to the Caribbean islands before the Kalinago and settled throughout the region. The tranquility of the earlier Arawakan-speaking society was disrupted by the arrival of the bellicose Kalinago from the South American interior. The warlike behaviour of the Kalinago and their violent migration north made an impact. By the end of the 15th century, the Kalinago had displaced the earlier Arawakan-speaking population throughout the islands of the Lesser Antilles. The Kalinago settlement of the Lesser Antilles also affected Guyana's future development. The Spanish explorers and settlers who came after Columbus found that the Arawakan-speaking peoples proved easier to conquer than the Kalinago, who fought hard to maintain their independence. This fierce resistance, along with a lack of gold in the Lesser Antilles, contributed to the Spanish emphasis on conquest and settlement of the Greater Antilles and the mainland. Only a weak Spanish effort was made at consolidating Spain's authority in the Lesser Antilles (with the arguable exception of Trinidad) and the Guianas. In later decades, slaving, land seizure, and disease would destroy such societies, causing those who survived to have a "far less elaborate way of life". Between 1400 and 1860, European slave traders would import 500,000 slaves to Guyana and Suriname, along with sugar, as part of the transatlantic slave trade.

== Colonial Guyana ==
A map created circa 1649 depicting the Guiana region. Territory claimed by Spain in red to the west, Dutch Guiana highlighted in yellow and Portuguese territory in red to the southeast. The mythical Lake Parime is also visible.

=== Early colonisation ===
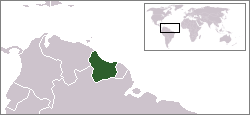
A map of Dutch Guiana 1667–1814.

The Dutch were the first Europeans to settle modern-day Guyana. The Netherlands had obtained independence from Spain in the late 16th century and by the early 17th century had emerged as a major commercial power, trading with the fledgling English and French colonies in the Lesser Antilles. In 1616 the Dutch established the first European settlement in the area of Guyana, a trading post twenty-five kilometres upstream from the mouth of the Essequibo River. Other settlements followed, usually a few kilometres inland on the larger rivers. The initial purpose of the Dutch settlements was trade with the Indigenous people. The Dutch aim soon changed to the acquisition of territory as other European powers gained colonies elsewhere in the Caribbean. Although Guyana was claimed by the Spanish, who sent periodic patrols through the region, the Dutch gained control over the region early in the 17th century. Dutch sovereignty was officially recognised with the signing of the Treaty of Münster in 1648. European contact and colonisation would have a "catastrophic effect" on indigenous communities, due to diseases, Indian slave trade, intense warfare, and forced migration.

In 1621 the government of the Netherlands gave the newly formed Dutch West India Company (WIC) complete control over the trading post on the Essequibo. This Dutch commercial concern administered the colony, known as Essequibo, for more than 170 years. The company established a second colony, on the Berbice River southeast of Essequibo, in 1627. Although under the general jurisdiction of this private group, the settlement, named Berbice, was governed separately. Demerara, situated between Essequibo and Berbice, was settled in 1741, and emerged in 1773 as a separate colony under the direct control of the Dutch WIC. In these colonies, enslaved Africans produced "coffee, sugar and cotton [...] for the Dutch market."

Although the Dutch colonisers initially were motivated by the prospect of trade in the Caribbean, their possessions became significant producers of crops. The growing importance of agriculture was indicated by the export of 15,000 kilograms of tobacco from Essequibo in 1623. But as the agricultural productivity of the Dutch colonies increased, a labour shortage emerged. The indigenous populations were poorly adapted for work on plantations, and many people died from diseases introduced by the Europeans. The early Dutch settlers, pushed Indigenous Indians out of their homelands and those they couldn't they wipe out with a combination of strategy and "superior military technology". Ultimately, Dutch presence in Guyana resulted in internal rather than outward migration of Indians, in part due to pull and push of Dutch trade. Although effective jurisdiction from the Dutch "touched relatively few Indians", relations between the Dutch and Indigenous people were "often punctuated by physical conflicts". The Dutch West India Company turned to the importation of enslaved Africans, who rapidly became a key element in the colonial economy. By the 1660s, the enslaved population numbered about 2,500; the number of indigenous people was estimated at 50,000, most of whom had retreated into the vast hinterland. Although enslaved Africans were considered an essential element of the colonial economy, their working conditions were brutal. The mortality rate was high, and the dismal conditions led to more than half a dozen rebellions led by the enslaved Africans. At the end of the eighteenth century, the number of people who were enslaved within Guyana was "roughly equal that in Suriname" while millions were invested so that goods could be created for Dutch market "using forced labour by African people".

The most famous uprising of the enslaved Africans, the Berbice Slave Uprising, began in February 1763. On two plantations on the Canje River in Berbice, the enslaved Africans rebelled, taking control of the region. As plantation after plantation fell to the enslaved Africans, the European population fled; eventually only half of the whites who had lived in the colony remained. Led by Coffy (now the national hero of Guyana), the escaped enslaved Africans came to number about 3,000 and threatened European control over the Guianas. The rebels were defeated with the assistance of troops from neighbouring colonies, such as the British and French, and the Dutch Sint Eustatius, and overseas from the Dutch Republic. The 1763 Monument on Square of the Revolution in Georgetown, Guyana commemorates the uprising.

=== Transition to British Rule ===
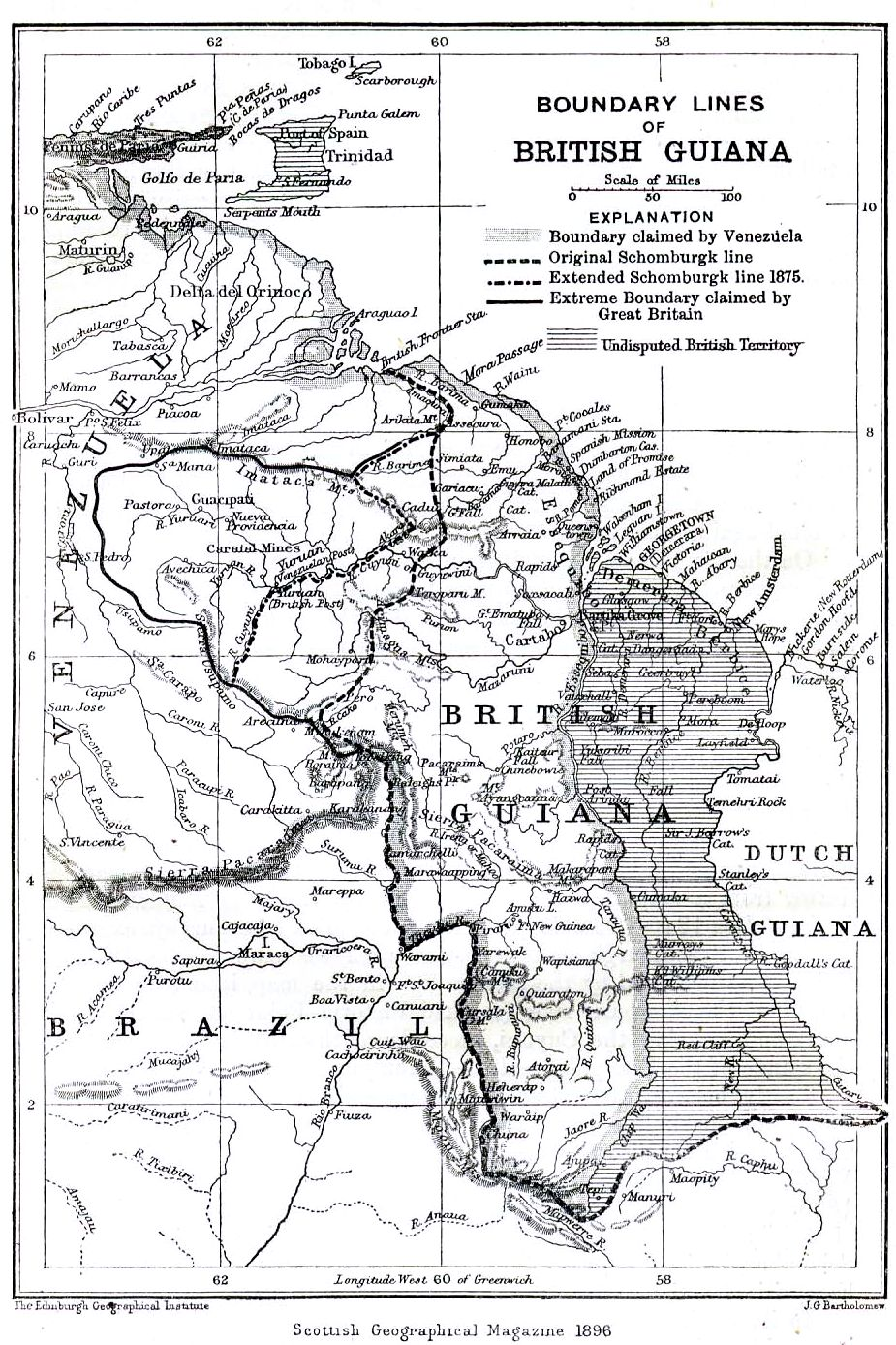
Map of British Guiana.

Eager to attract more settlers, in 1746 the Dutch authorities opened the area near the Demerara River to British immigrants. British plantation owners in the Lesser Antilles had been plagued by poor soil and erosion, and many were lured to the Dutch colonies by richer soils and the promise of land ownership. The influx of British citizens was so great that by 1760 the English constituted a majority of the European population of the Dutch Demerara. By 1786 the internal affairs of this Dutch colony were effectively under British control, though two-thirds of the plantation owners were still Dutch. Under the British, the colonies became a huge cotton producer. This was thanks to the groundwork laid "during the Dutch colonial era".

As economic growth accelerated in Demerara and Essequibo, strains began to appear in the relations between the planters and the Dutch West India Company. Administrative reforms during the early 1770s had greatly increased the cost of government. The company periodically sought to raise taxes to cover these expenditures and thereby provoked the resistance of the planters. In 1781 a war broke out between the Netherlands and Britain, which resulted in the British occupation of Berbice, Essequibo, and Demerara. Some months later, France, allied with the Netherlands, seized control of the colonies. The French governed for two years, during which they constructed a new town, Longchamps, at the mouth of the Demerara River. When the Dutch regained power in 1784, they moved their colonial capital to Longchamps, which they renamed Stabroek. The capital was in 1812 renamed Georgetown by the British.

The return of Dutch rule reignited conflict between the planters of Essequibo and Demerara and the Dutch West India Company. Disturbed by plans for an increase in the slave tax and a reduction in their representation on the colony's judicial and policy councils, the colonists petitioned the Dutch government to consider their grievances. In response, a special committee was appointed, which proceeded to draw up a report called the Concept Plan of Redress. This document called for far-reaching constitutional reforms and later became the basis of the British governmental structure. The plan proposed a decision-making body to be known as the Court of Policy. The judiciary was to consist of two courts of justice, one serving Demerara and the other Essequibo. The membership of the Court of Policy and of the courts of justice would consist of company officials and planters who owned more than twenty-five slaves. The Dutch commission that was assigned the responsibility of implementing this new system of government returned to the Netherlands with extremely unfavourable reports concerning the Dutch West India Company's administration. The company's charter, therefore, was allowed to expire in 1792 and the Concept Plan of Redress was put into effect in Demerara and Essequibo. Renamed the United Colony of Demerara and Essequibo, the area then came under the direct control of the Dutch government. Berbice maintained its status as a separate colony.

The catalyst for formal British takeover was the French Revolution and the subsequent Napoleonic Wars. In 1795 the French occupied the Netherlands. The British declared war on France and in 1796 launched an expeditionary force from Barbados to occupy the Dutch colonies. The British takeover was bloodless, and the local Dutch administration of the colony was left relatively uninterrupted under the constitution provided by the Concept Plan of Redress. Like the Dutch, the British, during their occupation of Guyana, also worried about losing control over Indigenous people. By means of the Treaty of Amiens, both were returned to Dutch control. Peace was short-lived, however. The war between Britain and France resumed in less than a year, and in 1803 Demerara-Essequibo and Berbice were seized once more by British troops. At the London Convention of 1814, both colonies were formally ceded to Britain. In 1831, Berbice and Demerara-Essequibo were unified as British Guiana. The colony would remain under British control until independence in 1966.

=== Origins of the border dispute with Venezuela ===
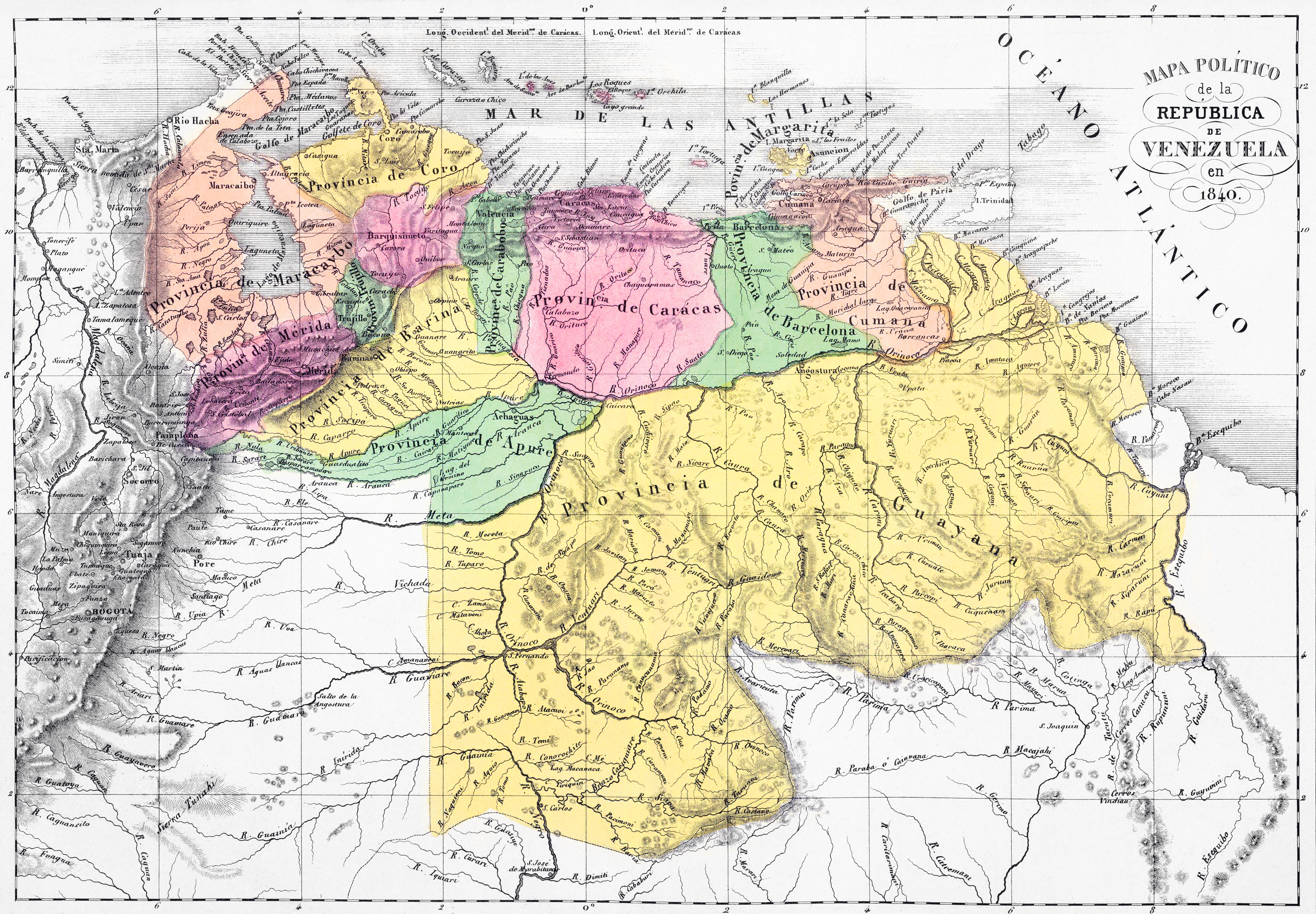
Political map of Venezuela in 1840, extending to the Essequibo border.

When Britain gained formal control over what is now Guyana in 1814, it also became involved in one of Latin America's most persistent border disputes. At the London Convention of 1814, the Dutch surrendered the United Colony of Demerara and Essequibo (Demerara-Essequibo) and Berbice to the British, a colony which had the Essequibo River as its west border with the Spanish colony of Venezuela. Although Spain still claimed the region, the Spanish did not contest the treaty because they were preoccupied with their own colonies' struggles for independence. In 1835 the British government asked German explorer Robert Hermann Schomburgk to map British Guiana and mark its boundaries. As ordered by the British authorities, Schomburgk began British Guiana's western boundary with Venezuela at the mouth of the Orinoco River, although all the Venezuelan maps showed the Essequibo River as the east border of the country. A map of the British colony was published in 1840. Venezuela protested, claiming the entire area west of the Essequibo River. Negotiations between Britain and Venezuela over the boundary began, but the two nations could reach no compromise. In 1850 both agreed not to occupy the disputed zone.

The discovery of gold in the contested area in the late 1850s reignited the dispute. British settlers moved into the region and the British Guiana Mining Company was formed to mine the deposits. Over the years, Venezuela made repeated protests and proposed arbitration, but the British government was uninterested. Venezuela finally broke diplomatic relations with Britain in 1887 and appealed to the United States for help. The British at first rebuffed the United States government's suggestion of arbitration, but when President Grover Cleveland threatened to intervene according to the Monroe Doctrine, Britain agreed to let an international tribunal arbitrate the boundary in 1897.

For two years, the tribunal consisting of two UK, two U.S., and one Russian citizen studied the case in Paris. Their three-to-two decision, handed down in 1899, awarded 94% of the disputed territory to British Guiana. Venezuela received only the mouths of the Orinoco River and a short stretch of the Atlantic coastline just to the east. Although Venezuela was unhappy with the decision, a commission surveyed a new border in accordance with the award, and both sides accepted the boundary in 1905. The issue was considered settled for the next half-century.

From 1990 to 2017, the United Nations Secretary-General attempted to find a solution to the border dispute, with Ban Ki-moon sharing a draft framework to end the dispute. Then, in January 2018, António Guterres chose the UN International Court of Justice to resolve the dispute, believing that he remained committed to helping remove this dispute. Guyana then filed an application beginning "proceedings against Venezuela" in March 2018. This led to ongoing decisions by the International Court of Justice, aimed at ending the dispute.

=== The early British Colony and the labour problem ===
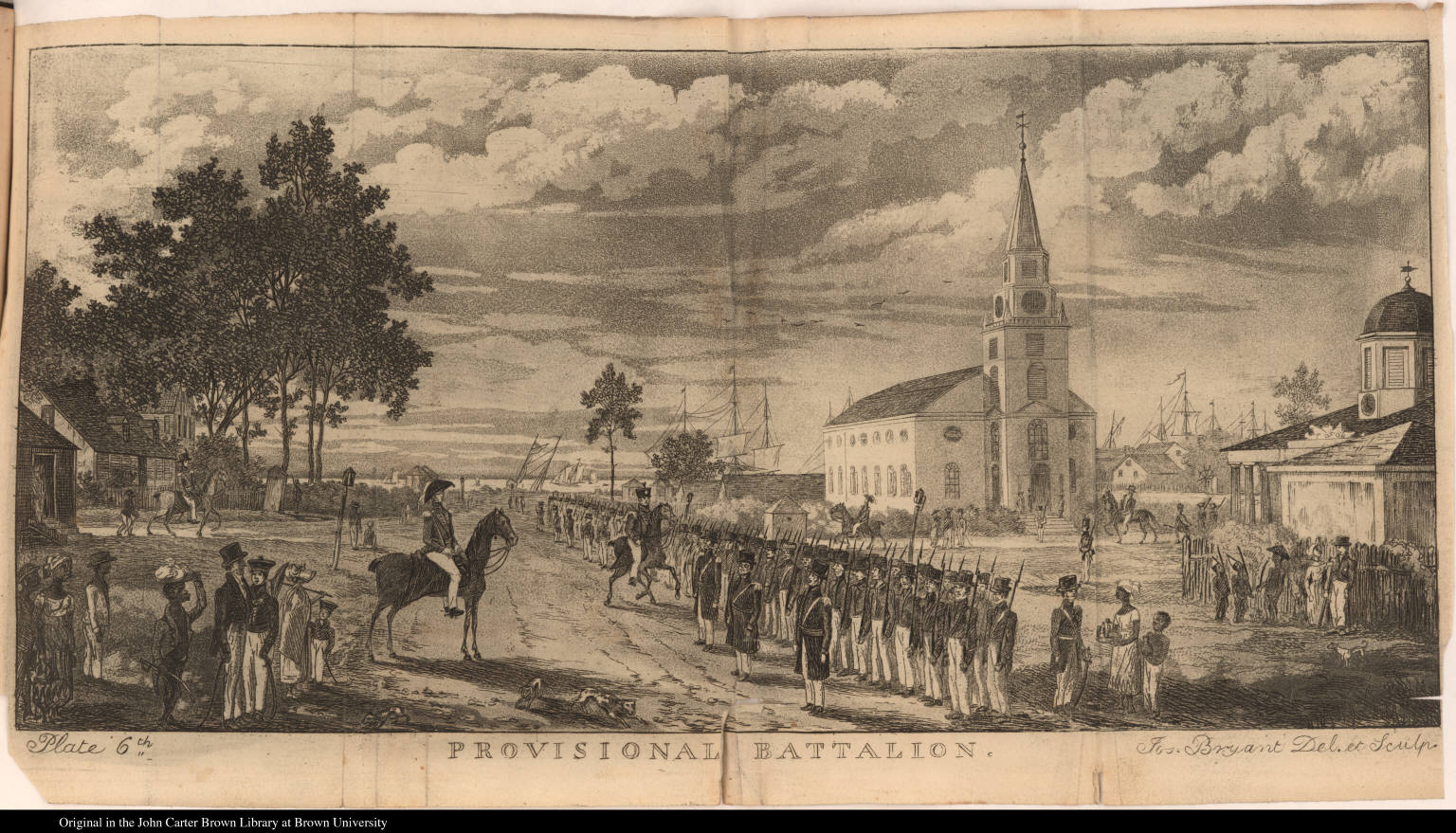
Georgetown in 1823.

Political, economic, and social life in the 19th century was dominated by a European planter class. Although the smallest group in terms of numbers, members of the plantocracy had links to British commercial interests in London and often enjoyed close ties to the governor, who was appointed by the monarch. The plantocracy, including those from Scotland, also controlled exports and the working conditions of the majority of the population. The next social stratum consisted of a small number of freed slaves, many of mixed African and European heritage, in addition to some Portuguese merchants. At the lowest level of society was the majority, the African slaves who lived and worked in the countryside, where the plantations were located. Unconnected to colonial life, small groups of Amerindians lived in the hinterland. The British believed that Indigenous people in Guyana would be an important as a form of security "in times of slave uprisings". Under the British, the colonies even became probably the biggest cotton producers in the world, something that was only possible because of the basis that was laid during the Dutch colonial era. One scholar, Bram Hoonhout, believed that without support from Indigenous groups, there would have been many more uprisings by enslaved people.

Colonial life was changed radically by the demise of slavery. Although the international slave trade was abolished in the British Empire in 1807, slavery itself continued. In what is known as the Demerara rebellion of 1823 10–13,000 slaves in Demerara-Essequibo rose up against their oppressors. Although the rebellion was easily crushed, the momentum for abolition remained, and by 1838 total emancipation had been effected. The end of slavery had several ramifications. Most significantly, many former slaves rapidly departed the plantations. Some ex-slaves moved to towns and villages, feeling that field labour was degrading and inconsistent with freedom, but others pooled their resources to purchase the abandoned estates of their former masters and created village communities. Establishing small settlements provided the new Afro-Guyanese communities an opportunity to grow and sell food, an extension of a practice under which slaves had been allowed to keep the money that came from the sale of any surplus produce. The emergence of an independent-minded Afro-Guyanese peasant class, however, threatened the planters' political power, inasmuch as the planters no longer held a near-monopoly on the colony's economic activity.

For some plantation owners, Guyana had more "fertile territory" and gained more "substantial profits", even after abolition of slavery, than any of their plantations elsewhere, whether in Trinidad and Tobago, St. Lucia, Nevis, or Jamaica. At the time that the Slavery Abolition Act 1833 was passed, chattel slavery was ended, and the 46,000 slaveowners in Britain and its colonies were compensated for "property" loss. Some scholars stated that British Guinea used more fixed capital per slave than other colonies, like use of large boiling-houses and steam engines.

Emancipation also resulted in the introduction of new ethnic and cultural groups into British Guiana. The departure of the Afro-Guyanese from the sugar plantations soon led to labour shortages. After unsuccessful attempts throughout the 19th century to attract Portuguese workers from Madeira, the estate owners were again left with an inadequate supply of labour. Portuguese Guyanese had not taken to plantation work and soon moved into other parts of the economy, especially retail business, where they became competitors with the new Afro-Guyanese middle class. Some 14,000 Chinese came to the colony between 1853 and 1912. Like their Portuguese predecessors, the Chinese Guyanese forsook the plantations for the retail trades and soon became assimilated into Guianese society.

Concerned about the plantations' shrinking labour pool and the potential decline of the sugar sector, British authorities, like their counterparts in Dutch Guiana, began to contract for the services of poorly paid indentured workers from India. The East Indians, as this group was known locally, signed on for a certain number of years, after which, in theory, they would return to India with their savings from working in the sugar fields. The introduction of indentured East Indian workers alleviated the labour shortage and added another group to Guyana's ethnic mix. A majority of the Indo-Guyanese workers had their origins in eastern Uttar Pradesh, with a smaller amount coming from Tamil and Telugu speaking areas in southern India. A small minority of these workers came from other areas such as Bengal, Punjab, and Gujarat. The indenture service in Guyana, which began with the arrival of 396 immigrants from India known as the "Gladstone Coolies" in May 1838, would not end until 1917.

== Political and social awakenings ==
=== Nineteenth-century British Guiana ===
The constitution of the British colony favoured the white and South Asian planters. Planter political power was based in the Court of Policy and the two courts of justice, established in the late 18th century under Dutch rule. The Court of Policy had both legislative and administrative functions and was composed of the governor, three colonial officials, and four colonists, with the governor presiding. The courts of justice resolved judicial matters, such as licensing and civil service appointments, which were brought before them by petition. In addition, the first police force for the colony was established in July 1839.

Raising and disbursing revenue was the responsibility of the Combined Court, which included members of the Court of Policy and six additional financial representatives appointed by the College of Electors. In 1855 the Combined Court also assumed responsibility for setting the salaries of all government officials. This duty made the Combined Court a centre of intrigues resulting in periodic clashes between the governor and the planters.

Other Guyanese began to demand a more representative political system in the 19th century. By the late 1880s, pressure from the new Afro-Guyanese middle class was building for constitutional reform. In particular, there were calls to convert the Court of Policy into an assembly with ten elected members, to ease voter qualifications, and to abolish the College of Electors. Reforms were resisted by the planters, led by Henry K. Davson, owner of a large plantation. In London the planters had allies in the West India Committee and also in the West India Association of Glasgow, both presided over by proprietors with major interests in British Guiana. During this period, Indian migrants started to move to British Guiana and settle there.

Constitutional revisions in 1891 incorporated some of the changes demanded by the reformers. The planters lost political influence with the abolition of the College of Electors and the relaxation of voter qualification. At the same time, the Court of Policy was enlarged to sixteen members; eight of these were to be elected members whose power would be balanced by that of eight appointed members. The Combined Court also continued, consisting, as previously, of the Court of Policy and six financial representatives who were now elected. To ensure that there would be no shift of power to elected officials, the governor remained the head of the Court of Policy; the executive duties of the Court of Policy were transferred to a new Executive Council, which the governor and planters dominated. The 1891 revisions were a great disappointment to the colony's reformers. As a result of the 1892 elections, the membership of the new Combined Court was almost identical to that of the previous one. The next three decades saw additional, although minor, political changes. In 1897 the secret ballot was introduced. A reform in 1909 expanded the limited British Guiana electorate, and for the first time, Afro-Guyanese constituted a majority of the eligible voters.

Political changes were accompanied by social change and jockeying by various ethnic groups for increased power. The British and Dutch planters refused to accept the Portuguese as equals and sought to maintain their status as aliens with no rights in the colony, especially voting rights. The political tensions led the Portuguese to establish the Reform Association. After the anti-Portuguese riots of 1898, the Portuguese recognised the need to work with other disenfranchised elements of Guyanese society, in particular the Afro-Guyanese. By around the start of the 20th century, organisations including the Reform Association and the Reform Club began to demand greater participation in the colony's affairs. These organisations were largely the instruments of a small but articulate emerging middle class. Although the new middle class sympathised with the working class, the middle-class political groups were hardly representative of a national political or social movement. Indeed, working-class grievances were usually expressed in the form of riots.

=== Political and social changes in the early twentieth century ===
The 1905 Ruimveldt Riots rocked British Guiana. The severity of these outbursts reflected the workers' widespread dissatisfaction with their standard of living. The uprising began in late November 1905 when the Georgetown stevedores went on strike, demanding higher wages. The strike grew confrontational, and other workers struck in sympathy, creating the country's first urban-rural worker alliance. On 30 November crowds of people took to the streets of Georgetown, and by 1 December 1905, now referred to as 'Black Friday', the situation had spun out of control. At the Plantation Ruimveldt, close to Georgetown, a large crowd of porters refused to disperse when ordered to do so by a police patrol and a detachment of artillery. The colonial authorities opened fire, and four workers were seriously injured.

Even though World War I was fought far beyond the borders of British Guiana, the war altered Guyanese society. The Afro-Guyanese who joined the British military became the nucleus of an elite Afro-Guyanese community upon their return. World War I also led to the end of East Indian indentured service. British concerns over political stability in India and criticism by Indian nationalists that the program was a form of human bondage caused the British government to outlaw indentured labour in 1917.

In the closing years of World War I, the colony's first trade union was formed. The British Guiana Labour Union (BGLU) was established in 1917 under the leadership of H.N. Critchlow and led by Alfred A. Thorne. Formed in the face of widespread business opposition, the BGLU at first mostly represented Afro-Guyanese dockworkers. Its membership stood around 13,000 by 1920, and it was granted legal status in 1921 under the Trades Union Ordinance. Although recognition of other unions would not come until 1939, the BGLU was an indication that the working class was becoming politically aware and more concerned with its rights.

The second trade union, the British Guiana Workers' League, was established in 1931 by Alfred A. Thorne, who served as the League's leader for 22 years. The League sought to improve the working conditions for people of all ethnic backgrounds in the colony. Most workers were of West African, East Indian, Chinese and Portuguese descent, and had been brought to the country under a system of forced or indentured labour.

After World War I, new economic interest groups began to clash with the Combined Court. The country's economy had come to depend less on sugar and more on rice and bauxite, and producers of these new commodities resented the sugar planters' continued domination of the Combined Court. Meanwhile, the planters were feeling the effects of lower sugar prices and wanted the Combined Court to provide the necessary funds for new drainage and irrigation programs.

To stop the bickering and resultant legislative paralysis, in 1928 the Colonial Office announced a new constitution that would make British Guiana a crown colony under the tight control of a governor appointed by the Colonial Office. The Combined Court and the Court of Policy were replaced by a Legislative Council with a majority of appointed members. To middle-class and working-class political activists, this new constitution represented a step backward and a victory for the planters. Influence over the governor, rather than the promotion of a particular public policy, became the most important issue in any political campaign.

The Great Depression of the 1930s brought economic hardship to all segments of Guyanese society. All of the colony's major exports—sugar, rice and bauxite—were affected by low prices, and unemployment soared. As in the past, the working class found itself lacking a political voice during a time of worsening economic conditions. By the mid-1930s, British Guiana and the whole British Caribbean were marked by labour unrest and violent demonstrations. In the aftermath of riots throughout the British West Indies, a royal commission under Lord Moyne was established to determine the reasons for the riots and to make recommendations.

In British Guiana, the Moyne Commission questioned a wide range of people, including trade unionists, Afro-Guyanese professionals, and representatives of the Indo-Guyanese community. The commission pointed out the deep division between the country's two largest ethnic groups, the Afro-Guyanese and the Indo-Guyanese. The largest group, the Indo-Guyanese, consisted primarily of rural rice producers or merchants; they had retained the country's traditional culture and did not participate in national politics. The Afro-Guyanese were largely urban workers or bauxite miners; they had adopted European culture and dominated national politics. To increase the representation of the majority of the population in British Guiana, the Moyne Commission called for increased democratisation of government as well as economic and social reforms.

The Moyne Commission report in 1939 was a turning point for British Guiana. It urged extending the franchise to women and persons not owning land and encouraged the emerging trade union movement. However, none of the Moyne Commission's recommendations were immediately implemented because of the outbreak of World War II. The country's rice industry, which had stagnated between the two World Wars, expanded, with Guyana gaining a "virtual monopoly of the West Indies market" by the war's end.

With the fighting far away, and the country as part of the Allies due to British colonial rule, the period of World War II, in British Guiana, was marked by continuing political reform and improvements to the national infrastructure. The governor, Sir Gordon Lethem, created the country's first Ten-Year Development Plan, reduced property qualifications for office holding and voting, and made elective members a majority on the Legislative Council in 1943. Under the aegis of the Lend-Lease Act of 1941, a modern air base (now Timehri Airport) was constructed by United States troops. By the end of World War II, British Guiana's political system had been widened to encompass more elements of society and the economy's foundations had been strengthened by increased demand for bauxite.

== Pre-independence government ==
=== Development of political parties ===
At the end of World War II, political awareness and demands for independence grew in all segments of society. The immediate postwar period witnessed the founding of Guyana's major political parties. The People's Progressive Party (PPP) was founded on 1 January 1950. Internal conflicts developed in the PPP, and in 1957 the People's National Congress (PNC) was created as a split-off. These years also saw the beginning of a long and acrimonious struggle between the country's two dominant political personalities—Cheddi Jagan and Linden Forbes Burnham. The U.S. government favoured Burnham over Jagan, an effort to prevent the Soviet Union from "gaining a foothold on the South American continent", with the country serving "special significance" during the Cold War.

==== Cheddi Jagan ====
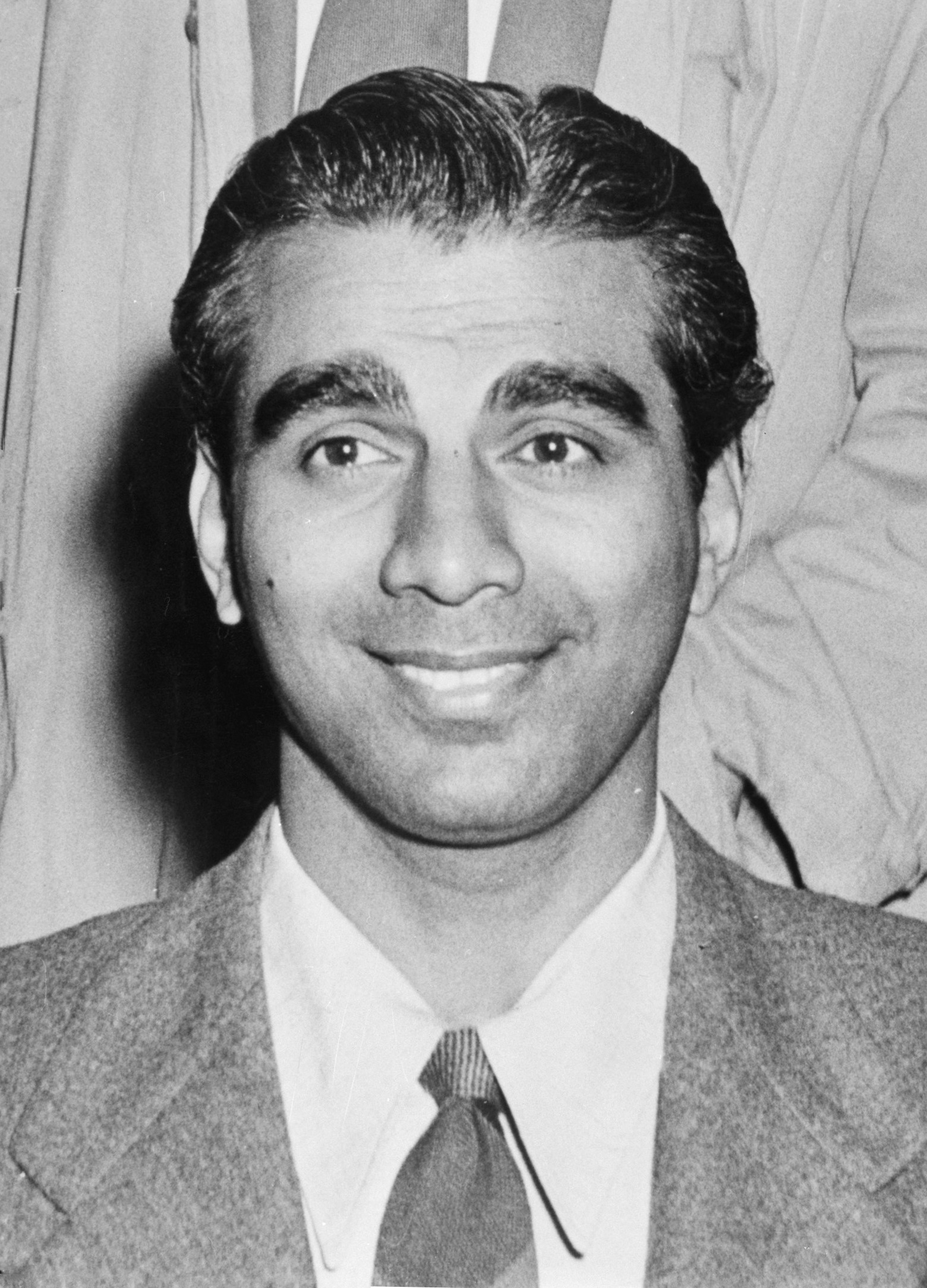
Cheddi Jagan

Cheddi Jagan had been born in Guyana in 1918. His parents were immigrants from India. His father was a driver, a position considered to be on the lowest rung of the middle stratum of Guyanese society. Jagan's childhood gave him a lasting insight into rural poverty. Despite their poor background, the senior Jagan sent his son to Queen's College in Georgetown. After his education there, Jagan went to the United States to study dentistry, graduating from Northwestern University in Evanston, Illinois in 1942.

Jagan returned to British Guiana in October 1943 and was soon joined by his U.S. wife, the former Janet Rosenberg, who would play a significant role in her new country's political development. Although Jagan established his own dentistry clinic, he was soon enmeshed in politics. After a number of unsuccessful forays into Guyana's political life, Jagan became treasurer of the Manpower Citizens' Association (MPCA) in 1945. The MPCA represented the colony's sugar workers, many of whom were Indo-Guyanese. Jagan's tenure was brief, as he clashed repeatedly with the more moderate union leadership over policy issues. Despite his departure from the MPCA a year after joining, the position allowed Jagan to meet other union leaders in British Guiana and throughout the English-speaking Caribbean.

==== Linden Forbes Sampson Burnham ====
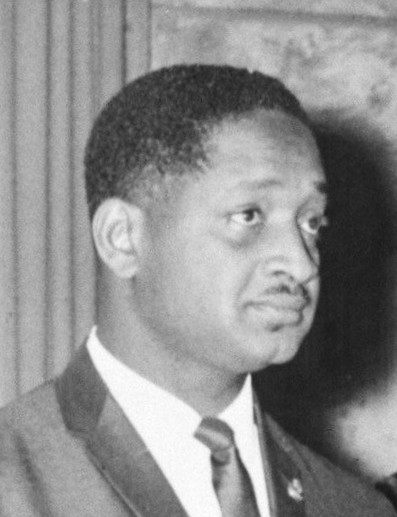
Forbes Burnham

Born in 1923, Forbes Burnham was the sole son in a family that had three children. His father was headmaster of Kitty Methodist Primary School, which was located just outside Georgetown. As part of the colony's educated class, young Burnham was exposed to political viewpoints at an early age. He did exceedingly well in school and went to London to obtain a law degree. Although not exposed to childhood poverty as was Jagan, Burnham was acutely aware of racial discrimination.

The social strata of the urban Afro-Guyanese community of the 1930s and 1940s included a mulatto or "coloured" elite, a black professional middle-class, and, at the bottom, the black working-class. Unemployment in the 1930s was high. When war broke out in 1939, many Afro-Guyanese joined the military, hoping to gain new job skills and escape poverty. When they returned home from the war, however, jobs were still scarce and discrimination was still a part of life. At that time, Guyana had a low gross national product, but mineral resources such as silver, wheat, timber, peanuts, and food processing.

==== Founding of the PAC and PPP ====
The springboard for Jagan's political career was the Political Affairs Committee (PAC), formed in 1946 as a discussion group. The new organisation published the PAC Bulletin to promote its Marxist ideology and ideas of liberation and decolonisation. The PAC's outspoken criticism of the colony's poor living standards attracted followers as well as detractors.

In the November 1947 general elections, the PAC put forward several members as independent candidates. The PAC's major competitor was the newly formed British Guiana Labour Party (BGLP), which, under J.B. Singh, won six of fourteen seats contested. Jagan won a seat and briefly joined the Labour Party. But he had difficulties with his new party's centre-right ideology and soon left its ranks. The Labour Party's support of the policies of the British governor and its inability to create a grass-roots base gradually stripped it of liberal supporters throughout the country. The Labour Party's lack of a clear-cut reform agenda left a vacuum, which Jagan rapidly moved to fill. Turmoil on the colony's sugar plantations gave him an opportunity to achieve national standing. After the 16 June 1948 police shootings of five Indo-Guyanese workers at Enmore, close to Georgetown, the PAC and the Guiana Industrial Workers' Union (GIWU) organised a large and peaceful demonstration, which clearly enhanced Jagan's standing with the Indo-Guyanese population.

After the PAC, Jagan's next major step was the founding of the People's Progressive Party (PPP) in January 1950. Using the PAC as a foundation, Jagan created from it a new party that drew support from both the Afro-Guyanese and Indo-Guyanese communities. To increase support among the Afro-Guyanese, Forbes Burnham was brought into the party.

The PPP's initial leadership was multi-ethnic and left of centre, but hardly revolutionary. Jagan became the leader of the PPP's parliamentary group, and Burnham assumed the responsibilities of party chairman. Other key party members included Janet Jagan, Brindley Benn and Ashton Chase, both PAC veterans. The new party's first victory came in the 1950 municipal elections, in which Janet Jagan won a seat. Cheddi Jagan and Burnham failed to win seats, but Burnham's campaign made a favourable impression on many Afro-Guyanese citizens.

From its first victory in the 1950 municipal election, the PPP gathered momentum. However, the party's often strident anticapitalist and socialist message made the British government uneasy. Colonial officials showed their displeasure with the PPP in 1952 when, on a regional tour, the Jagans were designated prohibited immigrants in Trinidad and Grenada. The previous year, Jagan wrote a letter to the Czechoslovak Communist Party, with a request for assistance from the party, and would visit Czechoslavkia in August 1951.

A British commission in 1950 recommended universal adult suffrage and the adoption of a ministerial system for British Guiana. The commission also recommended that power be concentrated in the executive branch, that is, the office of the governor. These reforms presented British Guiana's parties with an opportunity to participate in national elections and form a government, but maintained power in the hands of the British-appointed chief executive. This arrangement rankled the PPP, which saw it as an attempt to curtail the party's political power.

=== The first PPP government ===
Once the new constitution was adopted, elections were set for 1953. The PPP's coalition of lower-class Afro-Guyanese and rural Indo-Guyanese workers, together with elements of both ethnic groups' middle sectors, made for a formidable constituency. Conservatives branded the PPP as communist, but the party campaigned on a centre-left platform and appealed to a growing nationalism. The other major party participating in the election, the National Democratic Party (NDP), was a spin-off of the League of Coloured Peoples and was largely an Afro-Guyanese middle-class organisation, sprinkled with middle-class Portuguese and Indo-Guyanese. The NDP, together with the poorly organised United Farmers and Workers Party and the United National Party, was soundly defeated by the PPP. Final results gave the PPP eighteen of twenty-four seats compared with the NDP's two seats and four seats for independents.

The PPP's first administration was brief. The legislature opened on 30 May 1953. Already suspicious of Jagan and the PPP's radicalism, conservative forces in the business community were further distressed by the new administration's program of expanding the role of the state in the economy and society. The PPP also sought to implement its reform program at a rapid pace, which brought the party into confrontation with the governor and with high-ranking civil servants who preferred more gradual change. The issue of civil service appointments also threatened the PPP, in this case from within. Following the 1953 victory, these appointments became an issue between the predominantly Indo-Guyanese supporters of Jagan and the largely Afro-Guyanese backers of Burnham. Burnham threatened to split the party if he were not made sole leader of the PPP. A compromise was reached by which members of what had become Burnham's faction received ministerial appointments.

The PPP's introduction of the Labour Relations Act provoked a confrontation with the British. This law ostensibly was aimed at reducing intraunion rivalries, but would have favoured the GIWU, which was closely aligned with the ruling party. The opposition charged that the PPP was seeking to gain control over the colony's economic and social life and was moving to stifle the opposition. The day the act was introduced to the legislature, the GIWU went on strike in support of the proposed law. The British government interpreted this intermingling of party politics and labour unionism as a direct challenge to the constitution and the authority of the governor. The day after the act was passed, on 9 October 1953, London suspended the colony's constitution. Under pretext of quelling disturbances, the British sent in troops. Subsequently, Jagan was forced to resign as Chief Minister after 133 days. Britain installed an interim government. It would remain in place until 1957.

Following this action, Britain would keep Guyana under military occupation, for seven years, with restricted civil liberties, and make Jagan a political prisoner. Writing in The Guardian, Gaiutra Bahadur argued that "the overthrow of Guyana's ruling party by colonial forces fomented a racial divide that continues to blight its politics", saying that there was a greater crackdown on the Afro-Guyanese than on the Indo-Guyanese, in a deliberate and successful attempt to divide the PPP. Then-British Prime Minister Winston Churchill said they need to do everything they could to "break the communist teeth in British Guiana". In 2000, U.S. historian William Blum added that beginning in 1953, and ending in 1964, the U.S. and Britain made life "extremely difficult" for Jagan and his government, because he was building a society which showcased a "successful...alternative...to the capital model". Tactics used included disinformation, terrorism, legalism, and general strikes, all aimed at forcing him from office.

=== The second PPP government ===
The 1957 elections held under a new constitution demonstrated the extent of the growing ethnic division within the Guyanese electorate. The revised constitution provided limited self-government, primarily through the Legislative Council. Of the council's twenty-four delegates, fifteen were elected, six were nominated, and the remaining three were to be ex officio members from the interim administration. The two wings of the PPP, which had split two years prior, launched vigorous campaigns, each attempting to prove that it was the legitimate heir to the original party. Despite denials of such motivation, both factions made a strong appeal to their respective ethnic constituencies.

The 1957 elections were convincingly won by Jagan's PPP faction. Although his group had a secure parliamentary majority, its support was drawn more and more from the Indo-Guyanese community. The faction's main planks were increasingly identified as Indo-Guyanese: more rice land, improved union representation in the sugar industry, and improved business opportunities and more government posts for Indo-Guyanese.

Jagan's veto of British Guiana's participation in the West Indies Federation, favoured by the British colonial authorities, caused his party to lose significant Afro-Guyanese support. In the late 1950s, the British Caribbean colonies had been actively negotiating establishment of a West Indies Federation. The PPP had pledged to work for the eventual political union of British Guiana with the Caribbean territories. The Indo-Guyanese, who constituted a majority in Guyana, were apprehensive of becoming part of a federation in which they would be outnumbered by people of African descent.

Burnham learned an important lesson from the 1957 elections. He could not win if supported only by the lower-class, urban Afro-Guyanese. He needed middle-class allies, especially those Afro-Guyanese who backed the moderate United Democratic Party. From 1957 onward, Burnham worked to create a balance between maintaining the backing of the more radical Afro-Guyanese lower classes and gaining the support of the more capitalist middle class. Clearly, Burnham's stated preference for socialism would not bind those two groups together against Jagan, an avowed Marxist. The answer was something more basic: race. Burnham's move toward the right was accomplished with the merger of his PPP faction and the United Democratic Party into a new organisation, the People's National Congress (PNC). The political split deepened the racial division between Afro-Guyanese and Indo-Guyanese, with that racial division, in the country's politics, continuing to the present. After the split, Jagan's PPP and Burnham's PNC largely became the political expressions of the Indo-Guyanese and Afro-Guyanese aspirations respectively, and advocated for their supporter's interests.

Following the 1957 elections, Jagan rapidly consolidated his hold on the Indo-Guyanese community. Though candid in expressing his admiration for Joseph Stalin, Mao Zedong, and, later, Fidel Castro Ruz, Jagan in power asserted that the PPP's Marxist-Leninist principles must be adapted to Guyana's own particular circumstances. Jagan advocated nationalisation of foreign holdings, especially in the sugar industry. British fears of a communist takeover, however, caused the British governor to hold Jagan's more radical policy initiatives in check, while Jagan remained as Minister of Trade and Industry.

=== PPP re-election and aftermath ===
The 1961 elections were a bitter contest between the PPP, the PNC, and the United Force (UF), a conservative party representing big business, the Roman Catholic Church, and Amerindian, Chinese, and Portuguese voters. These elections were held under yet another new constitution that marked a return to the degree of self-government that existed briefly in 1953. It introduced a bicameral system boasting a wholly elected thirty-five-member Legislative Assembly and a thirteen-member Senate to be appointed by the governor. The post of Prime Minister was created and was to be filled by the majority party in the Legislative Assembly. With the strong support of the Indo-Guyanese population, the PPP again won by a substantial margin, gaining twenty seats in the Legislative Assembly, compared to eleven seats for the PNC and four for the UF. Jagan was named Prime Minister. Following this election, President John F. Kennedy would approve a covert operation to "destroy and expose" communists in the country. This followed previous U.S. efforts to nudge Jagan in a "pro-U.S. direction."

Jagan's administration became increasingly friendly with communist and leftist regimes; for instance, Jagan refused to observe the United States embargo on communist Cuba. After discussions between Jagan and Cuban revolutionary Ernesto "Che" Guevara in 1960 and 1961, Cuba offered British Guiana loans and equipment. In addition, the Jagan administration signed trade agreements with Hungary and the German Democratic Republic (East Germany). Beginning in 1962, the U.S. government would start covert action programs in the country. Lasting until 1968, over US$2 million would be spent, according to U.S. State Department documents. President John F. Kennedy, in mid-1962, would state his objection to Jagan's government, and argue that the U.S. could not "afford to see another Castro-type regime established in this Hemisphere." Even so, some, such as Arthur M. Schlesinger, Jr., took a more moderate view of Jagan.

Jagan would become others harboured suspicions of him. Although he would even meet with U.S. President Kennedy in October 1962, he would believe that the CIA had fomented riots earlier that year when he introduced an austerity budget which increased a tax increase which "fell mainly on Guiana's African and mixed population". The same year, Kennedy direct talks with Harold Macmillan, then the British Prime Minister. Other U.S. officials would meet with opposition leaders such as Forbes Burnham and Peter d'Aguiar, believing Burnham's socialism was preferable to Jagan, and the British agreed to delay the country's independence. CARICOM later stated that 1962 to 1964 was a period of "prolonged labour and racial unrest". In 2005, Marc J. Susser, a historian working for U.S. State Department Bureau of Public Affairs, would admit that the U.S. government aimed at preventing Jagan from becoming Prime Minister and supported Burnham instead.

From 1961 to 1964, Jagan was confronted with a destabilisation campaign conducted by the PNC and UF. In addition to domestic opponents of Jagan, an important role was played by the U.S. American Institute for Free Labour Development (AIFLD), alleged to be a CIA front organisation. Various reports say that AIFLD, with a budget of US$800,000, maintained anti-Jagan labour leaders on its payroll, as well as an AIFLD-trained staff of 11 activists who were assigned to organise riots and destabilise the Jagan government. Riots and demonstrations against the PPP administration were frequent, and during disturbances in 1962 and 1963 mobs destroyed part of Georgetown, doing US$40 million in damage. The U.S. funded "splinter and opposition groups" opposing Jagan, in part because of his "close ties" to Fidel Castro, with the AFL-CIO and CIA allegedly inciting "racially charged strikes and riots".

To counter the MPCA with its link to Burnham, the PPP formed the Guiana Agricultural Workers Union. This new union's political mandate was to organise the Indo-Guyanese sugarcane field-workers. The MPCA immediately responded with a one-day strike to emphasise its continued control over the sugar workers. In March 1964, when the Jagan government moved to expel Meakins from the country, U.S. consul Carlson intervened to prevent it. Earlier, he had attempted to neutralise the Guianese Trades Union Council. However, William Howard McCabe helped the strikers, while U.S. labour unions worked alongside him, as part of a covert CIA labour operation.

By early 1963, the diplomatic representation of the U.S. in Georgetown changed to general consulate, which included a "CIA communications backchannel". Through that backchannel, Burham provided assurances to the CIA about what his political program would be, resulting in the agency sending him financial assistance. He had become the "CIA's instrument" against Jagan. At the same time, Burham supported proportional representation, as did D'Augilar, which the government resisted, leading to more discord. Before the election in 1964 began, the British unilaterally imposed a "proportional representation electoral format" in Guyana. McCabe met with the unionists in the country, the CIA proposed a paper which reportedly outlined "a project to influence that election". In addition, the CIA would start a political party to draw off the PPP's support. Jagan retained no desire to make a coalition government with Burnham and the PPP.

=== Jagan's ouster and Burnham's victory ===
The PPP government responded to the strike in March 1964 by publishing a new Labour Relations Bill almost identical to the 1953 legislation that had resulted in British intervention. Regarded as a power play for control over a key labour sector, introduction of the proposed law prompted protests and rallies throughout the capital. Riots broke out on 5 April; they were followed on 18 April by a general strike. By 9 May, the governor was compelled to declare a state of emergency. Nevertheless, the strike and violence continued until 7 July, when the Labour Relations Bill was allowed to lapse without being enacted. To bring an end to the disorder, the government agreed to consult with union representatives before introducing similar bills. These disturbances exacerbated tension and animosity between the two major ethnic communities and made a reconciliation between Jagan and Burnham, who had different political outlooks, an impossibility.

Jagan's term had not yet ended when another round of labour unrest rocked the colony. The pro-PPP GIWU, which had become an umbrella group of all labour organisations, called on sugar workers to strike in January 1964. To dramatise their case, Jagan led a march by sugar workers from the interior to Georgetown. This demonstration ignited outbursts of violence that soon escalated beyond the control of the authorities. On 22 May the governor finally declared another state of emergency. The situation continued to worsen, and in June the governor assumed full powers, rushed in British troops to restore order, and proclaimed a moratorium on all political activity. By the end of the turmoil, 160 people were dead and more than 1,000 homes had been destroyed.

In an effort to quell the turmoil, the country's political parties asked the British government to modify the constitution to provide for more proportional representation. The colonial secretary proposed a fifty-three member unicameral legislature. Despite opposition from the ruling PPP, all reforms were implemented and new elections set for October 1964. As Jagan feared, the PPP lost the general elections of 1964. The politics of aapan jaat, Guyanese Hindustani for "vote for your own kind", were becoming entrenched in Guyana. The PPP won 46 percent of the vote and twenty-four seats, which made it the largest single party but short of an overall majority. However, the PNC, which won 40% of the vote and twenty-two seats, and the UF, which won 11% of the vote and seven seats, formed a coalition. The socialist PNC and unabashedly capitalist UF had joined forces to keep the PPP out of office for another term. Jagan called the election fraudulent and refused to resign as Prime Minister. The constitution was amended to allow the governor to remove Jagan from office.

Burnham became Prime Minister on 14 December 1964. Following this, the U.S. began a strong working relationship with the country. The U.S. later encouraged loans and economic assistance from the International Monetary Fund (IMF) to limit Cuban and Soviet influence and promote the country's economic development. Following his victory, Burham would retain a "firm grip" on the country until his death in 1985, which involved constitutional changes, elevating the PPP, tight media control, "state violence to suppress dissent," while those of Indian descent experienced systemic discrimination. The UK and U.S. believed he was a "lesser evil" as compared to Jagan, who was sidelined for "three decades" because he was described as a Marxist. The U.S.-British effort, which began in 1953, to force Chagan out of office had been successful. Some scholars described Burnham's victory as the beginning of a "long, repressive era" in the country's history.

== Independence and the Burnham era ==
=== Burnham in power ===
In the first year under Forbes Burnham, conditions in the colony began to stabilise. The new coalition administration broke diplomatic ties with Cuba and implemented policies that favoured local investors and foreign industry. This included the establishment of the Bank of Guyana in October 1965. The colony applied the renewed flow of Western aid to further development of its infrastructure. A constitutional conference was held in London; the conference set 26 May 1966 as the date for the colony's independence from the United Kingdom. The sitting of the country's first Parliament happened on 26 May 1966, when the Guyana Independence Act came into effect, and day of the country's independence. The country also joined the Commonwealth of Nations in 1966.

The newly independent Guyana at first sought to improve relations with its neighbours. For instance, in December 1965 the country had become a charter member of the Caribbean Free Trade Association (Carifta). Relations with Venezuela were not so placid, however. In 1962 Venezuela had announced that it was rejecting the 1899 boundary and would renew its claim to all of Guyana west of the Essequibo River. In 1966, Venezuela seized the Guyanese half of Ankoko Island, in the Cuyuni River, and two years later claimed a strip of sea along Guyana's western coast. The U.S. government would soon recognise independence of the country and establish a U.S. embassy in Georgetown. Guyana had been under British rule. Delmar R. Carlson was appointed as the first U.S. Chargé d'Affaires ad interim to Guyana. However, a memorandum in October 1965, by chief analysts of the CIA would note the weaknesses of Burnham, the continued strength of Jagan, and argued that Burham would need "support from East Indians to be successful". They believed that this would result in him turning to Canada, the U.S., and UK for aid to accomplish those goals.

The U.S. Central Intelligence Agency (CIA) later argued that following independence in 1966, the country has been "ruled mostly by socialist-oriented governments." In February 1967, Guyana would begin a Stand-By Arrangement with the International Monetary Fund (IMF). Such arrangements would continue, off-and-on until 1979.

Another challenge to the newly independent government came at the beginning of January 1969, with the Rupununi Uprising. In the Rupununi region in southwest Guyana, along the Venezuelan border, white settlers and Amerindians rebelled against the central government. Several Guyanese policemen in the area were killed, and spokesmen for the rebels declared the area independent and asked for Venezuelan aid. Troops arrived from Georgetown within days, and the rebellion was quickly put down, with those remaining fleeing to Venezuela, which refused to provide military aid to the rebels. After the uprising, Venezuela President Rafael Caldera and Burnham were alarmed at the uprising and vowed to focus their attentions on the issue of the territorial dispute between their two countries. Their concern led to the Port of Spain Protocol in 1970. In 2019, the office of Guyanese President David Granger would describe the rebellion as consisting of "a few related cattle-owning families...[on] huge haciendas" rather than Indigenous people.

=== The cooperative republic ===
Co-operative Republic of Guyana
- 1970–1980
- Flag Coat of arms

- Capital and largest city: Georgetown
- History
  - Established: 1970
  - Disestablished: 1980
- ISO 3166 code: GY
| Preceded by | Succeeded by |
| Guyana | Guyana |

The 1968 elections allowed the PNC to rule without The United Force (UF). The PNC won thirty seats, the PPP nineteen seats, and the UF four seats. However, many observers claimed the elections were marred by manipulation and coercion by the PNC. The PPP and UF were part of Guyana's political landscape but were ignored as Burnham began to convert the machinery of state into an instrument of the PNC. However, an investigation of voting lists compiled by Guyanese diplomats in Britain and America "uncovered scores of invented names and fake addresses", with Peter D'Aguiar, leader of UF, calling the election result "a seizure of power by fraud, not an election."

After the 1968 elections, Burnham's policies, despite a continued CIA subsidy, became more leftist as he announced he would lead Guyana to socialism. He consolidated his dominance of domestic policies through gerrymandering, manipulation of the balloting process, and politicalisation of the civil service. A few Indo-Guyanese were co-opted into the PNC, but the ruling party was unquestionably the embodiment of the Afro-Guyanese political will. Although the Afro-Guyanese middle class was uneasy with Burnham's leftist leanings, the PNC remained a shield against Indo-Guyanese dominance. The support of the Afro-Guyanese community allowed the PNC to bring the economy under control and to begin organising the country into cooperatives.

On 23 February 1970 Guyana declared itself a "cooperative republic" and cut all ties to the British monarchy. The governor general was replaced as head of state by a ceremonial president. Relations with Cuba were improved, and Guyana became a force in the Nonaligned Movement. In August 1972, Burnham hosted the Conference of Foreign Ministers of Nonaligned Countries in Georgetown. He used this opportunity to address the evils of imperialism and the need to support liberation movements in southern Africa. Burnham also let Cuban troops use Guyana as a transit point on their way to the war in Angola in the mid-1970s and established diplomatic relations with the People's Republic of China in June 1972. Others argued that he became a "dictatorial figure" and that, by this point, he had "adopted the very politics the United States had sought to fend off."

In the early 1970s, electoral fraud became blatant in Guyana. PNC victories always included overseas voters, who consistently and overwhelmingly voted for the ruling party. The police and military intimidated the Indo-Guyanese. The army was accused of tampering with ballot boxes. Some scholars have noted that opposition, at the time, to the Guyanese government was multiracial. Also, it was said that in 1973, the overseas vote was "padded" while real people were disenfranchised, even recognised by U.S. Embassy officials.

Considered a low point in the democratic process, the 1973 elections were followed by an amendment to the constitution that abolished legal appeals to the Privy Council in London. After consolidating power on the legal and electoral fronts, Burnham turned to mobilising the masses for what was to be Guyana's cultural revolution. A program of national service was introduced that placed an emphasis on self-reliance, loosely defined as Guyana's population feeding, clothing, and housing itself without outside help. The country also joined CARICOM in August 1973.

Government authoritarianism increased in 1974 when Burnham issued the Declaration of Sophia where he stated that "the Party should assume unapologetically its paramountcy over the Government which is merely one of its executive arms." All organs of the state would be considered agencies of the ruling PNC and subject to its control. The state and the PNC became interchangeable; PNC objectives were now public policy. The Declaration also called for a transition to a socialist state, and a nationalisation of its economy. However, despite this "nationalistic, leftist-oriented economic policy", which included the bauxitemining industry being nationalised, the U.S. remained a backer of the government.

Burnham's consolidation of power in Guyana was not total; opposition groups were tolerated within limits. For instance, in 1973 the Working People's Alliance (WPA) was founded. Opposed to Burnham's authoritarianism, the WPA was a multi-ethnic combination of politicians and intellectuals that advocated racial harmony, free elections, and democratic socialism. Although the WPA did not become an official political party until 1979, it evolved as an alternative to Burnham's PNC and Jagan's PPP.

Jagan's political career continued to decline in the 1970s. Outmanoeuvred on the parliamentary front, the PPP leader tried another tactic. In April 1975, the PPP ended its boycott of parliament with Jagan stating that the PPP's policy would change from noncooperation and civil resistance to critical support of the Burnham regime. Soon after, Jagan appeared on the same platform with Prime Minister Burnham at the celebration of ten years of Guyanese independence, on 26 May 1976. The following year, workers in the Guyanese sugar industry would strike "135 days for economic justice", ending their action on 5 January 1978. Despite Jagan's conciliatory move, Burnham had no intention of sharing powers and continued to secure his position.

The PNC postponed the 1978 elections, opting instead for a referendum to be held in July 1978. proposing to keep the incumbent assembly in power. The July 1978 national referendum was poorly received. Although the PNC government proudly proclaimed that 71% of eligible voters participated and that 97% approved the referendum, other estimates put turnout at 10% to 14%. The low turnout was caused in large part by a boycott led by the PPP, WPA, and other opposition forces. Later, then-Grenadian Prime Minister Maurice Bishop, in a speech to his supporters, would argue that U.S. efforts in Guyana, in the 1970s, were a form of "destabilisation".

==== Jonestown and the 1978 massacre ====
Peoples Temple Agricultural Project "Jonestown"

Burnham's control over Guyana began to weaken when the Jonestown massacre brought unwanted international attention. In the late 1970s, Jim Jones, leader of the People's Temple of Christ, moved more than 1,000 of his followers from San Francisco to form Jonestown. It was a utopian agricultural community near Port Kaituma in western Guyana. The People's Temple of Christ was regarded by members of the Guyanese government as a model agricultural community that shared its vision of settling the hinterland and its view of cooperative socialism. The fact that the People's Temple was well equipped with openly flaunted weapons hinted that the community had the approval of members of the PNC's inner circle.

Complaints of abuse by leaders of the cult prompted United States congressman Leo Ryan to fly to Guyana to investigate the matter. The San Francisco-area representative was shot and killed by members of the People's Temple as he was boarding an airplane in Port Kaituma to return to Georgetown. Fearing further publicity, Jones and more than 900 of his followers died in a massive communal murder and suicide.

The November 1978 Jonestown massacre suddenly put the Burnham government under intense foreign scrutiny, especially from the United States. Investigations into the massacre led to allegations that the Guyanese government had links to the People's Temple. Originally, the U.S. government wanted to bury the bodies from the massacre in a mass grave, but the Guyanese government insisted they be removed, with Jonestown Memorial Fund member Rebecca Moore arguing it was "an U.S. problem dumped in their laps".

=== Burnham's last years ===
Although the bloody memory of Jonestown faded, Guyanese politics experienced a violent year in 1979. Some of this violence was directed against the WPA, which had emerged as a vocal critic of the state and of Burnham in particular. One of the party's leaders, Walter Rodney, and several professors at the University of Guyana were arrested on arson charges. The professors were soon released, and Rodney was granted bail. WPA leaders then organised the alliance into Guyana's most vocal opposition party. The events in Jonestown were also said to increase opposition to the government, with the "authoritarian nature" of the government said to cause "loss of both foreign and domestic supporters." Even so, the Guyanese government would begin an extended fund faculty with the International Monetary Fund (IMF), which would continue until July 1980. That aid would then be replaced by a similar financial instrument, which lasted to July 1982.

As 1979 wore on, the level of violence continued to escalate. In October Minister of Education Vincent Teekah was mysteriously shot to death. The following year, Rodney was killed by a car bomb. The PNC government quickly accused Rodney of being a terrorist who had died at the hands of his own bomb and charged his brother Donald with being an accomplice. Later investigation implicated the Guyanese government, however. Rodney was a well-known leftist, and the circumstances of his death damaged Burnham's image with many leaders and intellectuals in less-developed countries who earlier had been willing to overlook the authoritarian nature of his government. Although Burham's government was backed by the U.S., privately, diplomats were sceptical, and believed that the Guyanese authorities had "covered up evidence" in Rodney's assassination. Even so, the U.S. continued to support the country's economy as part of their "Cold War policy in the Caribbean and Central and South America." A commission on his death was later convened by the PPP government in 2014.

A new constitution was promulgated in 1980. The old ceremonial post of president was abolished, and the head of government became the executive president, chosen, as the former position of Prime Minister had been, by the majority party in the National Assembly. Burnham automatically became Guyana's first executive president and promised elections later in the year. In elections held on 15 December 1980, the PNC claimed 77% of the vote and forty-one seats of the popularly elected seats, plus the ten chosen by the regional councils. The PPP and UF won ten and two seats, respectively. The WPA refused to participate in an electoral contest it regarded as fraudulent. Opposition claims of electoral fraud were upheld by a team of international observers headed by Britain's Lord Avebury.

The economic crisis facing Guyana in the early 1980s deepened considerably, accompanied by the rapid deterioration of public services, infrastructure, and overall quality of life. The country became "one of the poorest" in the region. Blackouts occurred almost daily, and water services were increasingly unsatisfactory. The litany of Guyana's decline included shortages of rice and sugar (both produced in the country), cooking oil, and kerosene. While the formal economy sank, the black market economy in Guyana thrived. Richard Dwyer, deputy chief of mission in Guyana described the country as "riddled by corruption" and said the Burnham government had politics which had become "increasingly unsavory." Later, U.S. ambassador George B. Roberts Jr. found Burham distasteful, but called Cheddi Jagan "still unacceptable" to the U.S.

In the 1980s, the "largely untouched forests" of Guyana were logged after the Burnham government implemented a structural adjustment programme following an agreement with the International Monetary Fund (IMF). In later years, the country would parcel out the country's rivers and forests to Brazilian and Asian logging and mining companies. Guyana historically has had environmental issues relating to tropical forests and forests under medium-to-high threat from deforestation.

In 1983, Burnham urged U.S. President Ronald Reagan to limit operations in Grenada to evacuation of U.S. citizens, rather than a full-scale invasion. In the midst of this turbulent period, Burnham underwent surgery for a throat ailment. On 6 August 1985, while in the care of Cuban doctors, Guyana's first and only leader since independence unexpectedly died of heart failure. In 2020, National Security Archive experts John Prados and Arturo Jimenez-Bacardi argued that Burnham, who had been put in place thanks to a CIA covert operation, was "corrupt, arbitrary, and self-dealing".

== Hoyte to present ==
=== Hoyte and economic liberalisation ===
Despite concerns that the country was about to fall into a period of political instability, the transfer of power went smoothly. Vice President Desmond Hoyte became the new executive president and leader of the PNC. His initial tasks were threefold: to secure authority within the PNC and national government, to take the PNC through the December 1985 elections, and to revitalise the stagnant economy. The State Department would later stated that the Guyanese government sought to improve diplomatic relations with the U.S., coupled with a shift "toward political nonalignment" and away from "state socialism and one-party control" to expanded freedom of assembly and press and a market economy. In 1986, his government would submit a letter of intent to the IMF and World Bank, indicating commitment and willingness to economic policy reform.

Hoyte's first two goals were easily accomplished. The new leader took advantage of factionalism within the PNC to quietly consolidate his authority. The December 1985 elections gave the PNC 79% of the vote and 42/53 directly elected seats. Eight of the remaining eleven seats went to the PPP, two went to the UF, and one to the WPA. Charging fraud, the opposition boycotted the December 1986 municipal elections. With no opponents, the PNC won all ninety-one seats in local government.

Revitalising the economy proved more difficult. As a first step, Hoyte gradually moved to embrace the private sector, which would manifest in "significant privatisation" in many economic sectors by the 1990s. Hoyte's administration lifted all curbs on foreign activity and ownership in 1988. Although the Hoyte government did not completely abandon the authoritarianism of the Burnham regime, it did make certain political reforms. Hoyte abolished overseas voting and the provisions for widespread proxy and postal voting. Independent newspapers were given greater freedom, and political harassment abated considerably. A law passed in 1991, later amended in 1995, allowing individuals to "establish business enterprises", and dispose, or acquire or interest. The Hayte government would also renew aid arrangements with the IMF. From July 1990 to December 1991, the country would have a IMF Stand-By Arrangement, in conjunction with an Extended Credit Facility which lasted until December 1993. As one scholar, noting Canadian involvement in the country's economy, put it, "to say that structural adjustment was harsh would be an understatement".

=== Jagan's years in power ===
Former U.S. President Jimmy Carter visited Guyana to lobby for the resumption of free elections. On 5 October 1992, a new National Assembly and regional councils were elected in the first Guyanese election since 1964 to be internationally recognised as free and fair. Cheddi Jagan of the PPP was elected and sworn in as president on 9 October 1992. This reversed the monopoly Afro-Guyanese traditionally had over Guyanese politics. The poll was marred by violence however.

Before Jagan took office, a new IMF Structural Adjustment programme was introduced which led to an increase in the GDP whilst also eroding real incomes and hitting the middle-classes hard. Jagan's government debated whether to continue to implement the IMF programme agreed to under the former administration, and decided to stick with the programme, while Jagan argued publicly that the working class of the country were harmed by these programmes. The country would join the World Trade Organization in 1995. The previous year, Guyana had joined the World Intellectual Property Organization. Guyana would also continue economic arrangements with the IMF. From July 1994 to April 1998, the country would have an Extended Credit Facility with the IMF, which continued, almost uninterrupted until September 2005.

When President Jagan died of a heart attack in March 1997, Prime Minister Sam Hinds replaced him in accordance with constitutional provisions, with his widow Janet Jagan as Prime Minister. She was then elected president on 15 December 1997 for the PPP. Desmond Hoyte's PNC contested the results however, resulting in strikes, riots and one death before a Caricom mediating committee was brought in. Janet Jagan's PPP government was sworn in on 24 December having agreed to a constitutional review and to hold elections within three years. However, Hoyte refused to recognise her government. Jagan later resigned in August 1999 due to ill health. She was succeeded by Finance Minister Bharrat Jagdeo, who had been named Prime Minister a day earlier. The same year, the Guyanese government secretly awarded a "ten-year petroleum prospecting licence" to Esso Exploration and Production Guyana Limited, a consortium which included Exxon as one of the oilfield operators, and would be awarded a licence years later.

=== The Jagdeo years ===
In 2000, Guyana would be described in The 21st Century World Atlas reference book as suffering from a "lack of basic structures and services", and "poorly developed" fishing, livestock, and forest resources, while praised for "great efforts [...] in the farming and industrial sectors". National elections were held on 19 March 2001, three months later than planned, as the election committees said they were unprepared. Fears that the violence that marred the previous election led to monitoring by foreign bodies, including U.S. President Jimmy Carter. In March incumbent President Jagdeo won the election with a voter turnout of over 90%. Meanwhile, tensions with Suriname were seriously strained by a dispute over their shared maritime border after Guyana had allowed oil-prospectors licence to explore the areas. The same year, a law passed allowing the government "expropriate property in the public interest", but in 2022 the U.S. State Department noted that there were "no recent cases of expropriation."

In December 2002, Desmond Hoyte died, with Robert Corbin replacing him as leader of the PNC. He agreed to engage in 'constructive engagement' with Jagdeo and the PPP. The same year, five escapees from a jail in Georgetown "embarked on a spree of murders, kidnappings, and robberies", calling themselves guerrilla fighters who were resisting the government. These massacres resulted in the emergency of a paramilitary unit known as the Phantom Squad, led by Shaheed "Roger" Khan, an Indo-Guyanese drug trafficker of cocaine, which engaged in many extrajudicial killings, primarily of Black criminals, which lasted six years, leading some to say the country had become a narco-state.

The PPP/C would win re-election in 2006. However, a political opposition party, Alliance for Change, formed by those who had defected from the PPP/C and the PNC, performed "surprisingly well", gaining it six seats in the country's parliament. Previously, scholars had argued that the country had suffered from violence and rioting during the election campaigns in 1996 and 2001.

During the 2005 Georgetown flood, 34 people were killed and many crops were destroyed; around 37% to 39% of the population was in some way impacted. In 2013, the Hope Canal was completed to address the flooding.

In May 2008, President Jagdeo was a signatory to the UNASUR Constitutive Treaty of the Union of South American Nations. On 12 February 2010, Guyana ratified its membership in the Union of South American Nations (UNASUR).

=== Coalitions, oil drilling, and political instability ===
In December 2011, President Bharrat Jagdeo was succeeded by Donald Ramotar of the governing People's Progressive Party (PPP/C). However, the ruling party, mainly supported by Guyana's ethnic-Indians, lost its parliamentary majority for the first time in 19 years.

Guyana began a contract with ExxonMobil for offshore oil drilling, to tap into "more than 10 billion barrels" in the country's territorial waters, in May 2015, earning the country millions in oil revenues for "development and climate adaptation." This has turned the country into an emerging oil producer while other countries are reducing their "reliance on oil, coal and natural gas" and Guyana itself is under "dire threat" from climate change. This "new oil wealth" has also led to maritime border disputes with neighbouring nations, regards to resources in Guyana's exclusive economic zone. ExxonMobil later stated that they were "firmly established" in the country, as the country's largest oil producer, with an office in Georgetwn, and numerous ongoing offshore "exploration and development operations offshore. In their overview, the World Bank would also note that the country had "large offshore oil and gas reserves", but was at "high risk of climate induced hazards". As noted by scholars in 2021, in the consortium engaged in offshore drilling, Exxon has 45% of the shares, Hess Corporation 30%, and the China National Offshore Oil Company has 25%.

In May 2015, David Granger of A Partnership for National Unity and Alliance for Change (APNU+AFC) narrowly won the elections. He represented the alliance of Afro-Guyanese parties, which had a slim parliamentary majority. Granger was later sworn is as the new President of Guyana. The following year, the country celebrated its 50 years of independence, with huge celebrations attended by Guyanese and Guyanese expatriates living in other countries.

In December 2018, the government had been defeated by a vote of no confidence in Granger, with new elections constitutionally required. However, the sitting government used various court challenges and tactics to give itself "another year in office" as a caretaker government.

=== Disputed elections, ethnic conflict, and territorial disputes ===
==== 2020 Election ====
In August 2020, the 75-year-old incumbent David Granger lost narrowly and he did not accept the result. Irfaan Ali of the People's Progressive Party/Civic was sworn in as the new president five months after the election because of allegations of fraud and irregularities. Writer Gaiutra Bahadur argued that the election was "racially driven", that the PNC led a "multiracial...majority-black coalition" aiming to unseat the PPP, and stated that there were persistent rumours before the vote took place. He also described the election as a "referendum on corruption" and a test of coalition politics" with various moments of "outright violence" and anxiety. Scholars Arif Bulkan and Alissa Trotz argued that the country's "internecine conflict" masks privation caused by "extractivist and predatory capitalist models of economic development" in the country. They noted that the Ali government, after coming to power, rushed to approve an environmental permit, opening another oil field for exploitation by Exxon.

In September 2020, after the election, the New York Times stated that the murder of three individuals plunged the country into "its worst racial unrest in years". This follows a long history of racial tension between Indo-Guyanese and Afro-Guyanese people, in a country composed of five primary ethnic groups: Indians, Africans, Amerindians, Europeans (mainly Portuguese), and Chinese.

In the September 2025 Guyanese general election, Ali was re-elected to the presidency for a second term.

==== Guayana Esequiba ====
Following the discovery of oil reserves in Guayana Esequiba in 2015, the territorial dispute over the region between Venezuela and Guyana escalated. In late 2023, a military buildup of Venezuelan forces on the border with Guayana Esequiba sparked a diplomatic crisis. On 3 December 2023, a non-binding referendum in Venezuela was held on the annexation of the territory into Venezuela. Despite low turnout, with an estimated 2.1 million participating, 95% voted to create a Guayana Esequiba state under Venezuelan control, and granting Venezuelan citizenship to the region's inhabitants and "implementing social programs" for those living there. Venezuelan President Nicolás Maduro described the referendum as a "moment for national unity" and said that Venezuela is "recovering the lands bequeathed to us by our independence heroes."

The referendum's questions were condemned by the Guyanese government, the Commonwealth of Nations Secretary-General Patricia Scotland, and Secretary General of the Organisation of American States (OAS), Luis Almagro. Also, the leadership of the Caribbean Community voiced support for Guyana, and Brazil increased its military presence along its northern border, in response to the escalating tensions in the region. Within Venezuela, the Episcopal Conference of Venezuela called for resolving the conflict between Guyana and Venezuela peacefully, and the Communist Party of Venezuela (PCV) described the referendum as the "old strategy of the bourgeoisie [that tries] to instill patriotic and chauvinist feelings in a good part of the population (...) making people believe that in our country there is no more important problem to solve". Some speculated that the dispute has "raised fears of U.S. intervention in the region" due to U.S. backing of the Guyanese government.

== See also ==
- British colonisation of the Americas
- French colonisation of the Americas
- History of the Americas
- History of the British West Indies
- History of South America
- History of the Caribbean
- Politics of Guyana
- List of governors of British Guiana
- List of governors-general of Guyana
- List of presidents of Guyana
- List of Prime Ministers of Guyana
- Spanish colonisation of the Americas
