= President of Guyana =

Head of state and government

President of the Co-operative Republic of Guyana
- Presidential emblem

- Current presidential standard

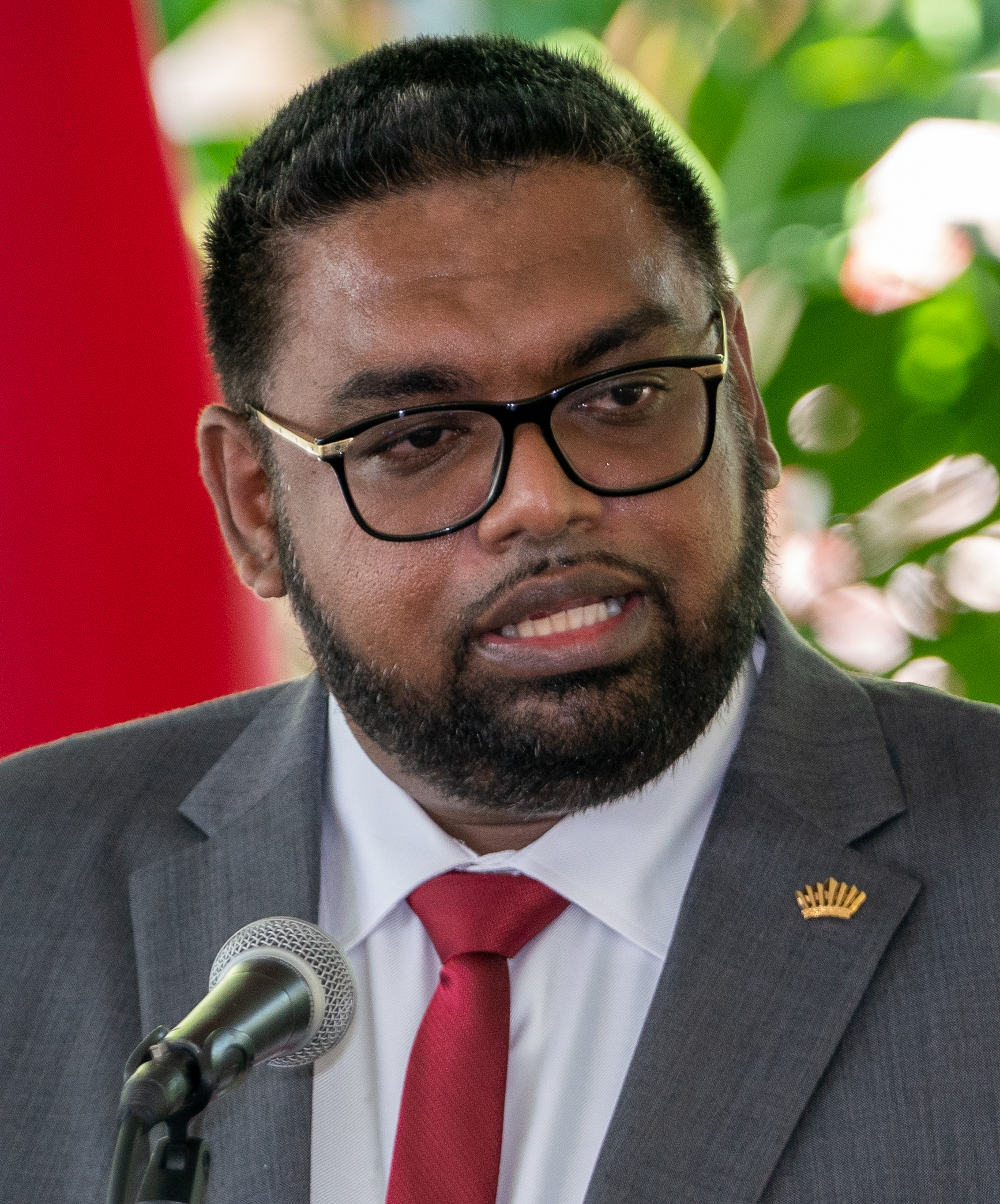
- Incumbent; Mohamed Irfaan Ali since 2 August 2020
- Style: His Excellency
- Status: Head of state Head of government
- Residence: State House, Georgetown
- Seat: Georgetown
- Term length: Five years, renewable once
- Constituting instrument: Constitution of Guyana (1980)
- Precursor: Queen of Guyana
- Inaugural holder: Arthur Chung
- Formation: March 17, 1970 (56 years ago)
- Succession: Prime Minister of Guyana (as First Vice President)
- Deputy: Vice Presidents of Guyana
- Website: https://motp.gov.gy/

The president of Guyana is the head of state and the head of government of Guyana, as well as the commander-in-chief of the armed forces of the Republic, according to the Constitution of Guyana. The president is also the chancellor of the Orders of Guyana. Concurrent with his constitutional role as commander-in-chief of the Armed Forces, the president does not appoint a separate minister of defence. That portfolio is held by the president who fulfils all responsibilities designated to a minister of defence under the Defence Act.

== History and description ==
When Guyana was declared a republic in 1970 the president was elected by the National Assembly for a five-year term and possessed largely ceremonial powers. President Arthur Chung was the only person to hold the office under those legal provisions. After a 1980 referendum, the constitution was amended to make the presidency an executive post (i.e. the office holder would be both the country's head of state and its head of government) and the office became known as the executive president. Forbes Burnham was the first person to become president following these changes.

== Election ==
According to Article 91 of the constitution, the president is elected by the people based on the votes cast in the parliamentary election (that is, using double simultaneous vote). Each list of contesting parties will on Nomination Day designate a member of their list as that party's presidential candidate. The presidential candidate whose party's list of candidates receives the most votes is deemed to be elected president and holds office for the legislature's duration — which is, in practice, five years. Since 2000, he has been limited to two terms, whether successive or separated.

If two or more candidates who have more votes cast for them than any other candidate receive an equal number of votes, then under Article 177(3) of the constitution, the president shall be determined by drawing lots in the presence of the chancellor of the Judiciary and the public. This process of drawing lots to determine the president has never occurred in the history of Guyana since the creation of the presidency.

== Qualification for election ==
To be qualified to be elected president, a candidate must:

- Be a citizen of Guyana by birth or parentage
- Have resided in Guyana for seven years before the date of the election
- Be qualified to be elected a member of the National Assembly, that is to say:
  - Be a citizen of Guyana 18 years and older
  - Be able to speak, and read the English language to an extent which would allow active participation in the proceedings of the National Assembly, unless an incapacity prevents this. In this case, this provision will not apply.

Concurrently, under article 155(1) of the constitution, and reinforced by a 2019 ruling of the Supreme Court of Judicature of Guyana, persons holding citizenship of Guyana and any other country (dual citizens) are not allowed to be members of the National Assembly, and consequently would not be eligible to be president.

== Oath of office ==
Before entering into office, the person who has been elected or re-elected President must take and sign the following oath of office, the wording of which is specified in the First Schedule to the Constitution:

"I (name) do hereby solemnly declare that I will bear true faith and allegiance to the People of Guyana that I will faithfully execute the office of President of the Co-operative Republic of Guyana without fear or favour, affection or ill-will and that in the execution of the functions of that office I will honour, uphold, and preserve the Constitution of the Co-operative Republic of Guyana."

The phrase 'so help me God' is not specified in the constitution, but may be added at the end of the oath on the personal discretion of the president.

== Absence and vacancy of the office ==
Whenever the president is out of Guyana or is absent from Guyana by reason of illness the prime minister, or - if the prime minister is already out of Guyana at the same time - any other minister designated by the president shall assume the office as acting president until the president is able to resume office.

The constitution also makes provision for a scenario where a president is too ill to transmit the above instructions. In the event this occurs, the temporary succession would proceed; however, the person acting as president is prevented from dissolving the National Assembly without the advice of the Cabinet, and may not revoke presidential appointments. The person acting as president will cease to do so when the permanent president informs them that they are well and able to resume office.

The office of president only becomes vacant in the following circumstances:

- If the holder of the office dies
- If the holder of the office resigns via a letter under their hand and addressed to the Speaker of the National Assembly
- If the holder of the office is removed for incapacity (under article 179 of the constitution)
- If the holder of the office is removed for violating the constitution or gross misconduct (under article 180 of the constitution)

Where a vacancy in the office exists in the above circumstances, the prime minister becomes the new substantive president rather than being an acting president.

== Order of succession ==
If there is a vacancy in the office of president, Article 95(1) of the constitution makes provision for a 'worst-case scenario' accounting for multiple levels of vacancy and specifies that the order of succession to the presidency shall be:

- The prime minister

(or if there is no prime minister)

- Any minister who is an elected member of the National Assembly as determined by the Cabinet

(or if there is no prime minister and no Cabinet)

- The chancellor of the judiciary

== Symbols of office ==
=== Cacique's Crown ===
The Cacique's Crown is the personal emblem of the president of the Republic. Designated as such in 1970 when Guyana became a republic, the Cacique's Crown has been consistently used by all presidents. It is commonly seen on stationery, the presidential vehicle, at the president's office, and the State House – the president's official residence. While the Cacique's Crown used by the president and on items connected to the president may have slight artistic variations, it always consists of a design containing seven feathers and is often coloured in solid gold or in different shades of gold to show relief. Use of the Cacique's Crown in an unauthorized manner is restricted. The Cacique's Crown is also the main feature of the crest of the coat of arms of Guyana.

Cacique's Crown	Presidential vehicle plate

=== Arms of the president ===
The arms of the president was adopted by proclamation on 23 February 1970 when Guyana became a republic. It consists of the shield from the coat of arms of Guyana containing a green inescutcheon bearing a Cacique's Crown in full colour. The overall shield design is surmounted by a predominantly gold coloured Cacique's Crown.

The arms of the president is rarely seen in use. Successive presidents have used the Cacique's Crown more frequently and consistently than the arms of the president. During the David Granger presidency (2015-2020), the arms of the president was used more frequently when it formed the main charge of his presidential standard.

Arms of the President

== Independence constitution ==
Independent Guyana's first constitution, a modified version of the 1961 constitution, took effect on the first day of independence, May 26, 1966. It reaffirmed the principle that Guyana was a democratic state founded on the rule of law. The titular head of state was Elizabeth II, in her capacity as Queen of Guyana, represented by the Governor-General, whose position was largely ceremonial. Real executive power rested in the Prime Minister, appointed by the majority party in the renamed National Assembly, and his ministers. The first post-independence elections in 1968 confirmed the dominant role of the PNC and its leader, Forbes Burnham. On February 23, 1970, the Burnham government proclaimed the Cooperative Republic of Guyana. This move had both economic and political ramifications. The government argued that the country's many resources had been controlled by foreign capitalists and that organizing the population into cooperatives would provide the best path to development.

The 1970 proclamation severed Guyana's last significant constitutional tie to Britain. The governor general, heretofore the ceremonial head of state, was replaced by a Guyanese, was the country's first president.

Although its ties to the British monarch were broken, Guyana remained within the Commonwealth of Nations. Membership in the Commonwealth allowed Guyana to reap the benefits of access to markets in Britain and to retain some of the defence arrangements that Britain offered its former colonies. In particular, the British defence umbrella was seen as a deterrent to Venezuelan claims on Guyanese territory.

In 1978 a constitutional referendum was held. The proposed change to Article 73 of the constitution would abolish the need for referendums to change the entrenched provisions of the constitution (including presidential powers, the dissolution of Parliament and the electoral system) and instead allow them to be changed by a two-thirds majority in Parliament (which the PNC had at the time). It would also result in the postponement of the elections scheduled for later in the year, and instead the Parliament elected in 1973 would be declared a Constituent Assembly.

== See also ==
- List of Commonwealth heads of government
- List of governors of British Guiana
- List of heads of state of Guyana
- Vice President of Guyana
- List of prime ministers of Guyana
