= Prime Minister of Guyana =

Political position in Guyana

Prime Minister of the Co-operative Republic of Guyana
- Seal of the Office of the Prime Minister of Guyana

- Flag of Guyana

- Incumbent; Mark Phillips since 2 August 2020
- Cabinet of Guyana
- Style: The Honourable
- Residence: Prime Minister's Residence, Main Street, Georgetown
- Appointer: President of Guyana
- Term length: 5 years, renewable
- Formation: 26 May 1966
- First holder: Forbes Burnham
- Succession: Any Minister of Government as designated by the President

The prime minister of the Co-operative Republic of Guyana is an elected member of the National Assembly of Guyana who is the principal assistant and advisor to the president as well as the leader of government business in the National Assembly, but is not the head of government in Guyana. The prime minister assumes the office of president if the presidency becomes vacant.

== Background ==
The office of Prime Minister of Guyana was established in 1966 upon Guyana becoming independent. The office is the direct successor to that of the Premier and Chief Minister of British Guiana. In 1964, the last elections in British Guiana were held. With the next elections slated to occur after independence, the Premier of British Guiana automatically became Prime Minister of Guyana on Independence Day.

From 1966 to 1980 the prime minister was the head of government, exercising executive power and general direction and control of the government. During this time the country's head of state was Elizabeth II (represented by a governor-general) from 1966 to 1970, and then a ceremonial president from 1970 to 1980 after Guyana became a republic.

The 1980 constitution abolished the ceremonial presidency and created an executive president who became head of state and head of government. Under the constitution, the prime minister before the commencement of the constitution became the president with full executive powers. The office of prime minister was retained and now included the permanent subsidiary office of First Vice-president to further highlight the constitutional role of the prime minister as the president's successor. However the powers and influence of the office and individual prime ministers have varied depending on the responsibilities delegated by the president.

== Appointment and responsibilities ==
The prime minister is appointed by the president from among the elected members of the National Assembly of Guyana. As a result of the political structure of the government of Guyana where an election for the members of the National Assembly concurrently serves as an election of the president, the prime minister is always drawn from the party or coalition the president belongs to. Despite it being the practice of almost all political parties or coalitions to designate a presidential and prime ministerial candidate in the event they secure the most votes over any other parties or coalitions in the election, only a presidential candidate is legally required to be designated in advance of the election.

The selection, appointment, and removal of the prime minister is therefore constitutionally at the discretion of the president; however, only a member of the National Assembly who is eligible to become president may be appointed prime minister. This ensures that the requirements for a person to become president are met in case circumstances result in the prime minister having to accede to the office.

Under Article 101 of the Constitution of Guyana, the prime minister is described as the president's principal assistant in the discharge of the functions of the president. The responsibilities of the prime minister include:

- Serving as acting president whenever the president is temporarily absent or unable to discharge the functions of the office.
- Acceding to the presidency in the event of the death, removal, or resignation of a president.
- Chairing the meetings of the Cabinet in the absence of the president.
- Serving as the Leader of Government Business in the National Assembly (this is a legislative role and not akin to being Head of Government).
- Heading the office of the prime minister and having oversight of the subordinate agencies of that office.
- Serving as the subject Minister of any additional ministerial portfolios designated by the President.

The Constitution also mandates that the prime minister – being first vice-president – has precedence over any additional vice president(s).

== Oath of office ==
Prior to the appointment of a prime minister, the president will issue an ‘Instrument Appointing a Prime Minister’ under the Seal of Guyana which sets out the name of the person to be appointed, and the section of the constitution utilized to make the appointment.

The prime minister-designate then takes the following oath of office of the form specified in the Schedule to the Constitution of Guyana:

I (name) do hereby solemnly declare that I will bear true faith and allegiance to the People of Guyana and that I will faithfully execute the office of Prime Minister of the Co-operative Republic of Guyana without fear or favour, affection or ill-will and that in the execution of the functions of that office, I will honour, uphold, and preserve the Constitution of the Co-operative Republic of Guyana.

The phrase 'so help me God' is not specified in the constitution, but may be added at the end of the oath on the personal discretion of the prime minister.

The oath is then signed by the prime minister and countersigned by the president, after which, the instrument of appointment is handed over to the prime minister.

== Symbols of office ==
There are no distinctive symbols of the office of prime minister as the coat of arms of Guyana is used. The prime minister is one of only two officials in Guyana – the other being the president – who do not use regular vehicle plates. The vehicle containing the prime minister displays a gold image of the coat of arms of Guyana.

== List of prime ministers ==
This is a list of the prime ministers of Guyana, from the establishment of the office of Chief Minister of British Guiana in 1953 to the present day. After the creation of the vice presidency in 1980, the title became the Prime Minister and First Vice President of Guyana.

Political parties

People's National Congress Reform (PNCR)
People's Progressive Party/Civic (PPP/C)
Alliance for Change (Guyana) (AFC)

Other affiliations

Independent

=== Chief minister of British Guiana ===
No.	Portrait	Name (Birth–Death)	Term of office			Political party	Monarch(s)	Ref.
No.	Portrait	Name (Birth–Death)	Took office	Left office	Time in office	Political party	Monarch(s)	Ref.
1		Cheddi Jagan (1918–1997)	30 May 1953	9 October 1953	132 days	PPP/C	Elizabeth II	
(1)		Cheddi Jagan (1918–1997)	21 August 1957	5 September 1961	3 years, 261 days	PPP/C	Elizabeth II	

=== Premiers of British Guiana ===
No.	Portrait	Name (Birth–Death)	Term of office			Political party	Monarch(s)	Ref.
No.	Portrait	Name (Birth–Death)	Took office	Left office	Time in office	Political party	Monarch(s)	Ref.
1		Cheddi Jagan (1918–1997)	5 September 1961	12 December 1964	3 years, 98 days	PPP/C	Elizabeth II	
2		Forbes Burnham (1923–1985)	12 December 1964	26 May 1966	1 year, 165 days	PNCR	Elizabeth II	

=== Prime ministers of Guyana ===
No.	Portrait	Name (Birth–Death)	Term of office			Political party	Head(s) of state	Ref.
No.	Portrait	Name (Birth–Death)	Took office	Left office	Time in office	Political party	Head(s) of state	Ref.
Guyana (Commonwealth realm)
1		Forbes Burnham (1923–1985)	26 May 1966	23 February 1970	3 years, 273 days	PNCR	Elizabeth II	
Co-operative Republic of Guyana
(1)		Forbes Burnham (1923–1985)	23 February 1970	6 October 1980	10 years, 226 days	PNCR	Luckhoo; Chung	
2		Ptolemy Reid (1918–2003)	6 October 1980	16 August 1984	3 years, 315 days	PNCR	Burnham	
3		Desmond Hoyte (1929–2002)	16 August 1984	6 August 1985	355 days	PNCR	Burnham	
4		Hamilton Green (born 1934)	6 August 1985	9 October 1992	7 years, 64 days	PNCR	Hoyte	
5		Sam Hinds (born 1943)	9 October 1992	17 March 1997	4 years, 159 days	PPP/C	C. Jagan; Himself	
6		Janet Jagan (1920–2009)	17 March 1997	19 December 1997	277 days	PPP/C	Hinds	
(5)		Sam Hinds (born 1943)	19 December 1997	9 August 1999	1 year, 233 days	PPP/C	J. Jagan	
7		Bharrat Jagdeo (born 1964)	9 August 1999	11 August 1999	2 days	PPP/C	J. Jagan	
(5)		Sam Hinds (born 1943)	11 August 1999	20 May 2015	15 years, 282 days	PPP/C	Jagdeo; Ramotar	
8		Moses Nagamootoo (born 1947)	20 May 2015	2 August 2020	5 years, 74 days	AFC (APNU)	Granger	
9		Mark Phillips (born 1961)	2 August 2020	Incumbent	6 years, 67 days	PPP/C	Ali	

== See also ==
- List of prime ministers of Elizabeth II
- List of governors of British Guiana
- List of heads of state of Guyana
- President of Guyana
- Vice President of Guyana
- List of Privy Counsellors (1952–2022)

== Bibliography ==
- Constitution (2012). "CONSTITUTION OF THE CO-OPERATIVE REPUBLIC OF GUYANA ACT" (PDF). Parliament of Guyana.
