= First Lady of Guyana =

Title held by wife of president of Guyana

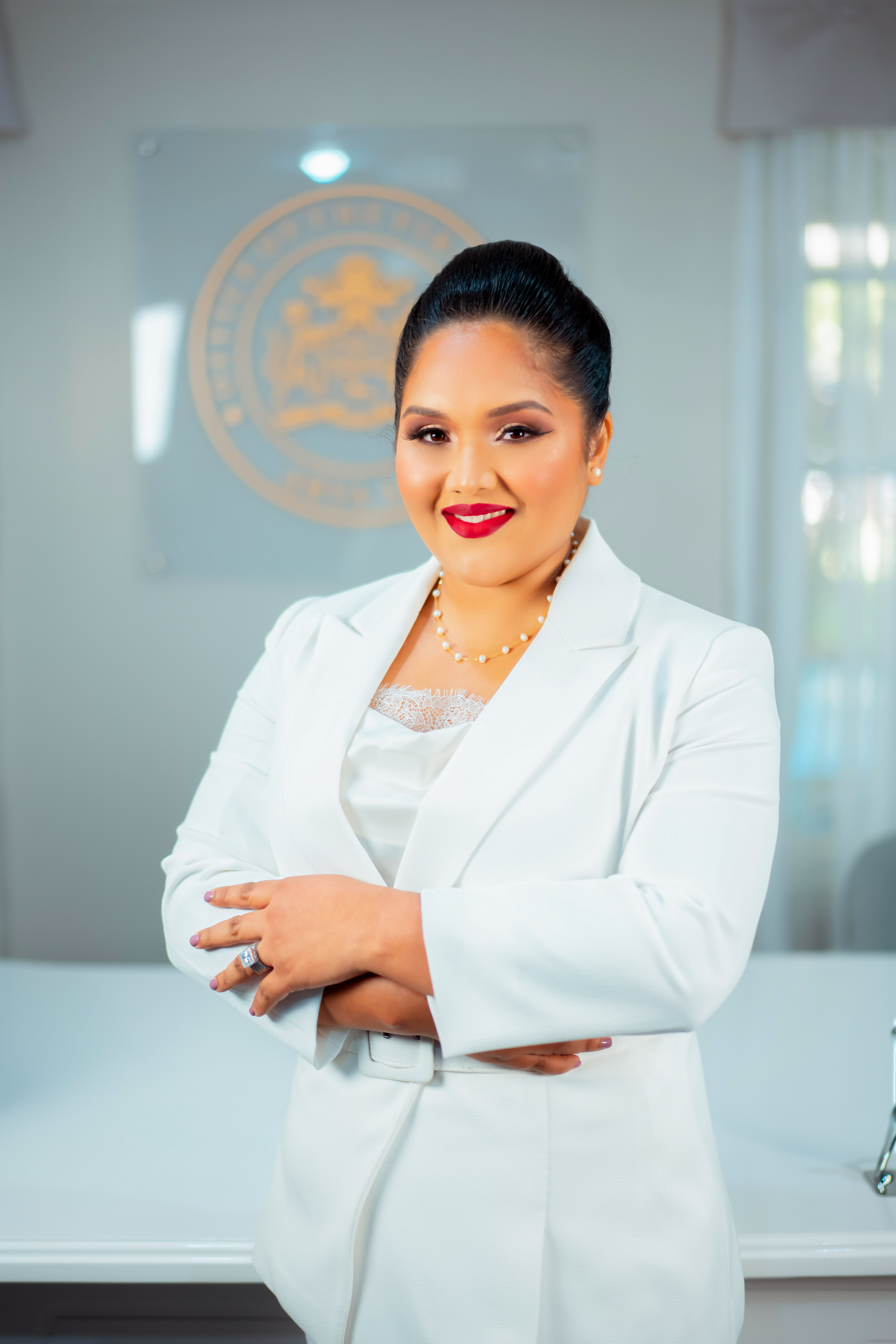
- Incumbent; Arya Ali since August 2, 2020
- Residence: State House, Georgetown, Guyana
- Inaugural holder: Doreen Chung
- Formation: March 17, 1970

First Lady of Guyana is the title held by the wife of the president of Guyana. The current first lady of Guyana is Arya Ali, wife of President Irfaan Ali, who has served in the position since August 2020.

== First ladies and gentlemen of Guyana ==
Name	Term begins	Term ends	President of Guyana	Notes
Doreen Chung	17 March 1970	6 October 1980	Arthur Chung	
Viola Burnham ♦	6 October 1980	6 August 1985	Forbes Burnham	
Joyce Hoyte	6 August 1985	9 October 1992	Desmond Hoyte	
Janet Jagan	9 October 1992	6 March 1997	Cheddi Jagan	Janet Jagan served as the 6th President of Guyana from 1997 to 1999
Yvonne Hinds	6 March 1997	19 December 1997	Sam Hinds	
Widowed	19 December 1997	11 August 1999	Janet Jagan	
Varshni Jagdeo	11 August 1999	2007 (Divorced)	Bharrat Jagdeo	
Office vacant	2007	3 December 2011	Bharrat Jagdeo	
Deolatchmee Ramotar	3 December 2011	16 May 2015	Donald Ramotar	
Sandra Granger	16 May 2015	2 August 2020	David Granger	
Arya Ali	2 August 2020	Present	Irfaan Ali	

♦ Viola Burnham later served as Vice President of Guyana and deputy prime minister from 1985 to 1991.

== See also ==
- Presidents of Guyana
