= Ptolemy Reid =

2nd Prime Minister of Guyana
- In office 6 October 1980 – 16 August 1984
- President: Forbes Burnham
- Preceded by: Forbes Burnham
- Succeeded by: Desmond Hoyte

1st Vice President of Guyana
- In office 6 October 1980 – 16 August 1984; Served with Shiw Sahai Naraine, Hugh Desmond Hoyte, Hamilton Green and Bishwaishwar Ramsaroop
- President: Forbes Burnham
- Preceded by: Forbes Burnham
- Succeeded by: Desmond Hoyte

Personal details
- Born: 8 May 1918 Dartmouth, British Guiana
- Died: 2 September 2003 (aged 85) East Coast Demerara, Guyana
- Party: People's National Congress
- Education: Tuskegee University

Ptolemy Alexander Reid (May 8, 1918 – September 2, 2003) was a Guyanese veterinarian and politician who served as Prime Minister of Guyana from 1980 to 1984.

== Early life ==
He was born in Dartmouth, British Guiana attending the village primary school where he eventually became a teacher before entering the Cyril Potter College of Education (known at the time as the Teachers' Training College).

Reid studied veterinary medicine at the Tuskegee Institute in Alabama, then returned to Guyana in 1955, and married Ruth Chalmers. Unable to find employment in British Guiana, he moved to England where he became a member of the Royal College of Veterinary Surgeons, and then practiced in the Canadian province of Saskatchewan. He returned to Guyana in 1958 and took on a position at Bookers Sugar Estate as the Chief Veterinary Officer, and became involved in politics in 1960 when he joined the People's National Congress.

== Political career ==
He ran for office in 1961, hoping to represent the constituency of Pomeroon-Supenaam, but was unsuccessful.

When Forbes Burnham took power in 1964, Reid became a member of Burnham's cabinet, where he served as Deputy Premier and minister of home affairs (1964-1966), finance minister (1967–1970); minister of agriculture (1970-1972); and minister of agriculture and national development (1972–1974). In 1980, when Burnham resigned as prime minister to become president, Reid took his place.

He retired in 1984, taking up farming in East Bank Demerara. His wife died in 1997, and he remarried Marjorie Griffith. She died in May 2003, and Reid himself followed on 2 September 2003, aged 91.

== Recognition ==
- Order of Excellence
- Order of Gran Cruz (Colombia)
- Distinguished Alumni Award from the Tuskegee University

Political offices
| Preceded by Forbes Burnham | Prime Minister of Guyana; 1980 – 1984 | Succeeded by Desmond Hoyte |
