= Freedom House (disambiguation) =

Freedom House is a think tank based in Washington, D.C., United States.

Freedom House may also refer to:

- Freedom House (Roxbury, Massachusetts), community organization
- Freedom House Ambulance Service, the first emergency medical technician service in America, founded in 1967
- Freedom House bombing, a bomb explosion in July 1964 at the headquarters of the People's Progressive Party, Georgetown, then British Guiana.
- Freedom House Museum, also known as the Franklin and Armfield Office, anti-slavery museum in Alexandria, Virginia, United States
- House of Freedom, an administration building on the South Korea side of the Joint Security Area between North and South Korea

== See also ==
- Liberty House (disambiguation)
