= Ramsaroop =

Ramsaroop is a surname. Notable people with the surname include:

- Bishwaishwar Ramsaroop (1939–2021), Guyanese politician
- Mishkal Ramsaroop (born 1993), South African cricketer
- Peter Ramsaroop (born 1962), Guyanese entrepreneur, author, and politician
