= List of ambassadors of Guyana to the United States =

Coordinates: 38°55′1″N 77°3′20.7″W

Ambassador of Guyana to the United States Embassy of Guyana in Washington, D.C.
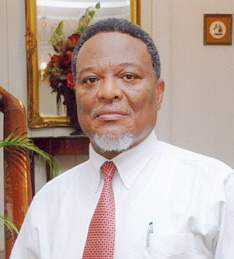
- Incumbent; Sam Hinds since July 7, 2021
- Inaugural holder: John Carter (ambassador)
- Formation: July 18, 1966

The Guyanese ambassador in Washington, D. C. is the official representative of the Government in Georgetown, Guyana to the Government of the United States and is regularly accredited as Permanent Representative to the Organization of American States.

== List of representatives ==
Diplomatic agrément	Diplomatic accreditation	Ambassador	Observations	List of heads of state of Guyana	List of presidents of the United States	Term end
June 28, 1966	July 18, 1966	John Carter (ambassador)		Richard Luyt	Lyndon B. Johnson	
May 25, 1970	June 11, 1970	Rahman Baccus Gajraj		Arthur Chung	Richard Nixon	
January 15, 1973	March 2, 1973	Frederick Hilborn Talbot		Arthur Chung	Richard Nixon	
August 25, 1975		Paul Mittelholzer	Chargé d'affaires	Arthur Chung	Gerald Ford	
September 26, 1975	November 21, 1975	Laurence Everil Mann		Arthur Chung	Gerald Ford	
October 14, 1981		Leslie Robinson	Chargé d'affaires	Forbes Burnham	Ronald Reagan	
January 19, 1982	February 5, 1982	Cedric Eilburn Grant		Forbes Burnham	Ronald Reagan	
July 15, 1993	September 3, 1993	Odeen Ishmael		Cheddi Jagan	Bill Clinton	
November 26, 2003	December 4, 2003	Bayney Ram Karran		Bharrat Jagdeo	George W. Bush	
September 1, 2016	September 16, 2016	Riyad Insanally		David A. Granger	Barack Obama	
July 1, 2021	July 7, 2021	Sam Hinds		Irfaan Ali	Joe Biden	
