= Chinese Guyanese =

Ethnic group in Guyana

Chinese Guyanese people
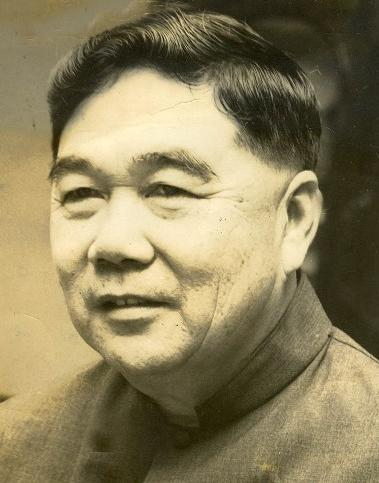
- Arthur Chung, first president of Guyana

Total population
- 1,637 (0.18% of total pop.)

Regions with significant populations
- Georgetown and Enterprise

Languages
- Chinese and English (Guyanese Creole)

Religion
- Roman Catholicism, Anglicanism, Evangelical Christianity, Buddhism, and Chinese folk religion including (Taoism and Confucianism)

Related ethnic groups
- Chinese Caribbean

Chinese Guyanese are Guyanese nationals of Han Chinese descent. The first numbers of Chinese arrived in British Guiana in 1853, forming an important minority of the indentured workforce. After their indenture, many who stayed on in Guyana came to be known as successful retailers, with considerable integration with the local culture. The most notable person of Chinese ancestry was Arthur Chung, former president of Guyana, who was independent Guyana's first president from 1970 to 1980, and the first Chinese head of state of a non-Asian country.

== History ==
Fourteen thousand Chinese arrived in British Guiana between 1853 and 1879 on 39 vessels bound from Hong Kong by the British Raj officials to fill the labor shortage on the sugar plantations engendered by the abolition of slavery. Smaller numbers arrived in other British colonies such as Jamaica, Trinidad and Tobago and Suriname. The Chinese achieved considerable success in the colony, a number of them having been Christians in China before the emigration. Some, particularly in the early years, were "the offscourings of Canton--goal-birds, loafers and vagabonds," who swiftly deserted the plantations and took to bootlegging, burglary and robbery and kept brothels and gambling houses. Others were fleeing the Punti-Hakka Clan Wars conflicts of Canton. Most were bound under five-year indentures—civil contracts enforced by penal sanctions—to work on the sugar plantations.

Eighty-five percent of these Chinese immigrants were men staying at Guyana, and most returned to China or emigrated to other parts of the Guianas and the Caribbean after completing or escaping their indentures. Those who remained soon turned to trade, competing effectively with the Portuguese and Indo, who had also entered as indentured laborers, in the retail sector. Look-Lai reports important Chinese import and wholesale traders by the 1880s and that the 1890s saw Chinese "druggists, butchers, hucksters, cart and boat cab owners, barbers, laundrymen and legal sellers of opium and ganja (marijuana)" and holding 50% of food shops and 90% of liquor shops. By the end of the 19th century, the Chinese had transcended their early reputation for criminality and come to be regarded as worthy, law-abiding, industrious citizens.

Unlike other communities of overseas Chinese, the Chinese of Guyana swiftly abandoned traditional Chinese customs, religion and language. Their eager acceptance of Christianity contrasted sharply with the strong attachment of other overseas Chinese communities to their ancestral religions and to Christian missionary conversion efforts. Many of the first generation Chinese Guyanese were Christians while in China, and most others converted swiftly on arrival. They built and maintained their own Christian churches throughout the colony and paid their own Chinese-speaking catechists. In 1860, Mr. Lough Fook, who had come from China to spread the gospel among the immigrants, established The Chinese Baptist Church of British Guiana, first at Peter's Hall and later at Leonora. An Anglican missionary, Wu Tai Kam, arrived in the colony from Singapore in 1864 and successfully proselytized among the immigrants. He was given a government stipend as missionary to the Chinese immigrants, and was instrumental in founding the Chinese settlement at Hopetown. For those who were lucky enough to marry the few Chinese women in the colony, or to have migrated as families, domestic life was characterized by a sense of good breeding in familial relations. They always hung curtains in their rooms, and decorated them with looking-glasses and little pictures; their homes were regarded as models of cleanliness and comfort. The descendants of the Chinese from China spoke and wrote English fluently, so that by the 1920s there was no longer a need for Chinese-speaking pastors. In the first years of the 20th century, prosperous Guyanese Chinese began sending their sons and daughters to England for university.

By the mid-twentieth century, the descendants of the original immigrants had assimilated so completely into mainstream British colonial culture that they had become uninteresting to anthropologists. Anthropologist Morton Fried found them completely at home in European culture and its local manifestation, with no ancestral cult, no ancestral tablets, no ceremonial burial ground or permanent record of genealogy and no trace of Chinese medicine. The grandchildren and great grandchildren of the original immigrants did not even know the Chinese characters for their own names. The young anthropologist declared with exasperation, "these people are scarcely Chinese."

The Chinese continued to prosper in the retail trades and contributed substantially to the development of the colony's gold, diamond and bauxite resources, and to its professional community and its political, religious and sporting life. The three pillars of the community were the Chinese Association, the Chinese Sports Club and St. Saviour's Church, an Anglican house of worship founded, funded and pastored by the Chinese Guyanese.

The 20th century saw substantial emigration by the Chinese Guyanese professional class, a process accelerated following independence, making the Chinese Guyanese principally a diaspora community today. In 2012, 7.72%, of foreign-born Guyanese nationals were born in China.

== Notable people ==
- Anthony Chinn, actor
- Arthur Chung, President of Guyana
- Doreen Chung, First Lady of Guyana
- Jonathan Foo, ethnic Chinese cricketer born to a Chinese father and Indian mother
- Hilton Cheong-Leen, Hong Kong politician
- Sandra Granger, First Lady of Guyana
- Robert Victor Evan Wong, politician, civil engineer, businessman, rancher
- Frank Woon-A-Tai, Shotokan karate instructor
- G. Raymond Chang, Canadian businessman and philanthropist
- D'Pharaoh Woon-A-Tai, actor

== See also ==
- Chinese Caribbeans
- Caribbean Chinese cuisine
