= Windsor Forest, Guyana =

Windsor Forest
- Village
- Location in Guyana
- Coordinates: 6.8464°N 58.2395°W
- Country: Guyana
- Region: Essequibo Islands-West Demerara
- Neighbourhood Council: La Jalousie/Nouvelle Flanders

Population (2012)
  - Total: 1,602

Windsor Forest is a village in the Essequibo Islands-West Demerara of Guyana. It is located along the Atlantic Ocean coast. It was the first Chinese settlement in Guyana, however few Chinese remain. It was the birthplace of the Guyana President Arthur Chung.

== Overview ==
Windsor Forest started as a plantation. In the early 20th century, Windsor Forest and neighbouring La Jalousie, were purchased by the government, divided into acre sized lots, and offered for rent.

The economy of the village is mainly based on rice cultivation. It has a primary school and a health centre. Between 1900 and 1974, Windsor Forest had a railway station on the Demerara-Essequibo railway.

The area is prone to flooding. It used to be protected by mangrove forests. A citizen's initiative by Deopaul Somwaru aims to replant the mangroves along the coast.

== Chinese settlement ==
Between 1853 and 1879, Indentured labourers from China and British Raj India were brought to work on the plantations in British Guiana. On 12 January 1853, the first labourers arrived aboard the Glentanner, and 105 people were assigned to the Windsor Forest plantation making it the first Chinese settlement in Guyana. In 1986, a monument was erected in front of the primary school to commemorate the event.

Few Ethnic Chinese remain in the village. Of the 1,602 inhabitants of Windsor Forest at the 2012 census, only five identified as ethnic Chinese, and 1,484 as Indian.

== Notable people ==
- Arthur Chung: President of Guyana.
- Doreen Chung: First Lady of Guyana.
