= Viola Burnham =

Guyanese politician (1930–2003)

Viola Burnham OR

Vice President of Guyana
- In office August 1985 – October 1991 Serving with Hamilton Green, Mohamed Shahabuddeen and Ranji Chandisingh
- President: Desmond Hoyte

First Lady of Guyana
- In role 6 October 1980 – 6 August 1985
- President: Forbes Burnham
- Preceded by: Doreen Chung
- Succeeded by: Joyce Hoyte

Spouse of the Prime Minister of Guyana
- In role 1967 – 6 October 1980
- Prime Minister: Forbes Burnham
- Preceded by: Bernice Lataste
- Succeeded by: Ruth Reid

Personal details
- Born: Viola Victorine Harper; 26 November 1930 New Amsterdam, Berbice, British Guiana
- Died: 10 October 2003 (aged 72)
- Spouse: Forbes Burnham (m. 1967)
- Children: 3 (one adopted)
- Parents: James Nathaniel Harper (father); Mary Chin (mother)
- Education: University of Leicester; University of Chicago

Viola Victorine Burnham OR (née Harper; 26 November 1930 – 10 October 2003) was a Guyanese politician from People's National Congress (PNC), and wife and widow of Forbes Burnham.

== Early life ==
Burnham was born in New Amsterdam, Berbice, the youngest of eight children of schoolmaster James Nathaniel Harper and his wife Mary (née Chin). After her father died the family moved to Georgetown, where she attended Bishops’ High School on scholarship. After a brief job at The Argosy, she became a teacher, which led her to obtain a scholarship for university abroad. She earned a B.A. in Latin at University of Leicester, then her M.A. in Education at University of Chicago. She returned to Guyana teach Latin at Bishops High.

== Political sphere ==
In 1967, she married then-Prime minister Forbes Burnham (his second marriage) and they had two daughters. In 1967, she accepted the position of Vice-Chairperson of the Women's Auxiliary of the PNC, where she was involved in reorganization and assuming more responsibility for women's issues. In 1976, she was elected as Chairperson of what by this time had become the Women's Revolutionary Socialist Movement (WRSM). Through the WRSM, Burnham was responsible for projects related to women's employment and education in Guyana as well as the greater Caribbean region. She was a founding member and Vice-President of the Caribbean Woman's Association. She also led the Guyanese delegation for the first three United Nations Conferences on Women. She also served as a chair on the Guyana National Commission for the Year of the Child.

After the death of Forbes Burnham, she joined the cabinet of Desmond Hoyte as Vice President and deputy prime minister responsible for education, social development and culture in August 1985. She was elected to Parliament in 1985. She eventually stepped down from the parliament and from the cabinet in October 1991.

== Honours ==
In 1984, she received the Order of Roraima (OR).
