= Thunder in Guyana =

2003 documentary film

- Directed by: Suzanne Wasserman
- Written by: Suzanne Wasserman; Amanda Zinoman
- Produced by: Suzanne Wasserman
- Cinematography: Debra Granik
- Edited by: Amanda Zinoman
- Music by: Basya Schechter
- Distributed by: Women Make Movies
- Release date: 2003
- Running time: 50 minutes
- Countries: Guyana; United States
- Language: English

Thunder in Guyana is a 2003 documentary film directed by Suzanne Wasserman. It chronicles the relationship between the Chicago-born Janet Rosenberg and Cheddi Jagan, a native of Guyana on South America's northern coast, who fell in love, married and set off for the British colony to start a popular socialist revolution, that led them first to jail and later to the Presidency of the nation.

Thunder in Guyana was featured in numerous film festivals and more widely in February 2005 on Independent Lens, a series on PBS.

== Synopsis ==
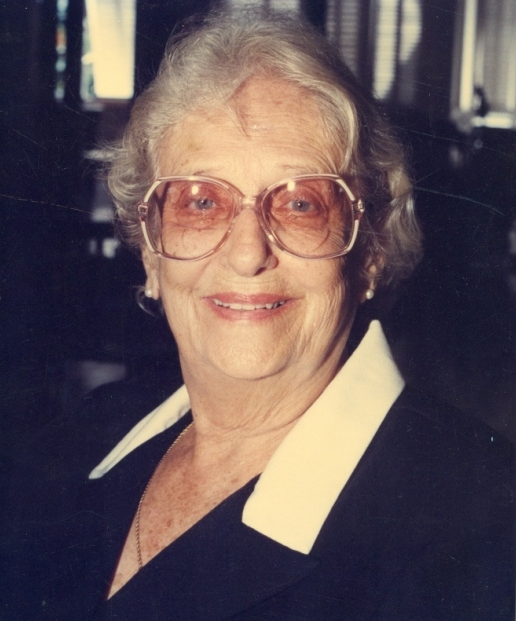
Janet Jagan in later life

A Jewish girl from Chicago, she grew up to become president of Guyana; a South American nation. Janet Rosenberg Jagan, pegged "the Second Eva Peron", in an effort to explain how her typical Jewish upbringing led to her out-of-the-ordinary adult life pursuing service work and Marxist politics in Latin America. "I don't know that people see White when they look at me," Janet said in an interview, believing that her years in Guyana allowed her to resemble the general population. "I've been around for a long time. Fifty-four years is a long time."

Thunder in Guyana uncovers an atypical story of a woman who refused to allow her reservations or others' opinions to prevent her from doing what she believed in. Using Janet’s biography, the film brings life to her extraordinary history. Newsreel footage traces the British colony's slow emancipation and assertion of independence, while discussions with Janet and her followers describe what the courageous female elected official did to organize and educate the country's impoverished working class.

Her youth was relatively ordinary in many ways, but she was by no means an average youngster. Relatives and relations remember that in her younger years, Janet was remarkably energetic and good-looking, and she was a stand out in all she undertook. Possessing exceptional discipline and goal orientation she successfully trained to become a world class swimmer, who might have competed in the Olympics. But it was also in her nature to be defiant. In the film, Janet laughs recalling how enraged her mother and father were when they learned that, as a teenager, she took flying lessons with the allowance they provided.

Rebelliousness was not why Janet journeyed to Guyana; it was love and it kept her in the country for the remainder of her life. While a student at university, a handsome Guyanese exchange student, Cheddi Jagan, caught Janet's eye. As a team, they ventured into leftist politics, sharing controversial political ideals that excited them and would serve as the bond to their relationship. When Janet traveled with Cheddi back to his native country, her father believed she would return to the United States within one year. He was mistaken; Janet lived the majority of her adult life in Guyana, working with the government and public sector.

It is the suggestion of the film that Janet's Jewish background enabled her to connect to the poor laborers of Guyana. Ms. Jagan grew up in an antisemitic, mostly-gentile community that made her feel subjugated and diminished. She recalls that her male relatives struggled to find employment, and that her school friends would tell racially prejudiced stories that they did not completely understand. Her efforts for civil rights in Guyana was her personal means of opposing the discrimination she had experienced growing up.

The film asserts that Janet was viewed by the Guyanese population as a self-sacrificing and relentless force. "She's been there from the very beginning. She's put her neck out more than most Guyanese," Janet's Guyanese daughter-in-law exclaims. "She's more Guyanese than most Guyanese you'll meet," and adds, "she's more Guyanese than me!"

Janet, of course, was not an object of admiration by all Guyanese citizens. At the beginning of her involvement with Guyanese politics, her opponents spread rumors that she was a family member of the legendary American couple Julius and Ethel Rosenberg who were put to death for spying and an American journalist implied she was spreading propaganda to enlist communists.

At age 82 she still kept an office, happily working for the citizens of Guyana.
