= Desmond Hoyte =

President of Guyana, politician, lawyer (1929–2002)

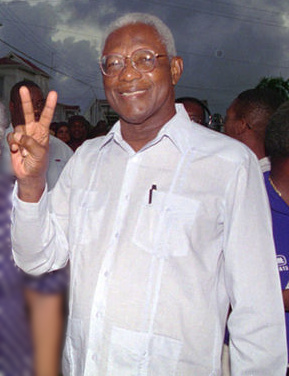
- Hoyte in 1997

3rd President of Guyana
- In office 6 August 1985 – 9 October 1992
- Prime Minister: Hamilton Green
- Vice President: Hamilton Green; Mohamed Shahabuddeen; Ranji Chandisingh; Viola Burnham
- Preceded by: Forbes Burnham
- Succeeded by: Cheddi Jagan

3rd Prime Minister and First Vice President of Guyana
- In office 16 August 1984 – 6 August 1985
- President: Forbes Burnham
- Preceded by: Ptolemy Reid
- Succeeded by: Hamilton Green

Personal details
- Born: 9 March 1929 Georgetown, British Guiana
- Died: 22 December 2002 (aged 73) Georgetown, Guyana
- Resting place: the Botanical Gardens
- Party: People's National Congress
- Spouse: Joyce Hoyte

Hugh Desmond Hoyte (9 March 1929 – 22 December 2002) was a Guyanese politician who served as Prime Minister of Guyana from 1984 to 1985 and President of Guyana from 1985 until 1992.

== Early life and education ==
Hoyte was born on 9 March 1929 to a middle-class family in Georgetown, the capital of British Guiana. He was educated at St Barnabas Anglican School and Progressive High School. In 1948, he joined the civil service, then entered public service as a teacher in Guyana and Grenada. While he was working, Hoyte earned an external B.A. from the University of London in 1950. In 1957, he went to the UK to pass his bar exams at the Middle Temple and earn an LL.B., which he received in 1959. In 1960 he joined the same law practice as Forbes Burnham (Clarke and Martin), before setting up private practice and became one of the leaders of the Guyana Bar Association. He would come to serve as a legal advisor to the Guyana Trades Union Congress. In 1962, he was appointed a member of the General Council of the People's National Congress. In 1966, he was appointed to the National Elections Commission, which supervised the 1968 Guyanese general election.

== Politics ==
After being a general council member for the party, he entered Parliament as a member of the People's National Congress in 1968 and soon began serving in the cabinet. He was Home Affairs Minister from 1969 to 1970, Finance Minister from 1970 to 1972, Works and Communications Minister from 1972 to 1974, and Economic Development Minister in 1974 to 1980. In all of his ministerial positions, Hoyte was a part of the movement of the Burnham administration towards a planned economy, particularly in his role as the Minister of Economic Development during the nationalization of the bauxite and sugar industries following the 1974 Declaration of Sophia. In 1973, he was appointed a member of the central committee of the PNC.

Following the December 1980 election he became one of five vice-presidents, with responsibility for economic planning, finance, and regional development.

In August 1984, Hoyte became Prime Minister and first Vice President, replacing Hamilton Green, who was widely seen at the time as Burnham's preference for successor.

== Presidency ==
Presidential standard of Desmond Hoyte

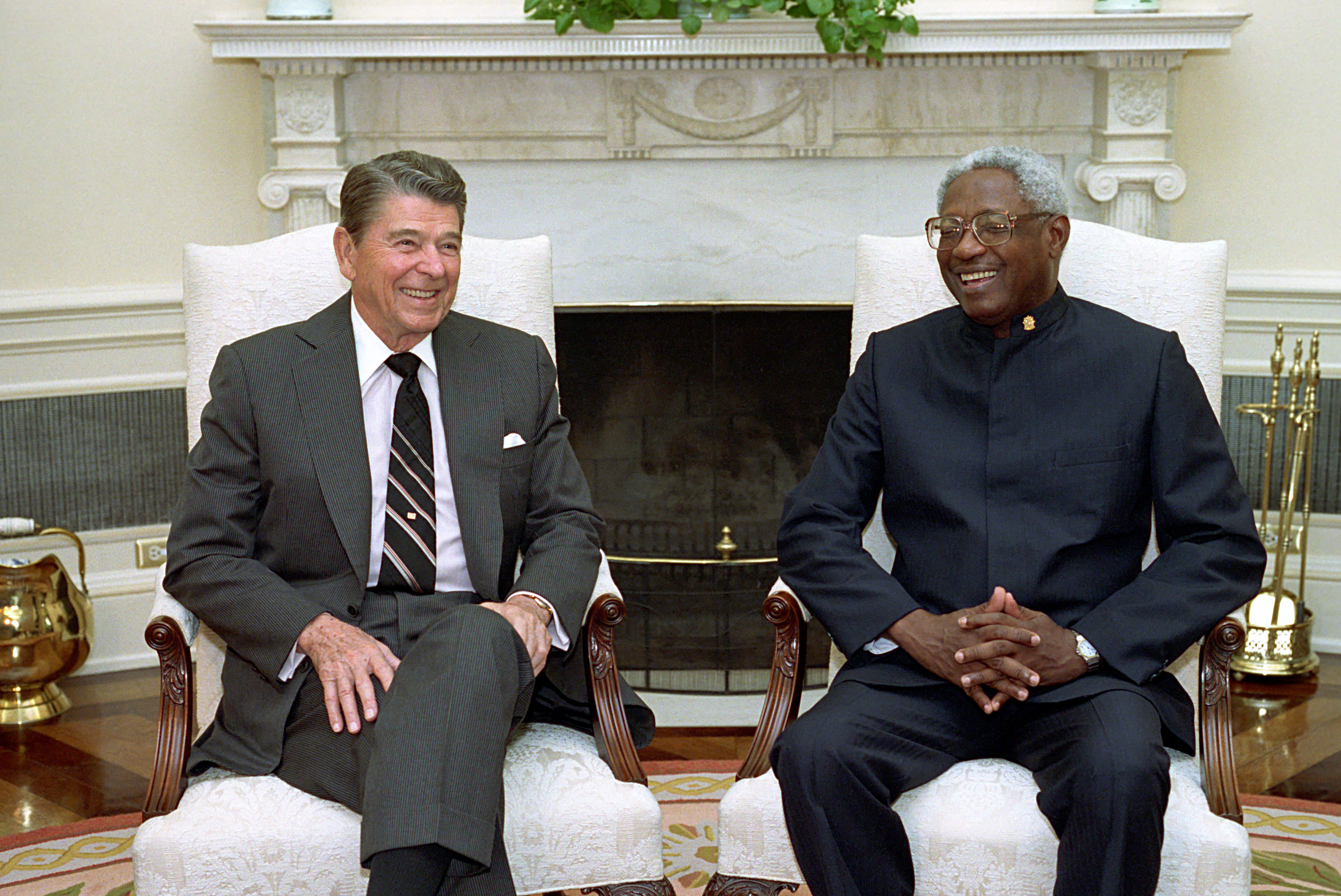
Desmond Hoyte meeting with Ronald Reagan in the Oval Office on 13 September 1988

On Burnham's death on 6 August 1985, Hoyte became the third President of Guyana. Shortly before Burnham's death, he and other members of the PNC had embarked on talks with the opposition People's Progressive Party attempting to achieve a national unity formula to deal with the country's problems. Hoyte announced his willingness to continue the dialogue, but also announced that a general election would be held on 9 December. Responding to criticisms of previous elections as fraudulent, he agreed to certain reforms.

Immediately after becoming President, Hoyte removed bans on imported food items and opened Guyana to greater international trade.

In July 1987, he hosted the President of the African National Congress, Oliver Tambo, for a four-day visit, highlighting the close links Guyana maintained with the liberation struggle in Southern Africa. Also in 1987, Hoyte established the Guyana Prize for Literature.

In 1989, Hoyte first proposed a conservation area in the Guyanese rainforest; this proposal would eventually become the Iwokrama Forest.

Hoyte was also Minister of Foreign Affairs from 1990 until 1992.

During Hoyte's presidency, violent crime decreased, but Hoyte failed to reduce levels of corruption within the government.

Hoyte used the increased powers of the presidency (changed by his predecessor in the 1980 Constitution) to move away from policies advocated by previous president Forbes Burnham which had led to high poverty rates and high debt. He also invited foreign investment and made peace with the International Monetary Fund, which angered others in his party. During Hoyte's tenure, Guyana's significant sugar industry saw a revival, and the economically important Omai Mine was opened and began production.

During his presidency, he would try to improve racial relations between Afro-Guyanese and Indo-Guyanese, being called derisively "Desmond Persaud" for his supposed better treatment of Indo-Guyanese people. Hoyte also re-established freedom of press.

=== 1992 General Election ===
Hoyte announced significant electoral reforms in 1990 prior to the 1992 election, influenced by former US President Jimmy Carter. These reforms included a ban on the military providing electoral services with the exception of for security purposes, counting being done at the place of voting, the establishment of an independent electoral commission and changes to ballots and ballot boxes. According to Hamilton Green, Jimmy Carter personally announced that overseas voting would no longer be allowed to the Guyanese public; overseas voting was used to manipulate the 1968 election in which the PNC consolidated its power.

Following Hoyte's electoral reforms, the 1992 Guyanese general elections were the first free and fair elections since 1964. In the lead-up to the election, Hoyte believed that the PNC could win a free and fair election. Initial returns showed an unmistakable trend in favour of the opposition PPP. When it became apparent that the PPP was on its way to victory, PNC party supporters took to the streets to attack the headquarters of the electoral commission to try to halt the vote count. Hoyte announced that he would resign if this action continued, thus ending the demonstration.

After two days of counting, Hoyte conceded defeat to the PPP and its leader, Cheddi Jagan.

== Post-Presidency ==
Hoyte remained leader of the PNC until his death, and also Minority Leader and Leader of the Opposition.

In 1994, the PNC split, with a new party being founded by Hamilton Green after he was expelled from the PNC for a public disagreement with Hoyte over electoral reforms and party discipline. According to Green, the disagreement rose from a party meeting at East Ruimveldt Secondary School, where Green opposed Hoyte's electoral policy on opposing overseas voting. Hoyte then appointed a panel to review the event, which resulted in Green's expulsion. Green's party, Good and Green Georgetown, won the Georgetown municipal elections, beating both the PNC and PPP.

Hoyte was the PNC candidate in the presidential elections of 1996 and 2001. He received second place both times (40.6% in 1996 and 41.7% in 2001).

In opposition, Hoyte obstructed several initiatives proposed by the ruling party, including constitutional changes and the establishment of a commission on race relations. He also conducted a campaign to overturn the results of the 1997 elections. He regularly protested the exclusion of Afro-Guyanese from government posts. After the 2001 elections, Hoyte's PNC refused to take seats in parliament. Bharrat Jagdeo, the elected President, held reconciliation talks with Hoyte in 2001, but they were unsuccessful.

He died of heart failure in Georgetown, Guyana on 22 December 2002, aged 73. His tomb is at the Botanical Gardens. After his death a television station had its name amended as a posthumous homage.

== Personal life ==
Hoyte married Joyce Noreen De Freitas in 1965. In 1985, his two daughters Amanda and Maxine died in a car crash while traveling on 30 April to hear him deliver the May Day address in the town of Linden. His sister-in-law and his driver also died; his wife Joyce was the lone survivor. Hoyte's wife, Joyce, died on 14 February 2011 aged 77. Hoyte had a sister, called Patricia. Hoyte and his family had a residence on North Road, Bourda, Georgetown, which was converted into a museum and library in his honour in 2016.

Political offices
Preceded by Ptolemy Reid	Prime Minister of Guyana; 1984–1985	Succeeded by Hamilton Green
Preceded by Forbes Burnham	Leader of the People's National Congress; 1985–2003	Succeeded by Robert Corbin
