= Joey Jagan =

Guyanese politician

Personal details
- Born: Cheddi Jagan Jr.
- Party: People's National Congress Party/Granger Fraction
- Other political affiliations: Unity Party of Guyana; Guyana Third Force
- Children: 1
- Parents: Cheddi Jagan; Janet Jagan
- Relatives: Suzanne Wasserman (cousin)
- Occupation: Dentist, politician
- Nickname(s): Joey Jagan; Cheddi Jagan II

Cheddi "Joey" Jagan Jr. is a dentist and a politician in Guyana.

== Early life and family ==
Jagan is the son of two past Guyanese Presidents, Cheddi Jagan and Janet Jagan. His father was a Hindu Indo-Guyanese whose parents came from India to work on the plantations of Guyana. His mother was an American Ashkenazi Jew from Chicago who was of Hungarian and Romanian Jewish descent and a supporter of Palestine. He has a sister, Nadira Jagan-Brancier.

== Political activity ==
In politics, he is the co-founder of the Unity Party of Guyana, a pro-capitalist party seeking to bring more foreign investment to Guyana (which made him an opposite to his parents, who were socialists).

In 2006, Jagan, joined with Peter Ramsaroop, Paul Hardy and Rupert Roopnarine to form the Guyana Third Force. In 2011, Jagan returned to the party of his father, the People's Progressive Party (PPP), having previously been a leading critic of it, along with Ramsaroop, the leader of Vision Guyana. Joey Jagan subsequently joined with People's National Congress and campaigned vigorously for their eventual victory in the Presidential election (a political/social organization in Guyana).

== Personal life ==
Jagan was a supporter of the People's National Congress (APNU).
