= SHIW =

SHIW or Shiw may refer to:

- Shiw Sahai Naraine (1924–2013), Guyanese engineer and politician
- Survey on Household Income and Wealth, a statistical survey conducted by the Sample Surveys Division of the Banca d'Italia
