= Odeen =

Odeen may refer to:

- Philip Odeen, corporate and government position executive
- Odeen Ishmael (1948–2019), veteran Guyanese diplomat
- Odeen, a leading character in The Gods Themselves
