= Sam Hinds =

Prime Minister of Guyana (1992–1997, 1997–1999, 1999–2015)

Sam Hinds OE
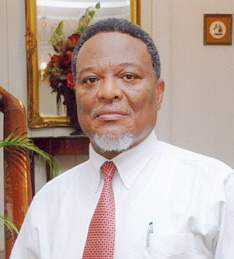
- Official portrait, 2006

Ambassador of Guyana to the United States
- Incumbent
- Assumed office 7 July 2021

Prime Minister and Vice President of Guyana
- In office 11 August 1999 – 20 May 2015
- President: Bharrat Jagdeo; Donald Ramotar
- Preceded by: Bharrat Jagdeo
- Succeeded by: Moses Nagamootoo
- In office 19 December 1997 – 9 August 1999
- President: Janet Jagan
- Preceded by: Janet Jagan
- Succeeded by: Bharrat Jagdeo
- In office 9 October 1992 – 6 March 1997
- President: Cheddi Jagan
- Preceded by: Hamilton Green
- Succeeded by: Janet Jagan

5th President of Guyana
- In office 6 March 1997 – 19 December 1997
- Prime Minister: Janet Jagan
- Vice President: Reepu Daman Persaud
- Preceded by: Cheddi Jagan
- Succeeded by: Janet Jagan

Personal details
- Born: Samuel Archibald Anthony Hinds; 27 December 1943 (age 82) Alexander Village, British Guiana (now Guyana)
- Party: People's Progressive Party
- Spouse: Yvonne Hinds
- Education: University of New Brunswick

Samuel Archibald Anthony Hinds (born 27 December 1943) is a Guyanese politician who was Prime Minister of Guyana almost continuously from 1992 to 2015. He also briefly served as President of Guyana in 1997. He was awarded Guyana's highest national award, the Order of Excellence (O.E.) in 2011.

He first became prime minister under Cheddi Jagan in 1992, following the October 1992 election, which was won by the People's Progressive Party (PPP) welcoming Hinds and others (Civics) to work with them. When Jagan died in March 1997, Hinds became President himself, and appointed Jagan's widow Janet as prime minister. For the December 1997 general elections, the PPP/C nominated Hinds as candidate for prime minister while Janet Jagan was the candidate for the presidency. Following the election, Janet Jagan was elected president and re-appointed Hinds as prime minister.

Prior to this, Hinds worked for the Alcan founded bauxite operation which was nationalized in 1971 rising to Vice President for Product Quality and Research and Development. By education, Hinds is a licensed and qualified chemical engineer, having graduated from the University of New Brunswick.

In August 1999, President Janet Jagan decided to resign, and temporarily replaced Hinds with Bharrat Jagdeo; Jagdeo thus became president upon her resignation, and he reappointed Hinds as prime minister. After the re-election of the government in the 28 August 2006 election, Hinds was sworn in as prime minister again in early September.

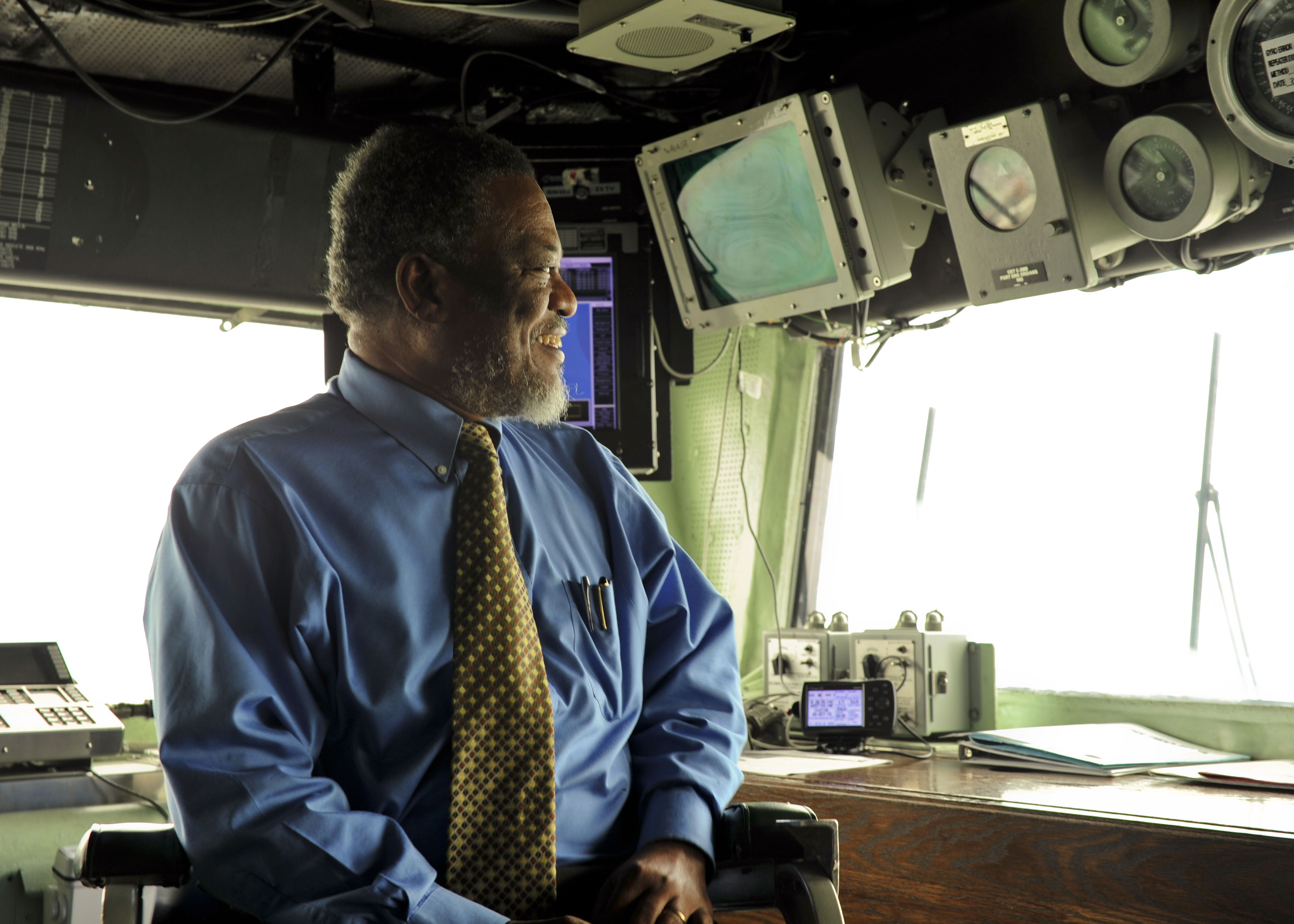
Hinds on the bridge of USS Iwo Jima, 2010

He was re-nominated as the 2011 prime ministerial candidate for the PPP in October 2011, although there were suggestions that he might step aside. After PPP/C candidate Donald Ramotar was elected president, Hinds was sworn in as prime minister again on 5 December 2011.

Following the opposition's victory in the May 2015 general election, Hinds was succeeded as prime minister by Moses Nagamootoo on 20 May 2015.

Sam Hinds is honored in the scientific name of a species of lizard, Kaieteurosaurus hindsi.

Hinds has served as the Guyanese Ambassador to the United States since July 2021. He presented his credentials on 7 July 2021.

Political offices
Preceded by Hamilton Green	Prime Minister of Guyana; 1992–1997	Succeeded by Janet Jagan
Preceded by Cheddi Jagan	President of Guyana; 1997	Succeeded by Janet Jagan
Preceded by Janet Jagan	Prime Minister of Guyana; 1997–1999	Succeeded by Bharrat Jagdeo
Preceded by Bharrat Jagdeo	Prime Minister of Guyana; 1999–2015	Succeeded by Moses Nagamootoo
