= Hoyte-Blackman Television =

- Country: Guyana
- Broadcast area: National
- Headquarters: Georgetown

Programming
- Language: English
- Picture format: 480i (NTSC)

History
- Launched: 30 July 1994
- Replaced: GUY TV 9
- Closed: July 2024
- Former names: Noel Blackman Television (1994-2004)

Links
- Website: https://www.facebook.com/GUYTV9

Availability

Terrestrial
- VHF: Channel 9

Hoyte-Blackman Television (HBTV Channel 9) was a Guyanese over-the-air television network. The channel gives its name to Noel Blackman, who was a former leader of the People's National Congress Reform.

== History ==
=== Noel Blackman Television ===
NBTV Channel 9 was formally inaugurated on 30 July 1994 at the Mandela Avenue in Georgetown, home to former government minister Noel Blackman, the namesake of the station. Initially, it ran for six hours a day (4pm to 10pm) with plans to increase at the short-term. The channel's launch came at a time of economic depression in Guyana, with no recovery planned for the coming times.

Mark Benschop left the station in June 2001 due to disagreements with the station's editorial guidelines.

=== Hoyte-Blackman Television ===
The station was renamed Hoyte-Blackman Television (HBTV) on 1 January 2004 in memory of Hugh Desmond Hoyte who was the president of the PNCR between 1985 and 1992. In 2010, it was one of the stations that had already picked up the rights to air local comedy series Mori J'Von.

=== GUY TV 9 ===
In the month of July in 2024, HBTV management was given to 'Chief Samsir' who would later rebrand the channel to 'GUY TV 9', on 11 July 2024, HBTV's Facebook account was rebranded to GUY TV 9, the new Facebook page would include higher quality broadcasts, a new logo, more professional branding and management, and even a new news segment. Broadcasts on VHF 9 changed to retransmissions of American channels such as Food Network and TBS with intermissions of GUY TV 9 news broadcasts.
