= Reepu Daman Persaud =

Guyanese politician

Pandit Reepu Daman Persaud

Vice President of Guyana
- In office 1999–2011
- Preceded by: Bharrat Jagdeo (1997)
- Succeeded by: Moses Nagamootoo (2015)

Minister of Agriculture
- In office 1992–2001
- President: Cheddi Jagan; Janet Jagan; Bharrat Jagdeo
- Preceded by: Robert Corbin
- Succeeded by: Navindranauth Omanand Chandarpal

Personal details
- Born: 16 January 1936 British Guiana
- Died: 6 April 2013 (aged 76–77) Georgetown, Guyana
- Party: People's Progressive Party/Civic
- Children: Vindhya Persaud
- Occupation: Politicians

Pt. Reepu Daman Persaud (16 January 1936 – 6 April 2013) was a Guyanese Hindu pandit and politician from the People's Progressive Party/Civic.

He was elected to the Parliament consecutively from 1964 to 2006. He served a member of cabinet between 1992 and 2001 as Minister of Agriculture and between 1997 and 2001 as Minister of Parliamentary Affairs as well. He was also twice appointed as the Second Vice President of Guyana - from March to December 1997, and from August 1999 to December 2011.

== Personal life ==
His daughter is Vindhya Persaud, a prominent politician and medical doctor currently serving as Minister of Human and Social Services in the cabinet of Irfaan Ali.
