= Deolatchmee Ramotar =

Accountant who was Guyana's eighth First Lady

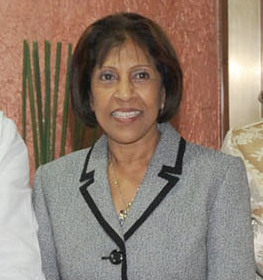
- Ramotar in 2015

First Lady of Guyana
- In role 3 December 2011 – 16 May 2015
- President: Donald Ramotar
- Preceded by: Role Vacant
- Succeeded by: Sandra Granger

Personal details
- Born: Deolatchmee Ramdular; 29 July 1949 (age 77) Huis t' Dieren, British Guiana
- Spouse: Donald Ramotar (m. 1974)
- Children: 3 (Lisaveta, Alvaro, Alexei)
- Education: Guyana Technical Institute
- Occupation: Accountant

Deolatchmee Ramotar (née Ramdular; born 29 July 1949) is a retired Guyanese accountant who was the First Lady of Guyana from 2011 to 2015. Her spouse, Donald Ramotar, was the 7th President of Guyana. They were married in 1974. They have three children, Lisaveta, Alvaro, and Alexei.

Ramotar has also worked as a teacher, a nurse, and an advocate for women’s and children’s issues.

== Life and career ==
Deolatchmee Ramdular was born on 29 July 1949 in Huis t' Dieren, Guyana, where she was also raised. She worked as a teacher after completion of her education until moving to Georgetown to attend the Georgetown Technical Institute.

In 1979, Ramotar began working as a nurse in the Georgetown Public Hospital, where she continued to work until 1992. During her work as a nurse, she received an accounting certificate. After she chose to stop working at the hospital due to its decline, the accounting certificate led to her working for the Sugar Industry Labour Welfare Fund as an Administrative Manager.

In 1997, her husband Donald Ramotar (who married her in 1974) became the General Secretary of the People's Progressive Party. Donald Ramotar was chosen by the party in 2011 to run for president. He won and was sworn in on 3 December 2011, making Deolatchmee Ramotar First Lady.

On 16 May 2015, Sandra Granger replaced Ramotar as First Lady of Guyana.
