= Joyce Hoyte =

Joyce Noreen Hoyte (November 30, 1934 – February 14, 2011) was the First Lady of Guyana from 1985 to 1992, she was the wife and widow of Hugh Desmond Hoyte.
