= High Level Advisory Group on Climate Financing =

United Nations Secretary-General Ban Ki-moon established a High-Level Advisory Group on Climate Change Financing (AGF) on 12 February 2010 for the duration of ten months. The group's aim was to "study potential sources of revenue that will enable achievement of the level of climate change financing that was promised during the United Nations Climate Change Conference in Copenhagen in December 2009."

== Composition ==
The group was co-chaired by Jens Stoltenberg, Prime Minister of Norway, Meles Zenawi, Prime Minister of the Federal Democratic Republic of Ethiopia. Guyana President Bharrat Jagdeo was the third head of state on the board, but was not a co-chair. Members included experts from developed countries, developing countries, and from international development organizations and the academic world. British Prime Minister Gordon Brown co-chaired with Zenawi from the group's formation in February 2010 to 6 June 2010, when he was replaced by Stoltenberg.

The group's mandate was to develop practical proposals on how to significantly scale-up long-term financing for mitigation and adaptation strategies in developing countries from various public as well as private sources.

== Report ==
The High-Level Advisory Group released its final report on 5 November 2010, just ahead of the 2010 United Nations Climate Change Conference in Cancun, Mexico. The report concluded that it is "challenging but feasible" to reach the goal of mobilizing US$100 billion annually for climate actions in developing countries by 2020.

The AGF Report examined various approaches, including existing and new public funding and increased private flows. Its definition of “public” finance includes “direct budget contributions” as one strand, with five others envisaging finance from carbon market auction revenues; revenue from international transport (shipping and airline taxes); carbon taxation; multilateral funds (most notably, IMF Special Drawing Rights); and an international financial transaction tax. Two work streams considering private finance will cover “using public finance to leverage private investment/finance” (including debt swaps and insurance schemes) and carbon markets (which includes CDM reform and sectoral proposals). In addition to the main report, they published eight different work streams paper, providing technical information and analysis for each finance source.

Although the AGF Report did not build a blueprint for implementing these sources, it does assess all sources based on eight criteria, which includes revenue, efficiency (carbon efficiency - the impact of a method on setting a price for carbon externality and overall efficiency - taking into account impacts on developed country growth and risks, equity (distribution of revenue), incidence (who really pays for the climate change mitigation and adaptation actions - should avoid payment by developing countries or inclusion of developing countries’ contribution in counting towards 100billion, practicality (feasibility before 2020), reliability, additionality to Official Development Assistance and acceptability (domestic political acceptability in both developed and developing countries).

== Criticism ==
Critics claimed that the group could contribute to the downgrading of UNFCCC negotiations, as well as complaining of a lack of transparency and a significant gender bias. Also, some civil society organizations do not agree that US 100 billion per year is sufficient for climate change financing, but overall, NGOs are content with the pressure on developed countries brought by the AGF report.

== Response ==
The United States government rejected all new innovative sources at international scale proposed in the AGF report, namely, Financial Transaction Tax (FTTs), Special Drawing Rights (SDRs), and Bunker Fuels in the Maritime and Aviation Sector. Although the cap-and-trade bill was rejected at the Congress in 2010, the U.S. government still considers a carbon market as the more viable way to finance climate change activities.

The European Union in general favors innovative sources. With the fate of the Kyoto Protocol undetermined beyond 2012, the EU has limited offset projects in Least Developed Countries. Under the G20 leadership of the French presidency, the EU considered a Financial Transaction Tax at the European Union level, and channel the revenue for climate, health, education and other international development purposes. A detailed report was published stating European Commission's response to the AGF report. Although "takes note" is relatively weak wording, the report was referenced in all submissions to the UNFCCC regarding climate finance, especially innovative sources.

Outside the UNFCCC system, the AGF report is extensively referenced in climate financing discussions at the G20, European Union, International Maritime Organization, and other international forums. As many other potential financing sources, accessing any new sources will require political will. Efforts have been made under the G20 to remove fossil fuel subsidies, but they were not successful once again at the recent G20 meeting in Seoul.

Similar to the AGF report, there are many high-profile reports; addressing climate finance sources with a focus on innovative sources. The international community is making critical decisions on how to mobilize up to US$100 billion per year by 2020 based on recommendations in these reports.

== See also ==
- Economics of global warming
- Stern Review
