= Varshnie Singh =

First Lady of Guyana

Varshnie Uma Singh (formerly Varshnie Uma Jagdeo) was the First Lady of Guyana from 1999 to 2007, she was the wife of Bharrat Jagdeo until their separation in 2007. They were married under Hindu rites, however it was never legally registered.
