= Embassy of Guyana, Washington, D.C. =

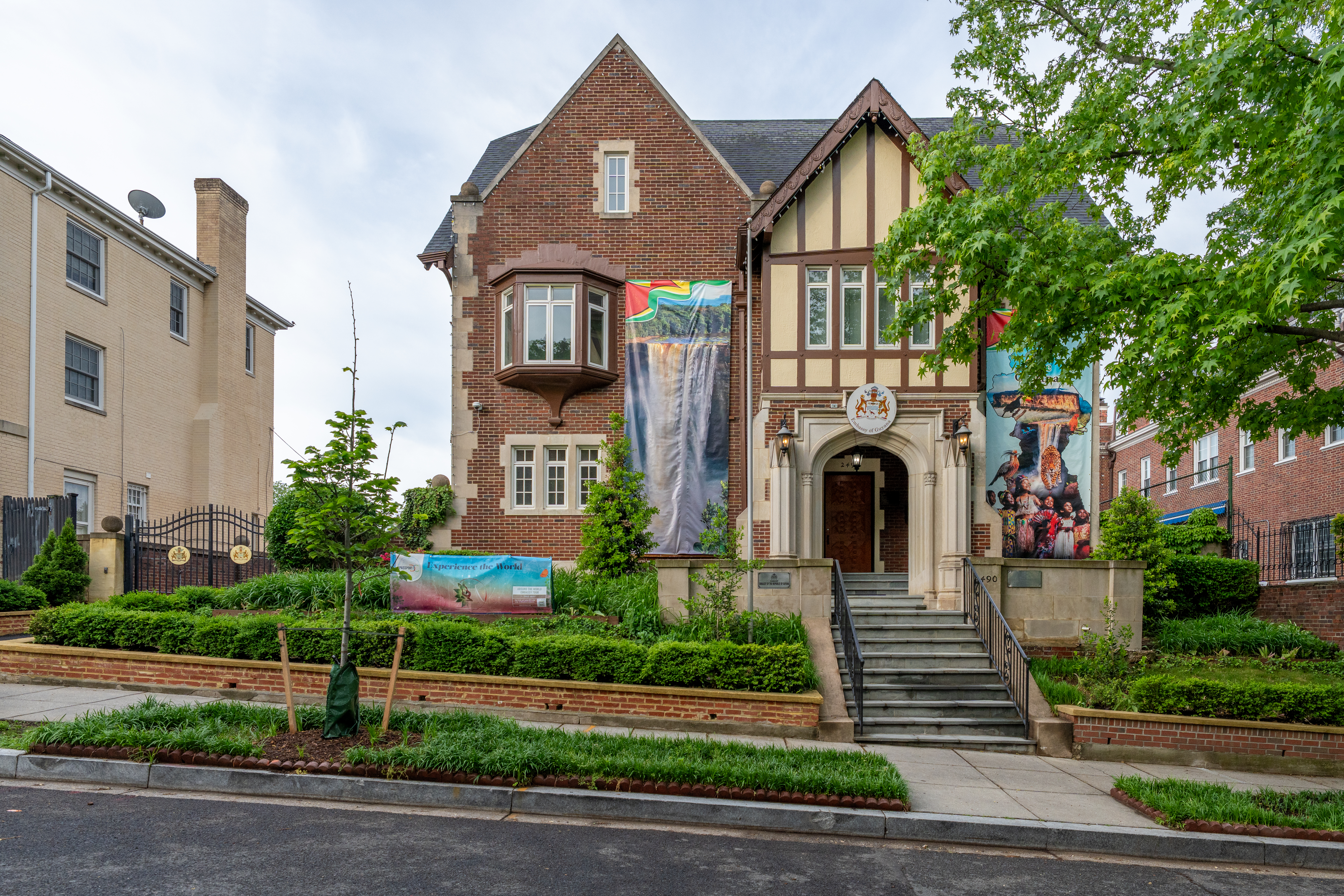
- Location: Washington, D.C.
- Address: 2490 Tracy Place, N.W.
- Coordinates: 38°55′1″N 77°3′20.7″W
- Ambassador: Samuel Hinds, CCH
- Website: https://guyanaembassydc.org

The Embassy of the Co-operative Republic of Guyana to the United States of America is located at 2490 Tracy Place, NW, Washington, DC. The Permanent Mission of Guyana to the Organization of American States (OAS) is also located there. The Embassy of Guyana was established in 1966, and the Permanent Mission in 1991.

Samuel A. A. Hinds, O.E. was appointed Guyana's eleventh Ambassador to the US in 2021.

In executing and promoting the foreign policy objectives of the Government of Guyana, the Embassy states that it seeks to:

- Uphold Guyana's sovereignty and territorial integrity;
- Strengthen political and economic relations with the United States and other nations represented in Washington, DC and at the OAS;
- Promote and facilitate investment, trade, business and tourism opportunities for Guyana; and
- Attend to the consular needs of Guyanese residents in the US, as well as supporting Guyanese nationals wishing to remigrate.

In addition to the Embassy in Washington, DC, there is a Consulate General in New York City and Honorary Consuls in Atlanta, Georgia; Miami, Florida; and Los Angeles, California.
