= Kaieteurosaurus =

Conservation status
- Data Deficient (IUCN 3.1)

Scientific classification
- Kingdom: Animalia
- Phylum: Chordata
- Class: Reptilia
- Order: Squamata
- Family: Gymnophthalmidae
- Genus: Kaieteurosaurus; Kok, 2005
- Species: K. hindsi

Binomial name
- Kaieteurosaurus hindsi Kok, 2005

Genus of lizards

Kaieteurosaurus is a genus of lizard in the family Gymnophthalmidae. The genus is monotypic, i.e., it has only one species, Kaieteurosaurus hindsi. It is endemic to Guyana where it is known from the Kaieteur National Park.

== Etymology ==
The genus name refers to the type locality, Kaieteur National Park, combined with the Greek sauros for "lizard". The specific name hindsi honors Sam Hinds, the Prime Minister of Guyana.

== Ecology and description ==
The holotype of K. hindsi (as of 2016 the only known specimen) was collected in tall mixed forest at 440 m (1,440 ft) above sea level. It is a small lizard measuring about 44 mm (1.7 in) in snout-to-vent length (SVL).

== Behavior ==
K. hindsi is terrestrial and diurnal.

== Reproduction ==
K. hindsi is oviparous.
