= Vindhya Persaud =

Guyanese politician

Vindhya Vasini Persaud
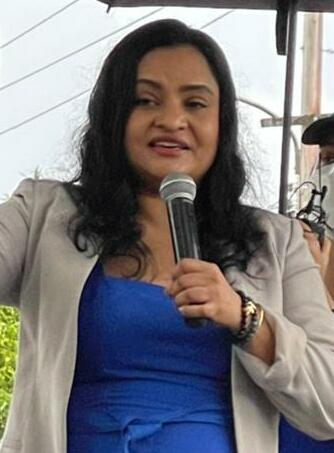

Minister of Human Services and Social Security in Guyana
- Incumbent
- Assumed office 5 August 2020
- Appointed by: Irfaan Ali

Personal details
- Born: Georgetown, Guyana
- Party: People's Progressive Party (Guyana)
- Parent: Reepu Daman Persaud (father)
- Occupation: Medical doctor and politician

Vindhya Vasini Persaud (born Georgetown, Guyana) is a medical doctor and politician. She is the current Guyanese Minister of Human Services and Social Security. She was appointed Minister since August 2020. She is the daughter of Reepu Daman Persaud.
