= Suzanne Wasserman =

American film director, historian and writer

Suzanne Rachel Wasserman
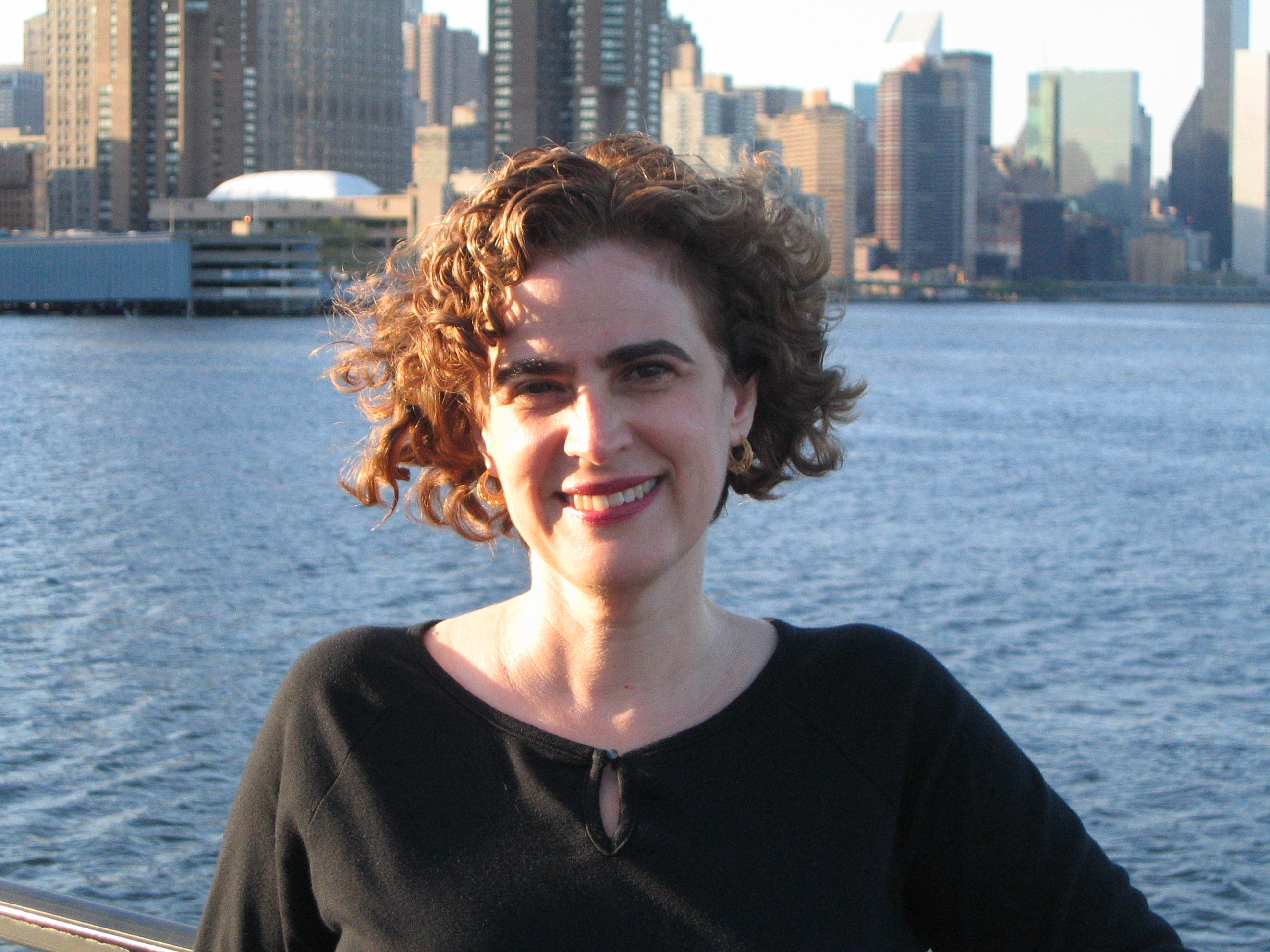
- Wasserman in 2006
- Born: May 26, 1957; Hyde Park, Chicago, Illinois, U.S.
- Died: June 26, 2017 (aged 60); Manhattan, New York, U.S.
- Education: University of Wisconsin (BA); New York University (PhD)
- Occupations: Historian, Professor, writer, and film director
- Spouse: David Stern
- Children: 1
- Relatives: Janet Jagan (aunt); Joey Jagan (cousin); Stanley Wasserman (second cousin)

Suzanne Rachel Wasserman (May 26, 1957 – June 26, 2017), was an American historian, professor, writer, and film director. In addition to her tenure as director of the Gotham Center for New York City history, she was also known for her first film, Thunder in Guyana (2003), which she wrote, produced, and directed. The film documented the life of her mother's first cousin, Chicago-born Janet Rosenberg Jagan, the president of Guyana from 1997 to 1999.

== Early life and education ==
Wasserman was born on May 26, 1957, in Hyde Park, Chicago, Illinois, the daughter of Jewish parents Edward Wasserman, a psychoanalyst and social progressive and Eileen (née Kronberg), an artist and activist for peace who started an artists' cooperative gallery in Hyde Park. Her paternal grandfather Samuel Wasserman, from an old-world religious Jewish family, immigrated to America around 1920 from the western Ukrainian town of Kamianets-Podilskyi, then part of the Russian Empire. He had an interest in social causes, and was briefly active in the labor movement in the 1930s.

Wasserman was one of four sisters along with her twin sister Tina and younger sisters, Stephanie and Nadine. She graduated from Kenwood Academy prior to beginning her undergraduate studies at Brandeis University. According to Wasserman's sister, while growing up in Chicago, "Suzanne was very interested in history because there were so many people in Hyde Park with really interesting backgrounds, whether they were associated with the University of Chicago or whether they had an immigrant story or whether they were political".

Wasserman earned a bachelor's degree in history from the University of Wisconsin after transferring from Brandeis. Brandeis had a large Jewish enrollment and it likely influenced her future career focus, as did her senior thesis at Wisconsin, where she studied her college town, writing on life in Madison in the 1960s. She obtained her PhD from New York University in American history and wrote her doctoral dissertation on life on the Lower East Side during the Depression.

== Career ==
=== History professor, and author ===
In the 1980s, she made New York City, particularly the Lower East Side, her residence and the center of her work in a wide array of publications, exhibitions and educational programs. After completing her PhD at New York University, she worked as a professor at the New School for Social Research and Iona College teaching American history, world history, urban studies and other topics. She published widely on the Great Depression, Jewish nostalgia, housing, restaurant culture, tourism, pushcart peddling, silent films, the Jewish silent screen siren Theda Bara, 19th-century saloons and 21st-century street fairs. In the 1990s, she worked as a consultant and then staff member for the Lower East Side Tenement Museum.

=== Director of CUNY's Gotham Center for New York City History ===
In 2000, she was hired as associate director of the Gotham Center for New York City History, then a start-up organization at the Graduate Center of the City University of New York. She was later promoted to director. The group brought together teachers, students, scholars, librarians, archivists, filmmakers and museum curators to make the city's history more accessible. As the Gotham Center's Director, Wasserman created and organized seminars and conferences, built its website, and managed teaching programs that brought New York history into school classrooms. One historian noted that Wasserman's work "was aimed at understanding the deep cultural and social networks that still supported certain ethnic institutions on the Lower East Side". While at New York University, she worked as an instructor of museum studies and public history in conjunction with her position as director of the Gotham Center.

=== Film ===
During her tenure as Director of the Gotham Center, Wasserman established her second career as a filmmaker, writer, and director. She directed four documentaries, which were shown in many film festivals and on the PBS series Independent Lens and America ReFramed, among others.

== Best known films and publications ==
- "Schpritzing, Shvitzing and Fressing: Or, a Critical Look at Memories of the "good Old Days" on New York's Lower East Side", 40 pages, One edition,(1984), held by WorldCat Identities.
- "Thunder in Guyana", (2003), director, writer and producer. The life story of Suzanne's mother's cousin, Janet Rosenberg Jagan who briefly became President of Guyana in December, 1997, holding the post for twenty months after the death of her husband who formerly held the position.
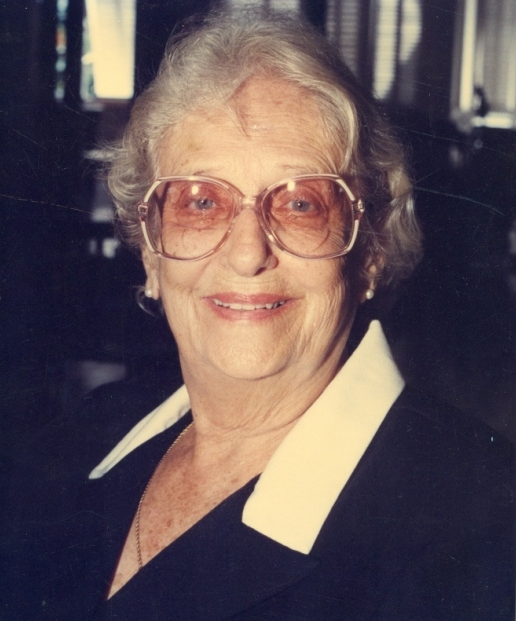
  Janet Jagan in later life
  With Editor and Co-Writer, Amanda Zinoman, Cinematography by Debra Granik, and Executive Producer, Deborah Shaffer. The film is distributed by Women Make Movies (462 Broadway, 5th Floor, New York, NY 10013)
- "Brooklyn Among the Ruins", (2005), a short video documentary about Paul Kronenberg, a sixty year old subway buff and former math tutor and delivery truck driver, who built a life-size 1930's motorman's car in his apartment in Sheepshead Bay, Brooklyn. Through his deep appreciation for the decaying New York subway stations, Paul reminds us of our own aging process.
- One episode documentary about the film, "Thunder in Guyana", (2005), for Independent Lens, a series featured on PBS
- "Life on the Lower East Side, 1937–1950", (2006) Co-author of book with Peter E. Dans, photographs by Rebecca Lepkoff (Princeton Architectural Press, New York)
- "Sweatshop Cinderella", (2010), a video documentary short about the Jewish immigrant writer Anzia Yezierska, who came to America from Poland around 1890, and brought to light struggles of Jewish and later Puerto Rican immigrants in New York's Lower East Side.
- Meat Hooked!, Phizmonger Pictures, (2013) Explores 200 years of the craft of butchering, its modern renaissance, and the lives of three butchers, including Jeffrey Ruhalter, who had a family run shop in the Essex Street Market on New York's Lower East Side. First aired July 7, 2013, on PBS. The film follows two other butchers; Jessica and Joshua Applestone at Fleisher's in Kingston, NY and Jake Dickson at Chelsea Market, near the Meat Packing District of Manhattan. The film follows the meat making process from farm to table and includes scenes at a recent pig slaughter in Stone Ridge, NY as well as an organic farm in Schoharie, NY.
- Children and Their Discontents, an unfinished film about the children of psychoanalysts.

Wasserman also consulted with director Ron Howard on the film Cinderella Man (2005), providing information on New York's Lower East Side during the depression.

== Final days ==
Wasserman died on June 26, 2017, at her home in Stuyvesant Town in Manhattan. According to her son, Raphael Stern, the cause of death was progressive supranuclear palsy, a rare brain disorder.
