= Doreen Chung =

Guyanese politician

First Lady of Guyana
- In role 17 March 1970 – 6 October 1980
- President: Arthur Chung
- Preceded by: Position created
- Succeeded by: Viola Burnham

Personal details
- Born: Doreen Pamela Ng-See-Quan c. 1932 Windsor Forest, West Coast Demerara, British Guiana
- Died: 5 September 2009 (aged 77) Georgetown, Guyana
- Resting place: St. Jude's Church, Blankenburg, West Coast Demerara, Guyana
- Spouse: Arthur Chung (m. 1954; died 2008)
- Children: 2

Doreen Pamela Chung (née Ng-See-Quan; Chinese: 吴思群, c. 1932 – 5 September 2009) was a Guyanese public figure and the wife of the first Guyana President Arthur Chung. She served as the inaugural First Lady of Guyana from March 1970 until October 1980.

Chung was born Doreen Pamela Ng-See-Quan in Windsor Forest, West Demerara, British Guiana. In 1954, she married the future Guyana President Arthur Chung, with whom she had two children, Diane Pamela and Raymond Arthur. The couple remained married for 54 years, until President Arthur Chung's death on 23 June 2008.

Doreen Chung died at St. Joseph Mercy Hospital in Georgetown, Guyana, on 5 September 2009, at the age of 77. Her funeral was held at St. Saviour's Church in the Charlestown neighborhood of Georgetown. Chung was buried in the cemetery of St. Jude's Church in Blankenburg, West Coast Demerara. She had resided in Bel Air Springs, Guyana.
