= Freedom House bombing =

1964 bombings, Georgetown Guyana

- Part of British Guiana unrest 1964
- Location: 6.81170671°N 58.16246331°W; Freedom House and compound of Guiana Import-Export Corporation Georgetown, Guyana;
- Date: 17 July 1964; 62 years ago 10:30 (Guiana Import-Export Corporation); 10:35 (Freedom House) (GMT-4)
- Target: People's Progressive Party
- Attack type: Bombing
- Weapon: Time bombs
- Deaths: 2
- Injuries: 19
- Perpetrator: Unknown
- Accused: 3
- Convicted: 0

The Freedom House bombing was carried out on the morning of Friday 17 July 1964, at the headquarters of the People's Progressive Party (PPP), Georgetown, in what was then British Guiana and is now Guyana. A few minutes earlier, another bomb went off at the offices of the Guiana Import-Export Corporation (often known as Gimpex), approximately 400 metres away. Gimpex was a trading company privately owned by the PPP. One person was killed at each location, and there were many other people injured, including Janet Jagan, wife of British Guiana's premier.

== Violent unrest during 1964 ==
In the months leading up to the bombing, British Guiana went through considerable political turmoil. Industrial unrest started to deteriorate from January 1964, when a strike by sugar workers belonging to the Guyana Agricultural Workers' Union (GAWU), over the issue of union representation with the employers, had turned violent. This was largely between the supporters of British Guiana's two largest political parties, the People's Progressive Party, which endorsed GAWU, and the People's National Congress (PNC) which endorsed other unions. Both parties and unions tended to draw support from the country's different ethnic groups, with the PNC getting most support from the Afro-Guyanese ethnic group, and PPP from the Indo-Guyanese.

This escalated during through the middle of 1964 with a series of fire bombs, shootings, beatings and race riots. On 22 May 1964 the British appointed governor, Sir Richard Luyt declared a state of emergency, then on 29 May 1964 he expanded these powers further. This enabled the governor to restrict party political activities and deploy troops, in an attempt to regain order. On 1 June 1964 Mrs. Jagan resigned as minister for home affairs, accusing the police of being largely responsible for the ongoing violence.

== Explosion on board the Sun Chapman ==
By July 1964 there was still plenty of politically motivated violence in different parts of British Guiana, including houses getting torched, and with no end in sight. One area badly affected by violent unrest was around the town of Linden. On 6 July 1964 a large explosion destroyed the Sun Chapman, a river launch boat that provided a ferry service between Georgetown and Wismar, near Linden. Between 35 and 43 people on board were killed, with up to 12 people missing, presumed dead, or unidentified. Ten people were injured. Five more people were killed in the violent disorder that ensued around Wismar. Many of the victims on the Sun Chapman were supporters of the PNC.

The precise cause of the explosion has not been resolved, but many people in British Guiana believed it was a bomb attack, targeted at PNC supporters. Consequently on 6 July 1964 the governor gave additional sweeping emergency powers to the army and courts, in an attempt to stop the violence. Before the date of the Freedom House bombing, and excluding the Sun Chapman incident, there had been at least 75 deaths in the previous five months. Given that Linden was a bauxite mining town, the disaster may have been due to a poorly safeguarded freight consignment of explosives.

== Events on 17 July 1964 ==
At the time of the bombings on 17 July, the three main party leaders, Premier Cheddi Jagan, opposition leaders Forbes Burnham for the PNC, and Peter D'Aguiar leader of the United Front (UF), were in a meeting, elsewhere in Georgetown, trying to resolve a way forward from the political impasse created by the outbreaks of violence. During the meeting the politicians heard the loud explosions. The Gimpex bomb came first, at about 10:30 a.m. The bomb went off in the yard in front of the building, at 23 Brickdam Street, killing a member of staff working in the yard, Edward Griffith. This was followed, a few minutes later, by a second explosion. Jagan interrupted the meeting to telephone the police, to discover that the explosions had rocked Gimpex's compound and Freedom House, at which point Jagan closed the meeting.

Freedom House had a bookstore on the ground floor of the building, that had two other floors, at 41 Robb Street, close to the intersection with Wellington Street. At the time there were around 36 people in the building, most working on the top floor. The bomber entered the shop, made a purchase, but did not wait for change and left a box behind. The assistant working in the bookstore, Michael Forde, noticed the package and asked his manager for advice. She suggested that the box be thrown out of Freedom House, to a small area of grass between Freedom House and the Wellington Street intersection. Forde was in the process of leaving by the building's side door, carrying the package, when the bomb went off, killing Forde. Forde was an activist in the party's youth organisation, the Progressive Youth Organisation. He was buried in Le Repentir Cemetery, and PPP officials continue to lay wreaths on his grave on the anniversary of his death.

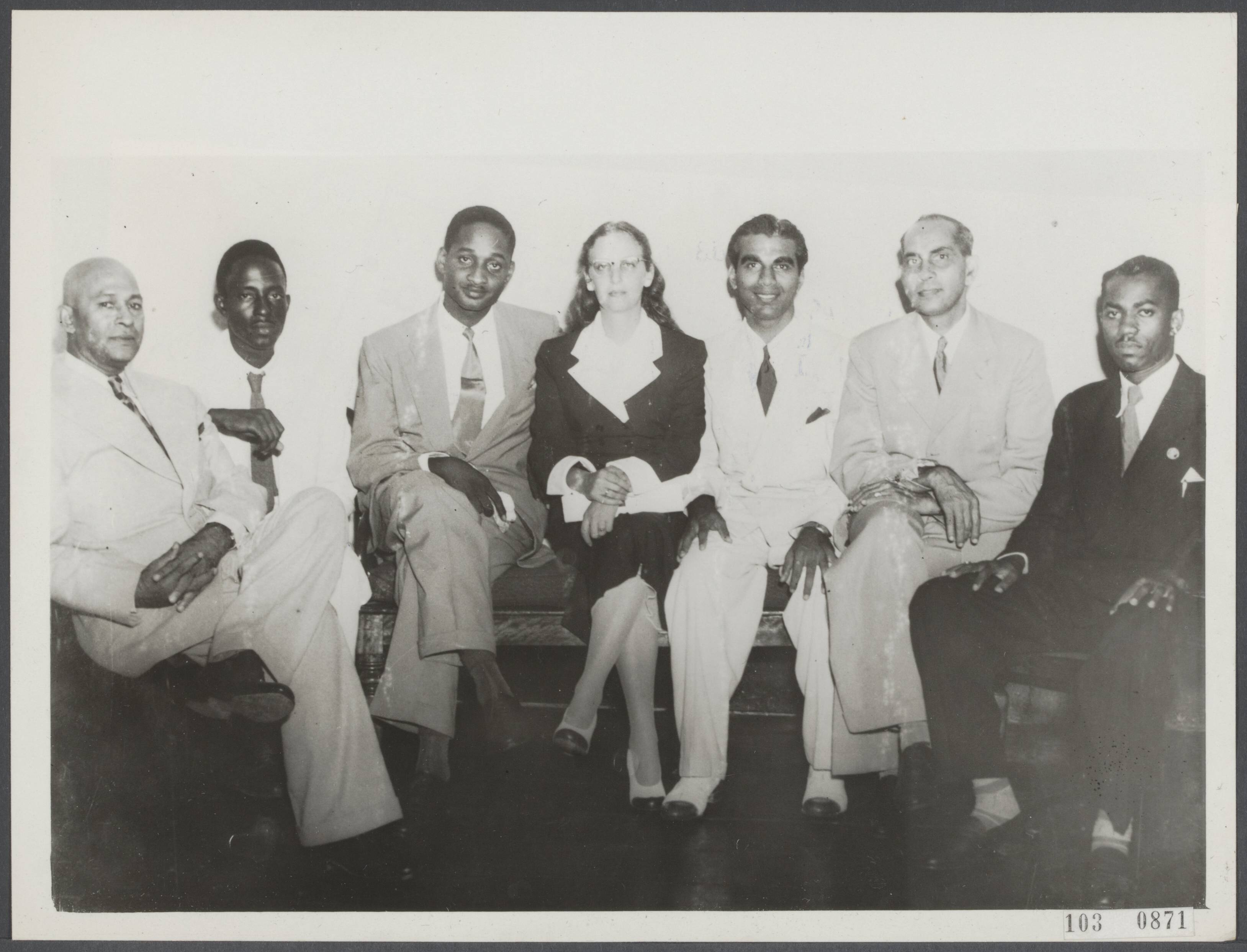
Earlier photo of Janet Jagan, centre, with Burnham left of her and Cheddi Jagan right. October 1953

Mrs. Jagan, who was the party's General Secretary, was working in Freedom House at the time, as was Mary Nunes, wife of the education minister Cedric V. Nunes. Mrs. Jagan's injuries, to her hand, were not serious. In all, fourteen people were injured, eight were seriously hurt. Riot police attended the building, and used tear gas to disperse the crowds that arrived at the site after hearing the bomb blast. At the Gimpex offices, in addition to the fatal injuries to Griffith, five people received minor injuries, one casualty was admitted to hospital. There was considerable damage to the building and stock held at Gimpex.

The day after the explosions, Mrs. Jagan issued a statement condemning the bomb attacks: "A grim and determined effort by some elements in the opposition had been made to destroy Freedom House, headquarters of the PPP ... It is believed that the perpetrators of the bombing were seeking not only to destroy the symbol of the PPP and thus prevent its functioning, but to destroy the lives of the leaders and activists of the PPP who work at Freedom House."

A black and white newsreel by Reuters exists of the immediate aftermath of the Freedom House bombing, and shows extensive damage along the east side of Freedom House, with surrounding buildings also damaged. However the front of Freedom House sustained comparatively little damage. The newsreel also shows Cheddi Jagan visiting the scene.

== Arrests and torture of Emanuel Fairbairn ==
On 9 August 1964 Emanuel Fairbairn, a 31 year old, semi-literate. casually employed carpenter and sometime night watchman for Burnham's office, was arrested by the police. On 10 August he was charged with the murder of Forde. The police said that Fairbairn admitted he was involved with both bombs, and he heavily implicated the PNC in his statement. He said he had been paid by two other men to firstly store the bombs overnight, hand over the Gimpex bomb to another intermediary the next day, then Fairbairn placed the second bomb in Freedom House. A substantial collection of incriminating explosive material was allegedly found in his boarding house, and an itemised list ended up reported in the press. Fairbairn was to later claim that the bomb making equipment was planted by the police in his room during his arrest.

On 20 August 1964 two other men, implicated in Fairbarn's original statement, were charged. Godfrey Egerton was charged with the murder of Griffith at the Gimpex compound, and Claude Graham, a former police officer, was charged with possession of the two bombs. Both were PNC members, and the PNC leader, Forbes Burnham, was briefly detained earlier that week for questioning. His home and office were also searched and ammunition seized by the police, though he was not charged with any offence. These detentions, along with 3 other PNC members, were made under the governor's emergency powers.

Emanuel Fairbairn's confession, which contained a number of contradictions, was later ruled inadmissible as evidence. On 21 September Graham was formally acquitted, and Egerton's case was overturned a few weeks later. At the governor's behest, eleven police officers were suspended from duty in early November. Richard Luyt had read a medical report of injuries to Fairbairn, and then told the Colonial Office in London that the accused had second degree burns which covered much of his upper body, as well as to his genitals and legs. The governor's view was that these injuries had been inflicted while in police custody. On 20 November 1964 the police officers were charged with ill-treating Fairbairn.

On 9 February 1965 the director of public prosecutions issued a writ of nolle prosequi, which meant that Fairbairn would no longer be prosecuted for the murder of Forde.

=== Trial of police officers in New Amsterdam ===
Ten of the police officers were sent to trial, which opened on 18 March 1965 in New Amsterdam, due to the officers' previous work with the Georgetown courts. The court heard that Fairbairn was tortured in Brickdam police station at the start of a five day period of custody, and was beaten up so badly that when he was belatedly taken to St. Joseph Mercy Hospital he could not stand up. At one stage he had been hung off the floor via a cord tied around his scrotum. Once in hospital he was temporarily put on a liquids only diet, since his injuries were too severe for Mr. Fairbairn to be able to eat solid food. According to PNC politicians, Egerton was also tortured while in police custody.

Several weeks after the start of proceedings, on 9 April 1965, while Fairbairn was giving evidence against the police officers, the judge reluctantly declared a mistrial, after jurors were seen drinking and socialising with some of the accused. The judge noted, but didn't explain, that there were other problems with the proceedings. There were no further prosecutions, either of the police officers or of anyone involved in the two bomb attacks.

== Aftermath ==
On 26 July Cheddi Jagan persuaded the striking sugar workers to return to work, after a stoppage lasting six months. By this stage the death toll was running to at least 160 fatalities, but the level of violence started to reduce during the second half of 1964. On 7 December 1964 there was a general election in British Guiana, using a new proportional voting system and electoral roll. The PNC did well in this election, and Jagan was replaced as premier of British Guiana by Burnham.

There are many theories as to who caused the bombs to go off and why. X-13, a reference to a terror group allegedly connected with the PNC, was initially blamed by some supporters of the PPP, given the recent Sun Chapman incident. (Note: X-13 refers to a planning document with this reference, alleged to have been drawn up by PNC supporters. The PPP believed this terror unit existed within the PNC.) The CIA's account of the incident, which implied that the CIA had an agent inside the politicians' meeting room, suggested that the PPP might be responsible for the bombing, though it is difficult to square this with the risk to the premier's wife and other PPP staff members. The CIA's source said that when Cheddi Jagan was told the details of the bombings, he went white with shock and became extremely nervous.

The violent nature of the highly partisan and shifting politics of British Guiana, in its last years before independence, means that even now it is difficult to unravel who was behind the bombings. For example PNC activists believed the police fitted up and tortured a vulnerable person, to suit the PPP's narrative that the PNC were operating as a terrorist unit, whereas a PPP cabinet minister suggested that the PNC had facilitated the torture of Fairbairn, in order to prevent the trial and thereby discredit the PPP. The British Colonial Office internal report on the colony's violence came to the conclusion that the bombings were, "without much doubt", instigated by the PNC, but noted that neither side was blameless.

In 2007, over 40 years after the explosions, the General Secretary of the PPP wrote to the Stabroek News, stating that it was the arrest of Fairbairn, and seizure of bomb making activities, that brought an end to what he described as the "horrific violence unleashed by the PNC and the UF".

The explosion at Gimpex has received less attention, despite the bomb killing a member of staff. Gimpex was owned by the PPP as a trading arm connected with the PPP's close ties with its then allies, including the Soviet Union and Cuba. As a government the PPP was unable to trade freely with these countries, given the UK's colonial control of British Guiana. But as a private company Gimpex had no such restriction. This had not escaped the attention of the CIA.

Palmer in his book said that the ruthless pursuit of paranoid politics by both sides deliberately stoked up racial tensions, aided by corruption and tarnished by widespread violence. The police were both caught up and implicated in these events. Few, perhaps none, of the main political and government organisations come of this period with much credit. Fairbairn was collateral damage in the wider instability of the colony's institutions.

The damage to Freedom House was repaired, and the building remains the headquarters of the PPP. The bookstore has been named after Michael Forde.
