= Good and Green Guyana =

Good and Green Guyana (GGG) was a political party in Guyana.

== History ==
The party was established in 1994 by former Prime Minister Hamilton Green after he was expelled from the People's National Congress, and was initially named the Forum for Democracy, before becoming Good and Green Georgetown. The 1994 Georgetown City Council elections saw GGG defeat the PNC and PPP, allowing Green to become mayor.

In 1995 the party was renamed Good and Green Guyana. In the 1997 general elections it received only 0.4% of the vote and failed to win a seat. It did not contest any further elections.
