= Liberty House =

Liberty House may refer to:

- Liberty House Group, a United Kingdom-based multinational steel products company
- Liberty House (department store), a former American department store
