= Sandra Granger =

Guyanese academic and civil servant

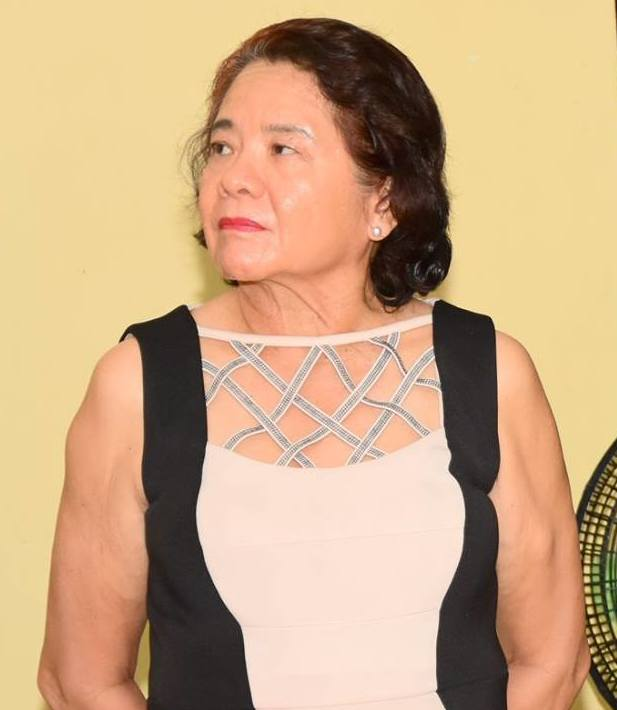
- Granger in 2016

First Lady of Guyana
- In role 16 May 2015 – 2 August 2020
- President: David A. Granger
- Preceded by: Deolatchmee Ramotar
- Succeeded by: Arya Ali

Personal details
- Born: Sandra Marie Chan-A-Sue c. 1947 (age 78–79) Bourda, Georgetown, British Guiana
- Spouse: David A. Granger (m. 1970)
- Children: 2
- Education: University of Guyana; University of Pittsburgh
- Occupation: Academic, civil servant

Sandra Marie Granger (née Chan-A-Sue; born c. 1947) is a retired Guyanese academic and civil servant who was the First Lady of Guyana, as the wife of President David A. Granger.

== Early life ==
Granger was born in the Bourda neighbourhood of Georgetown, British Guiana. Her father, born in Suriname, was of Chinese descent, while her mother was from the North-West District and of Amerindian ancestry. She attended Sacred Heart Primary School and St. Joseph High School. She married David A. Granger in 1970, and they subsequently had two daughters, Han and Afuwa.

== Career ==
Granger left the workforce after the birth of her second child, having worked for periods as a travel agent and later as a scriptwriter and traffic manager for Radio Demerara. Once her children were older, she began studying at the University of Guyana. She received two Bachelor of Arts degrees, one in English literature and one in Portuguese, and then attended the University of Pittsburgh on a Fulbright Scholarship, where she graduated with an M.A. in Brazilian literature and a graduate certificate in Latin American studies. After returning to her homeland, Granger spent several years as a lecturer in the University of Guyana's Department of Modern Languages, and served as assistant dean of the Faculty of Arts. In 1989 she began working as a rapporteur for the Secretariat of the Caribbean Community, where one of her first tasks was to report on the public reaction to the Grand Anse Declaration. She eventually became executive management officer in the Office of the Secretary-General, retiring in 2008.

== First Lady ==
Granger's husband, a former chief of the Guyana Defence Force, was sworn in as president in May 2015. As First Lady, her areas of interest have included women's rights, the prevention of sexual violence, and the welfare of children and the elderly. The Stabroek News has described as her a "modern, activist First Lady with an official office, a public policy agenda that is complementary to the government, regular speaking engagements, and a strong social media presence".
