= Vice President of Guyana =

Political position in Guyana

Vice Presidents of the Co-operative Republic of Guyana
- Flag of Guyana

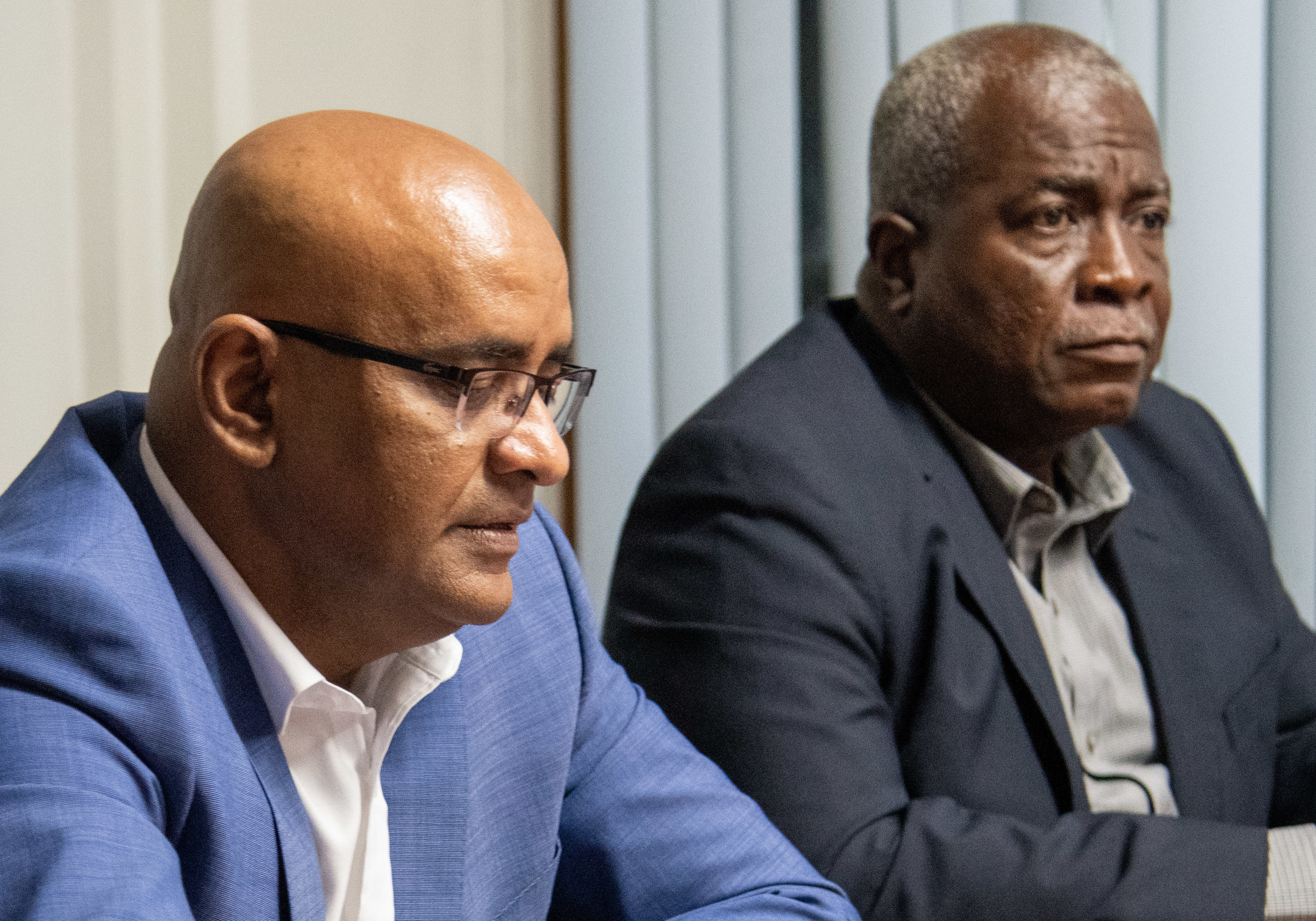
- Incumbent; Mark Phillips and Bharrat Jagdeo since 2 August 2020
- Appointer: President of Guyana
- Term length: Usual term of 5 years
- Inaugural holder: Ptolemy Reid; Shiw Sahai Naraine; Hugh Desmond Hoyte; Hamilton Green; Bishwaishwar Ramsaroop
- Formation: October 1980

Vice presidents of Guyana is a political position in Guyana. The Prime Minister of Guyana serves as the First Vice President and acts as the constitutional successor for the President of Guyana in case of a vacancy. Historically, other members of the cabinet have also been appointed as Vice Presidents, who can perform the functions of the President. Vice presidency was created in October 1980 when the executive presidency was created.

A history of the office holder follows.

== Vice President ==
Position	Name	Inaugurated	Left office	Notes
Vice President	Ptolemy Reid	October 1980	August 1984	
Vice President	Shiw Sahai Naraine	October 1980	October 1983	
Vice President	Hugh Desmond Hoyte	October 1980	August 1985	Became President
Vice President	Hamilton Green	October 1980	October 1992	
Vice President	Bishwaishwar Ramsaroop	October 1980	September 1984	
Vice President	Mohamed Shahabuddeen	October 1983	December 1988	
Vice President	Ranji Chandisingh	September 1984	October 1992	
Vice President	Viola Burnham	August 1985	October 1991	
Vice President	Sam Hinds	October 1992	March 1997	Became President
Vice President	Janet Jagan	March 1997	December 1997	Became President
Vice President	Reepu Daman Persaud	March 1997	December 1997	
Vice President	Sam Hinds	December 1997	May 2015	
Vice President	Bharrat Jagdeo	December 1997	August 1999	Became President
Vice President	Reepu Daman Persaud	August 1999	December 2011	
Vice President	Moses Nagamootoo	May 2015	2 August 2020	
Vice President	Carl Barrington Greenidge	May 2015	25 April 2019	
Vice President	Khemraj Ramjattan	May 2015	2 August 2020	
Vice President	Sydney Allicock	May 2015	2 August 2020	
Vice President	Mark Phillips	2 August 2020	Incumbent	
Vice President	Bharrat Jagdeo	2 August 2020	Incumbent	

== See also ==
- President of Guyana
- Prime Minister of Guyana
