= Odeen Ishmael =

Guyanese diplomat (1948–2019)

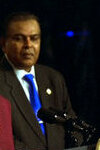
Image of Odeen Ishmael

Odeen Ishmael (January 29, 1948 – January 5, 2019) was a career Guyanese diplomat.

== Career ==
He last served as Guyana's ambassador to Kuwait, having been appointed to that post in January 2011. In 2012, he was appointed a non-resident ambassador to Qatar. Previously, he also served as ambassador to Venezuela (November 2003-January 2011) and to the United States (June 1993–October 2003) and as Permanent Representative to the Organization of American States (OAS) (June 1993–October 2003). At the OAS he served for two periods as Chairman of the Permanent Council. In 2009, he was elected to a one-year term as Chairman of the Latin American Council, the political governing body of the Latin American and Caribbean Economic System (SELA), headquartered in Caracas, Venezuela.

Diplomatic positions:

- Ambassador Extraordinary and Plenipotentiary of Guyana to State of Kuwait from January 2011 to June 2014 and Non-resident Ambassador Extraordinary and Plenipotentiary of Guyana to the State of Qatar from April 2013 to June 2014 .
- June 1993 to October 2003: Ambassador Extraordinary and Plenipotentiary to the United States of America and concurrently Permanent Representative to the Organization of American States (OAS).
- October 2003 to January 2011: Ambassador Extraordinary and Plenipotentiary of Guyana to Venezuela.

Diplomatic representation:

- November 1992 – Represented Guyana at the meeting of Information Ministers of the Caribbean Community in Kingston, Jamaica

OAS and UN

- 1993-2003 – Represented Guyana at the Organization of American States (OAS) in Washington, DC, USA – Served as Chairman of the OAS Permanent Council in October-December 1994 and April-June 2003. Participated in all the OAS General Assemblies from 1994 to 2003 other specialized meetings of the OAS in various countries of the Americas.
- July to September 1993 – Served as Vice-Chairman of the Permanent Council of the OAS
- 1994 - Elected Chairman of the General Committee to prepare the OAS draft convention on the situation of persons with disabilities.
- September 1994-December 1994 – Served as Chairman of the Permanent Council of the OAS.
- 1996 - Elected Vice-Chairman of the OAS Working Group on Sustainable Development.
- 1997 to 2001 – Head of Guyana's delegation to meetings of the Regional Negotiating Machinery of Caricom. Also as an OAS-trained trade negotiator, participated in the negotiations of the Free Trade Area of the Americas (FTAA).
- 1999 - Member of Guyana's delegation to the summit of the World Trade Organization in Seattle in 1999.
- 1993-2003: Member of Guyana’s delegation to the UN General Assembly.
- 2011-2013: Represented Guyana at meetings of the Alliance of Civilizations (organized by the UN and the OIC)

OIC

- 1997 – 2003: Head of Guyana's delegation to meetings of Foreign Ministers of the Organization of Islamic Cooperation (OIC).
- Member of Guyana’s delegation to the Summits of Heads of States of the OIC in Tehran (1997) and Qatar (2000).
- 2012: Head of Guyana’s delegation to the meeting of Foreign Ministers of the Organization of Islamic Cooperation (OIC) in Djibouti.

Summit of the Americas

- Chief negotiator of Guyana at the Summits of the Americas in 1994 (Miami), 1998 (Santiago de Chile) and 2001 (Quebec City), and at the Summit of Sustainable Development in Bolivia (1996).
- From 2001 to 2003: Served as Caricom’s representative on the executive committee of the Summit Implementation Review Group (SIRG) of the Summit of the Americas. He was also a leading negotiator in the process that led to the establishment of the Inter-American Democratic Charter in 2001.
- Represented Guyana at various meetings of the Summit of Americas process in various countries of Latin America and the Caribbean from 1995 to 2003.

Latin American and Caribbean Economic System (SELA)

- 2003-January 2011: Head of Guyana’s delegation to SELA
- 2004-2006: Elected vice chairman of SELA’s governing body, the Latin American Council.
- 2009 – 2010: Elected as Chairman of SELA’s Latin American Council

UNASUR

- 2003-2012: Participated in numerous high-level meetings of the Union of South American Nations (UNASUR) and Petro-Caribe

Non-Aligned Movement.

- 2012: Head of Guyana’s delegation at the meeting held in Egypt of Foreign Ministers of the Non-Aligned Movement.

== Awards and honors ==
- 1974 Gandhi Centenary Gold Medal for academic achievement at the University of Guyana.
- 1997 The Cacique Crown of Honour (CCH), one of Guyana’s highest national awards, for work in diplomacy.
- 2002 Awarded, in the USA, the King Legacy Award for International Service from the International Committee to Commemorate the Life and Legacy of Martin Luther King, Jr.
- 2003 Joint resolution of the US Congress paying tribute to his diplomatic work in the United States.

== Political career ==
- 1972-1982: Served in the Central Committee and the leadership of the Progressive Youth Organization of Guyana.
- 1980 to 1988: Member of the Central Committee of the People’s Progressive Party (PPP) of Guyana.
- 1976-1992: Represented the PPP at numerous international conferences in South America, the Caribbean and Europe.
