= Arthur Chung =

President of Guyana from 1970 to 1980

His Excellency Arthur Chung OE
- 鍾亞瑟
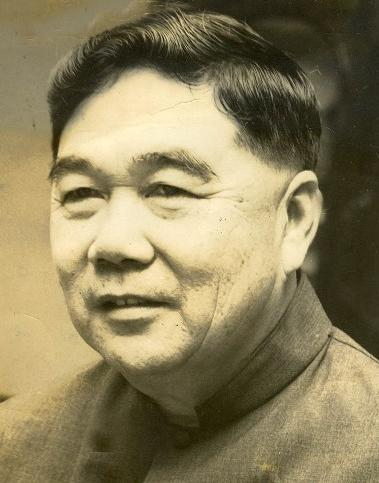

1st President of Guyana
- In office 17 March 1970 – 6 October 1980
- Prime Minister: Forbes Burnham
- Preceded by: Position established
- Succeeded by: Forbes Burnham

Personal details
- Born: Arthur Raymond Chung; 10 January 1918 Windsor Forest, British Guiana
- Died: 23 June 2008 (aged 90) Georgetown, Guyana
- Resting place: Guyana Botanical Gardens
- Party: Independent
- Spouse: Doreen Ng-See-Quan (m. 1954)
- Children: 2
- Education: Middle Temple

Arthur Raymond Chung (Chinese: 鍾亞瑟; 10 January 1918–23 June 2008) was President of Guyana from 17 March 1970 to 6 October 1980. He was the first ethnic Chinese president and head of state of a non-Asian country. A leader in Guyana's fight for independence during the British colonial era, Chung was honoured with Guyana's highest national honour, the Order of Excellence (O.E.).

== Early life and career ==
Chung was born into a Chinese Guyanese family at Windsor Forest village at West Coast Demerara in British Guiana; he was the youngest of Joseph and Lucy Chung's eight children. Arthur was educated at Windsor Forest, Blankenburg, and Modern High School. In 1954, he married another native of Windsor Forest, Doreen Pamela Ng-See-Quan, with whom he had one daughter and one son.

Before civic service, Chung was an apprentice surveyor and sworn land surveyor. In the early 1940s, Chung entered the Middle Temple of London, England, and qualified as a barrister in 1947. He returned to Guyana and was later appointed an acting magistrate. He became a magistrate in 1954 and a senior magistrate in 1960. Chung also served as Registrar of Deeds and of the Supreme Court. He then became a puisne judge and finally an Appeal Court judge in 1963.

== President of Guyana ==
When Guyana became a republic under the dictatorship of Forbes Burnham in 1970, the Guyanese National Assembly elected Chung president, making him the first president of Guyana; he took office on 17 March 1970. As president, Arthur Chung was the commander-in-chief of Guyana's Armed Forces and chancellor of the Orders of Guyana. Ten years later, a constitutional revision transformed the presidency into an executive position, and Burnham succeeded Chung as president on 6 October 1980. During his time as president of Guyana, the office was that of a ceremonial head of state with the powers of the governor-general of Guyana, while Prime Minister Forbes Burnham was the head of government.

President Arthur Chung met Neelam Sanjiva Reddy and Indira Gandhi at a diplomatic meeting with the Indians.

During his presidency, on June 27, 1972, Guyana established formal diplomatic relations with China, making Guyana the first English-speaking Caribbean country to establish diplomatic relations with the People's Republic of China. In 1977, President Chung of Guyana visited China and met with officials and ambassadors.

Presidential standard under President Arthur Chung

== Later years ==
Chung died aged 90 on 23 June 2008 at his home at Bel Air Springs, Georgetown. In the two months prior to his death he had been hospitalized a number of times, and he was last released from the hospital on 20 June.

A week after his death, he was buried at the Seven Ponds in the Botanical Gardens.

== Legacy ==
In 2015, it was announced that the Guyana International Conference Centre (GICC) would be renamed the "Arthur Chung Convention Centre" to commemorate President Arthur Chung, and newly elected President David A. Granger stated: "I would like the first President in this country to be remembered. ... this is the 45th anniversary year of becoming a Republic and Mr Chung was the first person of Chinese descent who was President in a non-Asian country and it was historic." After undergoing rehabilitative work, the Arthur Chung Convention Centre was recommissioned in June 2018.

Political offices
Preceded by Office established	President of Guyana; 1970–1980	Succeeded by Forbes Burnham
