= Bishwaishwar Ramsaroop =

Guyanese politician (1939–2021)

Vice President of Guyana
- In office October 1980 – September 1984

Personal details
- Born: 28 November 1939 Georgetown, Guyana
- Died: 16 August 2021 (aged 81) New York City, U.S.
- Party: People's National Congress (Guyana)

Bishwaishwar "Cammie" Ramsaroop (28 November 1939 – 16 August 2021) was a Guyanese politician from People's National Congress. Prior to his political career, he was a teacher and minister in the Forbes Burnham administration. From October 1980 to September 1984 he was one of the Vice Presidents. Ramsaroop played a pivotal role in the establishment of Trinidad and Tobago's first diplomatic mission with the creation of the Guyana High Commission on Alexandra Street, Port-of-Spain in February 2020.
