= Peter Ramsaroop =

Hon. Peter Ramsaroop, MP
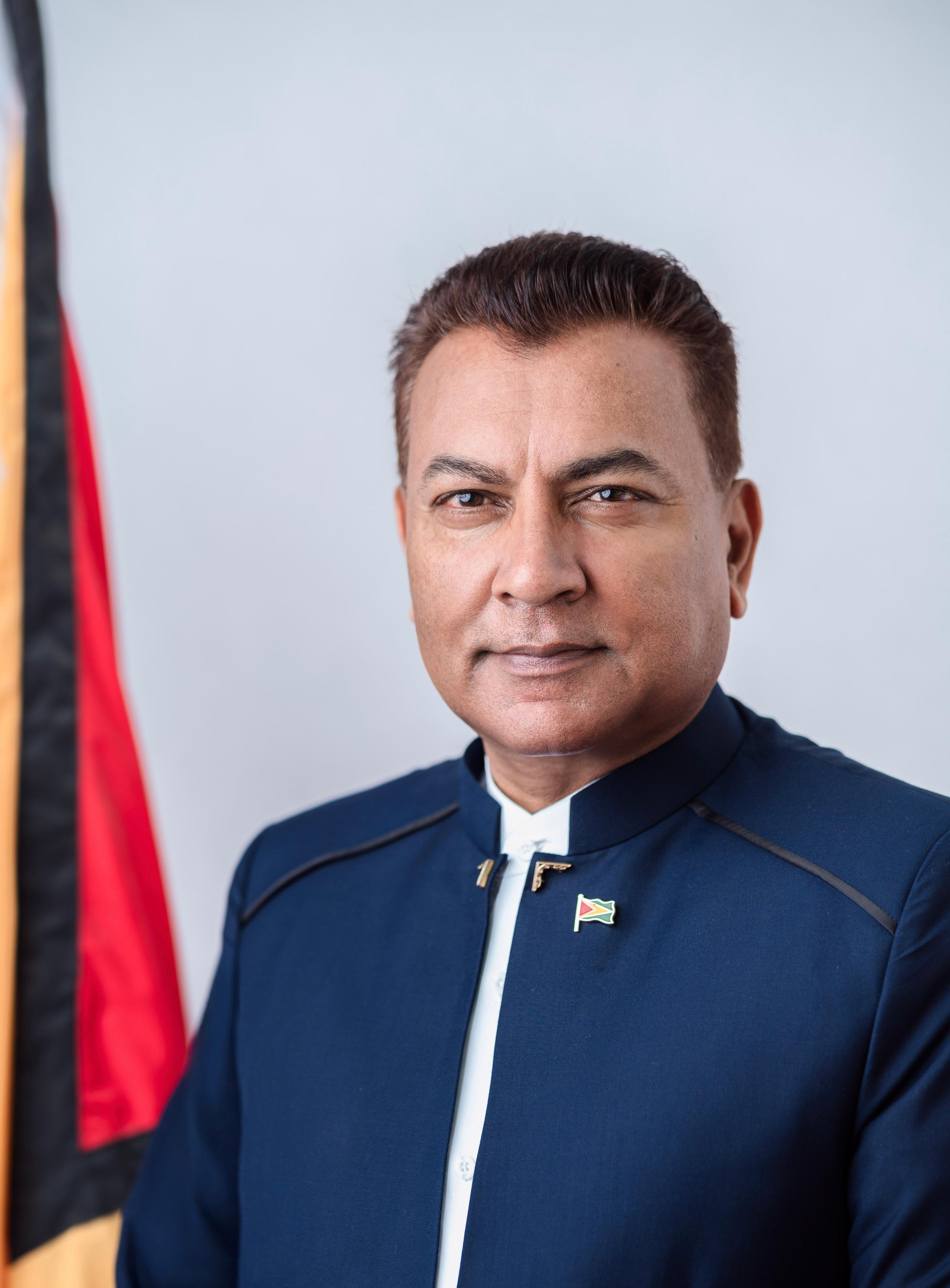
- Hon. Peter Ramsaroop, MP in September 2025
- Born: Peter Ronald Ramsaroop; 20 June 1962 (age 64); Guyana, South America
- Education: Park University (BS); University of Missouri (MBA); Greenleaf University -Awaiting full accreditation (PhD)
- Known for: 2011 presidential candidate

Peter R. Ramsaroop (born 20 June 1962) is a Guyanese entrepreneur, author, and politician. On 2 October 2020 he was appointed by the President of the Cooperative of Guyana, His Excellency, Dr. Mohamed Irfaan Ali as Guyana's Chief Investment Officer and Agency Head of the Guyana Office for Investment, under the Office of the President of the Cooperative Republic of Guyana. In 2025, Ramsaroop was elected to serve the 13th Parliament of Guyana.

He previously was the chairman of Vision Guyana, a social/political non-profit organization based in Guyana. He was previously the CEO of Alliance for Change and a presidential candidate for the 2011 elections before siding with the People's Progressive Party (PPP). He was also a parliamentary candidate for the 2015 General Elections in Guyana under the PPP.

== Career ==
Ramsaroop was chairman/founder of Evolvent, a cyber-security and technology company in Washington DC. He also was chief executive officer of Infonomic Solutions and chairman/founder, HealthCPR Technologies. Ramsaroop was controller and chief information officer (CIO) of UltraLink, Inc., an Allianz AG company, and as practice director and CIO, First Consulting Group. In 2008, he was director of the Caribbean Coalition for John McCain's presidential campaign. In 2012, Guyana's president, Donald Ramotar, appointed Ramsaroop to the Guyana Tourism Authority.

Ramsaroop served in the US Armed Forces. His assignments included duty in Europe during the Cold War, staff assignments at US Air Force headquarters at the Pentagon, and served in Operation Desert Storm/Shield in SouthWest Asia. (DD 214 May 1997) Ramsaroop is the recipient of the Kuwait Liberation Medal, The Meritorious Service Medal with two oak leaf clusters, the Air Force Commendation Medal and the Air Force Achievement Medal with valor for service during the war. He also received the Marksmanship ribbon. Ramsaroop made history in the US military, holding two enlisted and two officer ranks in one year.

Ramsaroop returned to Guyana in 2004 after the company he founded was acquired. He then founded a political party contesting the Guyana presidential election in 2011. Ramsaroop was a fierce opposition candidate to the government. In 2010 during his campaign for the presidency, he was accused by a tenant of having cameras in one of his real estate buildings; however, no evidence was found of any wrongdoings. The Chief Justice of Guyana ordered the police to stop the investigations and return the equipment they had seized.

Just prior to the 2011 election he aligned forces with the ruling party, the People's Progressive Party.

== Columnist ==
Ramsaroop was a weekly columnist for Guyana newspapers Stabroek News and Kaieteur News. He also contributed to the state newspaper Guyana Chronicle and the Guyana Times.

== Education ==
He received his Bachelor of Science from Park College and his MBA from University of Missouri. He holds a PhD from Greenleaf University, where he is listed as faculty. This university is awaiting full accreditation He has held faculty appointments at Belleville Area College and City Colleges of Chicago. He was also an associate professor at the Uniformed Services University School of Medicine and an adjunct professor at Webster University.

== Publications ==
Ramsaroop's publications include the self-published books Securing Business Intelligence - Knowledge and Cybersecurity in the Post 9/11 World (ISBN 0-9728247-1-5) and Surfing the Leadership Wave (ISBN 0-9728247-0-7). He was coeditor of Advances in Federal Sector HealthCare – A Model for Technology Transfer (ISBN 0-387-95107-5).
