= Hamilton Green =

Prime Minister of Guyana; Mayor of Georgetown, Guyana

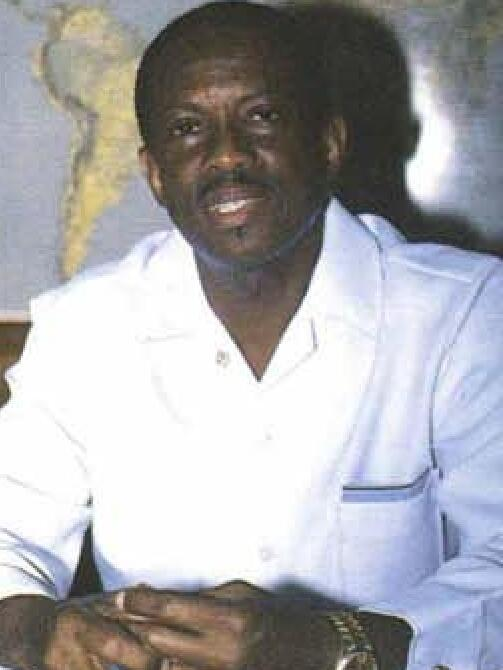
- Green in 1987

4th Prime Minister and First Vice President of Guyana
- In office 6 August 1985 – 9 October 1992
- President: Desmond Hoyte
- Preceded by: Desmond Hoyte
- Succeeded by: Sam Hinds

Mayor of Georgetown
- In office 1994–2016
- Succeeded by: Patricia Chase-Green

Personal details
- Born: Hamilton Belal Mohammed Green; 9 November 1934 (age 91) Georgetown, British Guiana
- Party: People's National Congress (Formerly); Forum for Democracy

Hamilton Belal Mohammed Green (born 9 November 1934) is a Guyanese politician who served as the fourth prime minister of Guyana. He is the first and only Muslim Prime Minister of Guyana, along with being the first and only Muslim head of government in the Western Hemisphere.

== Career ==
Green is an active trade unionist and active in politics since 1961. He was a member of People's National Congress (PNC). He was minister of works and hydraulics 1969-1972, minister of public affairs 1972-1974, minister of cooperatives and national mobilization 1975-1981. He was appointed as one of the five Vice Presidents in the cabinet of Forbes Burnham in October 1980, with ministerial portfolio of public welfare and labour, and later the portfolio of minister of agriculture. He also served as the Prime Minister of Guyana from 6 August 1985 to 9 October 1992. He was removed from office in 1992 when free and fair elections were held in Guyana under the direct supervision of President Jimmy Carter.

In March 1993, Green sued the People's National Congress for violation of his constitutional rights by expelling him from the party. Following this, he formed his own party, Good and Green Guyana (GGG).

Green, who was born in Georgetown, Guyana, is also a former Mayor of Georgetown, in office from 1994 to 2016.

In 2003, he was one of the most prominent people to attend the Summit of World Leaders sponsored by Sun Myung Moon. He is a member of the presiding council of the Universal Peace Federation.

Political offices
Preceded by Desmond Hoyte	Prime Minister of Guyana; 1985–1992	Succeeded by Sam Hinds
