= Shiw Sahai Naraine =

Guyanese politician (1924–2013)

Vice President of Guyana
- In office October 1980 – October 1983
- President: Forbes Burnham

Personal details
- Born: Shiw Sahai Naraine; 4 March 1924 British Guiana
- Died: 31 July 2013 (aged 89) Canada
- Party: People's National Congress

Shiw Sahai "Steve" Naraine (4 March 1924 – 31 July 2013) was a Guyanese engineer and politician from People's National Congress.

Naraine attended Queen Mary's College, London University. Upon graduating in 1951, he returned to British Guiana and was appointed district engineer, Essequibo, then executive engineer in 1956. In 1957, he became deputy director of public works and in 1960, Director of Drainage and Irrigation in the Drainage and Irrigation Department.

In 1961, he earned a diploma from Delft University of Technology in the Netherlands in the area of sea defence. A government restructure changed the title of the role, making Naraine the Chief and Works Hydraulics Officer. In 1965, he studied water resources development at the University of Colorado.

Naraine was elected to the Parliament in the 1970s, and held a cabinet portfolios in the Forbes Burnham administration including as minister of housing between 1972 and 1974, Senior Minister of Works and Transport between 1974 and 1980, and Vice President of Guyana from October 1980 to October 1983, and minister of works and transport and later social infrastructure between 1980 and 1983. After he retired from the government, Naraine was appointed as high commissioner to India, Sri Lanka and Bangladesh.

In 1984, he received the Cacique Crown of Honour (C.C.H).
