= Janet Jagan =

President of Guyana from 1997 to 1999

Janet Jagan OE
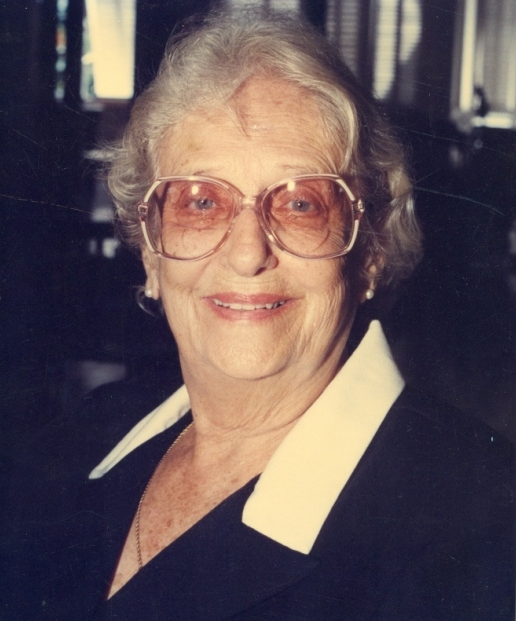

6th President of Guyana
- In office December 19, 1997 – August 11, 1999
- Prime Minister (also First Vice President): Sam Hinds; Bharrat Jagdeo
- Preceded by: Sam Hinds
- Succeeded by: Bharrat Jagdeo

6th Prime Minister and First Vice President of Guyana
- In office March 17, 1997 – December 19, 1997
- President: Sam Hinds
- Preceded by: Sam Hinds
- Succeeded by: Sam Hinds

First Lady of Guyana
- In role October 9, 1992 – March 6, 1997
- President: Cheddi Jagan
- Preceded by: Joyce Hoyte
- Succeeded by: Yvonne Hinds

Spouse of the Premier of British Guiana
- In role September 5, 1961 – December 12, 1964
- Premier: Cheddi Jagan
- Preceded by: Inaugural holder
- Succeeded by: Sheila Bernice Lataste Burnham

Spouse of the Chief Minister of British Guiana
- In Role; May 30, 1953 – October 9, 1953
- Minister: Cheddi Jagan
- Preceded by: Inaugural holder
- Succeeded by: Role abolished

Personal details
- Born: Janet Rosalie Rosenberg; October 20, 1920 Chicago, Illinois, U.S.
- Died: March 28, 2009 (aged 88) Georgetown, Guyana
- Party: People's Progressive Party
- Spouse: Cheddi Jagan (m. 1943; died 1997)
- Children: Cheddi "Joey" Jagan Jr. Nadira Jagan-Brancier
- Relatives: Suzanne Wasserman (niece)
- Nickname: Bhaujie or Bhowgie (transl. sister-in-law (brother's wife) in Guyanese Hindustani)

Janet Rosenberg Jagan OE (née Rosenberg; October 20, 1920 – March 28, 2009) was an American-born Guyanese politician who served as the 6th President of Guyana from 1997 to 1999. She was the first female president of Guyana, and the first American-born woman to serve as a head of state. She previously served as the first female Prime Minister of Guyana from 17 March 1997 to 19 December 1997. The wife of Cheddi Jagan, whom she succeeded as president, she was awarded Guyana's highest national award, the Order of Excellence, in 1993, and the UNESCO Mahatma Gandhi Gold Medal for Women's Rights in 1998.

== Early years and marriage ==
Jagan was born Janet Rosenberg on the south side of Chicago, Illinois, on October 20, 1920. Her parents, Kathryn (née Kronberg) (1895–1990) and Charles Rosenberg (1891–1957), were Jewish. She had one brother, Maurice Rosenberg (1917–2006). Her maternal grandparents, Adolph and Rosa Kronberg (née Appelbaum), were Jewish immigrants. Adolph immigrated to Chicago from Romania and Rosa came from Hungary. The Rosenberg family lived in a bungalow at 7532 S. East End Avenue in the middle-class, formerly all-white neighborhood of South Shore. In December 1942, aged 22, while working as a student nurse at Cook County Hospital, she met Cheddi Jagan, a Hindu Indo-Guyanese dentistry student at Northwestern University. They married on August 5, 1943, and in December that year she moved with him to Guyana, where he set up his dental practice.

== In Guyana ==
In Guyana, she took part in labour activism along with her husband and joined the British Guianese Labour Union. She also worked in her husband's dental clinic as a nurse for 10 years. In 1946, she founded the Women's Political and Economic Organization and co-founded the Political Affairs Committee.

== Political career ==
Janet Jagan unsuccessfully ran for a seat from Central Georgetown in the 1947 general election. On January 1, 1950, she and her husband were co-founders of the democratic socialist People's Progressive Party (PPP); Janet served as the PPP's General Secretary from 1950 to 1970. Also in 1950, Jagan was elected to the Georgetown City Council. She was subsequently elected to the House of Assembly in the April 1953 election, winning a seat from Essequibo constituency. She was one of three women to win seats in that election; following the election, she was chosen as Deputy Speaker of the Legislature.

Janet Jagan Presidential Standard

The PPP, a left-wing party, opposed British colonial rule of Guyana. After its electoral victory in April 1953, the PPP briefly formed the government, but the British government had the PPP government removed later in the year due to concerns about the Jagans' alleged communist sympathies. Leading the country for only 133 days in 1953 following the free and universal election, she and Cheddi were first deposed and then jailed in 1955 on orders of Winston Churchill who feared the existence of a communist state in the Western Hemisphere. Churchill wished to prevent the potential for the Soviet Union to form ties with the new government, though this never occurred. Cheddi and Janet remained in jail for five months; they were subsequently kept under house arrest for two years. Churchill had modified the Guyanese constitution to prevent her and Cheddi from holding the office of President or Prime Minister. In 1957, she was re-elected to the House of Assembly from Essequibo constituency and became Minister of Labour, Health and Housing. Retaining his popularity, in 1961, Cheddi was re-elected Prime Minister. Janet later succeeded Claude Christian as Minister of Home Affairs upon Christian's death in 1963, but resigned from the Cabinet in June 1964. Six weeks later she was caught up in the Freedom House bombing, where she was working as the General Secretary of the PPP. Her hand was slightly injured. As a member of the Elections Commission for the opposition in 1967, she expressed concern about the possibility of vote rigging. She was also the editor of the PPP newspaper Mirror from 1973 to 1997.

Jagan was elected to Parliament in 1973 and was re-elected in 1980, 1985, and 1992, eventually becoming the longest-serving member of Parliament (46 years). Cheddi Jagan was elected as President of Guyana in 1992, and Janet Jagan became First Lady. She represented Guyana at the United Nations for three months in 1993, temporarily replacing Rudy Insanally when the latter was President of the United Nations General Assembly.

After Cheddi Jagan's death, Janet Jagan was sworn in as Prime Minister as well as First Vice President on March 17, 1997. Jagan was the presidential candidate of the PPP in the December 1997 election. The PPP won the election, making Jagan the first female President of Guyana, as well as the country's first Jewish and first U.S.-born leader. She was also the fourth woman elected in her own right as chief executive of a country in the Western Hemisphere, after Vigdís Finnbogadóttir of Iceland, Eugenia Charles of Dominica and Violeta Chamorro of Nicaragua. She was named a Freedom hero by The My Hero Project.

== Resignation and death ==
On July 1, 1999, after Jagan returned from the European-Latin American summit in Rio de Janeiro, she was admitted to St. Joseph's Mercy Hospital in the capital, Georgetown, due to chest pains and exhaustion. She was treated for a heart condition and released from the hospital on July 3. Later in the month, she underwent tests regarding her heart condition at the Akron City Hospital in Akron, Ohio; she was discharged on July 23. Returning to Guyana, she received heart medication and was told that bypass surgery was not necessary.

Jagan resigned as President on August 8, 1999, because her health left her incapable of "vigorous, strong leadership"; she said that Finance Minister Bharrat Jagdeo would be her successor. Jagdeo was sworn in as President on August 11.

Despite her resignation, Jagan remained active in the PPP. At the PPP's 29th Congress, Jagan had received the second highest number of votes (671) in the election to the party's Central Committee, held on August 2, 2008. She was then elected to the PPP Executive Committee, in addition to being elected as editor of the PPP paper Thunder, on August 12, 2008.

Jagan later left Guyana for Maracaibo, Venezuela for treatment. She later went to Belém, Brazil for additional treatment. Janet Jagan died of an abdominal aneurysm on March 28, 2009, in Georgetown. Her body was cremated on March 31, 2009, in Guyana.

== Writings ==
In 1993, Peepal Tree Press published her When Grandpa Cheddi was a Boy and Other Stories, followed by Patricia, the Baby Manatee (1995), Anastasia the Ant-Eater (1997) and The Dog Who Loved Flowers.

Political offices
Preceded by Sam Hinds	Prime Minister of Guyana; 1997	Succeeded by Sam Hinds
Preceded by Sam Hinds	President of Guyana; 1997–1999	Succeeded by Bharrat Jagdeo
