= Bharrat Jagdeo =

President of Guyana from 1999 to 2011

The Honourable Bharrat Jagdeo
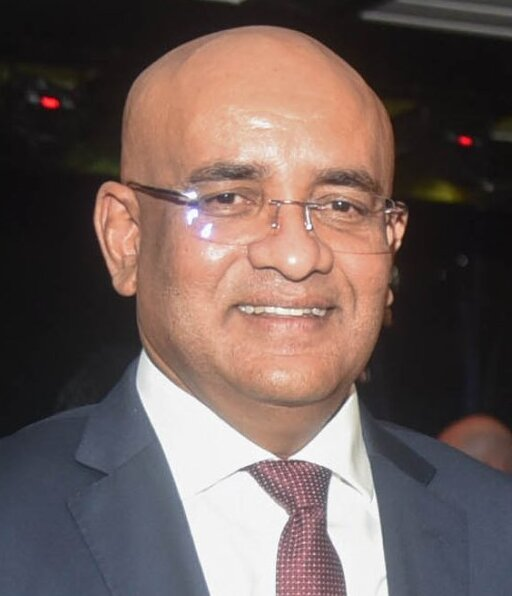
- Jagdeo in 2022

Vice President of Guyana
- Incumbent
- Assumed office 2 August 2020 Serving with Mark Phillips
- President: Irfaan Ali
- Prime Minister: Mark Phillips
- Preceded by: Carl Barrington Greenidge; Khemraj Ramjattan; Sydney Allicock
- In office 19 December 1997 – 9 August 1999 Serving with Sam Hinds
- President: Janet Jagan
- Preceded by: Janet Jagan; Reepu Daman Persaud
- Succeeded by: Reepu Daman Persaud

7th President of Guyana
- In office 11 August 1999 – 3 December 2011
- Vice President: Reepu Daman Persaud
- Prime Minister (also First Vice President): Sam Hinds
- Preceded by: Janet Jagan
- Succeeded by: Donald Ramotar

7th Prime Minister and First Vice President of Guyana
- In office 9 August 1999 – 11 August 1999
- President: Janet Jagan
- Preceded by: Sam Hinds
- Succeeded by: Sam Hinds

President pro tempore of the Union of South American Nations
- In office 26 November 2010 – 29 October 2011
- Preceded by: Rafael Correa
- Succeeded by: Fernando Lugo

Personal details
- Born: 23 January 1964 (age 62) Unity Village, Demerara-Mahaica, British Guiana (present-day Guyana)
- Party: People's Progressive Party/Civic
- Spouse: Varshnie Singh (m. 1998; div. 2007) (Note: Married under Hindu rites, however never legally registered.)
- Children: 2
- Education: Patrice Lumumba University

Bharrat Jagdeo (born 23 January 1964) is a Guyanese politician who has been serving as Vice President of Guyana since 2020, in the administration of President Irfaan Ali. He had previously also held the office from 1997 until 1999, during the presidency of Janet Jagan. Jagdeo subsequently served as the President of Guyana from 11 August 1999 to 3 December 2011. He also holds a number of global leadership positions in the areas of sustainable development, green growth and climate change.

Jagdeo, a member of the People's Progressive Party/Civic (PPP/C), served as Minister of Finance from 1995 to 1999, becoming president in 1999 after Janet Jagan resigned for health reasons. Subsequently, he won two elections, in 2001 and 2006. He was the first and youngest President of Guyana to relinquish office in accordance with term limits he signed into the Guyanese Constitution.

Following the PPP/C's electoral defeat in 2015 Jagdeo became Leader of the Opposition in the National Assembly. Furthermore, when the PPP/C returned to power in 2020, Jagdeo was sworn in as a vice president in the administration of president Irfaan Ali. Vice News alleged that it had uncovered corruption by Jagdeo and several Chinese businessmen. These allegations were rejected by Jagdeo who pointed out instead, that the Vice News documentary failed to provide irrefutable evidence to substantiate its claims and it mostly relied on hearsay and comments by a Chinese businessman Su Zhi Rong against whom he has filed a defamation lawsuit.

== Early and personal life ==
Jagdeo was born in Unity Village in Demerara-Mahaica, in then British Guiana in 1964 to Hindu Indian parents. In 1912, his grandfather, Ram Jiyawan had immigrated under the Indian indenture system to British Guiana from the village of Pure Thakurain in the Amethi district of the Awadh region of the United Provinces in British India (present-day state of Uttar Pradesh in India). During a visit to India, Jagdeo went to his ancestral village and found that a community of salt makers, called Nonia, was the community which his ancestors belonged to. Jagdeo joined the youth wing of the People's Progressive Party (PPP), the Progressive Youth Organisation, when he was 13, and became a member of the PPP itself at age 16. He subsequently rose to local leadership positions in the party.

He attended Bygeval Multilateral High School before migrating to Russia in 1984 for higher studies. After obtaining a master's degree in economics from Patrice Lumumba Peoples' Friendship University in Moscow in 1990, Jagdeo returned to Guyana and worked as an economist in the State Planning Secretariat until the PPP-Civic election victory in the October 1992 election. After this he became Special Advisor to the Minister of Finance.

Jagdeo was appointed as Junior Minister of Finance in October 1993, and a few weeks later, at the PPP's 24th Congress, he was elected to the party's Central Committee. He later became a member of the executive committee of the PPP. In the Cabinet, he was promoted to Senior Minister of Finance in May 1995. In December 1997, he was appointed as the Second Vice President.

In 1998, Jagdeo married Varshnie Singh in a Hindu wedding ceremony. However, the union was never legally registered. The couple ended their marriage in 2007. Singh had accused Jagdeo of domestic violence, with Jagdeo refuting her allegations. Singh later clarified she suffered "institutionalized, verbal, emotional, and psychological abuse" by Jagdeo.

== Prime Minister and President ==
On 8 August 1999, Janet Jagan announced that she was resigning as president for health reasons, and that Jagdeo would be her successor. Because the Prime Minister is the President's legal successor, Jagdeo took office as Prime Minister on 9 August, so that he would be positioned to succeed Jagan. He was then sworn in as president on 11 August. At age 35, he was one of the youngest heads of state in the world.

Jagdeo was re-elected for another five-year term on 28 August 2006, with the PPP garnering 54.6 percent of the votes. It expanded its majority, by two, to 36 seats in the 65-member parliament. He was sworn in for another term on 2 September.

At the PPP's 29th Congress, Jagdeo received the highest number of votes (777) in the election to the party's Central Committee, held on 2 August 2008. He was then elected to the PPP Executive Committee on 12 August 2008.

In late 2011, his term of office officially came to an end as a result of the term limit amendment to the Constitution, piloted by his government, and signed into law by himself, which created a two-term limit for anyone elected president after 2000. He was succeeded by PPP/C presidential candidate Donald Ramotar, who was elected president in the 28 November 2011 general elections. Under the Constitution, President Jagdeo's term officially ended on 3 December 2011, when Ramotar took the presidential oath of office.

== Initiatives ==
During Jagdeo's tenure as president, major economic and social reforms were initiated in Guyana. When he relinquished office, Guyana had experienced five consecutive years of strong economic growth, often out-pacing other South American countries. External debt had been almost halved, and reserves had almost tripled compared to the 2006 situation. During the presidency, investments had been made in social services which resulted in improved access to education. The housing sector saw its biggest expansion in its history. Road, river and air transport infrastructure were improved.

In 2003, in his role as Lead Head of Government for Agriculture in the Caribbean Community, Jagdeo spearheaded a process (known as the "Jagdeo Initiative") to create a more competitive and sustainable agricultural sector in the region by 2015.

In his final term as president, President Jagdeo became a global advocate for international action to avert the worst extremes of climate change, and was described by the Chairman of the Intergovernmental Panel on Climate Change, Rajendra K. Pachauri, as "one of perhaps half a dozen Heads of Government who truly understands the issue". In line with the President's global advocacy, Guyana's Low Carbon Development Strategy sets out a national scale, replicable model to protect Guyana's 18 million hectare forest, to address the 17% of global greenhouse gas emissions that result from deforestation and forest degradation, and re-orient the Guyanese economy onto a long-term "low deforestation, low carbon, climate resilient trajectory".

As part of building this global model, Norway is partnering with Guyana to provide up to US$250 million, by 2015, for avoided greenhouse gas emissions from Guyana's forest. Guyana is using these payments and domestic resources to attract private investment to opportunities in clean energy and new low carbon economic sectors, as well as to make significant public investments in other social and economic priorities. This has been described by the Climate & Development Knowledge Network, the UK-based climate policy network, as "maybe the most progressive low carbon development strategy in a low income country."

Jagdeo was a signatory to the UNASUR Constitutive Treaty of the Union of South American Nations in May 2008. Guyana has ratified the treaty. In November 2009, Jagdeo hosted the heads of government of South America in Georgetown, at his one-year anniversary of the pro tempore presidency of UNASUR.

On 26 November 2011, Jagdeo made a far-reaching farewell address ahead of the nation's elections on 28 November 2011. He spoke of accomplishments, such as the economy and defense issues, and emphasised his optimism in the future of Guyana.

== Corruption and greenwashing allegations ==
In June 2020, Vice News conducted a six-week investigation into allegations of bribery, greenwashing and corruption against Jagdeo. Specifically, their report focused on the relationship between Jagdeo and Chinese investment in mining and energy projects that were at odds with the nation's and Jagdeo's pledges to address the Climate crisis and Biodiversity crisis. The documentary investigation showed undercover footage of Mr Jagdeo seeming to accept bribes although without wanting to know the details of the deal which he was entering, with Su Zhi Rong dealing with the particularities.

In an interview with Vice News and several national papers, Jagdeo rejected allegations of corruption and claimed instead that the Vice News documentary failed to provide first-hand evidence of corrupt transactions as it mostly relied on hear-say and comments by Chinese Businessman, Su Zhi Rong against whom he has filed a defamation lawsuit.

== Honours ==
Jagdeo has been conferred with honorary doctorates of the Peoples' Friendship University of Russia, TERI University, the University of Central Lancashire and Trent University.

Jagdeo was awarded the Pushkin Medal by the Government of Russia.

In April 2013, Jagdeo was conferred with the highest honour of the State of Roraima, Brazil, the Order of Merit 'Forte Sao Joaquim'.

== Awards and honours ==
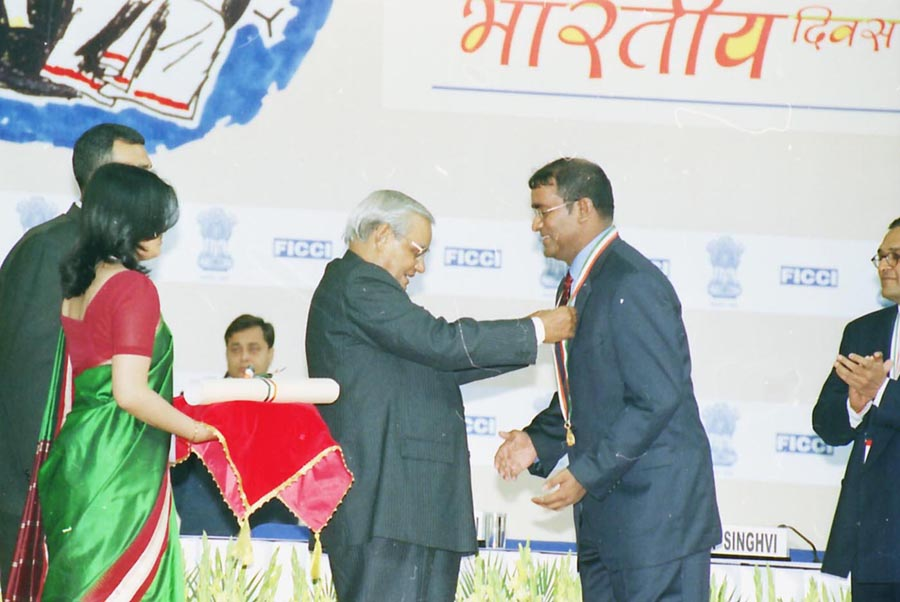
Bharat Jagdeo receives Pravasi Bharatiya Samman from the then Prime Minister of India, Atal Bihari Vajpayee, in 2004

  (India)
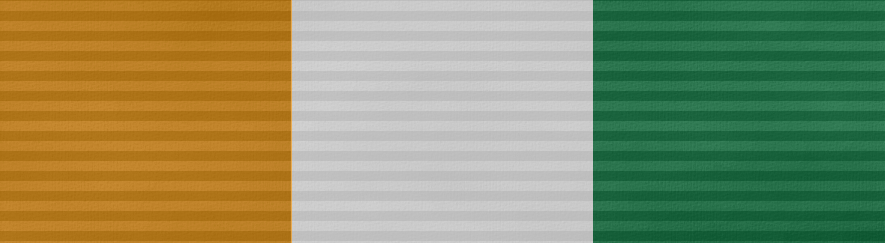
  - Pravasi Bharatiya Samman

In 2004 he received the Pravasi Bharatiya Samman from the President of India in the field of public affairs.

== International profile and post-presidency career ==
President Jagdeo was elected as chairman of the Board of Governors of the International Monetary Fund and World Bank in September 2005. He occupied this position until September 2006.

Time magazine named Jagdeo as one of their "Heroes of the Environment" in 2008, and he was awarded the United Nations "Champion of the Earth" award in 2010.

In early 2010, the Secretary General of the United Nations asked Jagdeo to serve on the Secretary General's High Level Advisory Group on Climate Financing.

Jagdeo is a Patron of the Delhi-based World Sustainable Development Forum.

In 2011, Heads of State and other leaders from the world's rainforest countries asked him to be "Roving Ambassador for the Three Basins" (Amazon, Congo Basin, South East Asia).

In March 2012, the world's largest and oldest environmental organisation, the International Union for Conservation of Nature (IUCN), announced that President Jagdeo would become the IUCN High Level Envoy for Sustainable Development in Forest Countries and an IUCN Patron of Nature.

Jagdeo is also the President of the Assembly of the Korea-based Global Green Growth Institute (GGGI), having been a Founding Board Member of GGGI since 2010. GGGI is the world's newest international organization, and has 20 Member States.

In June 2013, Commonwealth Secretary-General Kamalesh Sharma announced that former President Jagdeo would lead a high-level team of experts to identify solutions for unlocking resources to enable small, poor and climate-vulnerable Commonwealth countries to combat climate change. The former president was joined by eight others to create a set of recommendations for the international community to help identify practical solutions for those countries most vulnerable to climate change. Jagdeo presented the report to the 53 Heads of Government and other leaders of the Commonwealth, representing about a fifth of the world's population at the 2014 Commonwealth Heads of Government Meeting (CHOGM) in Colombo, Sri Lanka.

Jagdeo travelled from the 2015 CHOGM to the United Nations Framework Convention on Climate Change summit in Warsaw where he spoke of the outcomes of CHOGM and the need for continued leadership from Prime Ministers and Presidents. In a major speech in Warsaw, he stated: "The world has committed to finalising a legally binding climate agreement by 2015 – that is now just two years away. If we are to have a chance of averting catastrophic climate change, climate change has to become a Heads of Government issue between now and then. Leaving it to Environment Ministers or officials will be inadequate. That is why I fully support Secretary General Ban Ki-moon’s plans for a Climate Summit in New York next year."

He has been a Special Ambassador to the FAO for Forests and the Environment (an FAO Goodwill Ambassador) since 2016.

In March 2013, the ACP Council of Ministers inaugurated a 14-member Eminent Persons Group (EPG) whose mission will be to provide guidance and concrete recommendations for the future of the ACP Group. The 14 members of the group who met in Brussels designated the former Nigerian President, Chief Olusegun Obasanjo, as their chairperson, with Jagdeo designated as one of two Vice Chairs.

Jagdeo has been a guest lecturer at Columbia University (New York City, USA), York University (Toronto, Canada), Trent University (Peterborough, Canada), the University of Toronto, United Nations University (Tokyo, Japan), and the University of the West Indies. He has also taken part in Trent University's Carbon Conversation, focusing on the need to de-carbonize the global economy.

=== Leader of the Opposition ===
Following the PPP's defeat in the May 2015 general election, Jagdeo was included in the list of the PPP's 32 MPs. He was sworn in as Leader of the Opposition in the National Assembly on 17 August 2015.

=== Vice president ===
In March 2020, the PPP won the 2020 Guyanese general election, but an attempt was made by the incumbent APNU+AFC government to stay in power illegally. Jagdeo was to the fore of domestic and international efforts to protect the democratic process, and see a peaceful transition of power. The support of the US Government (who placed sanctions on several members of the incumbent Government), and others, resulted in the swearing in of Irfaan Ali as president.

After the PPP regained the presidency, President Ali swore in Jagdeo as the first Vice President on 3 August 2020.

Political offices
Preceded by Sam Hinds	Prime Minister of Guyana; 1999	Succeeded by Sam Hinds
Preceded by Janet Jagan	President of Guyana; 1999–2011	Succeeded by Donald Ramotar
Diplomatic posts
Preceded by Rafael Correa	President pro tempore of the Union of South American Nations; 2010–2011	Succeeded by Fernando Lugo
