= 2006 Guyanese general election =

- 28 August 2006

All 65 seats in the National Assembly 33 seats needed for a majority
- Registered: 492,369
- Turnout: 69.34% (▼22.38pp)
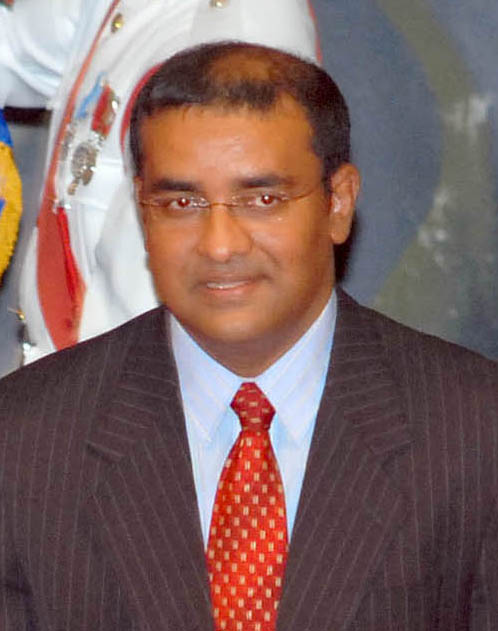

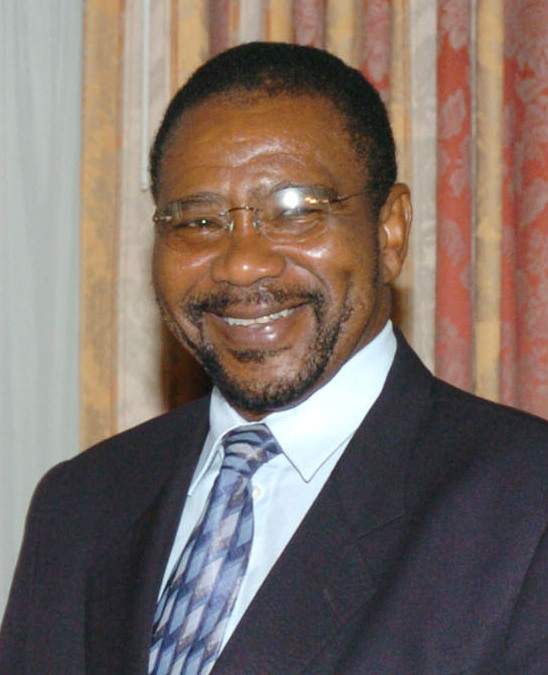

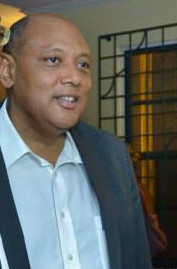
	First party	Second party	Third party
Candidate	Bharrat Jagdeo	Robert Corbin	Raphael Trotman
Party	PPP/C	PNCR-1G	AFC
Last election	52.96%, 34 seats	41.83%, 27 seats	Did not exist
Seats won	36	22	5
Seat change	▲2	▼5	New
Popular vote	183,887	114,608	28,366
Percentage	54.67%	34.07%	8.43%
Swing	▲1.71pp	▼7.76pp	New
- Results by district
President before election
Bharrat Jagdeo
PPP/C
Elected President
Bharrat Jagdeo
PPP/C

General elections were held in Guyana on 28 August 2006. They were initially scheduled for 4 August, but were moved to 28 August after President Jagdeo dissolved the National Assembly on 2 May. The result was a victory for the ruling People's Progressive Party/Civic (PPP/C), which won 36 of the 65 seats in the National Assembly.

== Electoral system ==
The 65 members of the National Assembly were elected by closed list proportional representation in two groups; 25 members were elected from the 10 electoral districts based on the regions, and 40 elected from a single nationwide constituency. Seats were allocated using the Hare quota.

The President was elected by a first-past-the-post double simultaneous vote system, whereby each list nominated a presidential candidate and the presidential election itself was won by the candidate of the list having a plurality.

There were a total of 1999 polling places, open from 06:00 to 18:00, and election day was declared a national holiday to encourage voter turnout.

== Campaign ==
The PPP/C of incumbent President Bharrat Jagdeo was ahead in the opinion polls and was expected to keep its majority in the National Assembly. The main campaign topics were crime, drugs and the economy.

== Conduct ==
Observation teams from the Organization of American States (OAS), the Caribbean Community (CARICOM), the Commonwealth Observer Group, and the Carter Center attended the elections. Troops patrolled the streets in order to prevent violence.

== Results ==
Party	Presidential candidate	Votes	%	Seats			
Party	Presidential candidate	Votes	%	Constituency	Top-up	Total	+/–
People's Progressive Party/Civic	Bharrat Jagdeo	183,887	54.67	15	21	36	+2
People's National Congress Reform–One Guyana	Robert Corbin	114,608	34.07	9	13	22	–5
Alliance for Change	Raphael Trotman	28,366	8.43	1	4	5	New
Guyana Action Party–ROAR	Chandra N. Sharma	4,249	1.26	0	1	1	–2
The United Force	Manzoor Nadir	2,694	0.80	0	1	1	+1
Justice for All Party	Paul Hardy	2,571	0.76	0	0	0	0
Total		336,375	100.00	25	40	65	0
Valid votes		336,375	98.52				
Invalid/blank votes		5,051	1.48				
Total votes		341,426	100.00				
Registered voters/turnout		492,369	69.34				
Source: EAB, Guyana News and Information

=== Elected members ===
Alliance for Change	Guyana Action Party–ROAR	People's National Congress Reform	People's Progressive Party/Civic	The United Force
Raphael Trotman; Kehmraj Ramjattan; Sheila Holder; David Patterson	Everall Franklin	Anna Ally; Deborah Backer; Lance Carberry; Robert Corbin; Volda Lawrence; James McAllister; Winston Murray; George Norton; Clarissa Riehl; Keith Scott; Africo Selmon Friendship; Anthony Vieria; Basil Williams	Irfaan Ali; Frank Anthony; Shaik Baksh; Brindley Benn; Indranie Chandarpal; Desrey Fox; Henry Jeffrey; Kellawan Lall; Odinga Lumumba; Moses Nagamootoo; Mohabir Nandall; Harry Nawbatt; Haripersaud Nokta; Maniram Prashad; Donald Ramotar; Beri Ramsaran; Clement Rohee; Philomena Sahoye-Shury; Dharamkumar Seeraj; Gail Teixeira; Jennifer Webster	Manzoor Nadir
Source: The Official Gazette

== Aftermath ==
By virtue of being the leader of the party winning the most seats, PPP/C leader Bharrat Jagdeo was re-elected as President. He was sworn in on 9 September. The National Assembly met for the first time on 28 September, with Ralph Ramkarran re-elected as Speaker.
