= Guyana (1966–1970) =

Constitutional monarchy period of Guyana

- 1966–1970
- Flag Coat of arms
- Motto: "One people, one nation, one destiny"
- Anthem: "Dear Land of Guyana, of Rivers and Plains"
- Capital: Georgetown
- Common languages: Official; English; Vernacular language Guyanese Creole Native languages: Akawaio; Macushi; Waiwai; Arawakan family; Patamona; Warrau; Carib; Wapishana; Arekuna; Other languages: Guyanese Hindustani; Portuguese; Dutch; Spanish; French; Chinese; Tamil; Skepi Creole Dutch; Berbice Creole Dutch
- Government: Unitary parliamentary constitutional monarchy
- Queen
  - 1966–1970: Elizabeth II
- Governor-General
  - 1966: Richard Luyt
  - 1966–1969: David Rose
  - 1969–1970: Edward Luckhoo
- Prime Minister
  - 1966–1970: Forbes Burnham
- History
  - Independence: 26 May 1966
  - Republic: 23 February 1970
- Currency: Guyanese dollar
Preceded by	Succeeded by
British Guiana	Co-operative Republic of Guyana
- Today part of: Guyana

Guyana was a predecessor to the modern-day Co-operative Republic of Guyana and an independent state that existed between 1966 and 1970.

== History ==
British rule ended on 26 May 1966 when Guyana was given independence from the United Kingdom by the Guyana Independence Act 1966, which transformed British Guiana into an independent sovereign state, with Elizabeth II as Queen of Guyana. The monarch's constitutional roles were mostly delegated to her representative Governor-General of Guyana. Forbes Burnham held office as the prime minister (and head of government) of Guyana during this period.

The Co-operative Republic of Guyana was formed on 23 February 1970 when Guyana became a republic in the Commonwealth.

Following the abolition of the monarchy, former Governor-General Sir Edward Luckhoo provisionally became the de facto acting head of state of Guyana.

== Governors-general ==
The following governors-general held office:

1. Sir Richard Luyt (26 May 1966–16 December 1966)
2. Sir David Rose (16 December 1966–10 November 1969)
3. Sir Edward Luckhoo (10 November 1969–1 July 1970)
