= Désirée Bernard =

Guyanese lawyer and jurist

Chief Justice of Guyana
- In office 1996–2001

Personal details
- Born: 2 March 1939 Georgetown, British Guiana (now Guyana)
- Died: 28 March 2024 (aged 85) Trinidad and Tobago
- Education: University of London (LL.B.)

Désirée Patricia Bernard (2 March 1939 – 28 March 2024) was a Guyanese lawyer and jurist who was the country's first female judge of the High Court in 1980 and Justice of Appeal of the Supreme Court in 1992. She was appointed Chief Justice of Guyana in 1996, Chancellor of the Judiciary of Guyana and the Caribbean in 2001 and a Judge of the Caribbean Court of Justice in 2005. In 2014, she was appointed to the Bermuda Court of Appeal.

== Early life and education ==
Bernard was born in Georgetown on 2 March 1939, the only child of William and Maude Bernard. Her father was a Sergeant of Police. She attended St Ambrose School in Georgetown and won a place at Bishops High School. She planned to become a teacher, until a family friend encouraged her to consider law. She attained a Bachelor of Laws degree with honours from the University of London in 1963.

== Career ==
Bernard qualified as a solicitor in 1964 and was in private practice until 1980. She was appointed a Magistrate in 1970 and a Commissioner of Oaths and Notary Public in 1976. In 1977, she was admitted to the English Roll of Solicitors.

Bernard was appointed as the first female Judge in the High Court of Guyana in 1980, and the first female Justice of Appeal in 1992. In 1996, she was appointed Chief Justice of Guyana. She later became Chancellor and Head of the Judiciary of Guyana. In 1997, she ruled that Janet Jagan had the constitutional right to be President after the election was challenged in court.

Bernard served as a Justice of the Caribbean Court of Justice from its establishment in 2005, the court's only female justice, until her retirement in 2014. The Court held a special sitting to mark her retirement, with the Chancellor of the Judiciary, Carl Singh, saying that her legal career "blazed the path for women in Guyana and Caribbean" and Caricom Secretary General Irwin LaRocque saying that she had set an "awe-inspiring example" with her consistent concern for women and her contributions to principles of law and procedure such that she "has enriched the legal and social fabric of our community."

In 2011, Bernard was appointed as a judge of the Inter-American Development Bank Administrative Tribunal in Washington, D.C. In December 2014, she was appointed to the Bermuda Court of Appeal by Governor George Fergusson.

Bernard was founding Secretary of the Caribbean Women's Association, serving from 1970 until 1974, and the first, and only female, President of the Organisation of Commonwealth Bar Associations in 1976. In 1981, she was appointed chair of a committed to examine all laws with a view to abolishing discrimination against women, leading to the abolishment of several laws and the repeal of the Bastardly Act. In 1987, she founded the Guyana Association of Women Lawyers. She was involved in the formation of the Georgetown Legal Aid Clinic and chairs its Board for many years. She was also President of the Georgetown Toastmistress Club and a member of numerous associations including the Guyana Consumers Association, the Council of the University of Guyana, the Guyana Adoption Board and the Guyana Girl Guides Association.

Bernard was a rapporteur of the United Nations Committee on the Elimination of Discrimination from 1982 until 1984, and then Chair of the Committee from 1985 until 1989.

Bernard has written articles on gender and legal issues. In 2013, she completed research on the "Compatibility of the Caribbean Court of Justice with the Revised Treaty of Chaguaramas" after receiving a fellowship from the Institute of Advanced Legal Studies in London.

== Awards and honours ==
Bernard has received two of Guyana's three highest national awards, the Cacique's Crown of Honour and the Order of Roraima. In 2005, she received the CARICOM Triennial Award for Women for her role in advocating for women's development.

In 1989, Bernard was awarded the University of Guyana Award for Achievement in Law. In 2007, she was given an honorary Doctor of Laws by the University of the West Indies. In October 2017, she was honoured in New York City by the Guyana-Jamaica Friendship Association.

== Personal life ==
Bernard was single and had an adopted daughter, Carol, who is a lawyer in Trinidad and Tobago. She was a Christian and was the first woman to be Chancellor of the Anglican Diocese of Guyana.

== Publications ==
- Bernard, D (1996), The Work of the Committee on the Elimination of Discrimination against Women: Its Focus on Nationality, Custom, Culture and the Rights of the Girl-Child, Byrnes, Connors, and Bik, pp. 72–85, doi:10.14217/9781848596115-10-en (inactive 1 July 2025)
- Bernard, Desiree (1996), The Synergy of" Rights" Conventions: The Convention on the Elimination of All Forms of Discrimination Against Women (CEDAW), the Convention on the Rights of the Child (CRC), the Inter-American Convention on the Prevention, Punishment and Eradication of Violence Against Women (The Convention of Belem do Para), United Nations
- Bernard, Désirée (2006), Confronting Gender-based Violence in the Caribbean, Centre for Gender and Development Studies, Mona Unit
- Bernard, Desiree Patricia (2007). "The First 12 years". In Hanna Beate Schöpp-Schilling; Cees Flinterman (eds.). The circle of empowerment: twenty-five years of the UN Committee on the Elimination of Discrimination against Women. New York: The Feminist Press. pp. 266–267. ISBN 9781558615649.
- Bernard, Désirée (2009). "The Caribbean Court of Justice: A New Judicial Experience". International Journal of Legal Information. 37 (2): 219–238. doi:10.1017/S0731126500005229.
