= Derek Jagan =

Guyanese politician and lawyer

The Honourable Derek Jagan OR CCH SC JP MP

Speaker of the National Assembly of Guyana
- In office 17 December 1992 – 15 October 2000
- Preceded by: Sase Narain
- Succeeded by: Martin Zephyr

Personal details
- Born: 25 May 1930 Port Mourant, Berbice, British Guiana (present-day East Berbice-Corentyne, Guyana)
- Died: 15 October 2000 (aged 70) Georgetown, Guyana
- Party: People's Progressive Party
- Spouse: Roshenara Gajraj
- Relatives: Cheddi Jagan (brother); Janet Jagan (sister-in-law); Cheddi "Joey" Jagan Jr. (nephew)
- Occupation: Lawyer, politician

Derek Chunilall Jagan (25 May 1930 – 15 October 2000) was a Guyanese politician and lawyer. He served as Speaker of the National Assembly of Guyana from 1992 to 2000. He died of an apparent heart attack while doing yard work in 2000. He was the younger brother of former Guyanese president Cheddi Jagan.

In the early 1960s, Jagan was monitored by the British government during the Cold War.

Jagan was elected (PPP/C) was elected speaker 17 December 1992. Upon his death, he was replaced by Winslow Martin Zephyr.
