= Queen of Guyana =

Elizabeth II's reign in Guyana from 1966 to 1970

- Coat of arms of Guyana

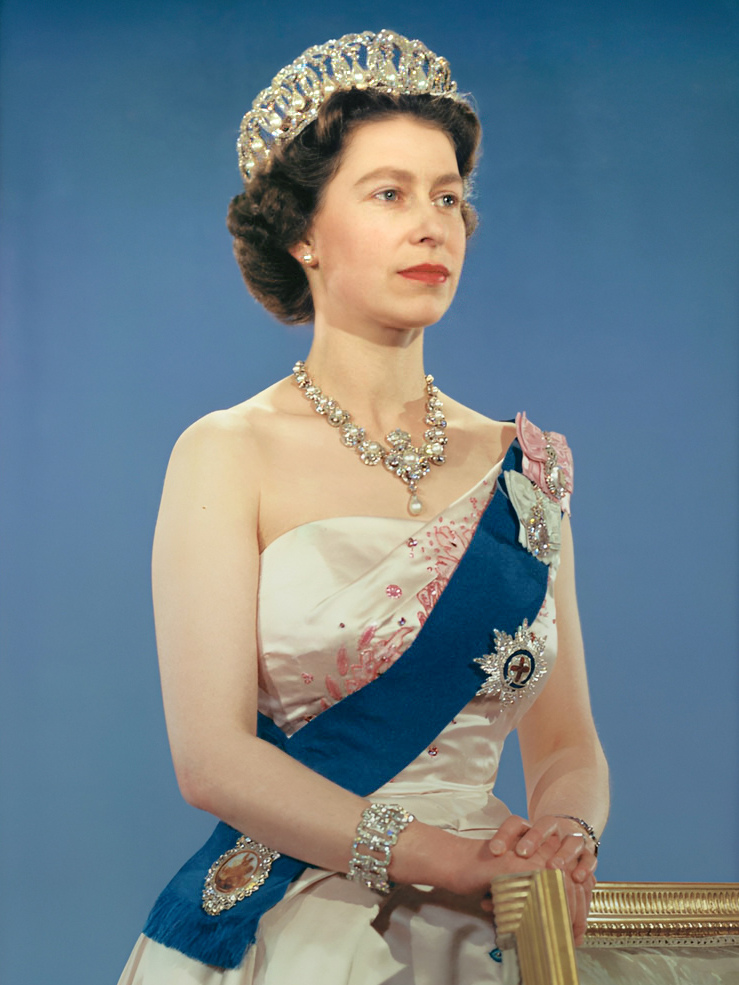
- Elizabeth II

Details
- Style: Her Majesty
- Formed: 26 May 1966
- Abolished: 23 February 1970

Elizabeth II was Queen of Guyana from 1966 to 1970, when Guyana was an independent sovereign state with a constitutional monarchy. She was also the sovereign of the other Commonwealth realms, including the United Kingdom. Her constitutional roles were delegated to the governor-general of Guyana.

On 23 February 1970, 45 months after independence, Guyana became a republic within the Commonwealth, with a president as head of state.

== History ==
We have come to the end of the road of colonial rule, and not without significance to our minds is the fact that Her Gracious Majesty, Queen of the United Kingdom is Queen of Guyana. Our association with the Crown, our membership of the Commonwealth, are matters of free and untrammelled choice by the representatives of the people of Guyana.

— Prime Minister Forbes Burnham on Independence Day 1966

The Guyana Independence Act 1966, passed by the Parliament of the United Kingdom, transformed the Crown colony of British Guiana into a sovereign state called Guyana on 26 May 1966, with Queen Elizabeth II as head of state and Queen of Guyana. The Duke of Kent represented the Queen at the independence celebrations. On Independence Day, Governor Sir Richard Luyt was sworn in as the country's first governor-general. The Duke of Kent opened the first session of the National Assembly, on behalf of the Queen, and gave the Speech from the Throne. The Duke presented the instruments of independence to Prime Minister Forbes Burnham, formally declaring the country independent. The Queen sent the following message to the people of Guyana:

I have entrusted to my cousin, the Duke of Kent, the duty of acting as my representative at the celebrations of the independence of your country.

My husband and I recall with pleasure the kindliness and the warmth of the welcome we received from the people of Guyana during our visit to you earlier this year. The memory of that happy experience enables us to picture the enthusiasm with which you will now be celebrating your country's independence.

It is with especial pleasure that I welcome you to the Commonwealth of Nations.

My thoughts are with you today. I send you my good wishes and I pray that God may bless and guide you throughout the coming years.

== Constitutional role ==
Guyanese state leaders (1966–1970)
Monarch	Elizabeth II
Governor-General	Sir Richard Luyt (1966)
Governor-General	Sir David Rose (1966–1969)
Governor-General	Sir Edward Luckhoo (1969–1970)
Prime Minister	Forbes Burnham
See List of heads of state of Guyana for details of heads of state after 1970

Guyana was one of the realms of the Commonwealth of Nations that shared the same person as sovereign and head of state.

Effective with the Guyana Independence Act 1966, no British government minister could advise the sovereign on any matters pertaining to Guyana, meaning that on all matters of Guyana, the monarch was advised solely by Guyanese ministers. The monarch was represented in the country by the governor-general of Guyana, who was appointed by the monarch on the advice of the Guyanese prime minister.

By virtue of his office, the governor-general was also the commander-in-chief of Guyana's armed forces.

=== Executive ===
The flag of the governor-general featuring St Edward's Crown

All executive powers of Guyana were vested in the monarch, but were mostly exercised by the governor-general on her behalf.

One of the main duties of the governor-general was to appoint a prime minister, who thereafter headed the Cabinet and advised the governor-general on how to execute their executive powers over all aspects of government operations and foreign affairs. The monarch's, and thereby the viceroy's role was almost entirely symbolic and cultural, acting as a symbol of the legal authority under which all governments and agencies operate. The governor-general was kept fully informed by the prime minister of the general conduct of the government of Guyana. The prime minister was responsible for furnishing the governor-general any information he requested with respect to any matter relating to the government of Guyana. The constitution also allowed the governor-general to unilaterally use reserve powers in relation to the dismissal of a prime minister, dissolution of parliament, and removal of a judge in exceptional, constitutional crisis situations.

The governor-general, to maintain the stability of government, appointed as prime minister the individual most likely to maintain the support of the National Assembly. The governor-general additionally appointed a Cabinet, at the direction of the prime minister, consisting of the prime minister and other ministers, which had the general direction and control of the government of Guyana and were collectively responsible to Parliament.

Members of various executive agencies and other officials were appointed by the governor-general, including the appointment of the leader of the opposition, the attorney-general of Guyana, parliamentary secretaries, the ombudsman, chairman of the Elections Commission, and members of the Public Service Commission.

=== Parliament ===
The sovereign, along with the National Assembly, was one of the two components of the Parliament of Guyana.

All laws in Guyana were enacted only with the governor-general's granting of Royal Assent in the monarch's name. The governor-general additionally summoned, prorogued, and dissolved parliament; after the latter, the writs for a general election were usually dropped by the governor-general.

Every new parliamentary session was marked by an address from the governor-general, in which he outlined the government's legislative agenda.

=== Courts ===
All judges of the Supreme Court of Judicature, consisting of a Court of Appeal and a High Court, were appointed by the governor-general.

The highest court of appeal for Guyana was the Judicial Committee of the Privy Council.

The governor-general, on behalf of the monarch, could also grant immunity from prosecution, exercise the royal prerogative of mercy, and pardon offences against the Crown, either before, during, or after a trial.

== Royal style and titles ==
Shortly after independence, Elizabeth II, at the request of the Prime Minister of Guyana, adopted separate and distinct style and titles in her role as Queen of Guyana. By a royal proclamation, later published in the Official Gazette of Guyana in June 1966, the Queen's style and titles in relation to Guyana became: Elizabeth the Second, by the Grace of God, Queen of Guyana and of Her other Realms and Territories, Head of the Commonwealth.

== Abolition ==
Guyana's path to independence was unusual, because its constitution, while establishing it as a Commonwealth realm, allowed for a future transition to a republic. This provision, agreed upon despite Colonial Office reservations, was a compromise to maintain the Burnham-D'Aguiar coalition. Sir Hilton Poynton, permanent under-secretary of state for the Colonies, noted that "the most powerful argument" for accepting the arrangement was that it represented a compromise between Burnham's republican instincts and D'Aguiar's desire to retain the monarchy. The Queen herself was unperturbed by the proposal. Her private secretary told Poynton, "Her Majesty's comment was that if a country fully intended to become a Republic after Independence, there was something to be said for including provisions in the constitution to regulate when this was to take place." He later mentioned that the Queen "had been rather attracted by the idea".

The provision, agreed to at the 1965 Independence Conference, enabled a change to republican status to be made by the House of Assembly passing a resolution moved by the prime minister and supported by a majority of all members of the House. Notice of this motion could, however, only be given by the prime minister on or after 1 January 1969, and three further months needed to elapse before the passing of the resolution. In speaking in support of this motion, which was debated in the National Assembly in August 1969, Prime Minister Forbes Burnham said:

In the first place, though we accept the fact that Her Gracious Majesty Queen Elizabeth II is Queen of Guyana merely titularly and exercises no executive powers within her Dominion of Guyana, though we accept the fact that Her Majesty's representative the Governor-General performs his duties in the name of Her Majesty the Queen but again on the advice, which has to be taken, of the elected Ministers of the Government, one must confess that looking at the history of Guyana, looking at our own former connection to a relationship with the United Kingdom, a natural fulfilment of our history should be the cutting of even formal ties with the Queen or the Royal House of Great Britain.

The National Assembly passed the resolution by an overwhelming majority, and resolved that the country become a republic on 23 February 1970, the anniversary of the 1763 Berbice Rebellion. 45 months after independence, Guyana became a republic within the Commonwealth, with a president as head of state.

== Royal visits ==
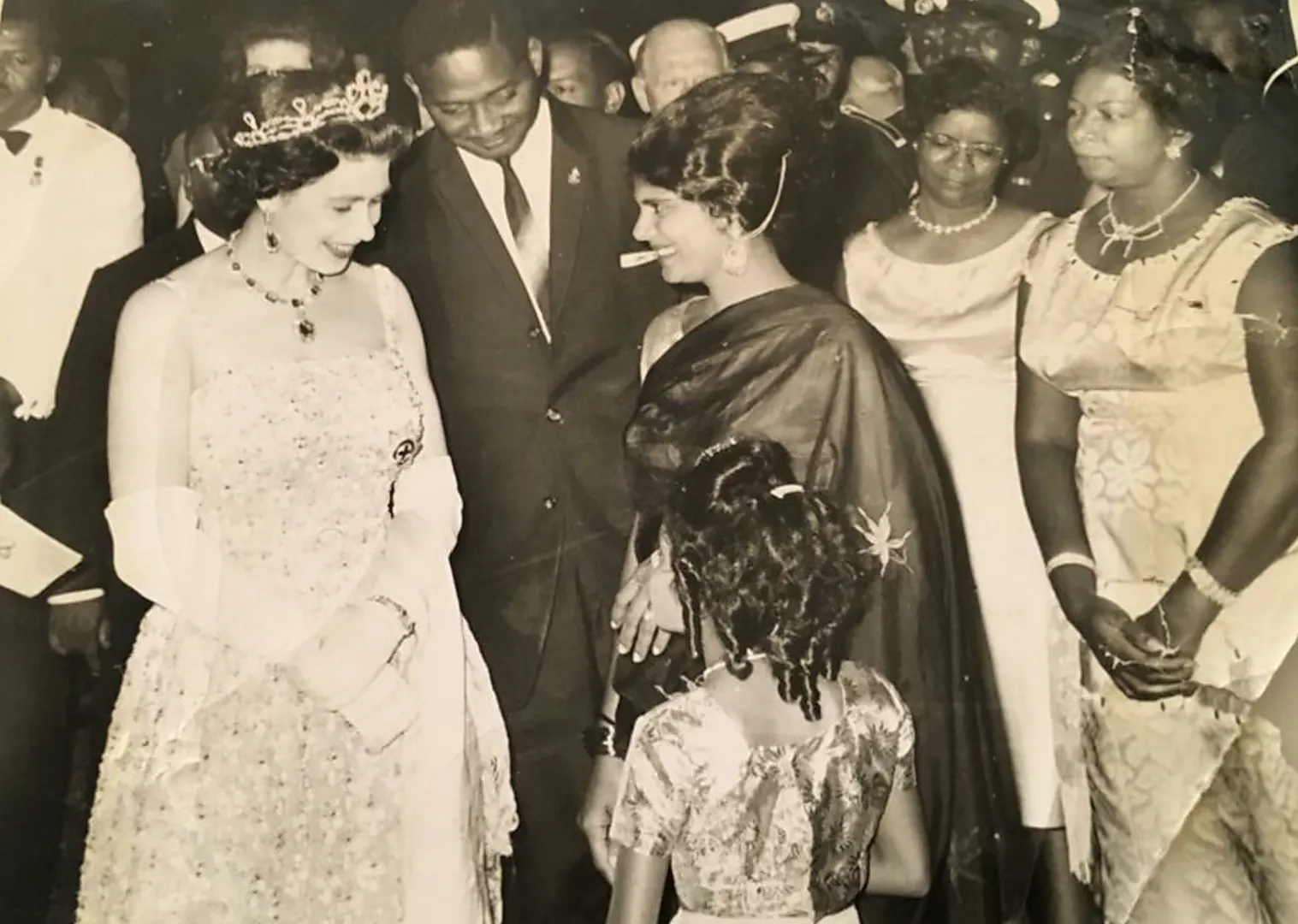
The Queen during her visit to British Guiana, February 1966

The Queen visited British Guiana from 4 to 5 February 1966, where she opened the Queen Elizabeth II National Park (now Guyana National Park). She toured the Co-operative Republic of Guyana as Head of the Commonwealth from 19 to 22 February 1994.
