= Priya Manickchand =

Guyanese politician

Priya Devi Manickchand MP
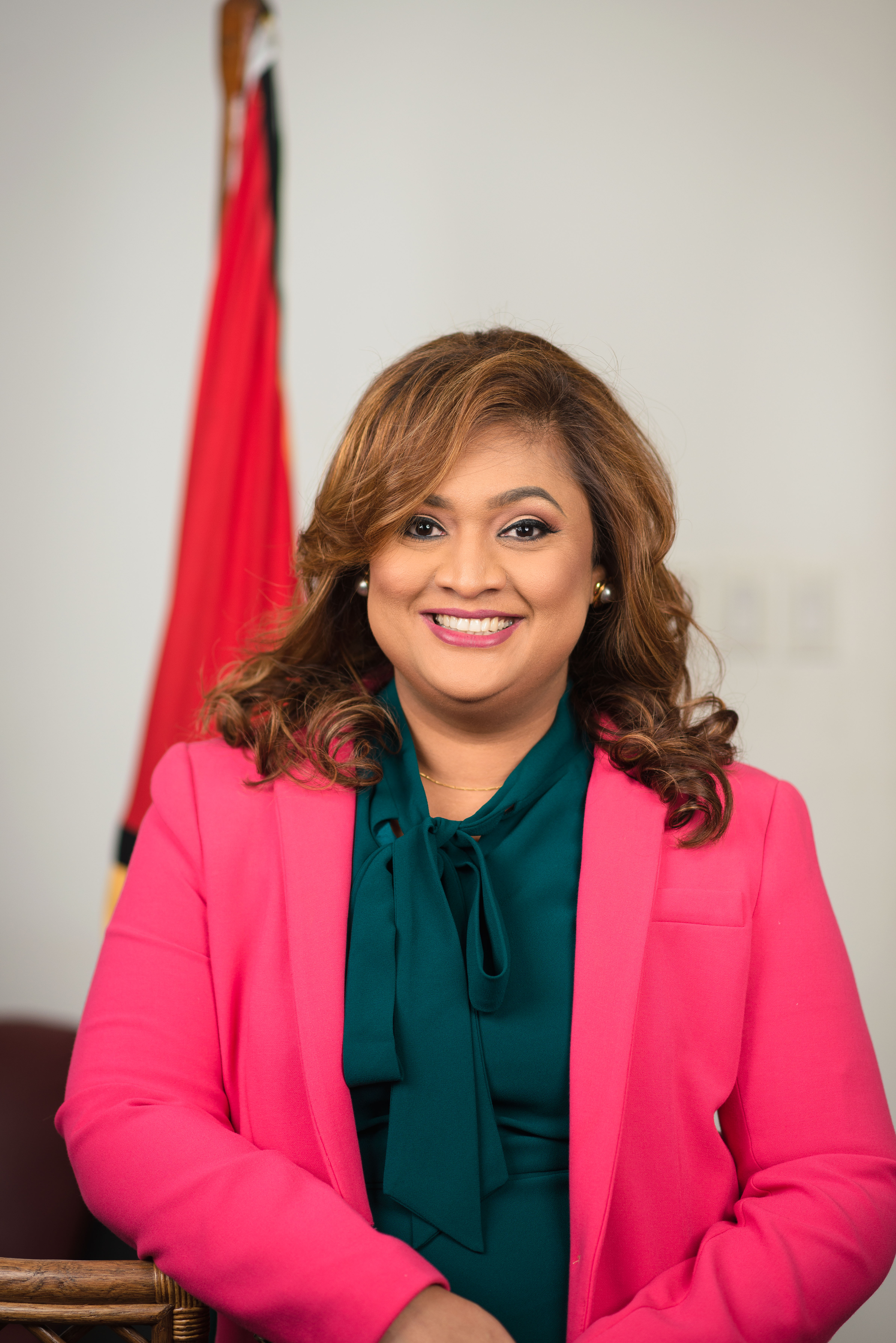
- Manickchand in 2020

Minister of Local Government
- Incumbent
- Assumed office 5 August 2020
- President: Irfaan Ali
- Preceded by: Nicolette Henry
- In office 5 December 2011 – 16 May 2015
- President: Donald Ramotar
- Preceded by: Shaik Baksh
- Succeeded by: Nicolette Henry

Personal details
- Spouse: Bhageshwar Murli
- Children: 2

Priya Manickchand is a Guyanese politician. She was the former Minister of Human Services and Social Security from 2006-2011. She also held the position of Minister of Education in Guyana between 2011-2015 and 2020-2025. She was appointed Minister of Local Government and Regional Development on September 15th, 2025, by President Irfaan Ali.

== Early Life ==
Priya Devi Manickchand was born on August 13th, 1976 to Hyacinth Manickchand, a school teacher, and Krishendat Manickchand, a rice and cattle farmer. Raised in Georgetown with her two siblings, Manickchand grew up Presbyterian and was an active member of the Guyana Presbyterian Church.

In her teens, Manickchand served as president of the National Youth Council of Presbyterian Church. She organized and ran Youth Camps for teenagers across the country, an early sign of her leadership skills.

== Education ==
She attended Stella Maris Primary School, and received secondary education at Queen's College. She also received her law degree from Hugh Wooding Law School.

== Early Career ==
Manickchand began her law career in 2000 as an associate Attorney at Khemraj Ramjattan and Associates. Following that, she began her own practice, and would go on to volunteer at the Georgetown Legal Aid Clinic as a Senior Supervising Attorney. At the time, it was Guyana’s sole legal aid provider.

Manickchand is a member of the People’s Progressive Party/Civic. She served on the board of the Guyana Geology and Mines Commission (2003-2006), the Omai Board of Directors, and was Chair of Region 5’s Rice Assessment Committee.

== Minister of Human Services and Social Security (2006-2011) ==
In 2006, Manickchand was appointed Minister of Human Services and Social Security under the presidency of Bharat Jagdeo. During her tenure, she championed policies for the well-being of women and children. The most notable of these is the overhaul of the country's Sex Offences Act, which officially criminalised marital rape.

Manickchand expanded the Georgetown Legal Aid Clinic to provide legal aid to other administrative regions in Guyana. By 2007, a year after she assumed office, six regions in Guyana had access to legal aid offices. Furthermore, she launched the National Domestic Violence Policy, aimed at providing legal and financial aid to victims of domestic abuse. In an interview with Kaieteur News, she noted that "..with the provision of legal aid and support services, that person does not have to be dependent on the breadwinner, and could proceed with legal action against that person.”

In 2008, Manickchand published 'Minimum Operational Standards & Regulations for Children's Homes in Guyana', a booklet that provided regulations for orphanages and care homes to abide by. The booklet was created with the support of UNICEF as part of an initiative to ensure that children in orphanages were receiving adequate care.

Manickchand also advocated to provide opportunities for single mothers with the Women of Worth program. This program collaborated with the Guyana Bank of Trade and Industry to provide single mothers low-interest loans to aid in starting or developing their businesses.

Additional policies implemented by Manickchand during her time in this position were the launch of the Men’s Affairs Bureau in 2011, and improving the distribution of old age pensions to senior citizens.

=== Acts for the Well-Being of Women and Children ===
In 2009, she spearheaded the Adoption of Children Act, the Status of Children Act, the Custody, Contact, Guardianship and Maintenance Act, the Protection of Children Act, and the Childcare and Protection Services Act. In May of the same year, these acts were passed unanimously in the National Assembly. The Adoption of Children Act provides protections for the rights of the child when it comes to adoption and foster care, positing that if the child is old enough to express an opinion, that opinion should be respected and taken into account. The Status of Children Act ensures that children born out of wedlock have the same legal rights as children born from a legal marriage.

The Childcare and Protection Act gave way to further improvements for children in Guyana, including the establishment of the Childcare and Protection Agency in June 2009. The Agency provides assistance relating to children in abusive situations, as well as resources for children living in poverty. In July of the same year, Manickchand and the Ministry of Human Services launched a foster care program. It aimed to get children off the streets and paired with safe homes – foster parents were funded by the State.

2010 saw the passage of the Sex Offenses Act, which overhauled the country’s sex offences laws. Manickchand sought feedback from citizens throughout the country, and wrote a white paper advocating for the passage of the Act. It expanded the legal definition of rape to include marital rape and the rape of men and boys, and included new, harsher penalties for offenders.

=== Family Court ===
In November 2009, construction began on Guyana’s first family court. This was another initiative created by Manickchand. It was a dedicated court to deal with family issues including divorce, division of property, domestic matters, adoption, applications on the status of children, guardianship, custody and related matters. While construction was completed in 2010, it did not become operational until 2016.

== Minister of Education (2011-2015) ==
Manickchand was appointed Minister of Education in 2011. During her time in the position, she implemented grants and aid for students with the goal of making education accessible for more families.

She created the Education For All-Fast Track Initiative (EFA-FTI), which aimed to provide accessible and affordable primary school education. As part of this initiative, uniform vouchers were given to parents, and free school lunches were made available in the hinterland regions of Guyana. Speaking on these programs, Manickchand said, “So what started as just a program for persons in difficult circumstances is now benefiting every single child in the school system… money must not be seen as a barrier to obtaining an education in Guyana.”

Further aid was provided under her leadership; in 2014, the Because We Care cash grant was launched. This was lauded as the first program of its kind in the Caribbean. More than 200,000 public school students benefited, receiving 10,000 Guyana Dollars each (approximately worth USD $48 at the time).

=== Revamp of the Education System ===
Manickchand also introduced a pilot project to improve pass rates for Math and English at the CSEC level. The project was implemented in thirty-two schools and included providing better resources for students and more training for teachers at the CSEC level. Under Manickchand’s leadership, Guyana saw consistent improvement at CSEC and CAPE. Students from across the country were lauded as the region’s top performers, including a student from Anna Regina secondary in 2013.

In her efforts to overhaul the education system, she re-evaluated the ‘No Child Left Behind’ policy, which had come under criticism from teachers and parents.

Another of her mandates was improving the University of Guyana. A World Bank loan of US $10 million was acquired, used to overhaul the university’s science and technology facilities. She also placed emphasis on the importance of investing in ICT in schools. Information Technology Laboratories were installed in ninety-five secondary schools across the country; the University of Guyana’s School of Education and Humanities also received a fully functional IT laboratory.

=== Burning of One Mile Primary ===
While Manickchand was in office, the One Mile Primary school was burnt as part of protest actions in Linden. She condemned the perpetrators, stating that “This is wrong, will affect our innocent children, will create grave hardship for all involved, and must be unreservedly condemned.” While the school was being reconstructed, Manickchand and the Ministry of Education moved the displaced students to other schools in the area. Rebuilding was officially completed in 2015.

=== Honorary Doctorate ===
While Manickchand did receive some criticism from the opposition party during her time as education minister, her tenure was widely positively received. In 2014, Lesley University conferred upon her an Honorary Doctorate for her work in social justice and gender equality. After receiving the degree, she addressed the graduates and called for them to work towards establishing gender equality. “I ask you, today, whatever your passion, whatever you plan to pursue, wherever you work, wherever you live, that you ensure you consciously and strategically set about to use your value, the education and training you leave here with, to bring about gender equality.”

== Minister of Education (2020-2025) ==
When the PPP/C was re-elected in 2020, Manickchand resumed her position as Minister of Education. She prioritized accessible education to all, implementing a number of grants, re-instating the 'Because We Care' cash grant, and overseeing the building and expansion of schools throughout the country. Moreover, her mandates focused on encouraging students to finish secondary school and seek tertiary education.

=== Monetary Aid for Students and Parents ===
In 2021, the Because We Care cash grant was re-instated. 172,000 students within the public school system benefitted, receiving $15,000 GYD, as well as a $4000 uniform/school supplies grant. In 2025, the grant was increased to $55,000 GYD. 205,000 students from both public and private schools received the grant.

Under Manickchand, the state and the Ministry of Education vowed to cover the full cost of eight CXC subjects per student, starting in 2025. This was another initiative aimed at encouraging students to complete secondary school. Furthermore, parents who had already paid examination fees for the year were reimbursed.

=== Expansion of the Guyana Learning Channel ===
Manickchand established EdYou FM in 2020, a radio program that provides educational content to children across Guyana. The government invested 300 million GYD in the radio program and expand the Guyana Learning Channel; in 2021, primary schools in the hinterland were equipped with televisions, solar power, and satellite connectivity to access these programs. Over ninety percent of hinterland communities are now able to take advantage of these educational resources.

=== School Feeding Program ===
By 2023, a school feeding program was implemented in all administrative regions in Guyana. Speaking at the launch of the program in Linden, Manickchand noted, "It’s our duty to help as far as our finances will allow and that is not disputable." Breakfast was provided for students from nursery to grade six; roughly 87,000 children were estimated to have benefited. In 2025, a similar program was launched as part of the Ministry of Education's Hinterland Improvement Drive. Free meals were provided to students living in dorm schools.

=== Book Distribution ===
In 2024, the Ministry of Education announced a nationwide book distribution initiatives for both primary and secondary schools. Students are provided with textbooks and workbooks free of cost. These cover foundational knowledge at the nursery and primary levels, as well as material relevant to the CSEC curriculum.

=== Investment in Teachers ===
Manickchand implemented a teachers’ resources grant. Schools receive money per student that teachers can use for school supplies, eliminating the need for them to pay out of pocket.

She also advocated for the reopening of the Cyril Potter College of Education (CPCE). It was closed after COVID-19; under Manickchand, it was reopened in 2021 and went online, allowing it to provide training to teachers throughout the country. It became accessible to teachers in hinterland communities. Manickchand also saw that the University of Guyana’s education degree program became fully online, allowing teachers to be trained within four years. As a result of this, the percentage of trained teachers went from 43% to 86% in the hinterland, and 63% to 98% on the coast; by 2025, more than 4000 teachers were fully trained.

=== Accessible Education ===
Manickchand oversaw the building and expansion of nursery, primary and secondary schools throughout Guyana. 54 new nursery schools were built during her tenure. As of 2025, Guyana has the highest rate of nursery enrollment in the Caribbean, despite it not being compulsory.

Primary schools were built in the hinterland villages of Kokshebai and Quiko in Region 9. Students who had to walk hours to get to school were now able to access education in their home communities. In addition, 24 new primary schools were built across the country and 36 were extended.

In 2025, Manickchand pledged universal access to secondary school for students across the country. While she highlighted the challenges associated with building schools in the hinterland - "...Our geography is very different from Caribbean islands; and I say islands. We’re a country. We have to put a school on a mountaintop, or at the bottom of a valley, or on a bank somewhere, a river bank…”- she maintained that the Ministry of Education was dedicated to addressing them.

Between 2020 and 2025, 41 secondary schools were built or are being constructed. 24 of these are in the hinterland (Regions 1, 7, 8 and 9) and 17 were built on the coast (Regions 2, 3, 4 and 10). Extensions were also added to schools that were damaged or in poor condition. Moreover, 14 secondary school dormitories were rebuilt and rehabilitated in accordance to the Deen and Partners report, which was commissioned by Manickchand and the Ministry of Education.

Formerly, the Caribbean Advanced Proficiency Examination (CAPE) was only offered in Georgetown. As part of the accessible education initiative, Manickchand several schools in other regions began to offer the examination: West Demerara Secondary in Region 3, Anna Regina Multilateral in Region 2, Rosignol Secondary in Region 5, and JC Chandisingh Secondary school in Region 6.

In addition to building schools, 2023 saw Technical Vocational Educational Training (TVET) Centres being built in Mabaruma, Fellowship, Beterverwagting, Hopetown, Bartica and St. Ignatius (in Regions 1, 3, 4, 5, 7 and 9, respectively). Practical departments were also built in several secondary schools. This allows students to receive level 1 and 2 training of the Caribbean Vocational Qualification (CVQ) in various technical skills.

=== Free Tertiary Education ===
In 2024, Manickchand announced at the National Assembly that the University of Guyana would become free to attend for Guyanese citizens. In 2025, this promise was fulfilled. The university is now free to attend, and former students are eligible for debt write-offs.

Manickchand also spearheaded the implementation of the GOAL (Guyana Academy of Online Learning) scholarship program in 2021. This program allows more than 30,000 Guyanese and counting to take online courses through foreign universities and obtain bachelor's and master's degrees, doctoral studies, and postgraduate diplomas. Speaking on the GOAL program, she said, "We are not people who find reasons why things can’t happen. We try to make sure that we give opportunities and of course, people have to avail themselves of those opportunities.”

Manickchand established the Get Ready for Opportunities to Work (GROW) program in 2022. GROW caters to Guyanese who were not able to complete their secondary education by helping them to acquire qualifications such as GEDs.

== Minister of Local Government and Regional Development (2025 - Present) ==
On September 15, 2025, Manickchand assumed the position of Minister of Local Government and Regional Development. In the new role, she aims to lead the ministry in 'strengthening local governance, empowering communities, and advancing regional development across the country.'

=== Bamia Primary School ===
One of Manickchand’s first acts as Minister of Local Government and Regional Development was to investigate unfinished and ongoing projects. She visited the Bamia Primary School, which was to be finished in 2023 but had not been completed by 2025, despite money being allocated to the construction. Manickchand emphasized that the current contractors needed to finish the school within the deadline or be removed from the project. Following her criticism, the school was officially opened in January 2026. Speaking on the opening of the school, Manickchand said that it was “a major and consistent effort that had to be employed to get this school finished”. The school now services students in Region 10, allowing them to attend school closer to home.

=== Urban Framework Plan ===
Manickchand also met with the King’s Foundation to discuss plans for the Urban Framework Plan for Greater and Central Georgetown. The Urban Framework Plan aims to overhaul Georgetown into a sustainable ‘Garden City’ and addresses five key areas: residential development, commercial expansion, highways, green systems, and water management.

She met with them again in July 2026 to discuss the modernization of Stabroek Market. This will focus on creating an environment that improves the experience of those living, working, and travelling through Georgetown, and how the market can be improved while also retaining its historical significance.

=== Kingston/Tiger Bay Improvements ===
The first area earmarked for improvement was the Kingston/Tiger Bay area. A shade house was constructed in the community at the One Guyana Kitchen. In March 2026, Tiger Bay women harvested their first crop and sold it to Massy Supermarket; their earnings are projected to be around 250,000 Guyana dollars per crop cycle. Manickchand plans to expand the project throughout Georgetown: “The whole idea is to make us self-sufficient and income earners, with particular focus on our vulnerable communities, which would really be women and young people."

=== Community Spaces ===
In January 2026, Manichckand saw the opening of a multi-sport community space in Tiger Bay, meant to provide recreational facilities for the youth in the area. The venue is shared between Mattai’s supermarket, which uses it for parking during the day, and the community, whose residents can access it in the evenings. Speaking at the opening, Manickchand said that it “reflects collaboration between private enterprise and community interests.” A similar recreation centre was completed in February 2026 at Gilhuys Square in West Ruimveldt.

Moreover, residents of Skull City and Area L in Region Three are slated to get a recreational park. This is the first park commissioned under Manickchand’s tenure as Minister of Local Government and Regional Development.

=== Georgetown Rehabilitation ===
2.8 billion Guyana dollars was allocated for improvements to Georgetown, including upgrades to major markets and green spaces. The rehabilitation of Stabroek Market is one of Manickchand’s main goals – bins, security cameras and lights have already been installed. Roof rehabilitation is also slated to occur. Additionally, money has been allocated to the East Ruimveldt Market and the La Penitence Market. Manickchand stated that she intendeds to address the waste management in Georgetown, something that has been a consistent issue. Her overall goal is for residents to “live comfortably in a wholesome environment with good streets, good drainage and enhanced spaces where their children could enjoy our country.”

$36.6 billion was allocated to the local government ministry as a whole. In Manickchand’s breakdown of her spending plan, she noted that the money would go towards building and rehabilitation of NDCs and the Rose Hall, Mahdia, and New Amsterdam Town Councils. Furthermore, eight new landfill sites are set to be built. Recreational spaces are also a priority.

=== Market Rehabilitation and Overhauls ===
In March 2026, Suddie vendors attended a meeting hosted by Manickchand. A new market was constructed in Suddie on the Essequibo Coast; roadside vendors are expected to be able to move their operations there once ventilation and tables are installed. The minister said that relocation should occur within six months. This market is one of many across the country receiving overhauls.

Renovations to East Ruimveldt Market were announced in July 2026, and are intended to take four months to be completed. Manickchand said that the construction will be under five contractors so that it will meet the expected deadline. She also announced that the drains in East Ruimveldt are being cleaned to prevent flooding. The new market is expected to accommodate 237 stalls, and will integrate roadside vendors.

Buxton is also slated to receive a market. Construction began after the sod-turning in July 2026; it is projected to be completed in eight months. This market will accommodate 136 stalls and provide space for existing vendors and roadside vendors. This is another step in the Ministry's efforts to modernize Guyana's market facilities. A new market at Plaisance was also announced, along with plans to enhance the Lusignan and Mon Repos markets on the East Coast.

Furthermore, the Kitty Market, which was under construction for more than a decade, is expected to open as soon as possible. Manickchand criticized the extended delay on the project, stating that it was undesirable and an inconvenience to vendors and consumers alike.

=== Increased Stipends ===
Manickchand also announced that local government officials, including NDC and RDC chairpersons, would receive increased stipends. Manickchand noted that much is expected from councilors, chairpersons and vice-chairpersons, emphasizing that these increases are meant to strengthen Guyana’s local democratic organs.

=== Yarrow Dam and Sideline Dam ===
The communities of Yarrow Dam and Sideline Dam in Georgetown face several issues, including drainage and flooding issues. In a walkthrough held in August 2026, Manickchand met with several residents from the communities to hear their issues. Interim measures were deployed to alleviate the garbage issue.

== Personal life ==
Manickchand married Bhageshwar Murli in 2009. He is a civil engineer and a Lieutenant Colonel in the Guyana Defense Force. Together, they have two children.
