= Harold Bollers =

Guyanese lawyer

Sir Harold Brodie Smith Bollers (5 February 1915 – 26 December 2006) was a Guyanese lawyer, who served as Chief Justice of Guyana.

Bollers was born in Georgetown, Guyana, educated at Queen College, Guyana and read law at King's College London. From 1966 to 1980 he was the first Chief Justice of Guyana following Guyana's independence.

His honours include Knight Bachelor (KB) in 1969, the Cacique's Crown of Honour (CCH) in 1982, and the Order of Roraima (OR) in 1991.
