= Winston Murray =

Winston Murray may refer to:

- Winston Murray (Guyanese politician) (1941–2010)
- Winston Murray (Trinidad and Tobago politician) (c. 1934–2017)
