= Mary Noel Menezes =

Guyanese nun and historian (1930–2022)

Sister Mary Noel Menezes OR
- Born: 14 July 1930; Georgetown, British Guiana
- Died: 31 August 2022 (aged 92); Georgetown, Guyana
- Occupation: Academic

Academic background
- Education: Saint Joseph's Teachers' College; College Misericordia; Georgetown University; University of London

Academic work
- Discipline: History
- Sub-discipline: Guyanese history
- Institutions: University of Guyana

Sister Mary Noel Menezes OR (14 July 1930 – 31 August 2022) was a Guyanese Roman Catholic nun and historian of Portuguese descent. She was involved with the University of Guyana from 1967 to her death in 2022, as a lecturer, head of department, full professor, and professor emeritus. She specialised in Guyanese history, particularly that of Amerindians and Portuguese Guyanese.

== Early life ==
Menezes was born on 14 July 1930 in Georgetown, British Guiana, to a family of Madeiran origin. She entered the Sisters of Mercy at the age of 17, moving to Pennsylvania for her religious training.

She returned home in 1950 and taught at St Joseph High School until 1952, when she moved to Jamaica to attend Saint Joseph's Teachers' College. She then graduated with a diploma in education in 1954, and then until 1963 taught at the Sacred Heart Roman Catholic School in Georgetown.

== Academia ==
Menezes returned to the United States to attend College Misericordia (BA in history) and Georgetown University (MA in Latin American history). She taught briefly at Sacred Heart College, North Carolina, and then in 1967 took up an appointment as a lecturer in the Department of History at the fledgling University of Guyana. In 1970, Menezes won a Ford Foundation scholarship to study at the University of London, where she completed a PhD (conferred 1973) on British policy towards Guyanese Amerindians in the 19th century.

In 1973, Menezes oversaw the creation of a Master of Arts program in Guyanese history, the first postgraduate degree offered by the University of Guyana. She was made head of department in 1977 and upgraded to professor of history in 1980, the first time in the university's history that position had been created. From 1978 to 1980, Menezes served as president of the Association of Caribbean Historians, the first woman to hold the position. She retired from teaching in 1990, and was made a professor emeritus in 2009. She published her most recent book in May 2017, aged 87, which was launched by President David A. Granger (one of her former students).

== Charity work and honours ==
From 1968 to 2003, Menezes ran the St John Bosco Orphanage in Plaisance, for boys aged three to sixteen. In 2000, she founded the Mercy Boys' Home in Georgetown for boys older than 16. She also served on the council of St. Joseph Mercy Hospital from 1985 to 2002. Menezes has received honorary degrees from Misericordia University (LHD, 1983), the University of the West Indies (LL.D., 2005), and Mount Aloysius College (L.H.D., 2008). She was awarded the Golden Arrow of Achievement by the Guyanese government in 1982, and in 2015 was inducted into the Order of Roraima.

== Personal life and death ==
Menezes died in Georgetown on 31 August 2022, at the age of 92.
