= Puisne judge =

Ordinary judge or a judge of lesser rank

Puisne judge and puisne justice (/ˈpjuːni/) are terms for an ordinary judge or a judge of lesser rank of a particular court. The term comes from a combination of the two French words, puis (since, later) and né (born) which have been combined as French: puisné or puîné; meaning "junior".

== Use ==
The term is used almost exclusively in common law jurisdictions: the jurisdiction of England and Wales within the United Kingdom; Australia, including its states and territories; Canada, including its provinces and territories; India, including its states and territories; Pakistan, its provinces, and Azad Kashmir; the British Overseas Territory of Gibraltar; Kenya; Sri Lanka; South Africa in rural provinces and Hong Kong. In Australia, the most senior judge after a chief justice in superior state courts is referred to as the "senior puisne judge".

Use is rare outside of, usually internal, court (judicial) procedural decisions as to which judge(s) will sit or has sat in hearings or appeals. The term is dated in detailed, academic case law analyses and, to varying degree direct applicability in higher courts.

The term excludes the court's chief judge(s)/justice(s); any seniormost judges, often specialists or a managerial head, sitting ex officio (by virtue of their office) as such in the court for which they have duties below; and any technically junior judges who may have been called to serve in a higher court, whom law reports and transcripts customarily specify as "sitting in" a judicial panel of a higher court or "sitting as" a judge of that court.

== By jurisdiction ==
=== Bermuda ===
In Bermuda, the Supreme Court comprises the Chief Justice and a number of puisne judges. As of January 2020, there are three puisne judges, with a vacancy for a fourth. New puisne judges are appointed by the Governor following a consultation with the Chief Justice.

=== Canada ===
In Canada judges other than the chief justice of a court are referred to as puisne judges.

=== Gibraltar ===
In Gibraltar, puisne judges, of which there must be at least one, are responsible for family law proceedings in the Supreme Court.

=== Jamaica ===
In Jamaica, the Supreme Court comprises the Chief Justice, and between 25 and 41 puisne judges, one of whom is designated the Senior Puisne Judge.

=== Mauritius ===
In Mauritius, the Supreme Court comprises the Chief Justice, the Senior Puisne Judge, and 20 other puisne judges.

=== United Kingdom ===
==== England and Wales ====
In England and Wales, judges of the High Court are referred to as puisne judges, unless the judge in question holds a specific title, such as Lord Chief Justice. Puisne judges must have at least seven years' experience as a barrister, or at least two years' experience as a circuit judge. The maximum number of puisne judges permitted in England and Wales at any one time is the full-time equivalent of 108.

Puisne judges are styled as The Honourable Mr/Mrs/Ms Justice [surname].

==== Northern Ireland ====
In Northern Ireland, judges of the High Court are referred to as puisne judges, with the exception of the Lord Chief Justice. The maximum number of puisne judges permitted in Northern Ireland at any one time is 15.

Puisne judges are styled as The Honourable Mr/Mrs/Madam Justice [surname].

== See also ==
- Puisne
