= Albert Earnshaw =

British lawyer and colonial judge (1865–1920)

- Born: 31 October 1865; Netherton, Yorkshire
- Died: 19 March 1920 (aged 54); Ipoh, Malaya
- Education: University College, Durham, Pembroke College, Oxford
- Occupations: Barrister and colonial judge

Albert Earnshaw (31 October 1865 – 19 March 1920) was a British lawyer and colonial judge.

== Early life and education ==
Earnshaw was born at Netherton, Yorkshire on 31 October 1865, the only son of David Earnshaw. He was educated at Huddersfield College; University College, Durham (BA), and Pembroke College, Oxford (MA). He was an open classical scholar and took first class honours at both universities. He was a fellow of Durham University from 1889 to 1897. In 1893, he was called to the Bar at the Inner Temple.

== Career ==
After practising on the North-Eastern Circuit from 1896 to 1904, Earnshaw went to the Windward Islands where he served as magistrate at Grenada, and as a member of the Legislative Council of the Windward Islands. In 1907, he went to British Guiana where he served as stipendiary magistrate. While there he served as chairman of the Commission on Queen's College, Georgetown and as sole commissioner on various hospital issues. In 1909, he was transferred to the Gold Coast Colony where he held the appointment of Puisne Judge and served as chairman of the Commission to enquire into education questions. In 1912, he returned to British Guiana as Puisne Judge, and in the following year was appointed acting Chief Justice, British Guiana.

In 1914, Earnshaw was appointed Puisne Judge of the Supreme Court, Straits Settlements, Singapore and Judicial Commissioner of the Federated Malay States.

== Personal life and death ==
Earnshaw married Sarah Haley in 1896.

Earnshaw died suddenly on 19 March 1920 due to cerebral hemorrhage at Ipoh, Malaya, aged 54.
