= Roxane George-Wiltshire =

Guyanese lawyer and jurist

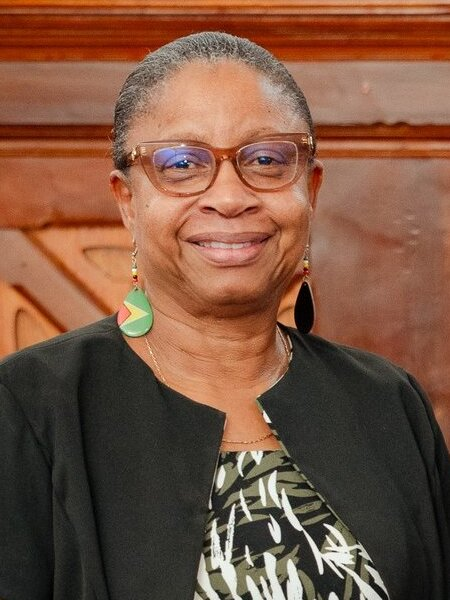
- George-Wiltshire in 2025

Acting Chief Justice of Guyana
- Incumbent
- Assumed office 28 March 2017

Personal details
- Born: Alison Roxane McLean George-Wiltshire

Alison Roxane McLean George-Wiltshire is a Guyanese lawyer and jurist who has served as Chief Justice of Guyana since 2017. President David A. Granger appointed her in an acting capacity, but she has never been formally appointed to the position.

== Early life ==
Alison Roxane McLean George-Wiltshire was admitted to the bar in 1990. She worked as a Director of Public Prosecutions.

== Career ==
President David A. Granger appointed George-Wiltshire as the acting Chief Justice of Guyana on 1 March, 2017, and swore her in on 28 March 2017. The Guyana Bar Association endorsed her nomination and later issued a call for her nomination to be advanced in 2025. However, she was still serving in an acting capacity as of 2025. President Irfaan Ali did not give a reason as for why he has not confirmed George-Wiltshire as chief justice.

A motion of no confidence against Granger was upheld by George-Wiltshire and ruled that the resignation of president and his cabinet was required. The results of the 2020 election were upheld by a ruling George-Wiltshire made.

In February 2023, George-Wiltshire ruled that Section 14 of the Matrimonial Causes Act was unconstitutional as it was discriminated based on sex and gender. The section only had men paying alimony and not women. In 2024, she was critical of the Judicial Decisions Act, which required judicial rulings within 120 days, as she felt it would impractical with the heavy workload of judges.

In October 2022, an intruder broke into George-Wiltshire's house and pointed a toy gun at two police officers before fleeing.

== Works cited ==
=== News ===
- "Chief Justice George-Wiltshire criticises Judicial Decisions Act, citing practicality given heavy caseload". Village Voice News. 8 June 2025. Archived from the original on 23 June 2025.
- "Bar association calls again for confirming of justices Cummings-Edwards, George". Stabroek News. 15 January 2025.
- "Claudette Singh, Vidyanand Persaud, Roxane George, Basil Williams among nine appointed as senior counsel". Stabroek News. 31 December 2016.
- "DPP challenges judge's orders on completion of trials". Stabroek News. 17 July 2010.
- "Intruder points toy gun at CJ's guards, flees". Stabroek News. 22 October 2022.
- "Justices Cummings-Edwards, George-Wiltshire appointed to act at top of judiciary". Stabroek News. 2 March 2017.
- "Law to be amended to allow for equal benefits for husband and wife". Kaieteur News. 22 July 2024. Archived from the original on 7 August 2024.
- Chabrol, Denis (31 December 2024). "President gives no specific reason for not confirming Chancellor, Chief Justice". Barbados Today.
- Deane, Sandy (26 April 2021). "Guyana's Chief Justice throws out second opposition election petition". Barbados Today. Archived from the original on 23 June 2025.
- Fraser, Zoisa (1 February 2019). "Chief Justice upholds no-confidence vote". Stabroek News.

=== Web ===
- "Acting Chancellor, Chief Justice sworn in -way cleared for Court of Appeal shortages to be addressed". President of Guyana. 27 March 2017. Archived from the original on 23 June 2025.
