= Order of Roraima of Guyana =

Award of the Republic of Guyana

Awarded by Guyana
- Type: State Order
- Established: 1976
- Eligibility: Citizens of Guyana; others may receive an honorary award.
- Awarded for: Distinction and eminence in any field of endeavour of national or international importance.
- Status: Currently constituted.
- Chancellor: President of Guyana
- Grades: Member (OR)

Precedence
- Next (higher): Order of Excellence of Guyana
- Next (lower): Order of Service of Guyana
- Ribbon of the order

The Order of Roraima of Guyana is the second highest National Award of Guyana, and is limited to only thirty five living Guyanese recipients. Established in 1976, it is awarded to any citizen of Guyana who has given outstanding service to the nation. Citizens of foreign nations who are deemed eligible may be appointed as honorary members of the order.

== Recipients ==
- Désirée Bernard
- Harold Bollers
- Viola Burnham
- Martin Carter
- Kim Jong-il
- Edward Luckhoo
- Mary Noel Menezes
- Mia Mottley
- Sase Narain
- Jane Phillips-Gay
- Freundel Stuart

== See also ==
- Orders, decorations, and medals of Guyana
