= Sase Narain =

Guyanese politician and lawyer (1925–2020)

Sase Narain OR SC CMG

Speaker of the National Assembly of Guyana
- In office 4 January 1971 – 10 June 1992
- Preceded by: Rahman Baccus Gajraj
- Succeeded by: Derek Chunilall Jagan

Personal details
- Born: 27 January 1925
- Died: 25 August 2020 (aged 95) Queenstown, Georgetown, Guyana
- Party: People's National Congress
- Spouse: Shamshun (m. 1952)
- Children: 5
- Occupation: lawyer, politician

Sase Narain OR SC CMG (27 January 1925 – 25 August 2020) was a Guyanese politician and lawyer. He served as Speaker of the National Assembly of Guyana from 1971 to 1992, becoming the longest serving Speaker in Guyana.

== Early life ==
Sase Narain grew up in Pouderoyen, Essequibo Islands-West Demerara, British Guiana, and attended the Modern Educational Institute in Georgetown. After finishing high school, he went to the United Kingdom to study law. In 1957, he graduated from the City Law School in London.

When he returned to Guyana, Narain became the President of the Sanatan Dharma Maha Sabha.

== Speaker of the National Assembly ==
In 1991, Narain became the first Speaker of Guyana’s National Assembly to expel a Member of Parliament after Minister of Agriculture Isahak Basir threw a drinking glass at Narain.

== Later career ==
After leaving the National Assembly, Narain resumed his law practice. He retired in 2012.

== Death ==
Narain died on 25 August 2020 in Queenstown, Georgetown at the age of 95. Former Prime Minister Hamilton Green praised him for "his candor and his wisdom".

== Honours ==
- Order of Roraima, Guyana
- Companion of the Order of St Michael and St George, UK (1969)
