= Charles Wray =

Chief Justice of Guyana

Charles Wray (c. 1786 – 2 October 1836) was Chief Justice of Guyana for fourteen years from 1821 to 1835, having been a barrister in England.

Wray was the son of Colonel John Wray, of Park Place, St James's, formerly of Hull, and the brother of another John Wray, the Receiver of the Metropolitan Police from 1829 to 1860. He was educated at Shrewsbury, then took a B.A. (1807) and M.A. (1810) from Trinity College, Cambridge.

He was called to the bar in 1811 from Lincoln's Inn, and worked on the Northern Circuit; he was then nominated Recorder of Hull. In 1821, he was appointed Chief Justice of Guyana, and served in this capacity until 1835. He was also a Lieutenant Colonel on the staff of the George Town Brigade of Militia. Shortly after his retirement, Wray died, on 2 October 1836. His son, Lieutenant-General Henry Wray C.M.G., was an engineer and Lieutenant Governor of Jersey.
