= Newnham Worley =

British colonial judge (1892–1976)

Sir Newnham Arthur Worley KBE
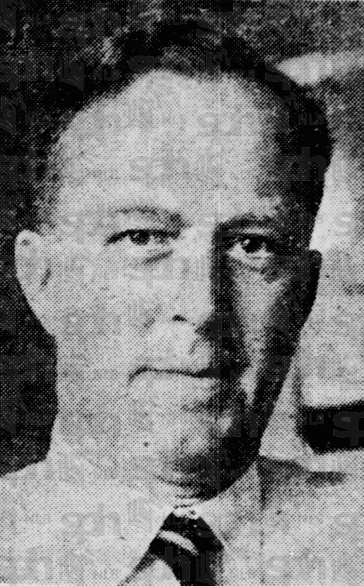
- Worley in 1940

Chief Justice, British Guiana
- In office 1947–1951
- Preceded by: Sir John Verity
- Succeeded by: Sir (Edward) Peter Stubbs Bell

Chief Justice, Bermuda
- In office 1958–1960
- Preceded by: Sir Joseph Trounsell Gilbert
- Succeeded by: Sir Myles John Abbott

Personal details
- Born: 2 March 1892
- Died: 13 May 1976 (aged 84)
- Children: 2 daughters
- Education: Emmanuel College, Cambridge
- Occupation: Barrister and colonial judge

Sir Newnham Arthur Worley KBE (2 March 1892 – 13 May 1976) was a British lawyer and judge who served as Chief Justice, British Guiana from 1947 to 1951, and Chief Justice, Bermuda from 1958 to 1960.

== Early life and education ==
Worley was born on 2 March 1892, the youngest son of Charles Worley. He was educated at Reigate Grammar School and Emmanuel College, Cambridge (MA), and was called to the Bar by the Inner Temple.

== Career ==
Worley served in the Malayan Civil Service from 1914 to 1937. In 1937, he joined the Colonial Legal Service as Deputy Public Prosecutor, and later that year was appointed Solicitor-General, Straits Settlements in Singapore. In 1940, he served as acting Attorney-General and as a member of the Legislative Council. From 1941 to 1947, he was a Puisne Judge, Supreme Court, Straits Settlements in Singapore, and was interned by the Japanese from 1942 to 1945.

From 1947 to 1951, Worley served as Chief Justice, British Guiana, and as a Member of West Indian Court of Appeal. From 1955 to 1958, he was President, East African Court of Appeal, having been its Vice-President from 1951 to 1955. He retired from the Overseas Judiciary in 1958, but in the same year was appointed Chief Justice, Bermuda. He resigned in 1960.

== Personal life and death ==
Worley married Marie Forlong in 1919 and they had two daughters.

Worley died on 13 May 1976, aged 84.

== Honours ==
Worley was created Knight Bachelor in the 1950 New Year Honours, and was appointed Knight Commander of the Order of the British Empire (KBE) in 1958 New Years Honours.
