= Richard Ground =

English judge

Sir Richard William Ground, OBE (17 December 1949 – 22 February 2014) was an English judge in the Cayman Islands and Bermuda.

== Biography ==
Ground was born in Stamford, England in 1949 and studied at Lincoln College, Oxford, Inns of Court School of Law. He was called to the bar at Gray's Inn in 1975. He was a media lawyer in London, before going to the Cayman Islands to serve as Crown Counsel from 1983 to 1987 and then as Attorney General of the Cayman Islands from 1987 to 1992.

He was Chief Justice of the Turks and Caicos Islands from 1998 to 2004, and Chief Justice of Bermuda from 2004 to 2012. Ground retired as Chief Justice in 2012 and was succeeded by Ian Kawaley.

== Personal life and death ==
He died on 22 February 2014 in Grindleford, Derbyshire, survived by his widow, Dace McCoy Ground, whom he married in 1986.
