= Guyanese nationality law =

Guyanese nationality law is regulated by the 1980 Constitution of Guyana, as amended; the Citizenship Act of 1967, and its revisions; and various British Nationality laws. These laws determine who is, or is eligible to be, a national of Guyana. Guyanese nationality is typically obtained either on the principle of jus soli, i.e. by birth in Guyana; or under the rules of jus sanguinis, i.e. by birth abroad to parents with Guyanese nationality. It can also be granted to persons with an affiliation to the country, or to a permanent resident who has lived in the country for a given period of time through naturalisation. There is not currently a program in Guyana for persons to acquire nationality through investment in the country. Nationality establishes one's international identity as a member of a sovereign nation. Though it is not synonymous with citizenship, for rights granted under domestic law for domestic purposes, the United Kingdom, and thus the Commonwealth, have traditionally used the words interchangeably.

== Acquiring Guyanese nationality ==
Guyanese nationality is acquired through birth, registration, or naturalisation.

=== By birth ===
Nationality is acquired at birth by:

- Persons who are born within the territory, except if the parent has diplomatic immunity or is a national of a country at war with Guyana;
- Persons who are born abroad to at least one parent who was born in Guyana;
- Persons born upon aircraft or ships registered in Guyana or unregistered aircraft or ships belonging to the government; or
- Foundlings.

=== By registration ===
Nationality by registration includes those who have familial or historic relationship affiliations with Guyana. Persons who acquire nationality by registration include:

- Persons who were the spouse or widow/er of a national who acquired nationality at the time of independence, or would have acquired nationality except for the death of the spouse;
- Persons who at independence had been an ordinary resident of Guyana in the preceding ten years for a period of time aggregating to five years;
- Minor persons, who were born to a Guyanese parent, or a parent who would have acquired such nationality at independence had the parent not died prior to independence;
- Post-independence, the spouse of a national, who poses no threat to national security or public order;
- Persons who are nationals of a Commonwealth country, or the Republic of Ireland, who have become residents of Guyana and resided in the territory or worked for the government for at least five years;
- Minors under age eighteen who are legally adopted are eligible for registration upon issuance of an adoption order; or
- Persons born to a Guyanese mother, who were rendered stateless because of the previous inability of married women to pass their nationality on to their children, as long as they pose no threat to national security.

=== By naturalisation ===
Ordinary naturalisation in Guyana can be obtained by adult persons of legal capacity, who in the 12 months prior to submitting an application resided in the territory, are of good character, and intend to be a resident of Guyana. Applicants petition the Minister responsible for immigration, who considers whether the applicant has resided within the territory for seven years and poses no threat to national security. Upon approval, applicants must take an Oath of Allegiance.

== Loss of nationality ==
Nationals may voluntarily renounce their affiliation with Guyana, if the declarant is a legal adult and is able to acquire other nationality, eliminating the prospect of statelessness within twelve months. Renunciation may not be accepted if Guyana is in a war with the proposed new source of nationality. Denaturalisation may occur if a person obtained nationality through fraud, false representation, or concealment; if they have committed acts of treason; if they have committed acts of disloyalty or service to a foreign government; if they are found guilty of certain criminal offences; and for acquisition of another nationality.

== Dual nationality ==
Guyanese law affords some forms of dual citizenship. Article 46(1) of the Constitution allow for the revocation of citizenship if a Guyanese voluntarily acquires another nationality "by registration, naturalisation or any other or other voluntary and formal act (other than marriage)..." Persons who automatically acquire multiple citizenships at birth (including by descent) are generally not subjected to this provision, though dual citizens are generally disqualified from election to the National Assembly under Article 155(1)(a).

== History ==
=== Dutch colonial period (1581–1814) ===
Guiana was sighted by Christopher Columbus in 1498 and claimed by Spain. The Dutch founded a settlement at the mouth of the Pomeroon River in Spanish territory in 1581 and the Spanish established a settlement known as Santo Thomé in 1592, but made little other attempt to settle the region. These early settlements had only temporary occupation. From 1598, Dutch traders began operating in the area that would become known as Dutch Guiana and established a fort on the Courantyne River in 1613. Within three years, a Dutch fort had been established as a private enterprise at Essequibo. In 1621 the Dutch West India Company was chartered to take over management of the colonies, which included several settlements. Berbice was established by 1628 and in 1657, the Zeelandia Company formed to establish administration over the colonies, which included at that time Cayenne. The British colony of Suriname was ceded to the Dutch in 1667 in exchange for New Amsterdam and additional trading posts were founded at Demerara and Pomeroon by 1691. Because the Dutch colonies were founded as commercial enterprises, nationality did not play a large role in the governance. Roman-Dutch common law, per the Order of Government (Dutch: Ordre van Regieringe) of 1629, was the foundation of the legal code in the colony, and there was no national civil law defining the rights or obligations of inhabitants.

Religious ties, Jews were excluded from the colonies, and membership in the plantocracy were the characteristics that bound the colonists. Because of various wars between the British, Dutch, and French colonial powers, the Dutch colonies changed hands multiple times. The Concept Plan of Redress, the first formal constitutional document, was adopted in 1787 and when the Dutch West India Company's charter expired in 1792, the United Colony of Demerara and Essequibo, still operating under the Concept Plan, were administered directly by the Dutch government. Britain captured the colonies of Berbice and Demerara-Essequibo 1796, but in 1802 restored to the Netherlands under the terms of the Treaty of Amiens. In 1809, the Netherlands adopted the first civil code using the concept of nationality, when King Louis Napoleon ordered that a modification of the Civil Code of France be adopted. The Dutch Civil Code legally incapacitated married women, making them dependent upon their husbands, and automatically bestowed upon wives the nationality of their husbands. Britain recaptured the territories during the Napoleonic Wars and the United Colony of Demerara-Essequibo was formally ceded to Britain by the Dutch by the Anglo-Dutch Treaty of 1814.

=== British colony (1814–1966) ===
The Concept Plan of Redress remained governing document of the area until 1928, despite the territory being under British control since 1814. In 1831, Berbice joined the United Colony to form British Guiana. The first major modification of the Plan of Redress occurred in 1834, when slavery was abolished. Though "inhabitants" was still used to describe nationals in the Ordinance No. 57 of 1835, those who were entitled to political rights were no longer defined by the number of slaves they owned. Non-whites were excluded from rights and the freed slaves were required to serve a four to six year unpaid apprenticeship. Married women were subjugated to the authority of their husbands under coverture, and the law was structured to maintain social hierarchies by regulating familial matters like, who could marry, legitimacy, and inheritance. Amerindians, which to that point had served as police, capturing runaway slaves, from the point slavery was abolished were no longer considered as part of the society and were omitted from concerns of the government. The abolition of slavery resulted in a plantation labor shortage, which planters solved by importing indentured laborers from the British Raj. Keen to regulate the marriages of indentured laborers, Britain imposed the Heathen Marriage Ordinance in 1860, which would remain in effect until 1894. It recognised marriages conducted under Christian rites and voided unions conducted under Hindu or Muslim rites, rendering children born to non-Christian parents as illegitimate. Constitutional changes made in 1891 reformed political rights but had no impact on the nationality scheme. In 1910, a commission was called to evaluate the laws of British Guiana, which recommended changing all laws in the colony to British common law, except real property law.

Based upon the recommendations of the law commission, the Civil Law of British Guiana Ordinance was passed in 1916. In most instances the Ordinance replaced former Roman-Dutch law with English common law. With regard to nationality, this meant that the uniform policy known as the British Nationality and Status of Aliens Act of 1914 applied to all British subjects across the Empire. The 1914 Act allowed local jurisdictions in the self-governing Dominions to continue regulating nationality in their territories, but also established an imperial nationality scheme throughout the realm. The uniform law, which went into effect on 1 January 1915, required a married woman to derive her nationality from her spouse, meaning if he was British, she was also, and if he was foreign, so was she. It stipulated that upon loss of nationality of a husband, a wife could declare that she wished to remain British and provided that if a marriage had terminated, through death or divorce, a British-born national who had lost her status through marriage could reacquire British nationality through naturalisation without meeting a residency requirement. The statute reiterated common law provisions for natural-born persons born within the realm on or after the effective date. By using the word person, the statute nullified legitimacy requirements for jus soli nationals. For those born abroad on or after the effective date, legitimacy was still required, and could only be derived by a child from a British father (one generation), who was natural-born or naturalised. Naturalisations required five years residence or service to the crown.

Amendments to the British Nationality Act were enacted in 1918, 1922, 1933 and 1943 changing derivative nationality by descent and modifying slightly provisions for women to lose their nationality upon marriage. In 1928, British Guiana was made a crown colony and the local legislatures were suspended. Because of a rise in statelessness, a woman who did not automatically acquire her husband's nationality upon marriage or upon his naturalisation in another country, did not lose their British status after 1933. The 1943 revision to the British Nationality Act allowed a child born abroad at any time to be a British national by descent if the Secretary of State agreed to register the birth. Under the terms of the British Nationality Act 1948, British nationals in British Guiana were reclassified at that time as "Citizens of the UK and Colonies" (CUKC). The basic British nationality scheme did not change overmuch, and typically those who were previously defined as British remained the same. Changes included that wives and children no longer automatically acquired the status of the husband or father, children who acquired nationality by descent no longer were required to make a retention declaration, and registrations for children born abroad were extended.

=== Post-independence (1966–present) ===
On 26 May 1966, British Guiana gained its independence and changed its name to Guyana. Generally, persons who had previously been nationals as defined under the classification of "Citizens of the UK and Colonies", would become nationals of Guyana on Independence Day and cease to be British nationals. However, automatic conferment only occurred for people born in Guyana or who were Guyanese by descent. Persons who were naturalised or registered CUKCs had to apply to be nationals. Exceptions were made for persons to retain their British nationality and status if they (or their father or grandfather) were born, naturalised, or registered in a part of the realm which remained on 1 November part of the United Kingdom or colonies, or had been annexed by such a place. Other exceptions included that married women would not lose their status as British nationals unless their husband did. At the time of independence, legitimate children born abroad derived nationality only from a father and only illegitimate children born abroad could derive their mother's nationality. Similarly, the provision for married persons included only that wives of Guyanese men could register as nationals. In 1970, the constitution was revised and the country moved from a monarchical to a republican form of government. The Constitution of that year provided that children could derive nationality from either their mother or father and allowed any spouse to be registered upon marriage. The 1980 Constitution, which repealed former constitutions, provided for full legal equality between men and women.

== Commonwealth citizenship ==
Guyanese citizens are also Commonwealth citizens, and those who are permanently resident in the United Kingdom are eligible to vote in its elections, as qualifying Commonwealth citizens for electoral purposes.
