= List of heads of state of Guyana =

This is a list of the heads of state of Guyana, from the independence of Guyana in 1966 to the present day.

From 1966 to 1970 the head of state under the Constitution of 1966 was the queen of Guyana, Elizabeth II, who was also the monarch of the other Commonwealth realms. The monarch was represented in Guyana by a governor-general. Guyana became a republic within the Commonwealth under the Constitution of 1970 and the monarch and governor-general were replaced by a ceremonial president, by that time.

== Monarch (1966–1970) ==
The succession to the throne was the same as the succession to the British throne.

No.	Portrait	Name (Birth–Death)	Reign			Royal House	Prime minister(s)
No.	Portrait	Name (Birth–Death)	Reign start	Reign end	Duration	Royal House	Prime minister(s)
1		Queen Elizabeth II (1926–2022)	26 May 1966	23 February 1970	3 years, 273 days	Windsor	Burnham

=== Governor-general ===
The governor-general was the representative of the monarch in Guyana and exercised most of the powers of the monarch. The governor-general was appointed for an indefinite term, serving at the pleasure of the monarch. Since Guyana was granted independence by the Guyana Independence Act 1966, rather than being first established as a semi-autonomous dominion and later promoted to independence as defined by the Statute of Westminster 1931, the governor-general was to be always appointed solely on the advice of the Cabinet of Guyana without the involvement of the British government, with the sole exception of Richard Luyt, the former colonial governor, who served as governor-general temporarily until he was replaced by David Rose. In the event of a vacancy the Chancellor (the head of the judicial branch, serving directly above the Chief Justice of Guyana) would have served as the officer administering the government.

Following is a list of people who have served as Governor-General of Guyana.

Status

Denotes acting governor-general

Symbols

^{†} Died in office

No.	Portrait	Name (Birth–Death)	Term of office			Monarch (Reign)
No.	Portrait	Name (Birth–Death)	Took office	Left office	Time in office	Monarch (Reign)
1		Sir Richard Luyt (1915–1994)	26 May 1966	16 December 1966	204 days	Elizabeth II (1966–1970)
2		Sir David Rose (1923–1969)	16 December 1966	10 November 1969^{[†]}	2 years, 329 days	Elizabeth II (1966–1970)
–		Sir Edward Luckhoo (1912–1998)	10 November 1969	23 February 1970	105 days	Elizabeth II (1966–1970)

== Republic (1970–present) ==
Under the Constitution of 1970, the first constitution of the Republic of Guyana, the president replaced the monarch as ceremonial head of state. The president was elected by the National Assembly for a six-year term. In the event of a vacancy the Chancellor (the head of the judicial branch, serving directly above the Chief Justice of Guyana) served as acting president. In 1980, the powers of the president were increased, with the establishment of the executive presidency.

Currently, the president is both head of state and head of government and, pursuant to article 91 of the Constitution, is directly elected by a first-past-the-post double simultaneous vote system, whereby each party running in the parliamentary elections nominates a presidential candidate and the presidential candidate of the party which receives the most votes is elected president. In the event of a vacancy, the prime minister becomes president.

Political parties

People's National Congress Reform (PNCR)
People's Progressive Party/Civic (PPP/C)

Other affiliations

Independent

No.	Portrait	Name (Birth–Death)	Term of office			Political party (coalition)	Elected	Cabinet(s)	Prime minister(s)	Ref.
No.	Portrait	Name (Birth–Death)	Took office	Left office	Time in office	Political party (coalition)	Elected	Cabinet(s)	Prime minister(s)	Ref.
Ceremonial President
1		Arthur Chung (1918–2008)	17 March 1970	6 October 1980	10 years, 203 days	Independent	1970	—N/a	Burnham	
1		Arthur Chung (1918–2008)	17 March 1970	6 October 1980	10 years, 203 days	Independent	1976	—N/a	Burnham	
Executive President
2		Forbes Burnham (1923–1985)	6 October 1980	6 August 1985 #	4 years, 304 days	PNCR	1980	Burnham	Reid; Hoyte	
3		Desmond Hoyte (1929–2002)	6 August 1985	9 October 1992	7 years, 64 days	PNCR	—	Hoyte I	Green	
3		Desmond Hoyte (1929–2002)	6 August 1985	9 October 1992	7 years, 64 days	PNCR	1985	Hoyte II	Green	
4		Cheddi Jagan (1918–1997)	9 October 1992	6 March 1997 #	4 years, 148 days	PPP/C	1992	C. Jagan	Hinds	
5		Sam Hinds (born 1943)	6 March 1997	19 December 1997	288 days	PPP/C	—	Hinds	J. Jagan	
6		Janet Jagan (1920–2009)	19 December 1997	11 August 1999 (Resigned)	1 year, 235 days	PPP/C	1997	J. Jagan	Hinds; Jagdeo	
7		Bharrat Jagdeo (born 1964)	11 August 1999	3 December 2011	12 years, 114 days	PPP/C	—	Jagdeo I	Hinds	
7		Bharrat Jagdeo (born 1964)	11 August 1999	3 December 2011	12 years, 114 days	PPP/C	2001	Jagdeo I	Hinds	
7		Bharrat Jagdeo (born 1964)	11 August 1999	3 December 2011	12 years, 114 days	PPP/C	2006	Jagdeo II	Hinds	
8		Donald Ramotar (born 1950)	3 December 2011	16 May 2015	3 years, 164 days	PPP/C	2011	Ramotar	Hinds	
9		David Granger (born 1945)	16 May 2015	2 August 2020 (Note: Lost confidence vote on 21 December 2018; see 2020 Guyanese general election)	5 years, 78 days	PNCR (APNU)	2015	Granger	Nagamootoo	
10		Irfaan Ali (born 1980)	2 August 2020	Incumbent	6 years, 73 days	PPP/C	2020	Ali I	Phillips	
10		Irfaan Ali (born 1980)	2 August 2020	Incumbent	6 years, 73 days	PPP/C	2025	Ali II	Phillips	

== Standards ==
Flag of the governor-general (1966–1970)

Presidential standard of Guyana under President Arthur Chung

Presidential standard of Guyana under President Forbes Burnham

Presidential standard of Guyana under President Desmond Hoyte

Presidential standard of Guyana under President Cheddi Jagan

Presidential standard of Guyana under President Janet Jagan

Presidential standard of Guyana used by President Bharrat Jagdeo

Presidential standard of Guyana under President Donald Ramotar

Presidential standard of Guyana under President David A. Granger

Current presidential standard of Guyana used by President Irfaan Ali
