= Rahman Baccus Gajraj =

Guyanese politician and lawyer

Rahman B. Gajraj

Speaker of the National Assembly of Guyana
- In office 16 February 1968 – 4 January 1971
- Preceded by: Aubrey Percival Alleyne
- Succeeded by: Sase Narain

Personal details
- Born: 11 May 1910 Georgetown, British Guiana (now Guyana)
- Died: 23 February 2004 (aged 93) Toronto, Ontario, Canada
- Education: Queen's College, Guyana
- Occupation: lawyer

Rahman Bacchus Gajraj, CBE (11 May 1910 – 23 February 2004) was a Guyanese politician and lawyer. He served as Speaker of the National Assembly of Guyana from 1961 to 1964 and 1968 to 1971. He also served as Lord Mayor of Georgetown, Guyana and as a diplomat, serving as High Commissioner to India and Canada. He died in Toronto, Ontario, Canada in 2004.

He was appointed a CBE in the 1965 New Year Honours List.
