= Barton Scotland =

Guyanese politician and diplomat

Barton U. A. Scotland
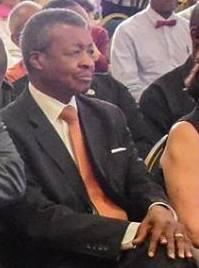
- Scotland in 2017

Speaker of the National Assembly of Guyana
- In office 10 June 2015 – 1 September 2020
- Preceded by: Raphael Trotman
- Succeeded by: Manzoor Nadir

Personal details
- Education: University of London
- Occupation: lawyer

Barton U. A. Scotland is a Guyanese politician and former diplomat. He has served as Speaker of the National Assembly of Guyana from 10 June 2015 to 1 September 2020.

Scotland formerly worked in the Ministry of Foreign Affairs as a senior diplomat and advisor. He was also the head of the Department of International Economic Co-operation, and a Commissioner on the Caricom Competition Commission. A lawyer, Scotland holds Master of Laws and PhD (international law) degrees from the University of London.
