= Chief Justice of Guyana =

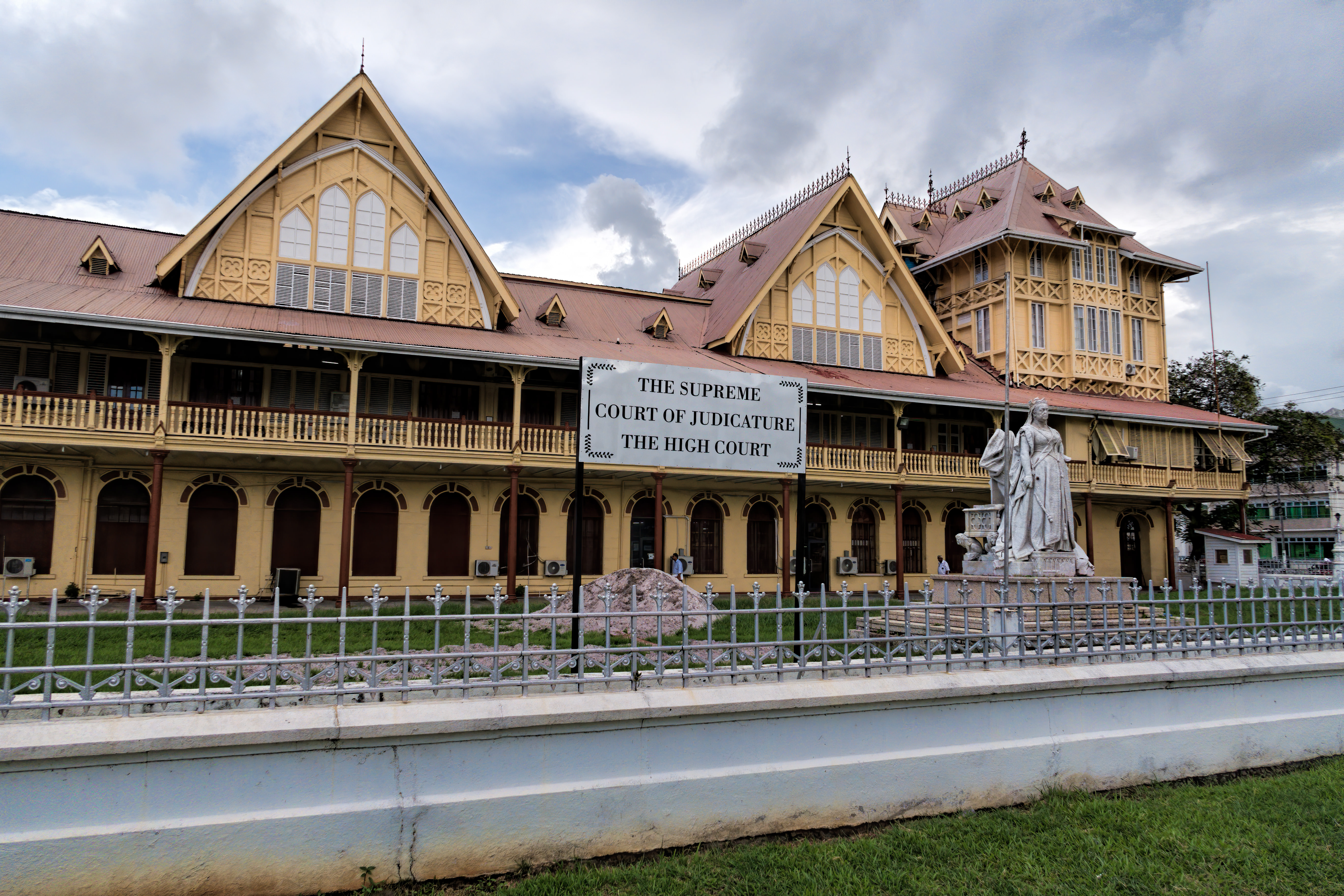
The Supreme Court of Guyana

The chief justice of Guyana is the senior judge of the High Court of the Supreme Court of Guyana and is appointed by the president of Guyana. The High Court consists of the chief Justice as President of the Court supported by several Puisne judges.

There is a right of appeal from the Supreme Court to the Guyana Court of Appeal, which was established in 1966 and consists of the Chancellor as President of the Court assisted by the chief justice and several justices of appeal. Since 1966 the chancellor has thus been the head of the Judiciary in Guyana.

== Chancellors ==
- 1966–1968 Sir Kenneth Sievewright Stoby
- 1968–1975 Sir Edward Victor Luckhoo
- 1976–1980 Joseph Oscar Fitzclarence Haynes
- 1980–1984 Victor E. Crane
- 1984–1988 Keith S. Massiah
- 1988–1995 Kenneth Montague George
- 1995–1996 Aubrey F. R. Bishop
- 1996–?2001 Cecil C Kennard
- 2001–2005 Désirée Bernard
- 2005–2017 Carl Ashok Singh (acting)
- 2017–present Yonette Cummings-Edwards (acting)

== Chief justices ==
- c.1826 Sergeant Rough (President of Court of Justice)
- 1821–1835 Charles Wray (President of Court of Justice)
- 1835–1836 John Walpole Willis (Vice-President of Court of Justice under Charles Wray)
- 1836–1852 Jeffery Hart Bent
- 1852–?1862 William Arrindell (died from fall, 1862)
- 1863–1868 John Beaumont
- 1868–1878 Sir William Snagg
- 1878–1895 David Patrick Chalmers
- 1895–1897 Sir Edward Loughlin O'Malley
- 1897–1901 Sir William James Smith
- 1902–1912 Sir Henry Alleyne Bovell
- 1912–1914 Sir Thomas Crossley Rayner (died in office)
- Albert Earnshaw (acting)
- Maurice Julian Berkeley (acting)
- 1914–1926 Sir Charles Major
- 1927–1934 Sir Anthony de Freitas
- 1934–1938 Sir Bernard Arthur Crean (afterwards Chief Justice of Cyprus, 1938)
- 1938–1942 Maurice Vincent Camacho
- 1942–1945 Sir John Verity
- 1947–1951 Sir Newnham Worley
- ?–1955 Sir (Edward) Peter Stubbs Bell (afterwards Chief Justice of Northern Rhodesia, 1955)
- 1955–1959 Frank William Holder
- 1958–?1960 Kenneth Sievewright Stoby
- 1960–1966 Sir Joseph Alexander Luckhoo
- 1966 Guyana became independent and Court of Appeal established.
- 1966–1980 Harold Bollers
- 1981–1988 Kenneth Montague George
- c.1990 Rudolph Harper
- 1995-1996 Cecil C Kennard
- 1996–2001 Désirée Bernard
- 2001–2015 Ian Chang (acting)
- 2015–2017 Yonette Cummings-Edwards (acting)
- 2017–present Roxane George-Wiltshire (acting)
