= Stuart Saunders (academic) =

South African academic (1931–2021)

Vice-Chancellor of the University of Cape Town
- In office 1981–1996
- Chancellor: Harry Oppenheimer
- Preceded by: Richard Luyt
- Succeeded by: Mamphela Ramphele

Personal details
- Born: 28 August 1931
- Died: 12 February 2021 (aged 89)
- Occupation: Medical doctor; academic

Stuart John Saunders (28 August 1931 – 12 February 2021) was a South African academic and vice-chancellor of the University of Cape Town from 1981 to 1996.

== Early life and education ==
Saunders was the son of Albert Frederick Saunders and Lilian Emily (née Roe), English immigrants to South Africa. He studied medicine at the University of Cape Town, graduating in 1953. He studied further to specialise in internal medicine with a fellowship to qualify with an MRCP.

== Academic career ==
He worked as a researcher under Malcolm Milne at the Postgraduate Medical School of London and with Kurt Isselbacher at the Harvard Medical School in Boston. He was then appointed to a full-time post in the University of Cape Town's department of medicine in 1961 and received his MD in 1965 for a thesis entitled ‘The effect of sugars on amino acid transport’.

Saunders founded a liver research group which later became the Medical Research Council/UCT liver research group (a medical-surgical partnership) that he co-directed with his physician colleague, Ralph Kirsch, and his surgical partner, John Terblanche. His best-known early work was on exchange transfusion in acute liver failure, with new avenues of research later encompassing the immunopathology of liver diseases, liver transplantation and the porphyrias.

He became professor and Chair of Medicine in 1971. He served as the senior vice president of the College of Medicine of South Africa from 1977 to 1980. Although a supporter of the medical profession, he was unafraid to criticise its shortcomings and resigned from the South African Medical Association in protest at its handling of the death of Steve Biko.

He was appointed vice-chancellor of the University of Cape Town in 1981. He is known for his opposition to Apartheid, and was president of the South African Institute of Race Relations from 1985 to 1986. As vice chancellor he violated the Group Areas Act by opening university's student housing to all students, regardless of ethnicity.

He founded the University of Cape Town Trust in the UK, and both founded and chaired the Tertiary Education Network until 2007. After retiring in 1996, he worked as a senior adviser to the Andrew W. Mellon Foundation of New York, and continued to work in the liver clinic at Groote Schuur Hospital. He also served for nine years on the Council of Higher Education and served on the board of the Claude Leon Foundation.

== Awards ==
He was awarded the Order of the Baobab (silver) by President Thabo Mbeki in 2002. He also received honorary degrees from the universities of Aberdeen, Sheffield, Rhodes, Princeton and Toronto.

== Personal life ==
Saunders married firstly Noreen Harrison, and secondly Anita Louw. He had two children. He died on 12 February 2021.

== Publications ==
His publications include:

- Vice-Chancellor on a Tightrope - A Personal Account of Climactic Years in South Africa (David Philip Publishers, Cape Town, 2000)

Academic offices
Preceded by Sir Richard Luyt	Vice-Chancellor of the University of Cape Town; 1981 – 1996	Succeeded by Mamphela Ramphele
