= Martin Zephyr =

Guyanese politician and lawyer

Speaker of the National Assembly of Guyana
- In office 23 October 2000 – 15 February 2001
- Preceded by: Derek Chunilall Jagan
- Succeeded by: Ralph Ramkarran

Personal details
- Born: 1 March 1931
- Died: 10 June 2009 (aged 78) United States
- Party: People's Progressive Party
- Occupation: lawyer

Winslow Martin Zephyr (1 March 1931 – 10 June 2009) was a Guyanese politician and lawyer. He served as Deputy Speaker of the National Assembly from 1998 to 2000. After the death of Derek Jagan, Zephyr was elected Speaker of the National Assembly of Guyana and served until 2001 He died in the United States on 10 June 2009.
