= Jane Phillips-Gay =

Afro-Guyanese trade unionist and ordained minister

Jane Phillips-Gay CCH
- 1953 election photograph
- Born: Jane Henrietta Phillips; 2 November 1913; Georgetown, British Guiana
- Died: 21 February 1994 (aged 80); Georgetown, Guyana
- Occupations: Trade unionist, minister, politician
- Years active: 1929–1970
- Known for: Workers' rights, women's and children's rights advocate

Jane Phillips-Gay CCH (2 November 1913 – 21 February 1994) was an Afro-Guyanese trade unionist and an ordained minister. She was an advocate of women's rights, formed one of the first women's political organizations in the country and served as one of the first women to be elected as a Member of British Guiana Parliament. She was recognized with the national service honor, the Cacique Crown of Honor in 1975.

== Early life ==
Jane Henrietta Phillips was born on 2 November 1913, in Georgetown, British Guiana, to James Adolphus Phillips She attended St. Ambrose Primary, Brickdam Roman Catholic School and Christ Church Anglican School, winning the primary school scholarship in 1925, which allowed her to continue her schooling. She attended Collegiate High School, completing her Junior Cambridge certification in 1929.

== Career ==
That same year, Phillips preached her first sermon, "Blessed are thou among women", at St. Stephens Church. She began preaching regularly and laid the foundation for her own church. In 1933, she was ordained as a Baptist preacher in Barbados. She joined the African Development Association, a Guyanese organization formed in 1938 to empower and improve the lives of Afro-Guyanese. In 1942, Phillips married Ivan Gay and affixed his surname to her own, becoming Phillips-Gay.

Labor disputes in the sugar industry of British Guiana had historically led to shootings on various plantations. One such incident at the Emerald plantation in the 1940s, led Phillips-Gay to seek out Joseph P. Lachmansingh, who would become the head of the Guiana Industrial Workers Union (GIWU) to try to understand the roots of the problem. He invited her to participate with him at a meeting on one of the plantations. She began working with Lachmansingh as a volunteer, visiting plantations throughout the colony and recording grievances and injuries of the cane workers. Phillips-Gay joined the Women's Political and Economic Organization (WPEO) when it formed in 1946. The first political organization of women in British Guiana, the group sought civic, economic and political parity for women. The following year, when the People's Progressive Party (PPP) formed she joined it as well.

In 1948, Phillips-Gay became the assistant general secretary of the GIWU and was an active participant in the Enmore strike, which resulted in workers being martyred for their involvement. The following year, Phillips-Gay, a recognized labor leader, became the general secretary of GIWU, with the responsibility of managing the organization. In 1953, she was one of the group of women of the PPP, who formed the Women's Progressive Organisation (WPO). That same year, she ran for a seat in the House of Assembly for the East Central Demerara district and successfully gained 63 percent of the sugar constituent's vote. Ironically, her voting base was predominantly Indo-Guyanese, while another successful politician in the race, Chandra Persaud, was elected by a predominantly Afro-Guyanese constituency. The election marked the first time women were allowed to vote, and Phillips-Gay, Janet Jagan and Jessica Burnham became the first three women elected to the parliament.

In 1955, the PPP split and Phillips-Gay joined the faction led by Forbes Burnham, which became the People's National Congress (PNC). She led an unsuccessful bid to keep her seat on the PNC ticket in 1957, and lost both subsequent attempts in 1961, and 1964. In 1957, she led the founding of the Women's Auxiliary of the PNC and served as the chair of the group for the next nineteen years. Phillips-Gay continued her community service work becoming involved in various measures aimed at protecting children and the elderly, as well as continuing her efforts with workers and the unemployed. Her work with women’s organizations expanded region wide and in 1970, she helped found Caribbean Women’s Association (CARIWA). In 1975, she was awarded Guyana's second highest national honor, the Cacique Crown of Honor (CCH).

== Death and legacy ==
Phillips-Gay died on 21 February 1994 in Georgetown. At the time of her death, the legislature recognized her commitment to her service to the nation and she is remembered each International Women's Day for her contributions.
