= List of speakers of the National Assembly of Guyana =

Speaker of the National Assembly of Guyana
- Incumbent; Manzoor Nadir since 1 September 2020
- Style: The Honourable; Mr. Speaker; Comrade Speaker
- Appointer: Members of the National Assembly of Guyana
- Term length: During the life of the National Assembly (usually 5 years)
- Constituting instrument: Article 56 of the Constitution of Guyana
- Precursor: Legislature of British Guiana
- Inaugural holder: Aubrey Percival Alleyne (1966–1967)
- Formation: 1966 (as the National Assembly of Guyana)
- Deputy: Deputy Speaker of the National Assembly
- Website: parliament.gov.gy

The Speaker is the presiding officer of the National Assembly in Guyana. The post was created in 1966 when the National Assembly came into being, although previous legislatures including the Legislative Council, House of Assembly, and the Legislative Assembly also had Speakers.

The position of Speaker was introduced in 1953 following constitutional reforms that created the House of Assembly. The Speaker was initially appointed by the Governor, but following the 1961 constitutional reforms, was elected by members of the legislature. The first elected Speaker, Rahman Baccus Gajraj, was not a member of the Legislative Assembly. The second, Aubrey Percival Alleyne, was a member of the House of Assembly, and after election as Speaker, resigned from his role as an elected member and was replaced by the next person on the party's list.

The Speaker initially wore a full-bottomed wig and ceremonial gown, with the practice ceasing in 1969. The Speaker's Chair was a gift from the Government of India on 15 November 1966 to celebrate Guyanese independence.

== List of speakers ==
Name	Entered office	Left office	Notes
House of Assembly
Eustace Gordon Woolford	7 April 1953	21 December 1953	
Interim Legislative Council
Eustace Gordon Woolford	5 January 1954	29 June 1957	
Legislative Council
Donald Edward Jackson	21 August 1957	18 July 1961	
Legislative Assembly
Rahman Baccus Gajraj	5 October 1961	25 September 1964	
House of Assembly
Aubrey Percival Alleyne	31 December 1964	26 May 1966	
National Assembly
Aubrey Percival Alleyne	26 May 1966	4 August 1967	
Rahman Baccus Gajraj	16 February 1968	4 January 1971	
Sase Narain	4 January 1971	10 June 1992	
Derek Chunilall Jagan	17 December 1992	15 October 2000	
Martin Zephyr	23 October 2000	15 February 2001	
Hari Narayen Ramkaran	4 May 2001	12 January 2012	
Raphael Trotman	12 January 2012	10 June 2015	
Barton Scotland	10 June 2015	1 September 2020	
Manzoor Nadir	1 September 2020	Incumbent	

== Note ==
- Jagan died in office. Deputy speaker, Clarissa Riehl, served as acting speaker 15–23 October 2000 until a successor was elected.
