= Henry Wray =

British Army general

Lieutenant-General Henry Wray CMG
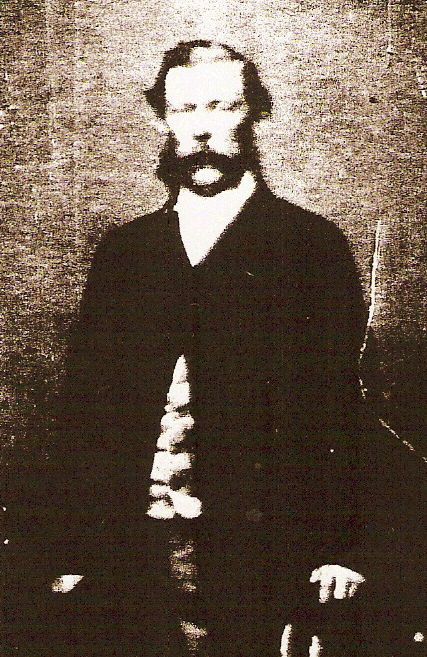
- Born: 1 January 1826; Demerara (Now Guyana)
- Died: 6 April 1900 (aged 74)
- Military career
- Allegiance: United Kingdom
- Branch: British Army
- Rank: Lieutenant-General
- Awards: Companion of the Order of St Michael and St George

Lieutenant-General Henry Wray CMG (1 January 1826 – 6 April 1900) was a Royal Engineers officer who arrived in Fremantle on 12 December 1851 and was responsible for carrying out the construction plans for Fremantle Prison for Edmund Henderson.

== Military career ==
Henry Wray was born in Demerara, now Guyana on 1 January 1826. The son of Charles Wray, Chief Justice of Demerara, Wray graduated from the Royal Military Academy at Woolwich as second lieutenant in 1843. Postings in Ireland and Gibraltar followed, and Wray's abilities as an engineer soon saw him promoted to first lieutenant in 1846. Married in 1848 to Mary Drinkwater, the daughter of eminent historian Thomas Drinkwater, Wray then moved back to Woolwich in 1850.

In 1851 he was selected to travel to Western Australia with the 20th Company of Royal Sappers and Miners. After arrival he was appointed as a magistrate to the colony, and given responsibility for the construction of the Convict Establishment (now Fremantle Prison), based upon designs by Edmund Henderson.

Wray personally designed many buildings, bridges and roads in the Perth area, and in April 1854 was promoted to rank of Second Captain. Around this time The Royal Engineers left to serve in the Crimean War, but Wray remained and was promoted to First Captain.

After Henderson's departure in 1856, Wray succeeded him as acting comptroller general of convicts. After serving in the position for two years, he was described in a letter from the governor of Western Australia Arthur Edward Kennedy as "a most exemplary and industrious officer who has for many months done the work of several".

Henry Wray left Australia on 2 January 1858 to return to England. In 1860 he was commissioned to help determine the boundary between British Honduras (Belize) and Guatemala. This was a difficult undertaking that saw him injured several times by both nature and natives. By this time he had been promoted to the local rank of major. After the signing of the Anglo-Japanese Friendship Treaty, he was then in 1864 posted to Japan with a company of sappers.

Wray returned to England in 1865 becoming chief royal engineer at Chatham. He published several works on engineering that were to reform teaching methods in the field. After several years he became chief royal engineer in Malta, and was involved in several military and civil engineering projects before moving to Ireland in 1879 for 7 years. He was appointed a Companion of the Order of St Michael and St George (CMG) in 1879. Promoted to major-general on 26 April 1882, Wray became Lieutenant Governor of Jersey until his retirement in 1887, when he received the honorary rank of lieutenant-general. He died from pneumonia at Bournemouth on 6 April 1900, aged 74.

Government offices
| Preceded by Sir Lothian Nicholson | Lieutenant Governor of Jersey; 1883–1887 | Succeeded by Charles Ewart |
