= Ralph Ramkarran =

Guyanese politician and lawyer

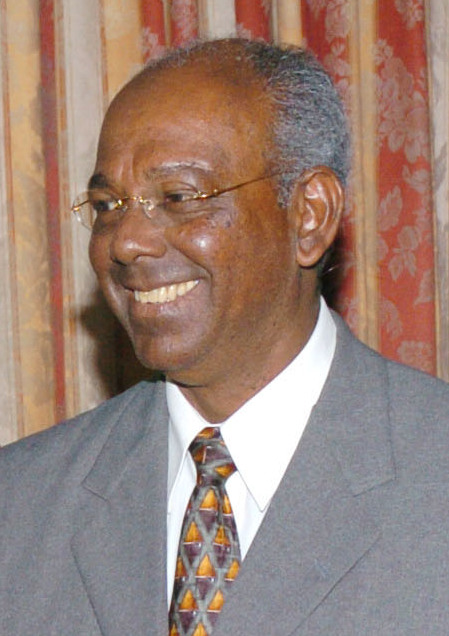
- Ramkarran in 2006

Speaker of the National Assembly of Guyana
- In office 4 May 2001 – 2011
- Preceded by: Martin Zephyr
- Succeeded by: Raphael Trotman

Personal details
- Born: 11 August 1946 (age 79)
- Party: A New and United Guyana
- Occupation: lawyer

Hari Narayen Ramkaran (born 11 August 1946), known as Ralph Ramkarran, is a Guyanese politician and lawyer. He served as Speaker of the National Assembly of Guyana from 2001 to 2011.

== Biography ==
He attended Bel Air Primary school, Central High School and Queen's College. After his high school education, he then went on to the UK to study law. Ramkarran qualified as a lawyer in 1972 in the United Kingdom as a member of Gray's Inn and returned to Guyana the following year when he entered into private practice. In 1977, he joined the law firm of Cameron & Shepherd, which is now Guyana's oldest and largest law firm. He is currently the firm's Senior Partner. He became a Senior Counsel of Guyana's judiciary in 1996.

Ramkarran has spoken and lectured widely on behalf of the People's Progressive Party (PPP) in Guyana and was the editor of its official journal, the Thunder, between 1992 and 2002. He was elected to the PPP's Central and Executive Committees in 1974 and 1975. He was elected to the Council of the Guyana Bar Association in 1979 and served for twelve years as Treasurer, Assistant Secretary and Secretary.

In 1994 he was elected as the Guyana Facilitator to the United Nations Good Officer Process under the Geneva Agreement relating to the Guyana-Venezuela Border controversy.

His father, Boysie Ramkarran, served as British Guiana's, Minister of Works and Communications in the 1957/61 PPP government and immediately after that Boysie Ramkarran served as Minister of Works and Hydraulics in the 1961/1964 PPP government and he was also the General Secretary of GAWU between 1975 and 1985.

On 29 June 2012, at an executive party meeting Ramkarran proclaimed he received many hostilities as a result of an article he wrote about corruption. After being, in his own words "gratuitously and irrelevantly accused of being untrustworthy", he declared that "after forty years in the leadership of the PPP, such an accusation was about as much as I could bear." The following day, he resigned from the PPP.
