= Deborah Backer =

Guyanese politician (1959–2014)

- Born: 14 April 1959
- Died: 21 March 2014 (aged 54)
- Education: University of the West Indies, Barbados (LLB, 1981); Hugh Wooding Law School
- Title: Deputy Speaker of the National Assembly of Guyana

Deborah Backer (14 April 1959 – 21 March 2014) was a Guyanese politician of the People's National Congress who served as the deputy speaker of the National Assembly of Guyana.

== Early life ==
Born on 14 April 1959, Backer received her LLB degree from University of the West Indies, Barbados in 1981 and attended the Hugh Wooding Law School for her legal education certificate.

== Career ==
Backer started her career as a lawyer and was a member of the Guyana Bar Association. After joining the People's National Congress (PNC) in 1994, she served on the Georgetown city council till 1998. She was elected to the National Assembly of Guyana for the first time in 1998. Later she became its deputy speaker. For the 2011 general elections, PNC together with other parties formed an alliance A Partnership for National Unity and became the opposition in the next assembly. Backer was their shadow foreign affairs minister and also headed the Parliamentary Sectorial Committees. However she resigned from the house in February 2014, owing to her poor health.

== Personal life ==
Backer was married with two children. She died on 21 March 2014, after a brief illness. President of Guyana Donald Ramotar also attended her funeral.
