= Manzoor Nadir =

Speaker of the National Assembly of Guyana

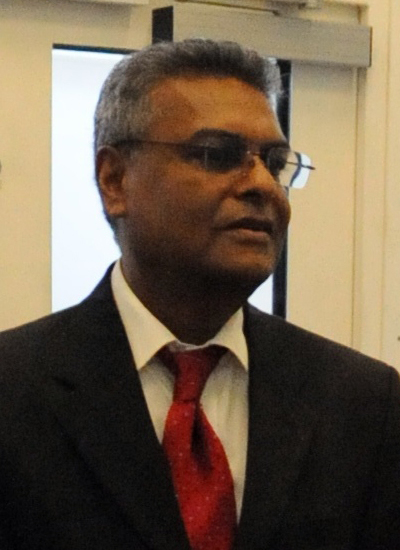
- Nadir in 2010

Speaker of the National Assembly
- Incumbent
- Assumed office 1 September 2020
- Preceded by: Barton Scotland

Personal details
- Born: 14 November 1955 (age 70) Albouystown, Georgetown, British Guiana
- Party: People's Progressive Party/Civic
- Spouse: Maria Nadir
- Children: 3
- Occupation: Politician, economist

Manzoor Nadir (14 November 1955) is a Guyanese politician and Speaker of the National Assembly. Nadir was the Guyanese Minister of Labour and party leader of The United Force between 2001 and 2011.

== Biography ==
Mazoon Nadir was born to an Indo-Guyanese family in Albouystown, Georgetown on 14 November 1955. He holds a master's degree in economics from the University of Manchester, and the Bachelor of Commerce degree from the University of Alberta. Nadir is an economist by profession.

Nadir was first elected to the National Assembly in 1992. Nadir served as the Minister of Labour from 2001 until 2011. Nadir became the party leader of The United Force in 2001 and served until 2011. On 1 September 2020, Nadir was elected Speaker of the National Assembly without contest. Lenox Shuman was elected as Deputy Speaker.

As of 19 September 2022, Nadir remains Guyana's Speaker of the National Assembly.
