= Philomena Sahoye-Shury =

Guyanese trade unionist and politician (1931–2022)

Member of the National Assembly
- In office 3 January 1969 – December 1971
- In office 1998–2011

Personal details
- Born: 13 October 1931
- Died: 2 October 2022 (aged 90)
- Political party: People's Progressive Party
- Spouse: Vibert Shury
- Children: 3
- Occupation: Trade unionist; politician

Philomena Sahoye-Shury (13 October 1931 – 2 October 2022) was a Guyanese trade unionist and politician. She served as MP from 1969 to 1971 and from 1998 to 2011, and she was also general secretary of the Guyana Agricultural and General Workers' Union (GAWU).

== Biography ==
=== Early life and career ===
Sahoye-Shury was born on 13 October 1931. She entered the workforce as a nurse. She cited Janet Jagan and her husband Cheddi Jagan, specifically a speech she heard from the former while in her twenties, as having inspired her to go into politics. In 1964, Sahoye-Shury became general secretary of the Guyana Agricultural and General Workers' Union, where she earned the nickname Fireball due to her "outspoken and forthright stance on the workers' behalf".

On 16 June 1964, amidst the Union's sugar worker strike, Sahoye-Shury and Progressive Youth Organisation of Guyana secretary Neville Annibourne were arrested by British Guiana colonial police while on the run for several days. Authorities later charged her and union leader Harry Lall with inciting violence. During her incarceration in New Amsterdam Prison, she occupied the same cell as Janet Jagan. Leslie Ramsammy, a close friend of hers since childhood, recalled in his column Ramsammy's Ruminations that "being locked up and whisked away to mystery Police stations were regular things for Philo". She later fled to Canada in exile, before eventually returning to Guyana.

=== Later life and political career ===
A member of the People's Progressive Party, she entered the National Assembly as an MP on 3 January 1969 and served there until December 1971. In 1992, she became deputy mayor of Georgetown. In 1995, she was considered for the mayor of Georgetown, but this did not materialize due to opposition from the A Partnership for National Unity/Alliance for Change coalition; President Donald Ramotar specifically blamed the People's National Congress for not allowing the position to rotate to her.

She later served as an MP from 1998 to 2011. She worked as parliamentary secretary at the Ministry of Local Government (1998–2001) and the Ministry of Housing and Water (2001–2011). She was National Director of the Community Development Council, where she "promote[d] women in small enterprises and [built] vocational capacity among women's groups across Guyana", until Joseph Harmon fired her in 2015 following the APNU+AFC's victory in the 2015 Guyanese general election.

=== Personal life and death ===
She married Vibert Shury and had three children, including a daughter.

In 2011, she suffered several attacks at her Georgetown home and workplace. There were two Molotov cocktail attacks on her home in January and December, both resulting in no damage. Her office was also attacked with kerosene in March.

Sahoye-Shury died on 2 October 2022. Tributes came from president of Guyana Irfaan Ali and GAWU president Seepaul Narine.
