= Raphael Trotman =

Guyanese lawyer and politician

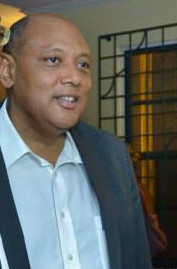
- Trotman in 2014

Speaker of the National Assembly of Guyana
- In office 12 January 2012 – 10 June 2015
- Preceded by: Hari Narayen Ramkaran
- Succeeded by: Barton Scotland

Personal details
- Born: 1966 (age 59–60)
- Party: Alliance For Change (AFC)
- Other political affiliations: People's National Congress (Until 2005)

Raphael Trotman (born 1966) is a Guyanese lawyer and politician. He was the Speaker of the National Assembly of Guyana from 2011 to 2015. He was the country's Minister for Natural Resources from 2015 to 2020.

A former executive member of the People's National Congress Reform, Trotman co-founded the Alliance For Change (AFC) in 2005 along with Khemraj Ramjattan and Sheila Holder. Officially launched on 29 October 2005, the AFC received 8.3% of the national vote and won 5 of the 65 seats in the August 2006 elections, becoming the third-largest political party in Guyana.

Trotman was initially elected to Parliament in 1998 as a member of the People's National Congress Reform. Trotman resigned the PNCR on 27 May 2005 but did not resign his Parliamentary seat until 27 December 2005, well after the launch of his new political party.

In the 2006 elections, Trotman was his party's presidential candidate.
