= Order of Excellence of Guyana =

Highest national award of Guyana

Awarded by Guyana
- Type: State Order
- Established: 1970
- Eligibility: Citizens of Guyana; others may receive an honorary award.
- Awarded for: Distinction and eminence in any field of endeavour of national or international importance.
- Status: Currently constituted.
- Chancellor: President of Guyana
- Grades: Member (OE)

Precedence
- Next (higher): none
- Next (lower): Order of Roraima of Guyana
- Ribbon of the order

The Order of Excellence of Guyana is the highest national award of Guyana. Established in 1970 under the Constitution of the Orders of Guyana, it is limited to 25 living citizens of Guyana. This is the highest award of the state and is given to citizens of Guyana for distinction and eminence in the field of human endeavor which is of either national or international significance and importance. Any distinguished citizen of another country who has rendered valued service to Guyana or whom the state wishes to honour for any reason, may be given an honorary award.

== Recipients ==
=== Honorary members ===
- Narendra Modi, Prime Minister of India

== See also ==
- Orders, decorations, and medals of Guyana
