= Gail Teixeira =

Guyanese politician (born 1952)

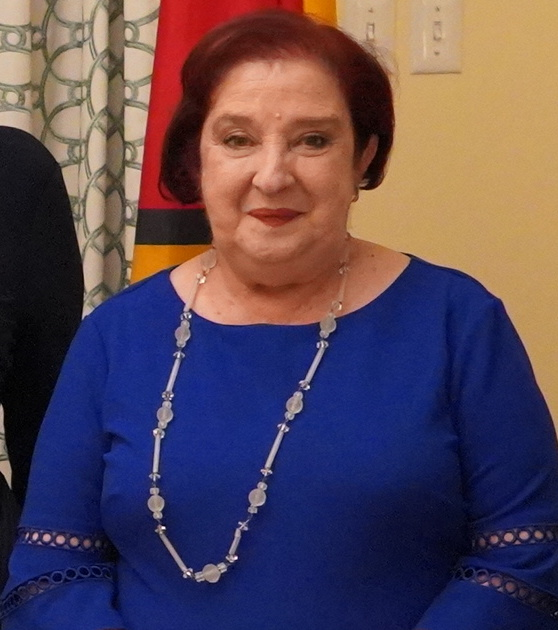
- Teixeira in 2022

Minister of Parliamentary Affairs and Governance of Guyana
- Incumbent
- Assumed office 5 August 2020

Personal details
- Born: 18 July 1952 (age 74)
- Party: People's Progressive Party
- Education: University of Toronto; York University
- Occupation: Politician

Gail Teixeira (born 18 July 1952) is a Guyanese politician, who began her career with the People's Progressive Party (PPP) in 1976. Since August 2020, she has held the office of minister of parliamentary affairs and governance in Guyana.

== Education and career ==
Gail Teixeira attended the University of Toronto, where she studied History and International Relations, receiving her bachelor's degree in 1974. She later attended York University and obtained a Master of Arts degree in Political Science.

Teixeira started her political career as the People's Progressive Party Secretary in 1976. During that period, she was the Women's Progressive Organisation's personal secretary to President Cheddi Jagan. Between 1977 and 1992, Teixeira was a member of the National Assembly. After a long tenure as MP, she was appointed senior minister of health for the Guyanese government. Teixeira subsequently served as the Guyana minister of culture, youth and sports.

On 5 August 2020, she was appointed minister of parliamentary affairs and governance by President Irfaan Ali.
