= Chief Justice of Bermuda =

The chief justice of Bermuda is the senior judge of the Supreme Court of Bermuda.

== Chief justices ==
- Larry Mussenden
- 2018–present Narinder Hargun
- 2012–2018 Ian Kawaley
- 2004–2012 Richard Ground
- 1993-2004 Sir Austin Ward
- 1977-1993 Sir James Rufus Astwood
- 1973–1977 Sir John Crampton Summerfield (later Chief Justice of the Cayman Islands, 1978)
- 1968–1973 Sir George Oswald Ratteray
- 1961–1968 Sir Myles John Abbott
- 1960–1961 Sir Allen C. Smith (acting)
- 1958–1960 Sir Newnham Arthur Worley
- 1952–1958 Joseph Trounsell Gilbert
- 1941–1952 Sir Cyril Gerard Brooke Francis
- 1939–1941 R. C. Hollis Hallett (acting)
- 1927–1939 Sydney Orme Rowan-Hamilton
- 1924–1927 Sir Kenneth James Beatty
- 1917–1923 Sir Colin Rees-Davies
- 1912–1917 Percy Musgrave Cresswell Sheriff
- 1904–1911 Sir Henry Cowper Gollan (afterwards Attorney General of Trinidad and Tobago, 1911)
- 1900–1904 Sir Samuel Brownlow Gray
- 1878–1899 Sir Josiah Rees
- 1872–1877 Thomas Lett Wood
- 1856–1871 John Harvey Darrell
- 1834–1856 Thomas Butterfield
- 1810–1834 James Christie Esten
- 1785–1809 Daniel Leonard
- 1783–1785 John Harvey
- 1781–1782 William Brimage
- 1766–1781 Jonathan Burch
- 1755–1765 Nathaniel Butterfield
- 1750–1755 George Forbes
- 1748–1749 John Tucker
- 1744–1748 Nathaniel Bascombe
- 1735–1743 John Darrell
- 1727–1735 William Outerbridge
- 1709–1727 Samuel Sherlock
- 1706–1708 Anthony White
- ?–1706 Richard Stafford
- c.1705 Samuel Spofforth
- c.1695 Gilbert Nelson
- 1687–? Thomas Richardson
- William Penistone
- Leonard White
