= Richard Luyt =

Colonial Governor of British Guiana in 1964–66 (1915–1994)

Sir Richard Luyt GCMG KCVO DCM
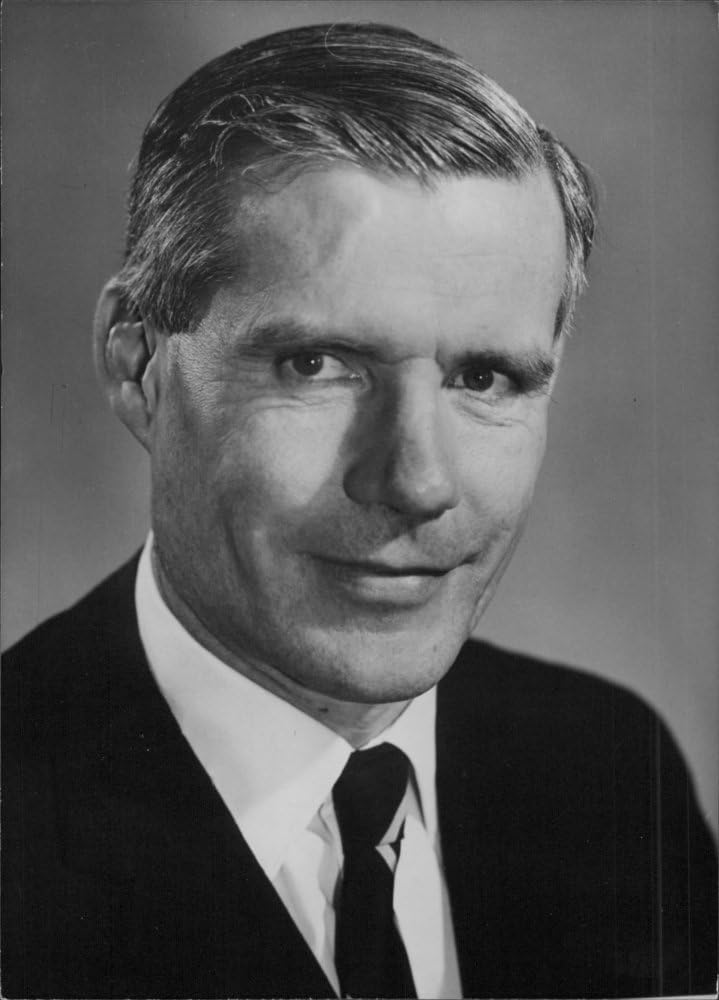

1st Governor General of Guyana
- In office 26 May 1966 – 16 December 1966
- Monarch: Elizabeth II
- Prime Minister: Forbes Burnham
- Preceded by: Office established
- Succeeded by: David Rose

Governor of British Guiana
- In office 7 March 1964 – 26 May 1966
- Monarch: Elizabeth II
- Prime Minister: Forbes Burnham
- Preceded by: Sir Ralph Grey
- Succeeded by: himself as Governor-General of Guyana

Vice-Chancellor of University of Cape Town
- In office 1967–1980
- Chancellor: Harry Oppenheimer
- Preceded by: Jacobus Duminy
- Succeeded by: Stuart J Saunders

Personal details
- Born: 8 November 1915 Cape Town, Union of South Africa
- Died: 12 February 1994 (aged 78) Cape Town, South Africa
- Spouse(s): Joan Mary Wilder (d. 1951); Eileen Betty Reid (m. 1956)
- Children: 3
- Education: University of Cape Town; Trinity College, Oxford

Sir Richard Edmonds Luyt GCMG KCVO DCM (8 November 1915 – 12 February 1994) was a South African born colonial administrator and university vice-chancellor who served as the last Governor of British Guiana from 1964 to 1966 and as vice-chancellor of the University of Cape Town from 1967 to 1980.

== Biography ==
=== Early life and education ===
Richard Edmonds Luyt was born in Cape Town in the Union of South Africa on 8 November 1915. He was educated at Diocesan College before attending the University of Cape Town.

Luyt obtained a Rhodes Scholarship to attend Trinity College at the University of Oxford. While at Oxford, Luyt was an excellent cricketer and rugby player. He obtained a Rugby Blue, and played in three first-class cricket matches for Oxford University Cricket Club.

=== Service in Africa ===
In 1939, following his graduation from the University of Oxford, Luyt joined the colonial service and was assigned to a minor posting in Northern Rhodesia (now Zambia). With the outbreak of World War II, Luyt became a private in the British Army. In 1940, as a sergeant, Luyt commanded a guerrilla company behind Italian lines in Ethiopia in the East African campaign. Luyt was awarded the Distinguished Conduct Medal. Luyt became a commissioned officer, and by the end of the war held the rank of lieutenant colonel.

Following World War II, Luyt returned to Northern Rhodesia, where he remained until 1953 when he was assigned to Kenya. He was awarded a knighthood as a Knight of the Royal Victorian Order in 1960. In 1961, with the withdrawal of South Africa from the Commonwealth, Luyt became a British subject rather than a South African citizen. In 1961, he became secretary to the Kenyan cabinet, and in 1962 he returned to Northern Rhodesia.

=== Governor of British Guiana ===
Luyt was appointed Governor of British Guiana on 7 March 1964. Luyt entered British Guiana at a time with widespread violence between Afro-Guyanese and Indo-Guyanese groups (and their associated political parties, the PNC and the PPP). Elections were to be held in late 1964 with independence following soon after. The objective of the British and American interests in the area was to prevent Indo-Guyanese Cheddi Jagan, perceived to be a communist, from becoming elected as the first head of government of an independent Guyana. In the lead-up to the 1964 elections, the CIA interfered heavily in Guyanese politics, with the cooperation of British authorities including Luyt. The Guiana United Muslim Party and Justice Party were both set up with the assistance of the CIA to split the Indo-Guyanese voting bloc, and the United States funded the campaign of Forbes Burnham campaign activities against Jagan's party. Just three days before Luyt's appointment, on 4 March, a bomb went off at Tain, killing two people, and a strike was ongoing called by the Guyana Agricultural and General Workers' Union. The day before Luyt was sworn in, an Indo-Guyanese woman was run over by an Afro-Guyanese man in a tractor near Leonora.

The PPP objected to the swearing-in of Luyt as governor, and refused to attend the ceremony. On 26 March, Luyt was given powers over regulation of voter registration. The racial violence worsened, eventually leading to Luyt declaring a state of emergency on 23 May 1964, with British soldiers being brought into Guyana to stop the violence, with Luyt being accused of being partisan to the PNC. On 29 May, Luyt's emergency powers were greatly extended. The election was scheduled for December 1964. In the lead-up to the election, there was civil disorder and violence was common from both PPP and PNC supporters. Nearly 200 people were murdered and 1000 were injured, and more than 15,000 people were displaced. Racial violence included the fatal shooting of an elderly Afro-Guyanese couple on their farm, the death of a pregnant Indo-Guyanese woman at Bachelor's Adventure near Enterprise and the deaths of four Indo-Guyanese at Afro-Guyanese hands in Wismar. Further violence included the sinking of the Sun Chapman on 6 July and the murders of 5 Indo-Guyanese at Mackenzie. On 13 June, Luyt imprisoned 30 or 32 Indo-Guyanese individuals for violent offenses. These individuals, imprisoned at Mazaruni Prison, would not be released until 1966, and caused great friction between Luyt's administration and Cheddi Jagan. This included some legislators, making the PPP a minority in the Legislative Assembly. Only two PNC members were imprisoned on similar charges. On 23 June, the constitution was amended to allow the elections to be held under proportional representation, which would be favourable for the PNC. The governor also passed firearm ordinances, granted immunity to British troops, and restricted some publications against the PNC with a punishment of six months in prison for unauthorised possession.

Voter registration was altered by Luyt from house-to-house to voluntary registration, with a period of only 4 weeks (from 8 May to 6 June). This led to difficulties for voter registration in rural areas (mostly Indo-Guyanese) and for people recently displaced by violence. On 2 December, just days before the elections, Luyt announced that he would not necessarily appoint the leader of the party with the largest number of votes as premier. Cheddi Jagan objected to the announcement, saying that the question could influence the electorate and amounted to election interference.

The December 1964 elections saw Cheddi Jagan's PPP win a plurality of votes. However, they did not achieve an outright majority, and Forbes Burnham's People's National Congress, together with the support of the United Force, were able to attain a majority of seats in parliament, and together as a coalition were invited to form a government by Luyt. Jagan refused to resign and Luyt was forced to remove him, with a constitutional change necessary to do so because the PPP had not technically lost the elections, still being the party with the largest independent share of parliamentary seats. Commonwealth observers raised concerns about the fairness of some aspects of the election.

Deadly riots ensued when the PPP was not allowed to form the government. Upon independence in May 1966, Sir Richard was sworn in as Governor-General of Guyana, a position which he held until December the same year.

=== University administrator ===
Having been born and educated in Cape Town, he returned there in 1967 as principal and vice-chancellor of the University of Cape Town, a post which he held until 1980. Because of his actions in British Guiana, his appointment was initially opposed by the student body but he soon won them over. During this period, at the height of the apartheid years in South Africa, academic freedom was under threat and Sir Richard was in the forefront of South African vice-chancellors who fought to protect these freedoms. He also vigorously objected against banning orders and detention without trial of students and staff who protested against apartheid.

== Personal life ==
Luyt was married to Joan Mary Wilder until her death in 1951, four months after giving birth to a daughter. Luyt married Eileen Betty Reid in 1956, with whom he had two sons.

== Legacy ==
An award named after Luyt was given to one of the two-highest achieving students at the University of Cape Town from 1991 to 2009. In 2009, the Sir Richard Luyt Memorial Scholarship was renamed to become a part of the Kerry Capstick-Dale student leadership awards.

Government offices
Preceded by Ralph Grey	Governor of British Guiana; 1964–1966	Office abolished
Office established	Governor-General of Guyana; 1966	Succeeded by David Rose
Academic offices
Preceded by Jacobus Duminy	Vice-Chancellor of the University of Cape Town; 1968–1980	Succeeded by Stuart Saunders
