= Winston Murray (Guyanese politician) =

Guyanese politician (1941–2010)

Winston Shripal Murray

Deputy Prime Minister of Guyana
- In office 1985–1992

Personal details
- Died: 23 November 2010
- Party: People's National Congress (Guyana)

Winston Shripal Murray (31 January 1941 – 22 November 2010) was a Guyanese politician and who was Deputy Prime Minister of Guyana from 1985 to 1992. He was a member of the People's National Congress party, serving as its shadow minister for finance at the time of his death.
