= David Rose (Guyanese politician) =

Governor-General of Guyana from 1966 to 1969

Sir David Rose GCMG CVO MBE CPM

2nd Governor-General of Guyana
- In office 16 December 1966 – 10 November 1969
- Monarch: Elizabeth II
- Prime Minister: Forbes Burnham
- Preceded by: Sir Richard Luyt; Sir Kenneth Sievewright Stoby (acting)
- Succeeded by: Sir Edward Luckhoo

Personal details
- Born: David James Gardiner Rose; 10 April 1923 Mahaica, British Guiana (now Guyana)
- Died: 10 November 1969 (aged 46) London, England
- Resting place: Georgetown, Guyana

Sir David James Gardiner Rose GCMG CVO MBE CPM (10 April 1923 – 10 November 1969) was Governor-General of Guyana from 1966 to 1969.

== Biography ==
Rose was born in Mahaica in British Guiana on 10 April 1923, and was educated at Mount St Mary's College in England. Returning to British Guiana in 1948, following World War II, the newly wed Rose joined the colonial police force and later became Assistant Commissioner of Police (Crime). In 1960-61 he was appointed as defence officer to the Federal Government of the West Indies Federation in Trinidad. Following the breakup of the Federation, between 1964 and 1966, he was the Administrator of Antigua. He was then transferred to a newly independent Guyana, where he served as Governor General from 1966 to 1969.

He was killed in an accident while visiting London to relinquish his post. He had been luncheoning at the West Indian Club, Whitehall Court, when some scaffolding fell onto his car, killing him.

The honours he received included the Colonial Police Medal with bar for gallantry, and the highest award of Guyana, the Order of Excellence, which was awarded posthumously in 1970.

He was the first to be buried at the Place of Heroes inside the Botanical Gardens in Georgetown, Guyana.

Government offices
Preceded by Sir Richard Luyt	Governor General of Guyana; 1966 – 1969	Succeeded by Sir Edward Luckhoo
