= Orders, decorations, and medals of Guyana =

The Orders, decorations, and medals of Guyana were established after Guyana gained independence from the United Kingdom as a replacement for the British honours system, which was last conferred in the 1970 New Year Honours on Guyanese citizens.

In February 1970, Guyana became a republic and established its first two national awards under the Constitution of the Orders of Guyana. In 1976, the Constitution of the Orders of Guyana was amended to add a third national award.

The first appointments to the Orders of Guyana came in 1970 and were presented through 2002. After a period of several years the first new appointments were made in 2011. New appointments are made on the Anniversary of the Independence of the Republic of Guyana, by the President of Guyana, acting in his capacity as the Chancellor of the Orders of Guyana.

== Order of Excellence of Guyana ==
The Order of Excellence of Guyana (OE) is the highest national award of Guyana. Sir David Rose, Governor-General of Guyana was amongst the recipients, albeit posthumously. Established in 1970 under the Constitution of the Orders of Guyana it is limited to twenty five living citizens of Guyana.

== Order of Roraima of Guyana ==
The Order of Roraima of Guyana (OR) is the second highest National Award of Guyana, and is limited to only thirty five living Guyanese recipients. Established in 1976, it may be awarded to any citizen of Guyana who has given outstanding service to the nation. Citizens of foreign nations who are deemed eligible may be honoured as honorary members of the order.

== Order of Service of Guyana ==
The Order of Service of Guyana is the third ranking order of Guyana. It consists of three awards that are divided into general awards and special awards. Citizens of foreign countries may be presented with an Honorary Award under the Order of Service of Guyana for acts of service or exceptional achievements which benefit Guyana. If a recipient is presented with a higher award within the order, they are to return the insignia of the lower award and only wear the insignia and ribbon of the higher award. Recipients only use the postnominal letters of the highest award after their name.

=== General Awards ===
==== The Cacique Crown of Honour ====
The Cacique Crown of Honour (CCH) is the second highest award in the Order of Service of Guyana. It is limited to fifty citizens of Guyana. It may be awarded to any citizen of Guyana who has "rendered service of an exceptionally high quality beyond the normal call.

Note: This award is also given posthumously duty in the public service, social and voluntary services, industry or trade unions, or in any other area of public service, or achieved excellence of national or international standing and recognition in the arts, professions, sciences or sport or in any other area of activity." It may also be awarded to institutions, organisations, corporations or a group of people who have made substantial contributions to the national economy, for achievements of a significant advance resulting in increased efficiency, for applying technology to production or development process in industry, or for other significant achievements and contributions to national development. The president awarded the Cacique Crown of Honour to ten citizens in 1970 and two citizens every year, after that, as long as the vacancy exists.

==== The Golden Arrow of Achievement ====
The Golden Arrow of Achievement (AA) is the fourth highest award in the Order of Service of Guyana. It may be awarded also to "any citizen of Guyana who has performed an outstanding and specific act of service or achievement of an exceptional nature, or is given for long and dedicated service of a consistently high standard in responsible offices, local government services, social and voluntary services, industry or trade unions, or in any other area of public service." It may also be awarded to institutions, organisations, corporations or a group of people under similar conditions to the Cacique's Crown of Honour.

==== The Medal of Service ====
The Medal of Service (MS) is the fifth highest award of the Order of Service of Guyana. It is awarded for ten years of dedicated public service, local government service, service to industry, service to trade unions or other areas of service to the community.

=== Special awards ===
==== Cacique's Crown of Valour ====
The Cacique's Crown of Valour (CCV) is the highest award of the Order of Service of Guyana. The Cacique's Crown of Valour is awarded for high acts of bravery involving great danger and serious risk to life.

==== Golden Arrow of Courage ====
The Golden Arrow of Courage (AC) is the second highest award for bravery. It ranks as the third highest award of the Order of Service of Guyana. It is awarded for acts of bravery of a lesser degree than those recognized by the Cacique's Crown of Valour.

==== President's Commendation for Brave Conduct ====
The President's Commendation for Brave Conduct is awarded for lesser acts of bravery, but still deserving of government recognition. This award is not recognized with a medal, but by a miniature Guyana leaf in gold. Recipients also receive a citation signed by the President.

== Order of Service for Military Service and for service in the Police, Prisons and Fire Services ==
The Order of Service for Military Service and for service in the Police, Prisons and Fire Services is presented to members of the Guyana Defence Force and the disciplined services of Guyana.

=== Military service ===
==== Military Service Star ====
The Military Service Star (MSS) is the highest award presented for military service to officers of the Guyana Defence Force, the Guyana People's Militia and the Guyana National Service. It may be awarded for exceptional service, above and beyond the call of duty or for gallantry in action.

==== Military Service Medal ====
The Military Service Medal (MSM) is presented for military service to members of the Guyana Defence Force, the Guyana People's Militia and the Guyana National Service. It may be awarded for exceptional service, above and beyond the call of duty or for gallantry in action.

==== Military Efficiency Medal ====
The Efficiency Medal is awarded to officers and other ranks of the Guyana Defence Force, the Guyana People's Militia and the Guyana National Service who complete ten years of efficient service.

The Military Efficiency Medal is awarded to serving members of the GDF, who would have completed 10 years of continuous service with good conduct, and are approved by the Chief of Staff, following recommendations by the Medal Awards Committee.

On the obverse of the Medal is the Cacique's Crown (an Amerindian head dress) in the centre, which is encircled by the inscription of Guyana's motto, ”One People, One Nation, One Destiny Guyana” while the reverse has two crossed swords and the words ‘Military Efficiency Medal’ inscribed.

==== Border Defence Medal ====
The Border Defence Medal is awarded to serving members of the army and the police force, who would have had cumulative service on a Border location in excess of one year, and are approved by the Chief of Staff and Commissioner of Police, following recommendations by the Medal Awards Committee.

On the obverse of that Medal is the Cacique's Crown in the centre, which is encircled also by an inscription, of Guyana's national motto. On the reverse, there is a circular image of Mount Ayanganna on which is planted the Golden Arrowhead, while at the base of the Mount Ayanganna are bushes and water.

==== Long Service and Good Conduct Medal ====
The Long Service and Good Conduct medal is awarded to serving members of the Disciplined Services, who have accumulated 15 years of continuous service with good conduct, and are approved by the Commissioner of Police, also following recommendations by the Medal Awards Committee.

On the obverse of the Medal is the Cacique's Crown in the centre, and is similarly inscribed with Guyana's national motto, as are the Military Efficiency and Border Defence medals. On the reverse there is a key, a baton and an axe and the words "For Long Service and Good Conduct" inscribed.

=== Police, Prisons and Fire Services ===
==== Disciplined Services Star for Distinguished Service ====
The Disciplined Services Star for Distinguished Service (DSS) is the highest award presented to members of the Guyana Police Force, Prison Service, or Fire Brigade. It is awarded for distinguished service above and beyond the call of duty.

==== Disciplined Services Medal for Meritorious Service ====
The Disciplined Services Medal for Meritorious Service (DSM) is awarded to members of the Guyana Police Force, Prison Service, or Fire Brigade. It is awarded for dedicated and sustained service of a high order.

==== Disciplined Services Medal for Long Service and Good Conduct ====
The Disciplined Services Medal for Long Service and Good Conduct may be awarded to members of the Guyana Police Force, Prison Service, or Fire Brigade for the completion of fifteen years of continuous full-time service, and with no disciplinary issues for a period of twelve years.

== Order of precedence ==
- Order of Excellence of Guyana
- Order of Roraima of Guyana
- Cacique's Crown of Valour
- Cacique's Crown of Honour
- Golden Arrow of Courage
- Golden Arrow of Achievement
- Medal of Service
- President's Commendation for Brave Conduct
- Military Service Star
- Military Service Medal
- Efficiency Medal
- Disciplined Services Star for Distinguished Service
- Disciplined Services Medal for Meritorious Service
- Disciplined Services Medal for Long Service and Good Conduct

== Gallery ==
Order of Excellence

Order of Excellence (star)

Order of Excellence (badge)

Order of Roraima

Order of Roraima (badge)

Cacique's Crown of Valour

Cacique's Crown of Honour

Golden Arrow of Courage

Golden Arrow of Achievement

Medal of Service

Military Service Star

Military Service Medal

Military Efficiency Medal

Border Operations Medal

Disciplined Services Star for Distinguished Service - Fire Service

Disciplined Services Star for Distinguished Service - Police Force

Disciplined Services Star for Distinguished Service - Prison Service

Disciplined Services Medal for Meritorious Service - Fire Service

Disciplined Services Medal for Meritorious Service - Police Force

Disciplined Services Medal for Meritorious Service - Prison Service

Long Service and Good Conduct medal - Fire Service

Long Service and Good Conduct medal - Police Force

Long Service and Good Conduct medal - Prison Service
