= Shaik Baksh =

Guyanese politician

Shaik Bash

CEO of Guyana Water Incorporated
- Incumbent
- Assumed office August 2020

CEO of Guyana Water Incorporated
- In office 2012–2015

Guyana's Minister of Education
- In office 2006–2011

Guyana's Minister of Housing and Water
- In office 1998–2006

Personal details
- Occupation: Politician

Shaik Baksh is a Guyanese politician. He has served as Guyana's Minister of Education and as Minister of Housing and Water. He has worked as a lecturer at the University of Guyana and as an executive in the private sector.

Baksh was appointed CEO of Guyana Water Incorporated in 2012. In 2015, he was put on leave and subsequently resigned. He returned to the post in August 2020.

Minister Baksh holds a bachelor's degree in Management from the University of Guyana and an MSc in Management from the University of London.
