= Edward Luckhoo =

President of Guyana (1912–1998)

Sir Edward Luckhoo OR

3rd Governor-General of Guyana
- In office 10 November 1969 – 22 February 1970
- Monarch: Elizabeth II
- Prime Minister: Forbes Burnham
- Preceded by: Sir David Rose
- Succeeded by: President Arthur Chung as President of Guyana

Personal details
- Born: 24 May 1912 New Amsterdam, British Guiana
- Died: 3 March 1998 (aged 85) Ossett, West Yorkshire, England
- Resting place: Ossett, West Yorkshire, England
- Spouse(s): Lady Luckhoo, née Maureen Moxlow
- Education: St Catherine's College, Oxford; Middle Temple

Sir Edward Victor Luckhoo OR (24 May 1912 – 3 March 1998) was a Guyanese politician that was the last Governor-General of Guyana, and briefly the acting head of state of the Co‑operative Republic of Guyana on its formation in 1970.

== Family and education ==
He was born in New Amsterdam, Berbice, the son of British Raj immigrants Evelyn Maude Mungal-Singh and Edward Alfred Luckhoo, a solicitor of Indian extraction, and educated at Queen's College, Guyana and St Catherine's College, Oxford, where he was awarded a Bachelor of Arts degree in jurisprudence. He studied law at the Middle Temple, where he was called to the bar in 1931. Admitted to practice in 1936, he was made Queen's Counsel in 1965. His grandfather Moses Luckhoo came from India as labourer on sugar plantations.

He was the brother of lawyer and diplomat Sir Lionel Luckhoo, who was the British High Commissioner for Guyana and Barbados.

== Career ==
He was appointed a Justice of Appeal in 1966 and Chancellor of the Judiciary in October 1969.

As Chancellor of the Judiciary from 1969 to 1976, he briefly served as the acting head of state of the Co‑operative Republic of Guyana became a Republic on 23 February 1970. Therefore, Luckhoo was never the president of Guyana and was not officially mentioned.

== Honours ==
He was knighted on 1 January 1970 and received the Order of Roraima of Guyana in 1976.

- Knight Bachelor
- Order of Roraima of Guyana

== Private life ==
Edward Luckhoo was married to Maureen Moxlow of Batley, West Yorkshire, on 9 November 1981. In retirement, they returned to West Yorkshire, and lived in Ossett, where they were both active members of the Anglican Church, and catechists for Confirmation classes. Sir Edward died on 3 March 1998, aged 85, and is buried in Ossett. Lady Luckhoo still resides in the town.

Government offices
Preceded by David Rose	Governor-General of Guyana; 1969 – 1970	Succeeded by Himself as acting head of state of Guyana
