= 2026 United Nations Secretary-General selection =

- 30 July 2026 – present

Nominee	Rebeca Grynspan	Rafael Grossi
Country	Costa Rica	Argentina
Votes to encourage	10 / 15	8 / 15
P5 votes to discourage	2 / 5	3 / 5
Nominee	Lana Nusseibeh	Carolyn Rodrigues
Country	United Arab Emirates	Guyana
Votes to encourage	7 / 15	6 / 15
P5 votes to discourage	3 / 5	2 / 5
Incumbent Secretary-General
António Guterres

A United Nations Secretary-General selection is currently being held to choose the next secretary-general of the United Nations. The current secretary-general, António Guterres of Portugal, will complete his second term on 31 December 2026.

== Campaign ==
The selection process is governed by Article 97 of the Charter of the United Nations and by United Nations General Assembly resolutions, including resolution 79/327 of 5 September 2025. The process formally began on 25 November 2025 with a letter from the President of the General Assembly, Annalena Baerbock, and the President of the Security Council, Michael Imran Kanu, inviting Member States to nominate candidates. Nominations are announced jointly by the General Assembly and the Security Council.

Interactive dialogues between the nominated candidates and Member States were held in April and June 2026 and were broadcast live on UN Web TV. A town hall meeting with six of the official candidates, hosted by Bloomberg, took place on 23 July and was also broadcast online. The fifteen members of the Security Council began considering the candidates in July, and are expected to submit a recommendation to the General Assembly later in the year. They held the first of several closed-door, anonymous "straw poll" votes on their preferences on 30 July, followed by further anonymous polls on 21 August, 18 and 29 September, and 7 October. The first colour-coded straw poll was held on 16 October, revealing potential vetoes by the five permanent members of the Council, and was followed by colourless polls on 30 October and 5 November, as well as a colour-coded poll on 20 November.

Under an unwritten customary rule whereby the office of Secretary-General rotates among the organization's regional groups, a candidate from the Latin American and Caribbean Group (GRULAC) is strongly favoured.

== Candidates ==
=== Registered candidates ===
Ten candidates have been formally nominated by Member States, three of whom subsequently withdrew their candidacies.

Portrait	Name	Nominator	Nominated	Regional Group	Prior experience	Citations
	Ivonne Baki (Ecuador)	Tonga	17 August 2026	Latin American and Caribbean Group	Ecuadorian Ambassador to the United States (1998–2002; 2020–2024); Ecuadorian Ambassador to Qatar (2017–2020); Minister of Foreign Trade of Ecuador (2003–2005); Ecuadorian Ambassador to France (2024)	
	María Fernanda Espinosa (Ecuador)	Antigua and Barbuda	12 May 2026	Latin American and Caribbean Group	President of the 73rd UN General Assembly; Minister of Foreign Affairs of Ecuador (2017–2018); Minister of National Defence of Ecuador (2012–2014)	
	Rafael Grossi (Argentina)	Argentina	22 December 2025	Latin American and Caribbean Group	Argentine Ambassador to Austria (2013–2019); Director General of the International Atomic Energy Agency (2019–present)	
	Rebeca Grynspan (Costa Rica)	Costa Rica	3 March 2026	Latin American and Caribbean Group	Second Vice President of Costa Rica (1994–1998); Secretary-General of the Ibero-American General Secretariat (2014–2021); Secretary-General of UNCTAD (2021–present)	
	Lana Nusseibeh (United Arab Emirates)	United Arab Emirates	21 October 2026	Asia-Pacific Group	Permanent Representative of the United Arab Emirates to the United Nations (2013–2024); Assistant Minister for Political Affairs and Envoy of the Minister of Foreign Affairs of the United Arab Emirates (2024–present)	
	Olara Otunnu (Uganda)	Uganda	25 July 2026	African Group	Permanent Representative of Uganda to the United Nations (1980–1985); Minister of Foreign Affairs of Uganda (1985–1986); President of the International Peace Academy (1990–1998); Under-Secretary-General and Special Representative for Children in Armed Conflict (1997–2005)	
Rodrigues Birkett in 2011	Carolyn Rodrigues (Guyana)	Guyana	15 June 2026	Latin American and Caribbean Group	Minister of Amerindian Affairs of Guyana (2001–2008); Minister of Foreign Affairs of Guyana (2008–2015); Director at the UN Food and Agriculture Organization (2017–2020); Permanent Representative of Guyana to the United Nations (2020–present)	
	Feridun Sinirlioğlu (Turkey)	Turkey	30 October 2026	Western European and Others Group	Minister of Foreign Affairs of Turkey (2015); Permanent Representative of Turkey to the United Nations (2016–2023); Secretary General of the Organization for Security and Co-operation in Europe (since 2024)	

==== Withdrawn ====
Portrait	Name	Nominator	Nominated	Withdrew	Regional Group	Prior experience	Citations
	Michelle Bachelet (Chile)	Chile (withdrawn) (Note: Michelle Bachelet was jointly nominated in February 2026 by the governments of Brazil, Mexico and her home country, Chile, during the presidency of Gabriel Boric. However, on 24 March 2026, new Chilean president José Antonio Kast announced that his government would withdraw its support for Bachelet's candidacy.); Brazil; Mexico	2 February 2026	19 September 2026	Latin American and Caribbean Group	President of Chile (2006–2010, 2014–2018); United Nations High Commissioner for Human Rights (2018–2022); Executive director of UN Women (2010–2013)	
Headshot of Virginia Gamba	Virginia Gamba (Argentina)	Maldives	11 March 2026	25 March 2026	Latin American and Caribbean Group	Special Advisor to the Secretary-General on Prevention of Genocide and Hate Speech (acting) (2024–2025); Special Representative of the Secretary-General for Children and Armed Conflict (2017–2025); Director of the Office of Disarmament Affairs (2012–2015)	
	Macky Sall (Senegal)	Burundi	2 March 2026	17 October 2026	African Group	President of Senegal (2012–2024); Chairperson of the African Union (2022–2023); Prime Minister of Senegal (2004–2007); Special Envoy for the Paris Pact for People and the Planet (4P) (2024)	

=== Expressed interest ===
Before the formal start of the process and during the initial months, several individuals expressed an interest in the role but no formal candidacies have been received.

- David Choquehuanca, Vice President of Bolivia (2020–2025). In May 2025, before nominations formally opened, the Bolivian mission distributed a note to the UN's other permanent missions announcing Choquehuanca's candidacy; the nomination was described as "premature".
- Bruno Donat, a dual citizen of Mauritius and the U.S., head of the Geneva Office of the United Nations Mine Action Service (2019–2025). Donat announced he was standing in June 2025 in what was described as a "protest" candidacy by a UN insider.

=== Speculated ===
Press speculation about possible candidates, mostly before the formal process commenced, included such names as Jacinda Ardern, Alicia Bárcena, Kristalina Georgieva, Vuk Jeremić, Amina J. Mohammed, Mia Mottley, Kevin Rudd, Juan Manuel Santos and Achim Steiner. Santos and Mohammed both ruled themselves out, saying they preferred a female candidate, Mohammed added that the next Secretary-General should have come from Latin America or the Caribbean.

On 25 October 2026, citing sources from officials in the United States, China and Russia, the editorial board at The Wall Street Journal reported that the Trump administration had advocated Viktor Orbán as a joint candidate for the three countries in the selection, with China and Russia reportedly being supportive. It reported that an announcement was waiting for the 2026 US midterm elections and that Orbán was receptive to the idea, though he had reservations and wanted confidence he could win. However, Russian deputy foreign minister Alexander Alimov, reacting to the news, stated that although Orbán could technically still be nominated for the position, none of the aforementioned countries will nominate him. On 29 October, Jean-Noël Barrot, the Minister for Europe and Foreign Affairs of France also ruled out the candidacy support of Orbán, as for he believes that the position cannot be a “consolation prize” for a politician defeated in an election, and that the next Secretary-General must strengthen the authority of the UN. Orbán's potential nomination was also criticised by Polish prime minister Donald Tusk, who called the suggestion "ridiculous", while Ukranian foreign minister Andrii Sybiha remarked ironically that the former Hungarian prime minister would put his “masterful vetoing and blackmailing skills” to good use in this position as well.

== Endorsements ==
Michelle Bachelet (withdrawn)

Nations

- ~~Chile~~ (withdrawn)
- Brazil (nominator)
- Mexico (nominator)
- Colombia
Rafael Grossi

Nations

- Argentina (nominator)
- Italy
- Panama
- Paraguay

== Security Council straw polls ==
The Security Council is holding a series of straw polls by secret ballot, in which its members (Note: The Security Council comprises China, France, Russia, the United Kingdom and the United States (the five permanent members), together with ten non-permanent members on rotation: currently, Bahrain, Colombia, DR Congo, Denmark, Greece, Latvia, Liberia, Pakistan, Panama and Somalia.) are asked to indicate whether they "encourage", "discourage" or have "no opinion" regarding the candidates. During the first five rounds of the polls, all ballots were identical; beginning with the sixth round, ballots from the five permanent members were marked red to identify potential vetoes.

The first four rounds of voting showed Rebeca Grynspan of Costa Rica and Carolyn Rodrigues-Birkett of Guyana as the front-runners. However, unlike the previous two selection processes, no candidate gathered more than 10 encourage votes and no clear single front-runner emerged. Sources claimed that the permanent members of the Security Council were not enthusiastic about the field of candidates and were holding out for other candidates to enter. Council diplomats stated that some P5 members wanted to move to colour-coded ballots earlier in October, but this was opposed by the non-permanent members and the United Kingdom.

From the second ballot (on 21 August) to the fifth ballot (on 7 October), the number of "no opinion" votes steadily decreased. Support for Rodrigues-Birkett decreased markedly on the fifth ballot. Former American diplomats speculated that her views on Israel and close relationship with China made her likely to incur an American veto, though no vetoes were recorded in her case.

The sixth ballot, held on 16 October, was colour-coded and revealed an unprecedented number of red "no" votes, with all candidates receiving at least two negative votes from the P5. In previous selections, "veto duels" have occurred where two rival permanent members vetoed each others' preferred candidate; however, there has never been an instance where every candidate has received two or more red "no" votes.

The seventh ballot was originally scheduled for 23 October, but was postponed to 30 October after Nusseibeh joined the race late. Since it involved a new entrant, the Council reverted to unmarked ballots and hence the poll did not reveal any prospective vetoes on the candidacies.

The eighth ballot was held on 5 November, and was the first to feature Feridun Sinirlioğlu, whom Türkiye nominated on 1 November. It again featured unmarked ballots.

The ninth ballot was held on 20 November. The Council reverted to marked ballots, and the results were largely unchanged relative to the last marked vote on 16 October. In particular, each candidate again received at least two discouraging votes from permanent members.

2026 United Nations Secretary-General selection straw poll results
Candidate	30 July			21 August			18 September			29 September			7 October			16 October			30 October			5 November			20 November		
Candidate	E	D	N	E	D	N	E	D	N	E	D	N	E	D	N	E	D	N	E	D	N	E	D	N	E	D	N
Michelle Bachelet	6	5	4	2	6	7	1	11	3	Withdrawn																	
Ivonne Baki	Not yet nominated			0	8	7	0	10	5	1	11	3	0	14	1	1 (0P)	14 (5P)	0 (0P)	1	14	0	1	14	0	1 (0P)	13 (4P)	1 (1P)
María Fernanda Espinosa	5	2	8	4	3	8	3	6	6	3	10	2	3	9	3	3 (1P)	9 (3P)	3 (1P)	2	10	3	3	10	2	2 (1P)	12 (3P)	1 (1P)
Rafael Grossi	7	2	6	7	6	2	5	8	2	8	7	0	6	7	2	8 (2P)	6 (2P)	1 (1P)	9	4	2	9	4	2	8 (2P)	6 (3P)	1 (0P)
Rebeca Grynspan	10	1	4	7	4	4	9	5	1	10	3	2	9	6	0	9 (3P)	5 (2P)	1 (0P)	11	4	0	12	3	0	10 (3P)	4 (2P)	1 (0P)
Lana Nusseibeh	Not yet nominated																		7	6	2	7	6	2	7 (2P)	6 (3P)	2 (0P)
Olara Otunnu	2	5	8	5	5	5	5	7	3	5	8	2	3	12	0	4 (1P)	10 (3P)	1 (1P)	4	11	0	4	9	2	3 (0P)	12 (5P)	0 (0P)
Carolyn Rodrigues	9	2	4	8	3	4	8	6	1	8	6	1	5	9	1	8 (3P)	6 (2P)	1 (0P)	8	6	1	8	5	2	6 (3P)	6 (2P)	3 (0P)
Macky Sall	6	7	2	6	7	2	5	9	1	5	9	1	5	10	0	5 (2P)	10 (3P)	0 (0P)	Withdrawn								
Feridun Sinirlioğlu	Not yet nominated																					3	8	4	5 (1P)	10 (4P)	0 (0P)

Candidate received at least one "encouraged" from a veto-wielding P5 member
Candidate received at least one "discouraged" from a veto-wielding P5 member
