= Foreign secretary =

Foreign secretary may refer to:

- Foreign Secretary (United Kingdom), the cabinet minister who heads the Foreign, Commonwealth and Development Office
- Foreign Secretary (Bangladesh), the most senior diplomat and non-political official in the Ministry of Foreign Affairs
- Foreign Secretary (Guyana), a senior official within the Ministry of Foreign Affairs and International Cooperation
- Foreign Secretary (India), the top diplomat of India and administrative head of the Ministry of External Affairs
- Foreign Secretary (Pakistan), the most senior civil servant in the Ministry of Foreign Affairs
- Foreign Secretary (Sri Lanka), the Permanent Secretary in the Ministry of Foreign Affairs
- Secretary of Foreign Affairs (Federated States of Micronesia), the cabinet member who heads of the Department of Foreign Affairs
- Secretary of Foreign Affairs (Honduras), the cabinet minister in charge of implementing foreign policy, currently Eduardo Enrique Reina
- Secretary of Foreign Affairs (Mexico), the cabinet minister in charge of implementing foreign policy
- Secretary of Foreign Affairs (Philippines), the cabinet minister in charge of implementing foreign policy
- Secretary of State for Foreign and Political Affairs (San Marino), the minister of the Congress of State in charge of implementing foreign policy

== See also ==
- Ministry of foreign affairs, a government department of a country
- Secretary of State (disambiguation)
