= List of diplomatic missions in Guyana =

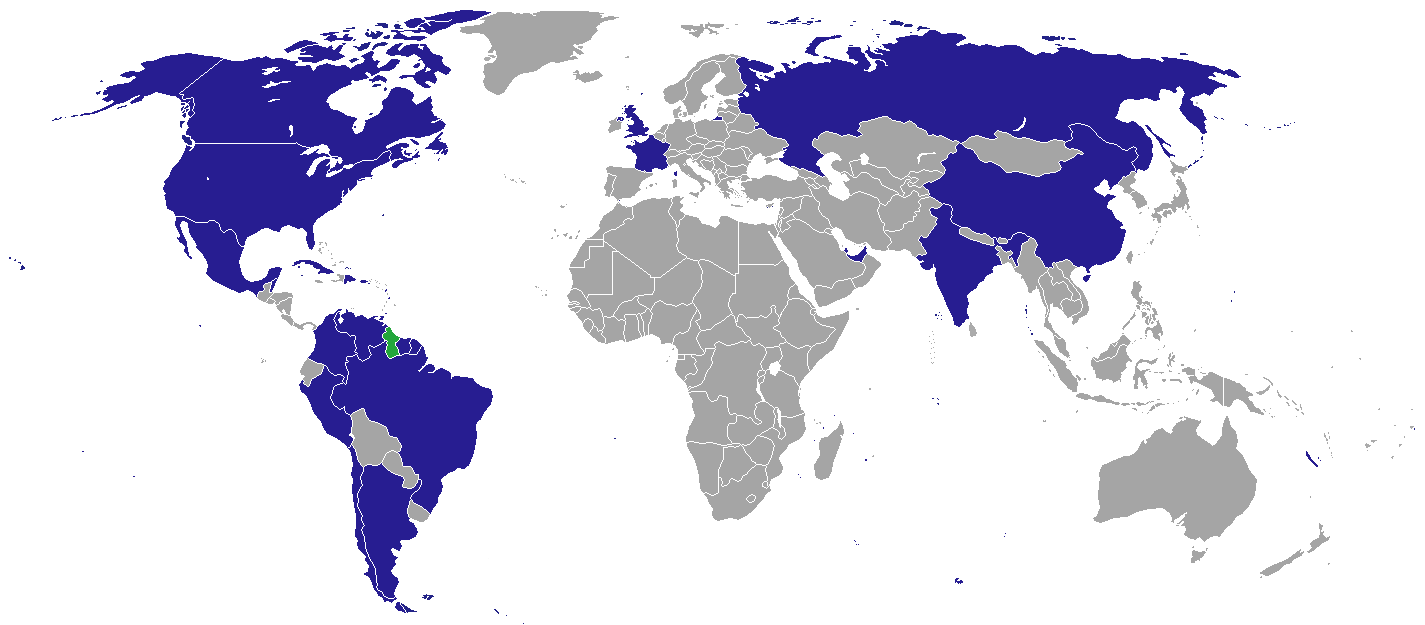
Countries with diplomatic missions in Guyana

There are currently 23 embassies/high commissions in Georgetown, the capital city of Guyana. Several other countries have ambassadors accredited to Guyana on a non-resident basis.

In addition, Georgetown is the seat of the Caribbean Community, and as such, resident embassies and high commissions are also accredited to that organization.

This listing excludes honorary consulates.

== Diplomatic missions in Georgetown ==
=== Embassies/High Commissions ===
Entries marked with an asterisk (*) are member-states of the Commonwealth of Nations. As such, their diplomatic missions are formally termed as high commissions.

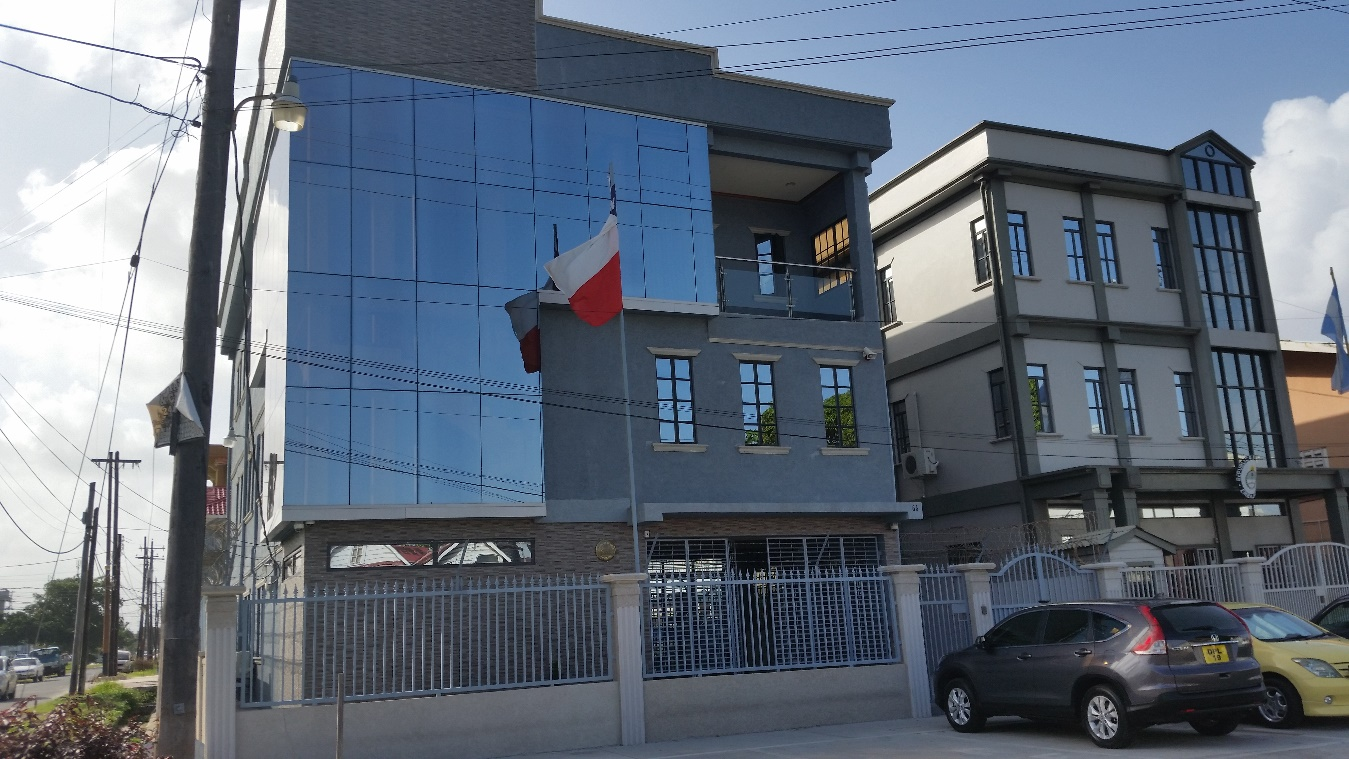
Embassies of Argentina and Chile

1. Argentina
2. Belize*
3. Brazil
4. Canada*
5. Chile
6. China
7. Colombia
8. Cuba
9. Dominican Republic
10. France
11. India*
12. Mexico
13. Panama
14. Peru
15. Qatar
16. Russia
17. Suriname
18. Sovereign Military Order of Malta
19. Trinidad and Tobago*
20. United Arab Emirates
21. United Kingdom*
22. United States
23. Venezuela

=== Other delegations or representative offices ===
1. European Union (Delegation)
2. Organization of American States (Representative office)
3. United Nations (Resident coordinator's office)

== Consular missions ==
=== Lethem ===
- Brazil (Vice-Consulate)

== Non-resident embassies ==
=== Resident in Brasília, Brazil ===
- Azerbaijan
- Bolivia
- Botswana
- Bulgaria
- Cyprus
- Czechia
- Denmark
- Egypt
- Georgia
- Guinea
- Hungary
- Ireland
- Ivory Coast
- Jordan
- Kuwait
- Morocco
- Malaysia
- Norway
- Pakistan
- Philippines
- Romania
- Saudi Arabia
- Serbia
- Slovakia
- Syria
- Thailand
- Tanzania
- Ukraine
- Vietnam
- Zambia

=== Resident in Caracas, Venezuela ===
- Algeria
- Belgium
- Finland
- Greece
- Iran
- Libya
- Nicaragua
- Palestine
- Paraguay
- Poland
- Portugal
- South Korea
- Switzerland

=== Resident in Havana, Cuba ===
- Kenya
- Laos
- North Korea
- Zimbabwe

=== Resident in New York City, United States ===
Accredited missions extended to the country via permanent missions at the United Nations

- Bangladesh
- Eswatini
- Iceland
- Maldives
- Namibia
- Nauru
- Tuvalu

=== Resident in Port-of-Spain, Trinidad and Tobago ===
- Australia
- El Salvador
- Germany
- Ghana
- Guatemala
- Holy See
- Jamaica
- Japan
- Nigeria
- South Africa
- Spain
- Turkey

=== Resident elsewhere ===
- Austria (Bogotá)
- Bahamas (Nassau)
- Barbados (Saint Michael, Barbados)
- Central African Republic (Washington, D.C.)
- Haiti (Kingston, Jamaica)
- Indonesia (Paramaribo)
- Israel (Panama City)
- Italy (Panama City)
- Mauritius (Washington, D.C.)
- Netherlands (Paramaribo)
- New Zealand (Bridgetown)
- Sierra Leone (Washington, D.C.)
- Singapore (Tanglin, Singapore)
- St. Lucia (Castries)
- Sweden (Stockholm)
- Uruguay (Bogotá)

== Former embassies ==
- North Korea (Note: Resident in Havana, Cuba)
- Yugoslavia (Note: Serbian resident in Brasília, Brazil)

== See also ==
- Foreign relations of Guyana
- List of diplomatic missions of Guyana
- Visa policy of Guyana
