= Rashleigh Jackson =

Guyanese politician (1929–2022)

Minister of Foreign Affairs
- In office 1978–1990

Permanent Representative of Guyana to the United Nations
- In office 1973–1978

Personal details
- Born: 12 January 1929
- Died: 1 September 2022 (aged 93)

Rashleigh Jackson (12 January 1929 – 1 September 2022) was a Guyanese politician who served as Minister of Foreign Affairs. He died on 1 September 2022, at the age of 93.
