= Guyana–Spain relations =

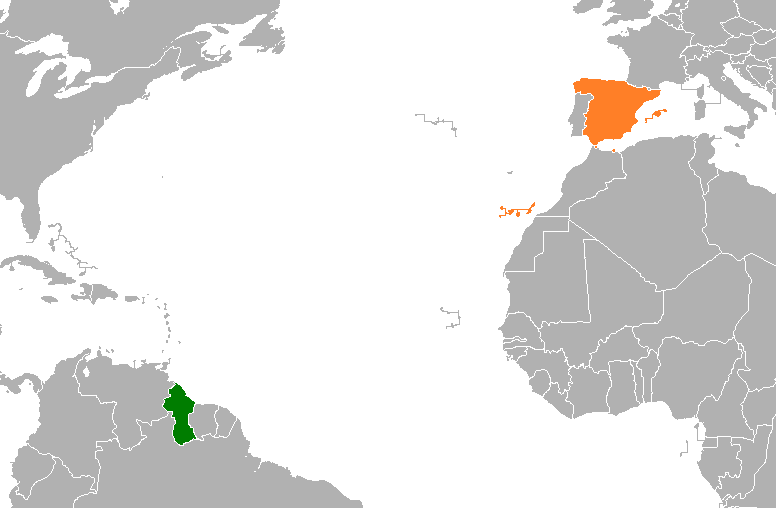

- Guyana: Spain

Guyana and Spain maintain bilateral relations. The embassy of Guyana in Belgium is accredited for Spain. The Spanish embassy in Port of Spain, Trinidad and Tobago, is accredited for Guyana, and Spain has an honorary consulate in Georgetown.

== Historical relations ==
The mouths of Esequibo and Orinoco, and the entire coast of Guyana was known and explored by Alonso de Ojeda and Pedro Alonso Niño, who they arrived at Demerara in 1499, as referred to by Juan de la Cosa, who also mapped the area. The point at which they touched down was called Cabo de San Alonso.

Between 1530 and 1531, Diego de Ordás conquers and colonizes the entire Guiana coast, and in 1594 Spain officially takes possession of the Province of Guyana, which It included the Guiana Esequiba currently claimed by Venezuela. It is believed that until the Dutch invasion of 1615, more than 2000 Spanish settlers occupied this territory. (The more moderate estimates reduce it to a maximum of one hundred or a little more Hispanic settlers and the rest up to 2,000 would be Indians or civilized mestizos from the current Venezuela).

== Diplomatic relations ==
The Spanish Embassy in Port of Spain has been accredited before Guyana since 2008, having confirmed the official appointment of an Honorary Consul of Spain in the country at the beginning of 2012. Ambassador José María Fernández López de Turiso presented his Credentials to the President of the Republic of Guyana in April 2014.

== High level visits ==
In May 2014, the Minister of Foreign Affairs and Cooperation, José Manuel García Margallo, visited Georgetown on the occasion of the meeting of the COFCOR (meeting of Ministers of Foreign Affairs) of CARICOM.

In June 2014, the Minister of Tourism, Industry and Commerce of Guyana, Mohamed Irfaan Ali, traveled to Madrid to participate in a seminar on tourism organized by the EOI (School of Industrial Organization) together with the Ministry of Affairs Foreign and Cooperation, the Ministry of Industry, Energy and Tourism and the Tourism Institute of Spain.

Before, and on the occasion of the VI EU-LAC Summit, which took place from 17 to 19 May 2010, the then Minister of Foreign Affairs, Carolyn Rodrigues-Birkett, traveled to Spain. It was the second highlight visit by the Guyanese authorities to Spain after the then Minister of Tourism, Industry and Commerce, Manniram Prashad, visited Spain to attend the IV EU / LAC Summit in July 2008.
