= Hugh Todd =

Guyanese politician

- Todd in June 2022

Minister of Foreign Affairs and International Cooperation
- Incumbent
- Assumed office 5 August 2020
- President: Irfaan Ali
- Preceded by: Karen Cummings

Personal details
- Born: Hugh Hilton Todd
- Party: People's Progressive Party
- Education: University of the West Indies (M.S.)
- Occupation: Politician, lecturer

Hugh Hilton Todd is a Guyanese politician serving as Minister of Foreign Affairs and International Cooperation since 2020.

== Early life and service ==
Hugh Todd joined the Guyana Defence Force in 1993. In 1995, he received his training at the Britannia Royal Naval College and was promoted to the rank of sub-lieutenant. He served in the Guyana Defence Force Coast Guard.

== Career ==
In 2001, Todd was co-founder of Linden Television Cable Network for which he served as director until 2009. In 2011, he graduated from the University of the West Indies with a Master of Science degree in Global Studies. In 2012, Todd became a lecturer at the University of Guyana, and in 2017 was appointed assistant dean.

On 5 August 2020, Todd was appointed Minister of Foreign Affairs and International Cooperation in the cabinet of Irfaan Ali. Former minister Carl Barrington Greenidge, who had handled the Guyana–Venezuela territorial dispute at the International Court of Justice, was retained on the team while the case remained ongoing.

Todd was diagnosed COVID-19 positive on 12 August 2020 which resulted in the temporary quarantine and testing of all cabinet members.

On 17 August 2020, he appointed Robert Persaud as Foreign Secretary.
