= Amara Essy =

Ivorian diplomat and politician (1944–2025)

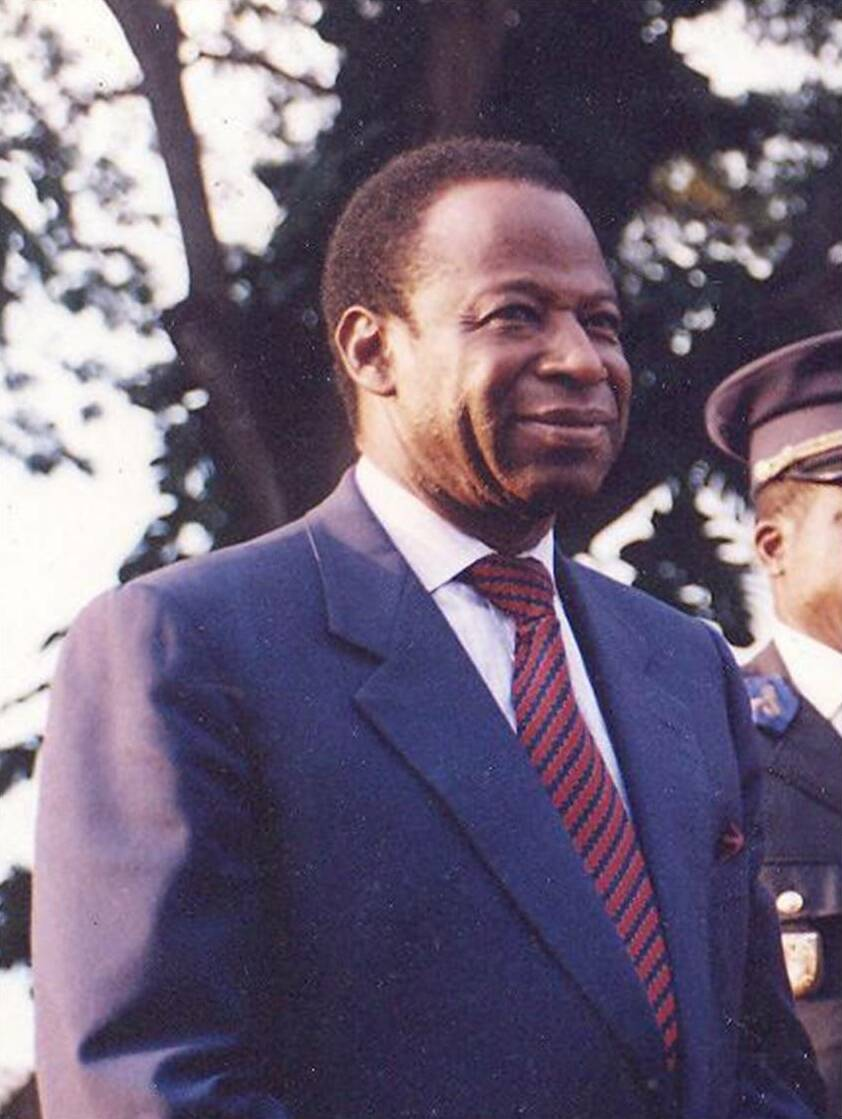

Interim Chairman of the Commission of the African Union
- In office 9 July 2002 – 16 September 2003
- Preceded by: Position established; Himself (as Secretary-general of the OAS)
- Succeeded by: Alpha Oumar Konaré

7th Secretary-general of the Organization of African Unity
- In office 17 September 2001 – 9 July 2002
- Preceded by: Salim Ahmed Salim
- Succeeded by: Position abolished; Himself (as interim Chairman of the African Union)

President of the United Nations General Assembly
- In office 20 September 1994 – September 1995
- Preceded by: Samuel Insanally
- Succeeded by: Diogo de Freitas do Amaral

Personal details
- Born: 20 December 1944 Bouaké, Ivory Coast, French West Africa
- Died: 8 April 2025 (aged 80) Abidjan, Ivory Coast
- Occupation: Lawyer, diplomat and politician

Amara Essy (20 December 1944 – 8 April 2025) was an Ivorian diplomat and politician. Close to Félix Houphouët-Boigny, he was Minister of Foreign Affairs of Côte d'Ivoire between 1990 and 2000, and in this capacity he served as President of the 49th Session of the United Nations General Assembly between September 1994 and September 1995. Secretary-General of the Organization of African Unity (OAU) in 2001, he became interim chairman of the African Union Commission when it was created in July 2002.

== Early life and education ==
Essy was born in Bouaké, Ivory Coast on 20 December 1944. He received a bachelor's degree in public law and a higher education diploma in public law as well. He also held a diploma from the Carnegie Endowment for International Peace in Switzerland.

== Career ==
Essy began his professional career in 1970 as head of economic relations in the office of technical and economic cooperation. A year later, he was named first counselor of the Ivorian embassy in Brazil. He also served as counselor of the permanent mission of Côte d'Ivoire to the United Nations in New York from 1973 to 1975. He later served as permanent representative of Côte d'Ivoire to the European office of the UN in Geneva and to UNIDO in Vienna, Austria from October 1975 to September 1978. He also served as president of the Group of 77 in Geneva from 1977 to 1978 and was later named ambassador extraordinary and plenipotentiary to Switzerland.

He was the Permanent Representative of Côte d'Ivoire to the United Nations from 1981 to 1990, and in January 1990 he was President of the United Nations Security Council. Simultaneously, he served as Ivorian ambassador to Argentina (1981–1983) and Cuba (1988–1990), respectively. In 1990 he became Minister of Foreign Affairs, and while in that position he served as President of the 49th Session of the United Nations General Assembly from 1994 to 1995. In February 1996, he was elected the mayor of Kouassi-Datékro, serving until 2000. In 1998 he gained the rank of Minister of State held it until 2000, while remaining Foreign Minister. Along with other ministers, he was detained following the military coup of 24 December 1999, but he was released on 28 December. He was replaced in the transitional government named on 4 January 2000.

On 9 July 2001 he was elected secretary-general of the Organisation of African Unity (OAU) in Lusaka, Zambia, with the task of leading the OAU's transformation into the African Union over the course of one year. He took office as secretary-general in Addis Ababa, Ethiopia on 17 September 2001. Essy served in that position until 9 July 2002, when the OAU became the African Union and he was appointed interim Chairman of the Commission of the African Union.

On 7 July 2003, Laurent Gbagbo decided to withdraw Essy Camara's candidacy for the post of President of the African Union (AU) Commission. Essy was initially a candidate for the post of chairman of the commission at the AU's July 2003 summit in Maputo, Mozambique, but he withdrew prior to the vote, leaving Alpha Oumar Konaré, the former president of Mali, as the only candidate. Essy remained interim chairman of the commission until he was succeeded by Konaré on 16 September 2003.

In 2009, Essy was appointed the African Union's envoy to Madagascar, to assess that country’s political crisis, and in 2012 he chaired the UN High Level Panel for the Algerian parliamentary elections.

On 7 December 2014, he declared himself a candidate for the 2015 Ivorian presidential election, in dissent from the official position of the PDCI and other party candidates. He finally gave up his candidacy, shortly before the election on 7 October 2015.

Essy was a member of the Global Leadership Foundation (chaired by F. W. de Klerk) that works to support democratic leadership, prevent and resolve conflict through mediation, and promote good governance in the form of democratic institutions, open markets, human rights, and the rule of law. He also held the title of Honorary Professor of the New England Centre for International Studies at the University of Bridgeport in Connecticut.

== Death ==
Essy died at his home in Abidjan, on 8 April 2025, at the age of 80. (Note: Sources mislabel his age as "82".) News Central concluded that Essy will be "remembered as a veteran statesman who helped shape Ivory Coast’s diplomatic engagement with the world and left a lasting legacy in African diplomacy."

== Awards ==
Essy had been awarded numerous decorations as part of his diplomatic service, including the National Order of the Ivory Coast, the Grand Cross of the Lion of Senegal, the Grand Cross of Rio Branco of Brazil and the National Order of San Carlos of Colombia.

National Order of the Ivory Coast

== Notes ==
Positions in intergovernmental organisations
Preceded by Samuel Insanally	President of the United Nations General Assembly; 1994–1995	Succeeded by Diogo Freitas do Amaral
New office	Chairperson of the African Union Commission; 2002–2003	Succeeded by Alpha Oumar Konaré
