= Guyanese passport =

Passport issued to citizens of Guyana

- Guyanese passport front cover
- Type: Passport
- Issued by: Guyana
- Purpose: Identification
- Eligibility: Guyanese citizenship
- Expiration: 5 or 10 years after date of issue.
- Cost: G$ 6000 (5 years validity), G$ 12000 (10 years validity)

The Guyanese passport is issued to citizens of Guyana for international travel. As of July 2007, Guyana has issued the common Caribbean passport, featuring the logo of the Caribbean Community on the cover.

The passport contains 32 pages and is issued for a validity period of 5 years. New machine readable passports are issued by the Passport Office within 5–7 days in Guyana (weekend not included). The old green cover passports remain valid until the end of their stated period of validity.

All passports are processed and issued by the Central Immigration and Passport Office (an arm of the Guyana Police Force) in Georgetown, Guyana. The Passport Office falls under the purview of the Ministry of Home Affairs.

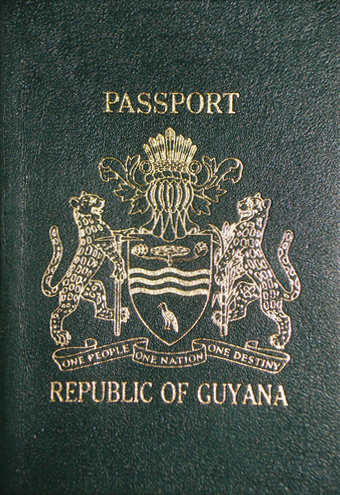
Guyana Pre-CARICOM Passport

== Languages ==
The previous non-Machine-readable passport (MRP) used English (the official language of Guyana) and French as the two languages in the Passport. The current CARICOM Guyana MRP has dropped French and instead uses English and Spanish as the two languages in the Passport. However, this is only done on the biodata page. All other pages use only English.

== Period of Validity ==
The previous non-Machine-readable passport (MRP) was valid for 5 years, and could be renewed for 5 years after the first expiry date, and another 5 years after the expiry of the renewal (for a total of 15 years total usage). In all cases of renewal, a recent photograph of the bearer is affixed to the passport.

The machine readable Guyana Passport is valid for 5 years and may not be renewed. Instead a new passport must be obtained at the end of that 5-year period, or if there is no more space for visas, or travel.

The Guyana e-passports issued from 2025 have two validity periods: 5 or 10 years, which the applicant may choose and pay for at the time of their application.

== Passport Message ==
The note contained in both the Guyanese pre-CARICOM Passport, and the Guyana CARICOM Passport reads:

"These are to request and require in the name of the President of the Republic of Guyana all those whom it may concern to allow the bearer to pass freely without let or hindrance, and to afford the bearer such assistance and protection as may be necessary."

== Design ==
The current CARICOM Guyana MRP has a striking and colorful design with images of local flora, fauna, architecture, and natural wonders adorning the Visa pages and the inside covers of the passport. The Coat of arms of Guyana is one of the design elements used throughout the passport. The design also includes various security features to protect the integrity of the passport.

== Visa requirements ==
As of 9 November 2022, Guyanese citizens have visa-free or visa on arrival access to 88 countries and territories, ranking the Guyanese passport 64th in terms of travel freedom according to the Henley visa restrictions index.

== Gallery ==
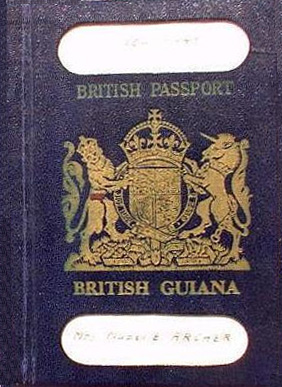
British Guiana Passport used when Guyana was a British colony

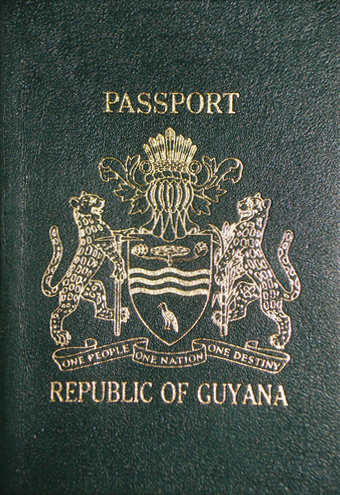
Guyana Passport (until 2007)

== See also ==
- Caribbean passport
- Visa requirements for Guyanese citizens
