= Clement Rohee =

Guyanese politician (born 1950)

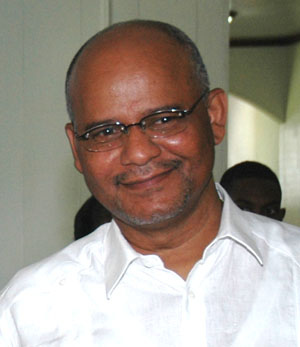
- Clement Rohee (2006)

Minister of Foreign Affairs and International Cooperation
- In office 1992–2001
- President: Cheddi Jagan; Janet Jagan; Bharrat Jagdeo
- Preceded by: Cheddi Jagan
- Succeeded by: Rudy Insanally

Personal details
- Born: Clement James Rohee; 16 March 1950 (age 76)
- Party: People's Progressive Party
- Occupation: Politician

Clement James Rohee (born 16 March 1950) is a Guyanese politician who has been General Secretary of the People's Progressive Party (PPP) since 2013. Under the PPP government, he served as Minister of Foreign Affairs from 1992 to 2001, Minister of Foreign Trade from 2001 to 2006, and Minister of Home Affairs from 2006 to 2015.

== Life and career ==
In his youth, Rohee joined the PPP's Progressive Youth Organization. Following the PPP victory in the 1992 election, he served as Minister of Foreign Affairs from 1992 to 2001. He was Chairman of the Group of 77 in 1999. At a ceremony marking Guyana's assumption of chairmanship in January 1999, Rohee said that the international monetary system was at "risk for devastating failure" and was "severely flawed", pointing to the Asian financial crisis and calling for reform of the system.

From 2001 to 2006, he was Minister of Foreign Trade and International Co-operation. During this time, he was also the Ministerial Spokesperson of CARICOM regarding negotiations at the World Trade Organization from 2002 to 2006, as well as the Lead Ministerial Spokesperson of CARICOM regarding sugar from 2004 to 2006. In September 2006, he became Minister of Home Affairs in a cabinet reshuffle after the PPP won a fourth term in the 2006 election.

Rohee is a member of the Central Committee and the Executive Committee of the PPP. He has also served as a member of the PPP's Education Committee, as Secretary of the Central Committee responsible for International Affairs, and as Executive Secretary and Convenor of the PPP's Race Relations Committee. He has also served on the editorial board of the PPP journal Thunder. At the party's 29th Congress, he received the 11th highest number of votes (507) in the election to the 35-member PPP Central Committee on August 2, 2008. He was then elected to the PPP Executive Committee and the Thunder editorial board on August 12, 2008.

In 2012, because of his oversight portfolio over Guyana's security sector, Clement Rohee was accused of being responsible for the deaths of three unarmed protesters in the Guyanese mining town of Linden during a protest against economic conditions in that town. He subsequently denied any responsibility for the killings at a special inquiry held in Guyana after the incident.

In July 2012, Guyana's opposition-dominated parliament passed a no confidence motion against Rohee, which urged him to resign over parliament's lack of confidence in him running the security sector. The PPP government refused to adhere to the opposition motion. The speaker of parliament later ruled that the opposition motion had no legal merit, and as such lifted the gagging motion against Rohee.

The PPP Central Committee elected Rohee as General Secretary of the PPP on 19 August 2013. Rohee succeeded President Donald Ramotar, who nominated Rohee for the post.
