= Visa policy of Guyana =

Policy on permits required to enter Guyana

Visitors to Guyana must obtain an e-Visa unless they are citizens from one of the visa-exempt countries.

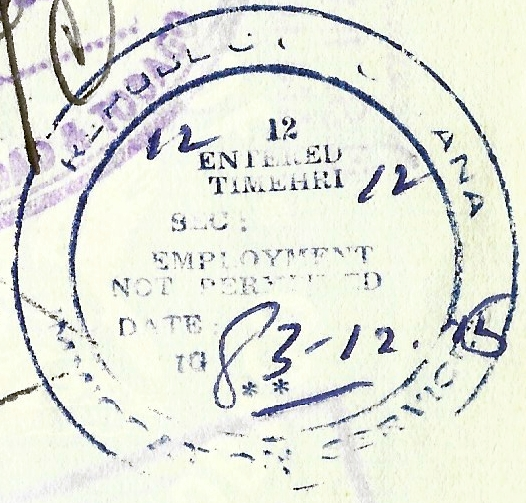
Old entry stamp of Guyana

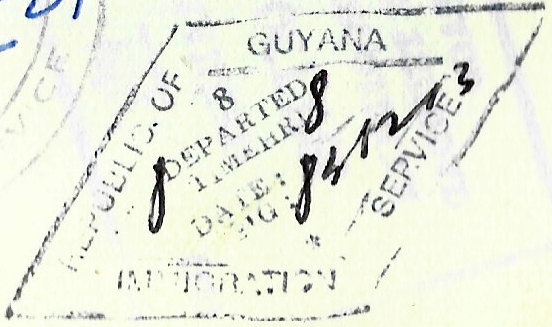
Old exit stamp of Guyana

All visitors must hold a passport valid for at least 6 months.

== Visa policy map ==
Visa policy of Guyana Guyana Visa not required (indefinite period) Visa not required (180 days) Visa not required (90 days) Visa not required (60 days) Visa not required (30 days) Visa not required (14 days) Visa not required (90 days) if holding a valid Canadian, Schengen or US visa, or a permanent residence card issued by the US; otherwise, eVisa eVisa

== Visa exemption ==
=== Ordinary passports ===
Citizens of the following countries and territories may enter Guyana without a visa for the following period:

Indefinite period

- British Virgin Islands

180 days

- Panama^{T}

6 months

- Antigua and Barbuda
- Barbados
- Belize
- Dominica
- Grenada
- Jamaica
- Saint Kitts and Nevis
- Saint Lucia
- Saint Vincent and the Grenadines
- Suriname
- Trinidad and Tobago

90 days

- Albania
- Argentina
- Austria
- Australia
- Bahamas
- Belgium
- Botswana
- Brazil^{ID}
- Canada
- Chile
- Cuba
- Denmark
- Ecuador
- Finland
- France (Note: Including all territories of Overseas France.)
- Germany
- Ghana
- Greece
- Hong Kong
- Ireland
- Italy
- Japan
- Luxembourg
- Montserrat
- Netherlands (Note: Including Aruba, Caribbean Netherlands, Curaçao and Sint Maarten.)
- New Zealand
- North Korea
- Norway
- Peru^{T}
- Portugal
- Qatar
- Russia
- Spain
- Sweden
- Switzerland
- United Arab Emirates
- United Kingdom (Note: For British citizens only.)
- United States
- Uruguay

90 days within any 180 days

- Colombia (Note: The stay may be extended for an additional 90 days.)

60 days

- Eswatini
- Malaysia

30 days

- Cayman Islands
- Costa Rica^{T}
- Dominican Republic
- Kuwait
- Maldives
- Singapore
- South Africa
- South Korea
- Turks and Caicos Islands

14 days

- Lesotho

_{ID - May enter Guyana through Lethem by land and travel as far as Annai using an ID card in lieu of a passport. A passport is required to travel elsewhere in Guyana.}
_{T - For tourist purposes only.}

Date of visa changes
- 1 August 2010: Russia
- 16 May 2013: Dominican Republic
- 25 February 2017: Chile
- 19 October 2017: Colombia

A visa is not required for nationals of any country with a document stating that they were born in Guyana, or for children under age 18 born to nationals of Guyana if holding a birth certificate or parents' passport.

==== Substitute visa ====
Citizens of the following countries may enter Guyana without a visa for up to 90 days if they hold a valid visa issued by any Schengen Area member state, Canada or the United States, or a permanent residence card (Green Card) issued by the United States:

- Guatemala
- Honduras
- Mexico

=== Non-ordinary passports ===
In addition to countries whose citizens are visa-exempt, holders of diplomatic or official / service passports of Bangladesh, Bolivia, Georgia, Haiti, Mexico, Peru and Venezuela; holders of diplomatic or official passports of Guatemala; holders of diplomatic, service or special passports of Egypt and Turkey; holders of diplomatic, service or public affairs passports of China; holders of diplomatic or service passports of Cape Verde, Cyprus, India and Israel and holders of diplomatic or special passports of Iran may enter Guyana without a visa.

== Visa on arrival ==
Citizens of any country traveling as tourists with an approval letter from the Ministry of Home Affairs of Guyana can also obtain a visa on arrival for a stay of up to 30 days. They can also apply to extend their stay.

Citizens of any country with a confirmation that a business, employment or student visa has been issued by the Ministry of Home Affairs of Guyana before departure can also obtain a visa on arrival.

== Electronic visa (e-Visa) ==
According to Timatic, all other visitors that are not visa exempt may obtain an e-Visa before departure. An e-Visa (Approval letter) can only be obtained after contacting the Department of Immigration and Citizenship by phone. Payment is done upon arrival.

== See also ==
- Visa requirements for Guyanese citizens
- List of diplomatic missions of Guyana
