= Bruno Donat =

Mauritian diplomat

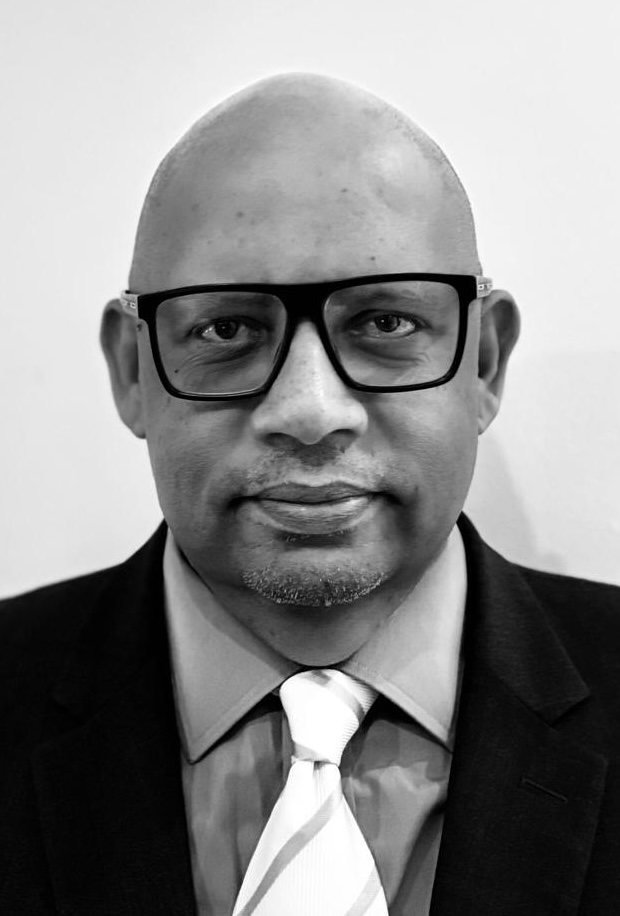

Chief, Geneva Office United Nations Mine Action Service
- In office 2019–2025
- Secretary-General: António Guterres

Personal details
- Education: Boston College

Bruno Donat is a Mauritian-American diplomat and international affairs professional who has worked primarily in the fields of demilitarisation, humanitarian disarmament, and post-conflict recovery. He has held senior positions within the United Nations, including assignments in the Democratic Republic of the Congo, the Great Lakes region of Central Africa, West Africa, and the Sahel.

From 2019 to 2025, Donat served as Head of the Geneva Office of the United Nations Mine Action Service (UNMAS), which operates under the Office of Rule of Law and Security Institutions (OROLSI) in the Department of Peace Operations (DPO). In this capacity, he also acted as Global Coordinator of the Mine Action Area of Responsibility (MA AoR) within the United Nations High Commissioner for Refugees (UNHCR)-led Global Protection Cluster. His responsibilities included leading global policy development, inter-agency coordination, and engagement with donors and stakeholders on issues related to explosive ordnance risk mitigation and humanitarian access.

Donat gained international media attention in March 2024 after staging a hunger strike outside the United Nations Headquarters in New York to protest the humanitarian crisis in Gaza and the UN’s perceived inaction. His protest, which called for increased protection for civilians and children, was covered by Reuters, The Guardian, and Mauritian news outlets. In interviews, Donat stated that his action was intended to highlight the UN’s moral responsibility in conflict zones.

In June 2025, Donat announced a protest candidacy for the position of United Nations Secretary-General, citing concerns about transparency and inclusivity in the appointment processes for senior UN officials. The campaign, widely supported by officials across the UN and diplomatic system, aimed to highlight issues related to representation and accountability within the UN system.

Donat holds dual Mauritian and American citizenship.
