= Carl Barrington Greenidge =

Guyanese politician (born 1949)

Carl Greenidge
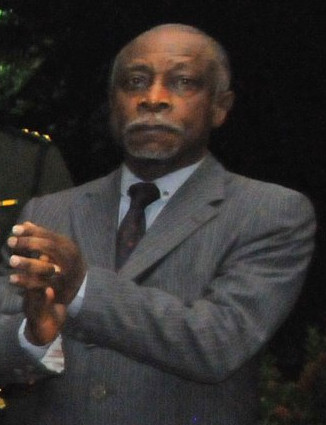
- Greenidge in 2018

Foreign Secretary
- In office May 2019 – August 2020
- President: David A. Granger

Vice President
- In office May 2015 – April 2019
- President: David A. Granger

Minister of Foreign Affairs
- In office May 2015 – April 2019
- President: David A. Granger
- Preceded by: Carolyn Rodrigues
- Succeeded by: Karen Cummings

Minister of Finance
- In office 1983–1992
- President: Forbes Burnham; Desmond Hoyte
- Preceded by: Hugh Desmond Hoyte
- Succeeded by: Asgar Ally

Personal details
- Born: Carl Barrington Greenidge; 3 March 1949 (age 77) New Amsterdam, British Guiana
- Party: People's National Congress
- Occupation: Politician

Carl Barrington Greenidge (born 3 March 1949) is a Guyanese politician from People's National Congress. From May 2015 to April 2019, he served as Minister of Foreign Affairs and one of the vice presidents in the cabinet of David A. Granger.

== Biography ==
Greenidge was born in New Amsterdam. He has a bachelor's degree in economics from the University of Exeter, an MA and an MPhil in Economics from the University of London. Greenridge served as Minister of Finance from 1983 to 1992 in the cabinet of Forbes Burnham.

In May 2015, Greenidge was appointed Minister of Foreign Affairs and one of the vice presidents in the cabinet of David A. Granger During his tenure, he was involved with the Guyana–Venezuela territorial dispute at the International Court of Justice. In 2019, Greenidge was forced to resign when the Caribbean Court of Justice ruled that people with dual citizenship were not eligible to be members of the National Assembly. Greenidge, who also held British citizenship at time, was replaced as minister by Karen Cummings and appointed to the newly created position of Foreign Secretary. Hugh Todd, the Minister of Foreign Affairs as of 2020, appointed Robert Persaud to the position of Foreign Secretary but retained Greenidge on the ministry's team regarding the Guyana-Venezuela border case.
