= Ivonne Baki =

Ecuadorian politician and diplomat

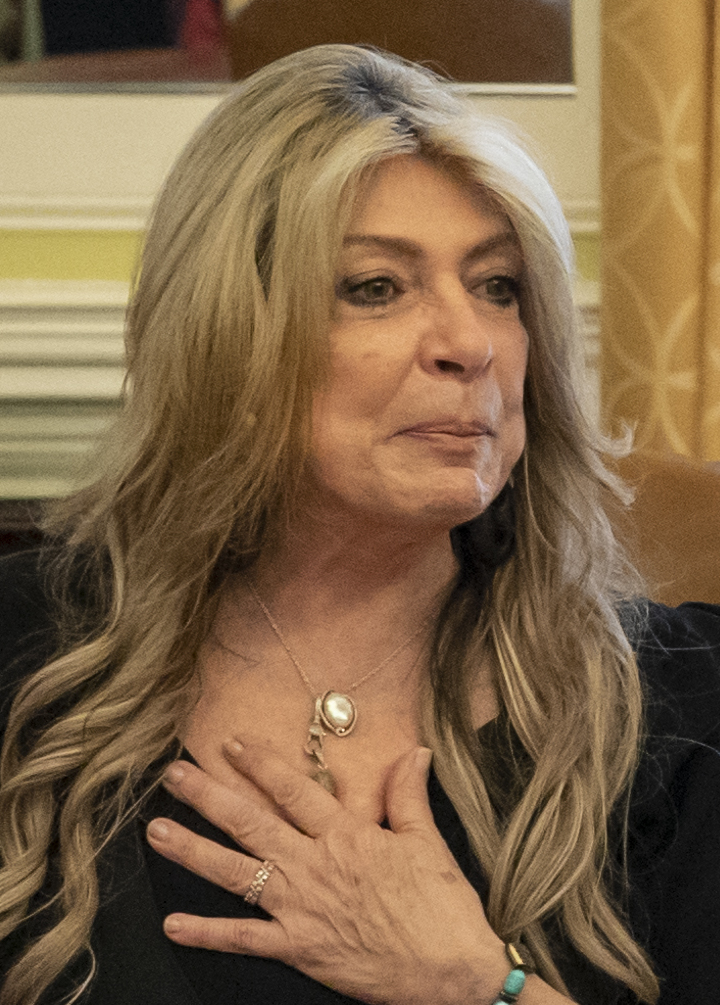
- Baki in 2023

Ecuadorian Ambassador to France
- In office 8 February 2024 – 6 November 2024
- President: Daniel Noboa

Ecuadorian Ambassador to the United States
- In office 3 February 2020 – 8 February 2024
- President: Lenin Moreno; Guillermo Lasso; Daniel Noboa
- Preceded by: Francisco Carrión
- In office 1998–2002
- President: Jamil Mahuad; Gustavo Noboa

President of the Andean Parliament
- In office 2007–2009
- Preceded by: Luis Fernando Duque
- Succeeded by: Fausto Lupera

Minister of Industries and Productivity
- In office 2003–2005
- President: Lucio Gutiérrez
- Preceded by: Richard Moss Ferreira
- Succeeded by: Oswaldo Molestina

Personal details
- Born: Ivonne Leila Juez Abuchacra; 23 February 1951 (age 75) Guayaquil, Ecuador
- Education: Paris-Sorbonne University; Harvard University
- Occupation: Diplomat, politician

Ivonne Leila Juez Abuchacra de Baki or Ivonne A-Baki (born 23 February 1951) is an Ecuadorian politician and diplomat. She is most known for her time as the Ecuadorian Minister of Industries and Productivity and as the President of the Andean Parliament. She is Ecuador's former Ambassador to France, Qatar and the United States. She was the first Ecuadorian female ambassador to the United States. She was the Ecuadorian Ambassador to France for most of 2024.

On 18 August 2026, she announced her candidacy to be Secretary-General of the United Nations on X and published a vision statement.

== Early life and education ==
Ivonne Baki was born on 23 February 1951 in Guayaquil to Fred Juez and Anan Abuchacra, both Lebanese immigrants to Ecuador. At 17, Ivonne married Lebanese millionaire Sami A-Baki, took his surname, and moved to his residence in Lebanon. The couple would be present in the country for much of the Lebanese Civil War. In 1982, Ivonne Baki moved to Paris and studied the arts at the Paris-Sorbonne University. Later, she would study Public administration at Harvard University.

== Career ==
Baki began her political career as Ecuador's consul to Beirut in 1981. From 1992 to 1998, she was an honorary consul in Boston, Massachusetts in the United States of America.

In 1995, Baki and Roger Fisher received a request from the President Sixto Durán Ballén to participate in the peace deliberations of the Cenepa War between Ecuador and Peru. Both accepted and agreed to cooperate, moving to Ecuador and were involved in the process that led to the Brasilia Presidential Act in 1998. In the same year, Jamil Mahuad, the new president of Ecuador, appointed Baki the Ecuadorian Ambassador to the United States of America, the first woman appointed to this office. In this position, Baki played a key role in achieving favorable trade agreements with the United States.

In 2000, Baki founded the Galapagos Conservancy Foundation, after an oil spill took place in the Galapagos Islands, with the aid of American tycoon Donald Trump, whom she had met and befriended during a diplomatic trip to the United States. During the 2002 Ecuadorian general election, Baki made a failed attempt for the Presidency of Ecuador as head of META.

=== Ministry of Industries and Productivity ===
On 15 January 2003, Baki was appointed Minister of Industries and Productivity by President Lucio Gutiérrez, yet again becoming the first woman to occupy that office. While holding this office, Baki also managed to have Miss Universe 2004 hosted in Quito, Ecuador thanks to her friendship to Donald Trump, owner of the company that organized the event. In response to criticism levied at her over the high cost of the event, Baki said that the money was "an investment" and not an expense and that it would provide an "excellent opportunity to promote the country [Ecuador] abroad." Another landmark of Baki's running of the Ministry was her attempt to establish a Free Trade Agreement with the United States, which was widely criticized by indigenous groups, who held demonstrations against Baki's ministry.

=== Later political activity ===
During the 2006 legislative election, Baki was elected to the Andean Parliament to represent the Patriotic Society Party. Once her membership of the Andean Parliament began, the Ecuadorian delegation proposed as a candidate for the Presidency of the Parliament for the 2007–2009 term.

At the beginning of 2010, she was elected head of the team negotiating Yasuní-ITT Initiative by President Rafael Correa with the objective of raising 3,600 million dollars from the international community in exchange for the cessation of exploiting of approximately 846 million barrels of oil underneath Yasuni National Park. The project could not achieve these goals and was dissolved mid-2013.

In February 2020, Baki was confirmed as Ambassador to the United States by President Lenín Moreno. In February 2024 she became Ecuador's ambassador in Paris but that appointment was terminated on 6 November 2024 by President Noboa.
