= Karen Cummings =

Guyanese politician

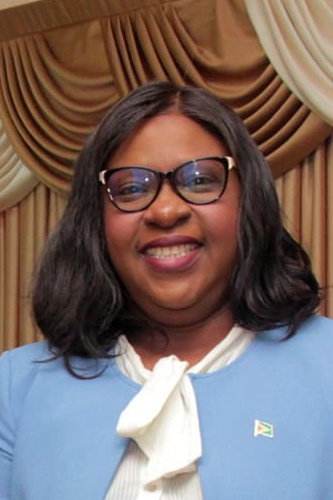

Foreign Minister
- In office 2 May 2019 – 2 August 2020
- President: David A. Granger
- Preceded by: Carl Barrington Greenidge
- Succeeded by: Hugh Todd

Personal details
- Born: Karen Roslyn Vanessa Cummings Berbice, Guyana
- Education: University of Guyana; St George's University; Walden University

Karen Roslyn Vanessa Cummings is a Guyanese politician who was the country's Foreign Minister from May 2019 to August 2020.

== Early life and education ==
Cummings is from Berbice and graduated from Bishops' High School. She has a Bachelor of Science in physics and a MBBS from the University of Guyana as well as a Masters of Public Health from St. George's University, Grenada. As of 2016, she was undertaking a Doctorate in Public Health from Walden University in the United States.

== Career ==
Cummings was a medical registrar at the Georgetown Public Hospital as well as a Government Medical Officer and Regional Medical Superintendent.

Cummings became a Member of Parliament in 2014, and advocated for gender equality and healthcare reform. She was sworn in as a junior minister, Minister within the Ministry of Public Health in the Cabinet of the APNU + AFC Cabinet on 20 May 2015.

Cummings was appointed Foreign Minister by President David A. Granger on 2 May 2019, replacing Carl Barrington Greenidge who was one of four government ministers forced to resign after the High Court's decision that holding dual citizenship was unconstitutional for the role. Cummings admitted to reporters that she was surprised at being chosen for the role but that she was "prepared for the task."

During the March 2020 presidential election, it was reported that Cummings had met with international observers and warned that their credentials might be withdrawn because the government was unhappy with statements they had made, and received criticism from former Barbados Prime Minister Owen Arthur among others for threatening them in their role as observers. The government subsequently issued a statement saying "We regret any misunderstanding the comments of the Foreign Affairs Minister may have caused."
