= Minister of Agriculture (Guyana) =

Cooperative Republic of Guyana Ministry of Agriculture

Agency overview
- Jurisdiction: Guyana
- Headquarters: Georgetown
- Agency executive: Zulfikar Mustapha, M.P, Minister of Agriculture
- Website: agriculture.gov.gy

The Minister of Agriculture is a member of the executive branch of government in the country of Guyana. He or she is based at the Ministry of Agriculture, in Regent Street, Georgetown. The current minister is Zulfikar Mustapha, who was appointed to the position in 2020.

== List of ministers ==
- John Sydney Dash (1930-1947) (as Director of Agriculture in British Guiana)
- Cheddi Jagan (May 1953-December 1953) (as Minister of Agriculture, Forests, Lands and Mines)
- Frank McDavid (1954-1957) (as Member for Agriculture, Forests and Lands and Mines)
- Llewellyn John (1964-1966)
- Robert James Jordan (1969-1973) (as Minister of Agriculture and Natural Resources)
- Ptolemy Reid (1973-1980) (as Minister of National Development and Agriculture)
- Joseph Adolphus Tyndall (1980-1985)
- Robert Herman Orlando Corbin (1985-1992)
- Reepu Daman Persaud (1992-1997)
- Reepu Daman Persaud (1997-2001) (as Minister of Agriculture and Parliamentary Affairs)
- Navindranauth Omanand Chandarpal (2001-2006)
- Robert M. Persaud (2006-2015)
- Noel Holder (2015-2020)
- Zulfikar Mustapha (2020-)
