= Ministry of Foreign Affairs (Guyana) =

Foreign ministry of Guyana

Coordinates: 6.806236°N 58.151574°W

Co-operative Republic of Guyana Ministry of Foreign Affairs

- Hugh Todd

Agency overview
- Jurisdiction: Guyana and its diplomatic missions worldwide
- Headquarters: 254 South Road & Shiv Chanderpaul Drive, Georgetown
- Agency executives: Hugh Todd, Minister of Foreign Affairs; Robert Persaud, Foreign Secretary; Elisabeth Anne Harper, Permanent Secretary
- Website: minfor.gov.gy

The Ministry of Foreign Affairs and International Cooperation is the government ministry of Guyana responsible for directing the nation's external relations and the operations of its international diplomatic missions. Hugh Todd has directed the ministry as Minister of Foreign Affairs since August 2020. The ministry is located in the capital city, Georgetown.

== Diplomacy ==
Responsibilities of the ministry include the management of bilateral relations with individual nations and its representation in international organizations, including the United Nations and the Commonwealth of Nations, among others. It also oversees visas, work permits, and immigration affairs.

== Departments ==
- Frontiers Department
- Foreign Trade Department
- Department of Americas
- Diaspora Affairs Unit
- Multilateral and Global Affairs Department
- Bilateral Affairs Department
- Department of International Cooperation

== List of ministers ==
The following is a list of foreign ministers of Guyana since its founding in 1966:

No.	Name (Birth–Death)	Portrait	Tenure
1	Forbes Burnham (1923–1985)		1966–1972
2	Sir Shridath Ramphal (1928–2024)		1972–1975
3	Frederick Wills (1928–1992)		1975–1978
4	Rashleigh Jackson (1929–2022)		1978–1990
5	Desmond Hoyte (1929–2002)		1990–1992
6	Cheddi Jagan (1918–1997)		1992
7	Clement Rohee (b. 1950)		1992–2001
8	Rudy Insanally (1936–2023)		2001–2008
9	Carolyn Rodrigues (b. 1973)		2008–2015
10	Carl Barrington Greenidge (b. 1949)		2015–2019
11	Karen Cummings		2019–2020
12	Hugh Todd		2020–present

== See also ==
- List of diplomatic missions of Guyana
- Foreign relations of Guyana
- Politics of Guyana
