= Rudy Insanally =

Guyananese diplomat and politician (1936–2023)

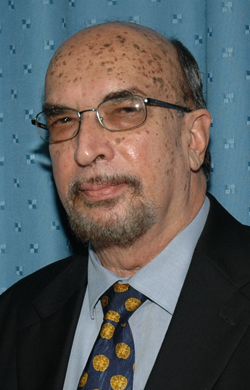
- Insanally in 2006

President of the United Nations General Assembly
- In office 1993–1994
- Preceded by: Stoyan Ganev
- Succeeded by: Amara Essy

Minister of Foreign Affairs
- In office 2001–2008
- President: Bharrat Jagdeo
- Preceded by: Clement Rohee
- Succeeded by: Carolyn Rodrigues

Personal details
- Born: Samuel Rudolph Insanally; 23 January 1936 Georgetown, British Guyana
- Died: 26 November 2023 (aged 87)

Samuel Rudolph Insanally (23 January 1936 – 26 November 2023) was a Guyanese diplomat. He was Guyana's Permanent Representative to the United Nations from 1987 onwards and was Minister of Foreign Affairs of Guyana from 2001 to 2008.

== Early life ==
Insanally was born in Georgetown, Guyana on 23 January 1936. Before his career as a diplomat began, he taught French and Spanish in Jamaica at Kingston College and Jamaica College, as well as in Guyana at Queen's College and the University of Guyana.

== Diplomatic career ==
In his first diplomatic posting, he was Counsellor to Guyana's Embassy to the United States from 1966 to 1969, and he subsequently became Guyana's chargé d'affaires in Venezuela in 1970. He was briefly his country's Deputy Permanent Representative to the United Nations in 1972, then served as Ambassador to Venezuela (with additional accreditation for Colombia, Ecuador, and Peru) from 1972 to 1978. After this posting, he was Permanent Representative to the European Economic Community and Ambassador to Belgium; although living in Brussels, he was also Ambassador to Austria, Norway, and Sweden at this time.

Subsequently, having returned to Guyana, Insanally was Head of the Political Division covering the Western Hemisphere, also serving as Ambassador to Colombia and as High Commissioner to a number of Caribbean nations. He became the Permanent Representative (ambassador) of Guyana to the United Nations on 18 February 1987. At the UN, he was vice-president of the United Nations Council for Namibia prior to Namibian independence in 1990, and in April 1990 he was Vice-president/Rapporteur of the Special Session of the General Assembly on International Economic Cooperation. He was the President of the Forty-eighth session of the United Nations General Assembly, which was held from 1993 to 1994. He was the longest serving delegate at the time to the United Nations. In the course of Insanally's duties at the Permanent Mission to the UN, he concurrently served as Ambassador to Japan from 1992.

During his presidency, he convened a World Hearing on Development attended by a large number of eminent persons, including experts, academics and practitioners of development in June 1994. He also served as Chairman of the Open Ended Working Group on the question of Equitable Representation on and increase of the Membership of the Security Council.

Insanally was Chancellor of the University of Guyana from 1994 to 2001. He became Minister of Foreign Affairs in May 2001. After seven years in that post, the government announced on 28 March 2008 that Insanally had decided to resign as Foreign Minister for "health and other personal reasons", although he would "continue to discharge certain other responsibilities in his engagement with Government". His replacement, Carolyn Rodrigues, was sworn in on 10 April.

== Personal life and death ==
Rudy Insanally was married to Bonita, and had one daughter, Dr. Amanda Insanally-Nunez. He died on 26 November 2023, at the age of 87.

== Publications ==
- Rudy Insanally, Multilateral Diplomacy for Small States: "The art of letting others have your way" (2012)
- Rudy Insanally, Dancing Between the Raindrops: A Dispatch From A Small State Diplomat (2015)
- Rudy Insanally, The Guyanese Culture: Fusion or Diffusion. (2018)
- S.R. Insanally, The Mystery of God: The Principles of God Diplomacy. (2020)

== Honors ==
- Order of Roraima (O.R). 1995. (Guyana ).
- Order of the Liberator. Grand Cordon. 1978 (Venezuela).
- Order of the Southern Cross, Grand Cordon. 2003. (Brazil).
- Order of the Rising Sun, Grand Cordon, 2009 (Japan).
- Doctor of Laws (Hon.) Mount Holyoke College, Massachusetts. (USA).

== Yearly achievements ==
Year	Achievement
1959–1996	Prior to 1966 Insanally held teaching positions in modern languages from 1959 to 1966 at Kingston and Jamaica Colleges, Jamaica; Queen's College, Guyana; and at the University of Guyana.
1966–1969	Counselor at the Guyana Embassy in Washington, D.C.
1970	Appointed Charge d'affaires in Caracas, Venezuela
1972	Transferred to the Permanent Mission of Guyana to the United Nations where as Deputy Permanent Representative, he was active in the negotiations for the Second Development Decade Strategy.
1972–1978	He returned as Ambassador to Venezuela with concurrent accreditation to Colombia, Ecuador and Peru. During this period, he participated in the work of various regional organizations such as the Caribbean Community (CARICOM), the Organization of American States (OAS), the Economic Commission for Latin America and the Caribbean (ECLAC), the Caribbean Development and Cooperation Committee (CDCC) and the Latin American Economic System (SELA).
1981	Permanent Representative to the European Economic Community in Brussels where he also served as Ambassador to Belgium and on a non-resident basis to Austria, Norway and Sweden. Played a prominent role in the negotiation of the Second Lome (ACP-EEC) Convention. Elected Chairman of the Sugar Sub-Committee on several occasions and later Chairman of the Trade Sub-Committee for the negotiation of a Protocol to provide for the enlargement of the Community. Appointed Special Rapporteur for the Joint ACP-EEC Assembly on the implementation of the Lome Convention.
1982	Returned to Guyana as Head of the Political Division covering the Western Hemisphere. Served as roving High Commissioner to several Caribbean countries and as Ambassador to Colombia. During this period, he was also a member of the Board of - Governors of the Institute of International Relations, St. Augustine, Trinidad and Tobago.
1987	Occupied the post of Permanent Representative to the United Nations. In this capacity, he was
1993	Elected President of the forty-eighth Session of the United Nations General Assembly and during that period served as Chairman of the Working Group on the Reform of the Security Council. Also presided over the World Hearings on Development held at UN Headquarters.
1994–2001	Served as Chancellor of the University of Guyana.
1981	Attended high-level meetings of many other international and regional organizations such as the Non-Aligned Movement, the Group of 77 and the Commonwealth. Participated in the North/South Summit held in Cancun, Mexico.
1999	Served as Chairman of the Group of 77 and as Chairman of the Preparatory Committee for the South Summit.
2001	Member of the Council of Presidents of the General Assembly of the United Nations.

Diplomatic posts
Preceded by Stoyan Ganev	President of the United Nations General Assembly; 1993–1994	Succeeded by Amara Essy
