= UN Web TV =

Public affairs TV arm of the United Nations

UN Web TV is the public affairs digital distribution arm of the United Nations. It broadcasts live and recorded gavel-to-gavel meetings of various United Nations agencies and arms from around the world, including the General Assembly and the Security Council. It is part of the News and Media Division of the United Nations Department of Global Communications.

In addition, three series are produced and broadcast on UNTV:

- 21st Century
- UN in Action
- Year in Review
