= Permanent Representative of Guyana to the United Nations =

This is a list of permanent representatives of Guyana to the United Nations.

- Sir John Carter; 21 September 1966
- E. R. Braithwaite; 4 January 1967
- Aloysius Paterson Thompson; 19 August 1969
- Frederick Hilborn Talbot; 19 July 1971
- Rashleigh Esmond Jackson; 30 January 1973
- Noel G. Sinclair; 7 March 1979
- Samuel Rudolph Insanally; 18 February 1987
- Rudolph Michael Ten-Pow; 22 August 2016
- Carolyn Rodrigues-Birkett; 2020
