= Foreign Secretary (Guyana) =

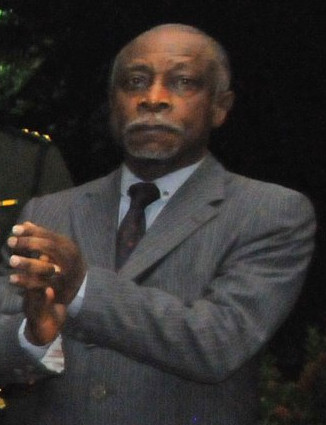
Foreign Secretary Carl B. Greenidge (2019–2020)

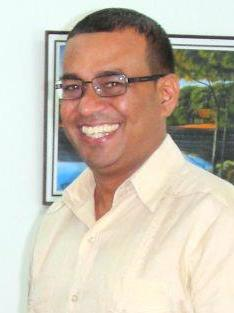
Foreign Secretary Robert M. Persaud (since 2020)

The foreign secretary is a senior official within the Ministry of Foreign Affairs and International Cooperation of the Co-operative Republic of Guyana. In the organisational structure, the foreign secretary ranks below the minister.

== History ==
The first foreign secretary was Carl Greenidge. Appointed to serve as Minister of Foreign Affairs and International Cooperation in the cabinet of President David Granger in 2015, Greenidge was forced to resign his seat in the National Assembly (and, as a consequence, his ministerial role) in April 2019 following a decision by Chief Justice Roxane George-Wiltshire, handed down on 31 January 2019 and later upheld on appeal, that ruled holders of dual nationality were ineligible to serve as members of parliament. (Note: At the time Greenidge was a citizen of both Guyana and the United Kingdom;'"`UNIQ--ref-00000007-QINU`"' he renounced his British nationality in October 2019 with a view to standing in the 2020 election.'"`UNIQ--ref-00000008-QINU`"') The Ministry of the Presidency announced his appointment as foreign secretary on 14 May 2019 following the creation of the position.

While supporting Greenidge's return to the Ministry of Foreign Affairs, particularly his responsibility for the border dispute with Venezuela, former president and Leader of the Opposition Bharrat Jagdeo criticised the creation of the foreign secretary position and the scope of its portfolio. "So what is the portfolio of the minister?" he asked. He also questioned the terminology chosen for the post: "In the UK, the Foreign Secretary is the minister. What happens to the minister... and what happens to the Director General?"

Despite those objections, following the 2020 general election, which saw Jagdeo's People's Progressive Party/Civic returned to power, the position of foreign secretary was maintained by the new government. The second holder of the office, Robert Persaud, was appointed by Foreign Minister Hugh Todd on 17 August 2020.
