= Secretary of State (disambiguation) =

The secretary of state is a senior government position in several countries.

Secretary of State may also refer to:

- Secretary of State (Ancien Régime), a government position in France in the 16th–18th centuries
- Secretary of State (Canada), a title given to some Ministers of State from 1993 to 2008
  - Secretary of State (Asia-Pacific), a former federal government position in Canada
  - Secretary of State (Science, Research and Development), a former federal government position in Canada
  - Secretary of State (Western Economic Diversification), a former federal government position in Canada
- Secretary of State (Ireland), a government office until 1801
- Secretary of State (Mexico), a member of the cabinet
- State Secretary (Netherlands), a junior member of the Cabinet
- State Secretary (Norway), a partisan political position within the executive branch of government
- Secretary of State (United Kingdom), a Cabinet minister in charge of a government department
  - Secretary of State (England), a post from 1253 to 1645
  - Secretary of State (Kingdom of Scotland), a senior post in the government until 1709
- United States Secretary of State, a federal government official in charge of foreign affairs
  - Secretary of state (U.S. state government), an official in most state governments of the United States
