= Carolyn Rodrigues =

Guyanese politician (born 1973)

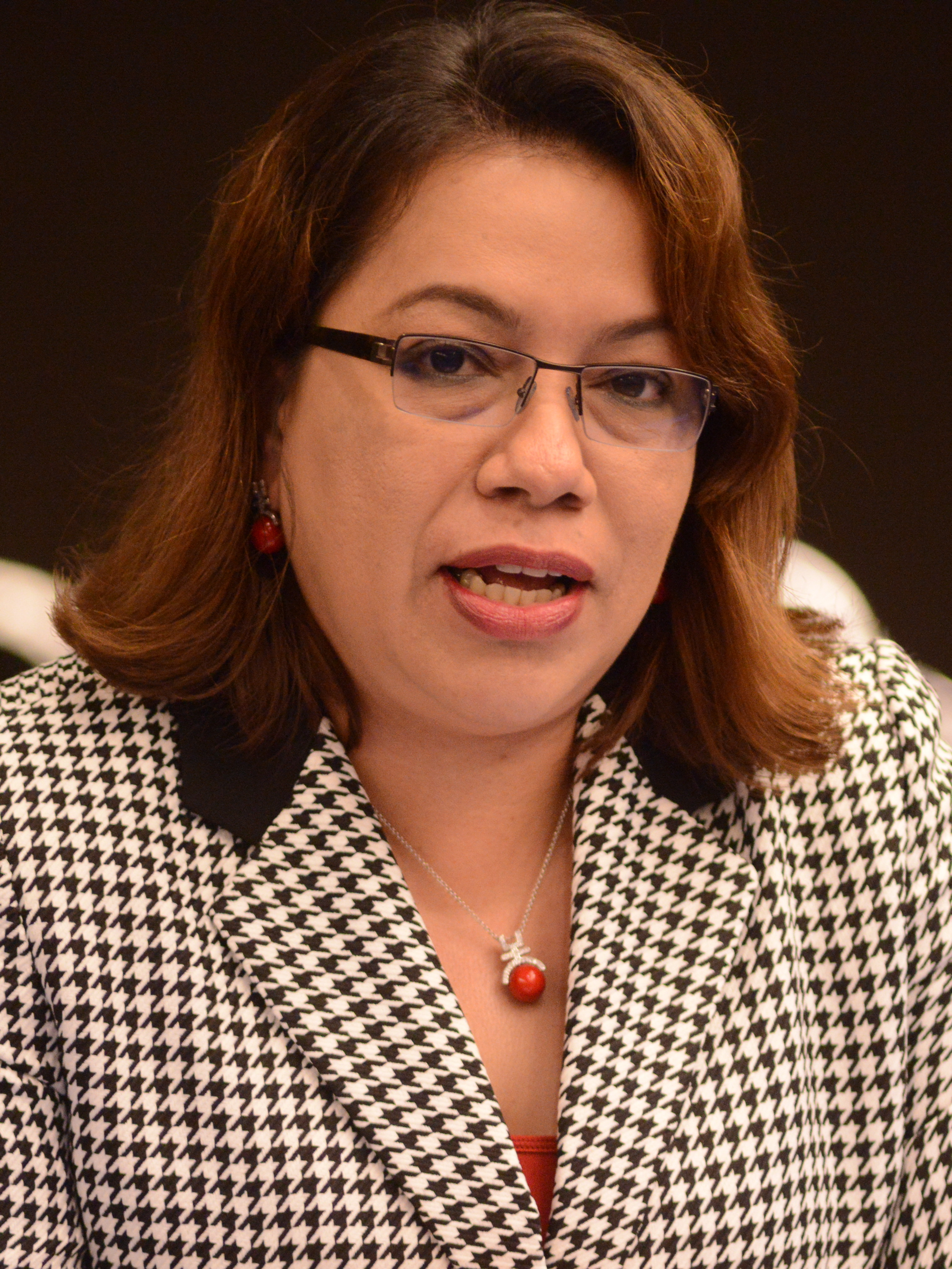
- Rodrigues in 2015

Permanent Representative of Guyana to the United Nations
- Incumbent
- Assumed office 2 October 2020
- President: Irfaan Ali
- Preceded by: Rudolph Michael Ten-Pow

Minister of Foreign Affairs
- In office 10 April 2008 – 16 May 2015
- President: Bharrat Jagdeo; Donald Ramotar
- Preceded by: Rudy Insanally
- Succeeded by: Carl Barrington Greenidge

Minister of Amerindian Affairs
- In office April 2001 – 4 January 2008
- President: Bharrat Jardel
- Preceded by: Vilbert De Souza
- Succeeded by: Pauline Campbell-Sukhai

Member of the National Assembly
- In office 2001–2015
- Constituency: National Top-Up

Personal details
- Born: 16 September 1973 (age 53) Santa Rosa, Barima-Waini Region, Guyana
- Party: PPP/C
- Spouse: Roland Birkett
- Children: 3
- Education: University of Regina; University of Guyana; Open University of Catalonia
- Occupation: Politician; business administrator; social worker

Carolyn Allison Rodrigues-Birkett (born 16 September 1973) is a Guyanese politician and former foreign minister who has served as her country's Permanent Representative to the United Nations since 2020.

== Early life and education ==
Rodrigues was born on 16 September 1973 to an Arawak Amerindian family in Santa Rosa in the Barima-Waini region of Guyana. After growing up in a home without running water or electricity, studying with the help of an oil lamp, she attended a private school in Georgetown and later received a scholarship for Amerindians that enabled her to study business administration at the University of Regina in Canada. She enrolled at the University of Guyana in 2001 to study social work. She also studied international affairs at the Open University of Catalonia.

== Career ==
=== Early career ===
Rodrigues returned to Guyana in 1993 and began working for a lumber company. Under the terms of her scholarship, she was required to work for Amerindian communities, and found employment with the Inter-American Development Bank's social impact amelioration programme, despite a 65% decrease in salary. She coordinated an Amerindian projects programme until 2001.

=== Politics ===
In April 2001 Rodrigues was appointed to the Cabinet as Minister of Amerindian Affairs, and was reappointed to the role following the 2006 general election, serving until January 2008. In April of that year she became Minister of Foreign Affairs, serving until the People's Progressive Party lost the general election in May 2015. She was subsequently offered a place on the party's parliamentary list, but declined to take a seat in the National Assembly.

=== International career ===
In August 2017 Rodrigues was appointed Director of the Food and Agriculture Organization's liaison office with the United Nations in Geneva, serving in that role until 2020 when she became her country's Permanent Representative to the United Nations in New York.

On 15 June 2026, the Guyanese government nominated Rodrigues as a candidate in the 2026 United Nations Secretary-General selection.
