= List of diplomatic missions of Guyana =

This is a list of diplomatic missions of Guyana, excluding honorary consulates. Diplomatic relations are managed primarily by Guyana's Ministry of Foreign Affairs.

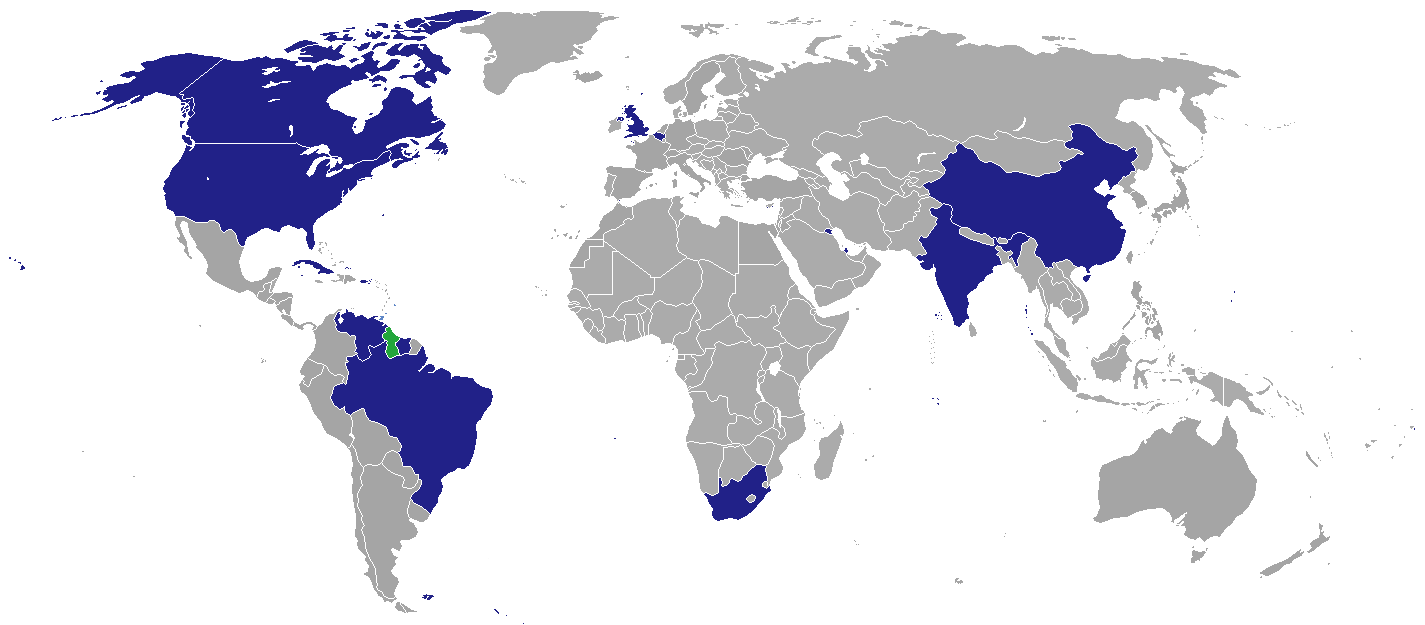
Map of countries with a Guyanese diplomatic presence

== Current missions ==
=== Africa ===
Host country	Host city	Mission	Concurrent accreditation	Ref.
South Africa	Pretoria	High Commission	Countries: Botswana	

=== Americas ===
Host country	Host city	Mission	Concurrent accreditation	Ref.
Barbados	Bridgetown	Consulate-General		
Brazil	Brasília	Embassy	Countries: Azerbaijan; Georgia	
Brazil	Boa Vista	Consulate-General	Countries: Azerbaijan; Georgia	
Canada	Ottawa	High Commission		
Canada	Toronto	Consulate-General		
Cuba	Havana	Embassy		
Suriname	Paramaribo	Embassy		
Suriname	Nieuw Nickerie	Consulate-General		
Trinidad and Tobago	Port of Spain	Consulate-General		
United States	Washington, D.C.	Embassy	Countries: Guatemala; Mexico; International Organizations: Organization of American States	
United States	New York City	Consulate-General	Countries: Guatemala; Mexico; International Organizations: Organization of American States	
Venezuela	Caracas	Embassy		

=== Asia ===
Host country	Host city	Mission	Concurrent accreditation	Ref.
China	Beijing	Embassy	Countries: Japan; Singapore; South Korea; Thailand	
India	New Delhi	High Commission	Countries: Bangladesh; Sri Lanka	
Kuwait	Kuwait City	Embassy	Countries: Bahrain; Oman; Saudi Arabia; United Arab Emirates; International Organization: Organisation of Islamic Cooperation	
Qatar	Doha	Embassy		

=== Europe ===
Host country	Host city	Mission	Concurrent accreditation	Ref.
Belgium	Brussels	Embassy	Countries: Austria; Denmark; Germany; Netherlands; Portugal; Spain; International Organizations: European Union; Organisation of African, Caribbean and Pacific States	
United Kingdom	London	High Commission	Countries: Bulgaria; Croatia; Estonia; France; Holy See; Iceland; Latvia; Lithuania; Russia; International Organizations: Commonwealth of Nations; International Maritime Organization; UNESCO	

=== Multilateral organizations ===
Organization	Host city	Host country	Mission	Ref.
United Nations	New York City	United States	Permanent Mission	

== Gallery ==
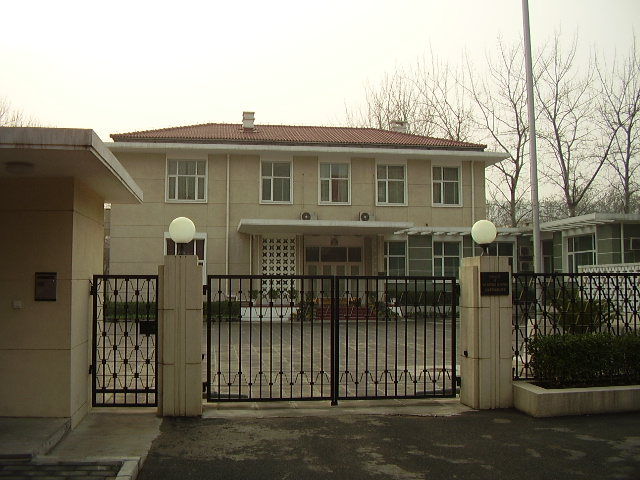
Embassy in Beijing

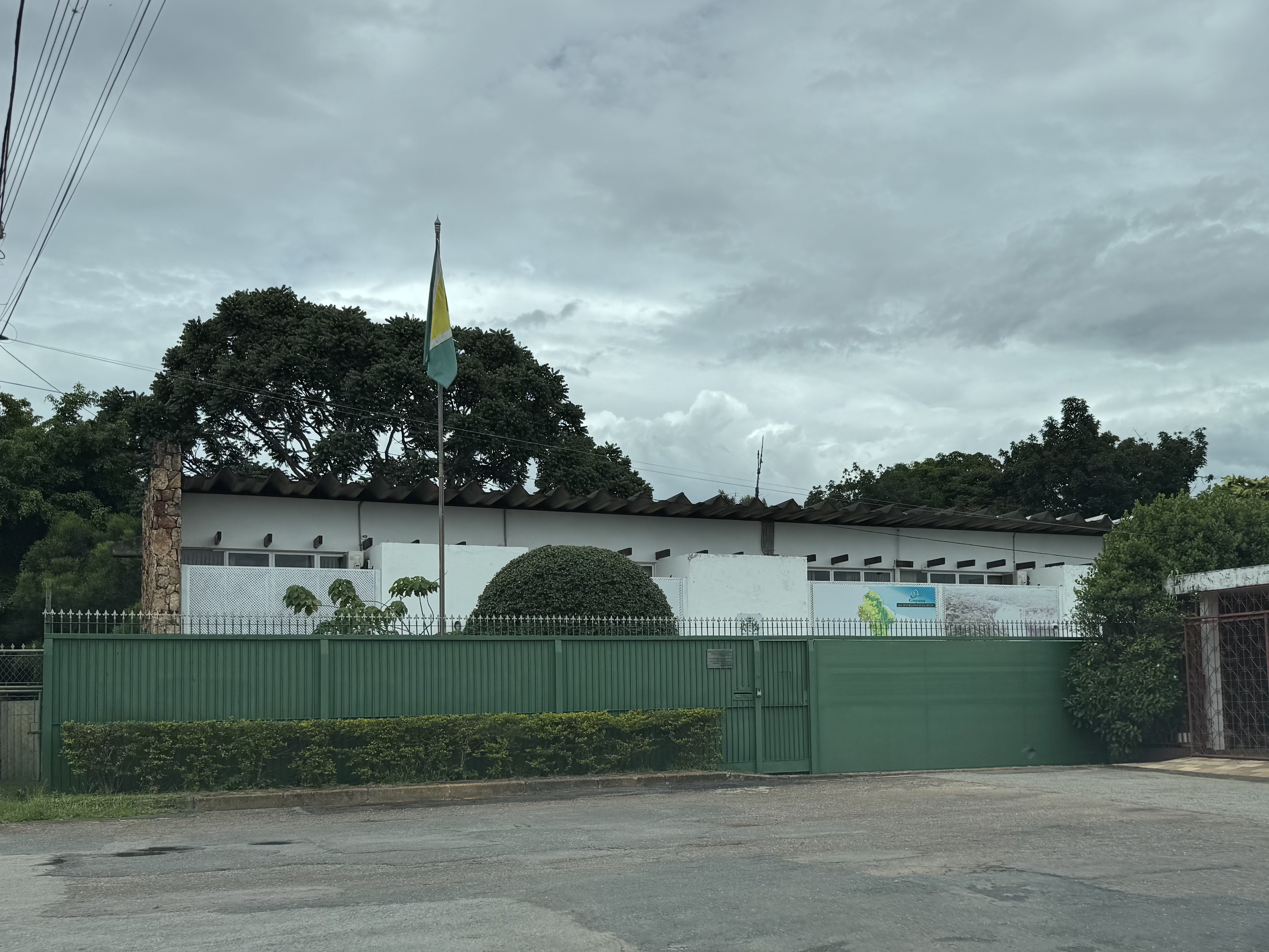
Embassy in Brasília

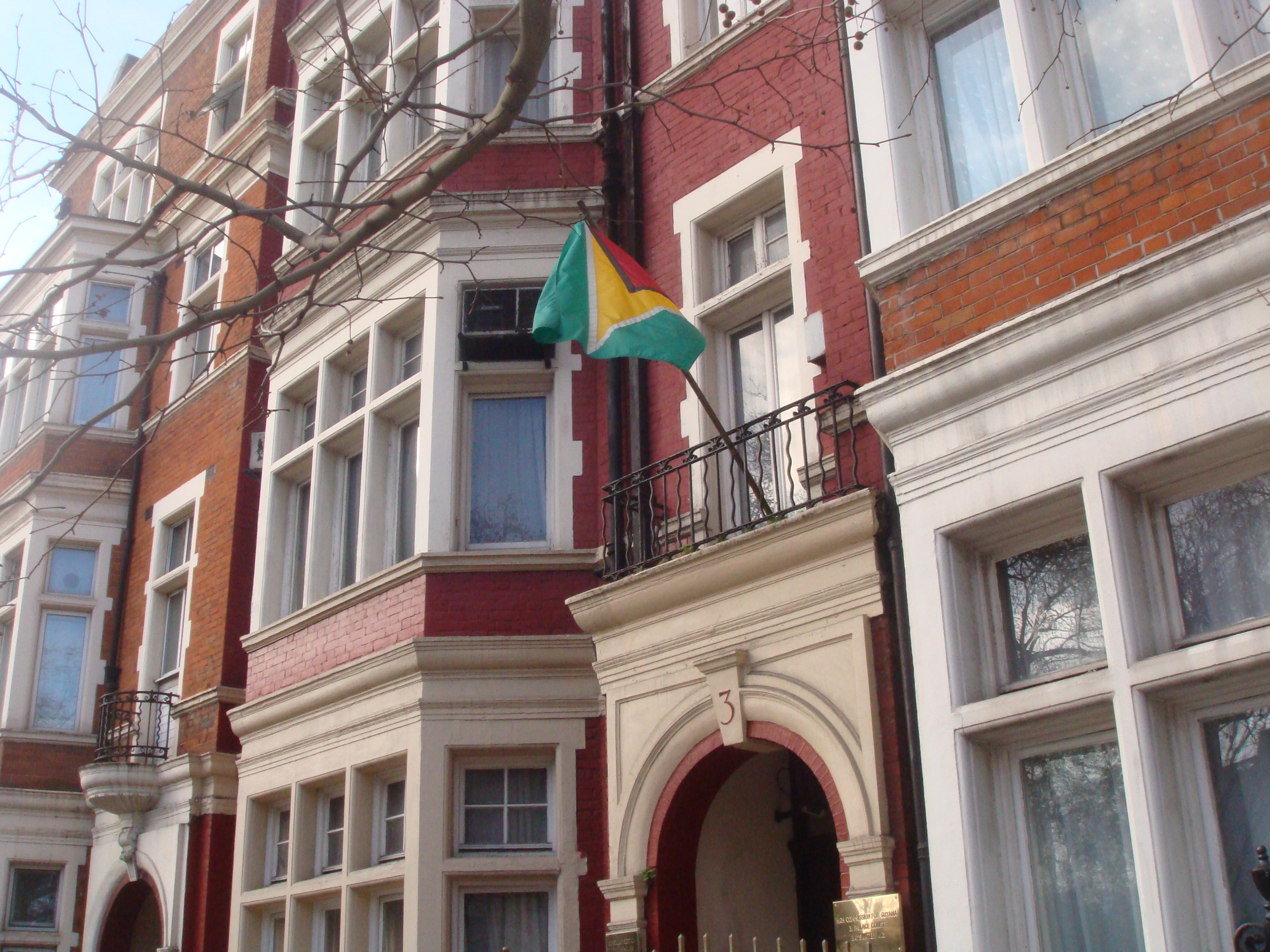
High Commission in London

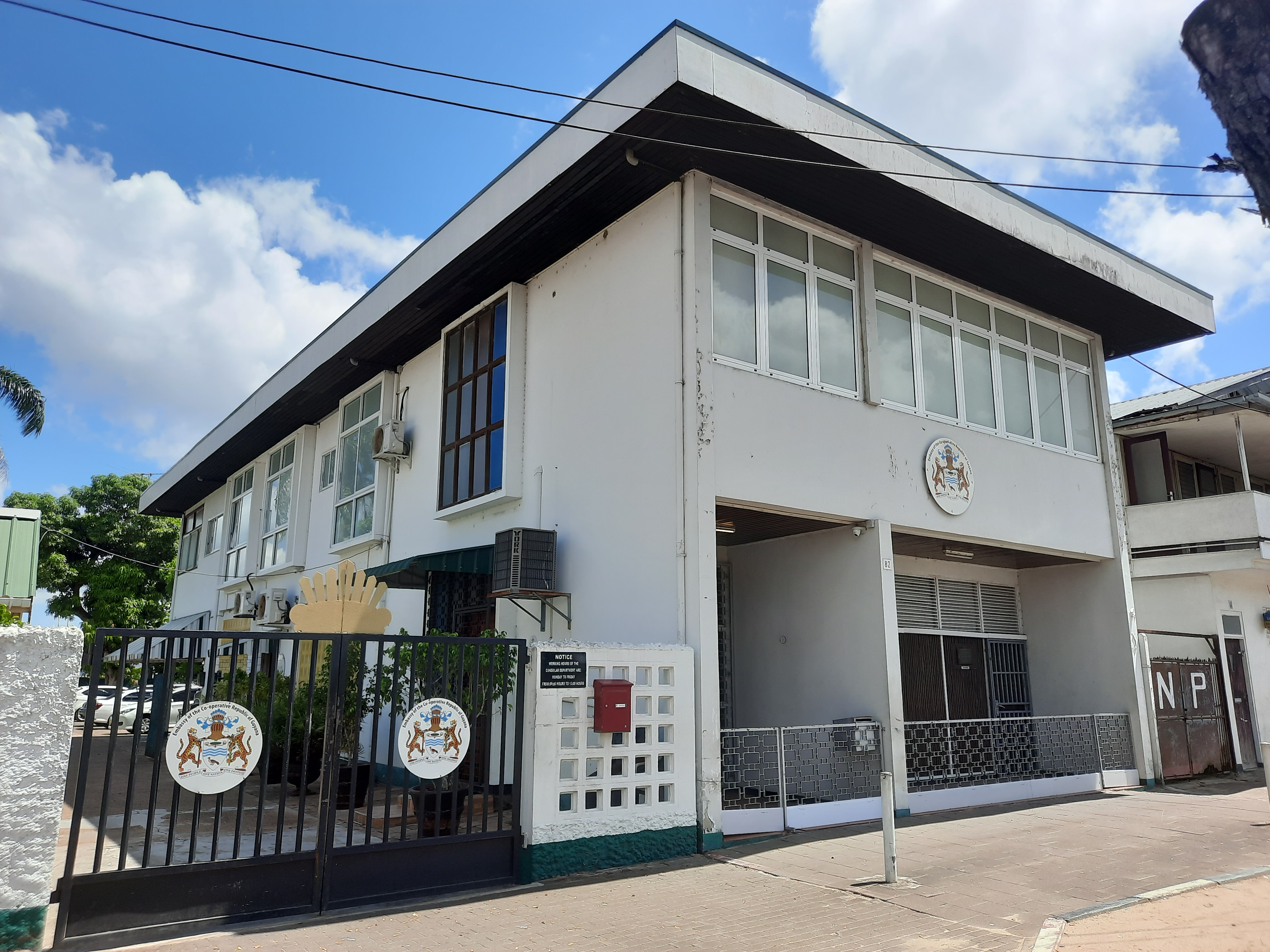
Embassy in Paramaribo

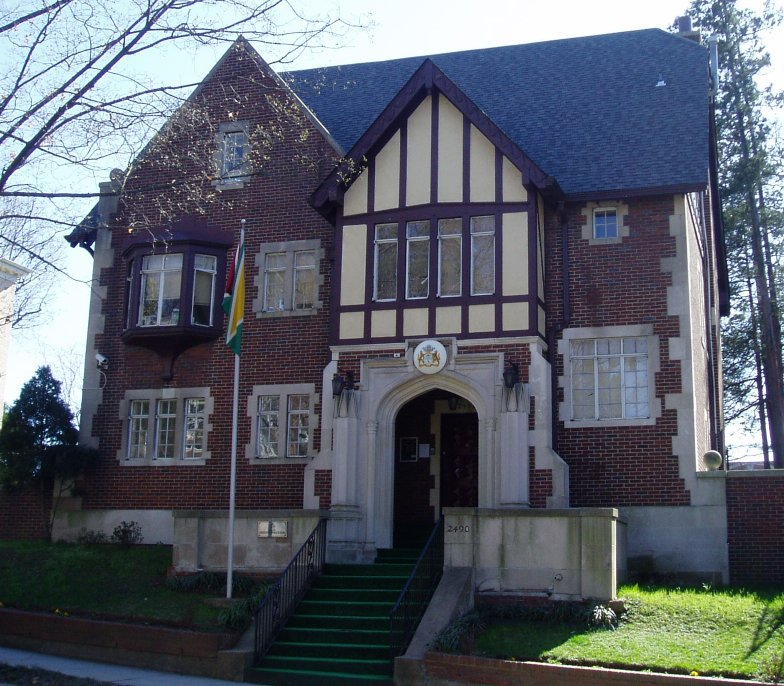
Embassy in Washington, D.C.

== Closed missions ==
=== Americas ===
Host country	Host city	Mission	Year closed	Ref.
Jamaica	Kingston	High Commission	Unknown	

== See also ==
- Ministry of Foreign Affairs (Guyana)
- Foreign relations of Guyana
- List of diplomatic missions in Guyana
