= Robert Persaud =

Guyana's Foreign Secretary and former Government minister

Robert M. Persaud
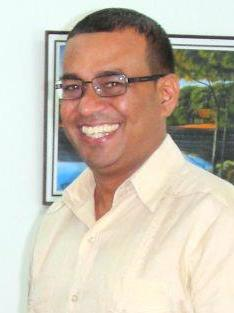
- Persaud in 2012

Foreign Secretary
- Incumbent
- Assumed office 17 August 2020
- President: Irfaan Ali
- Preceded by: Carl Barrington Greenidge

Minister of Agriculture
- In office 2006–2015
- Preceded by: Navindranauth Omanand Chandarpal
- Succeeded by: Noel Holder

Personal details
- Born: Robert Montgomery Persaud; 9 May 1974 (age 51) Berbice, Guyana
- Party: People's Progressive Party
- Occupation: Foreign Secretary
- Known for: Former Minister of Government

Robert Montgomery Persaud (born 9 May 1974 in Berbice, Guyana) is the Foreign Secretary of Guyana as of 17 August 2020, and a former government minister.

== Biography ==
Persaud graduated Master in Business Administration from the University of West Indies in 2005.

In 1993, he began his career as editor for the Mirror Newspaper. In 1999, he was appointed Presidential Advisor. In 2001, Persaud served in the Cabinet of the Ministry of Natural Resources. From 2006 to 2011, he was served as Minister of Agriculture

From 2011 until 2015, Persaud served as Minister of Natural Resources and the Environment.

On 17 August 2020, he was appointed Foreign Secretary.
