= Historiography of the British Empire =

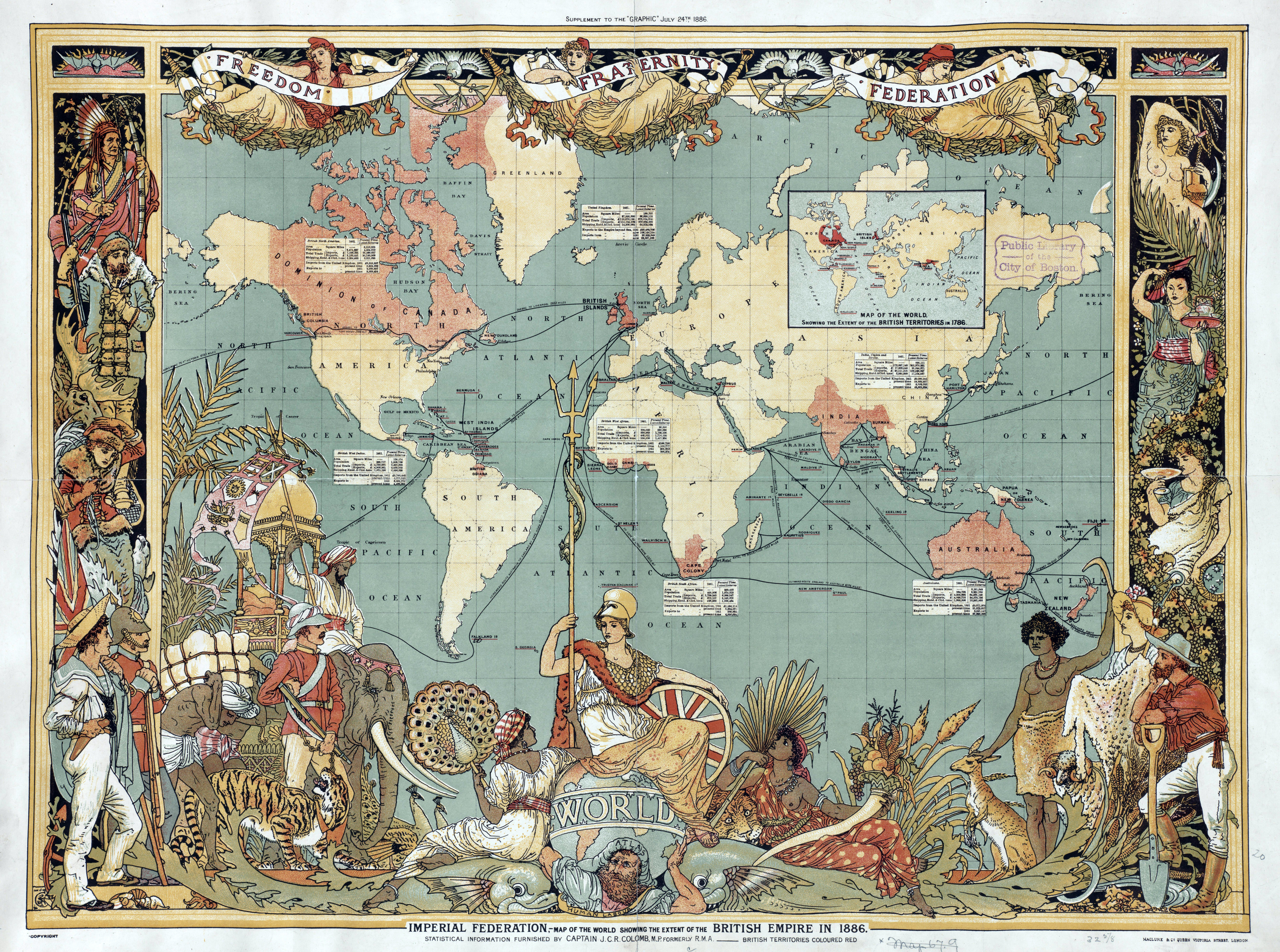
The Empire in red in 1886, by Walter Crane

The historiography of the British Empire refers to the studies, sources, critical methods and interpretations used by scholars to develop a history of the British Empire. Historians and their ideas are the main focus here; specific lands and historical dates and episodes are covered in the article on the British Empire. Scholars have long studied the Empire, looking at the causes for its formation, its relations to the French and other empires, and the kinds of people who became imperialists or anti-imperialists, together with their mindsets. The history of the breakdown of the Empire has attracted scholars of the histories of the United States (which broke away in 1776), the British Raj (dissolved in 1947), and the African colonies (independent in the 1960s). John Darwin (2013) identifies four imperial goals: colonising, civilising, converting, and commerce.

Historians have approached imperial history from numerous angles over the last century. In recent decades scholars have expanded the range of topics into new areas in social and cultural history, paying special attention to the impact on the natives and their agency in response. The cultural turn in historiography has recently emphasised issues of language, religion, gender, and identity. Recent debates have considered the relationship between the "metropole" (Great Britain itself, especially London), and the colonial peripheries. The "British world" historians stress the material, emotional, and financial links among the colonizers across the imperial diaspora. The "new imperial historians", by contrast, are more concerned with the Empire's impact on the metropole, including everyday experiences and images. Phillip Buckner says that by the 1990s few historians continued to portray the Empire as benevolent.

== Historical framework ==
Historians agree that the Empire was not planned by anyone. The concept of the British Empire is a construct and was never a legal entity, unlike the Roman or other European empires. There was no imperial constitution, no office of emperor, no uniformity of laws. So when it began, when it ended, and what stages it went through is a matter of opinion, not official orders or laws. The dividing line was Britain's shift in the 1763–93 period from emphasis on western to eastern territories following U.S. independence. The London bureaucracy governing the colonies also changed, policies to white settler colonies changed and slavery was phased out.

The beginning of the formation of a colonial Empire has been much studied. Tudor conquest of Ireland began in the 1530s and Cromwellian conquest of Ireland in the 1650s completed the British colonisation of Ireland. The first major history was The Expansion of England (1883), by Sir John Seeley. It was a bestseller for decades, and was widely admired by the imperialistic faction in British politics, and opposed by the anti-imperialists of the Liberal Party. The book points out how and why Britain gained the colonies, the character of the Empire, and the light in which it should be regarded. Seeley argued that British rule is in India's best interest. He also warned that India had to be protected and vastly increased the responsibilities and dangers to Britain. The book contains the much-quoted statement that "we seem, as it were, to have conquered half the world in a fit of absence of mind". Expansion of England appeared at an opportune time, and did much to make the British regard the colonies as an expansion of the British state as well as of British nationality, and to confirm to them the value of Britain's empire in the East. In his history of the British Empire, written in 1940, A. P. Newton lamented that Seeley "dealt in the main with the great wars of the eighteenth century and this gave the false impression that the British Empire has been founded largely by war and conquest, an idea that was unfortunately planted firmly in the public mind, not only in Great Britain, but also in foreign countries".

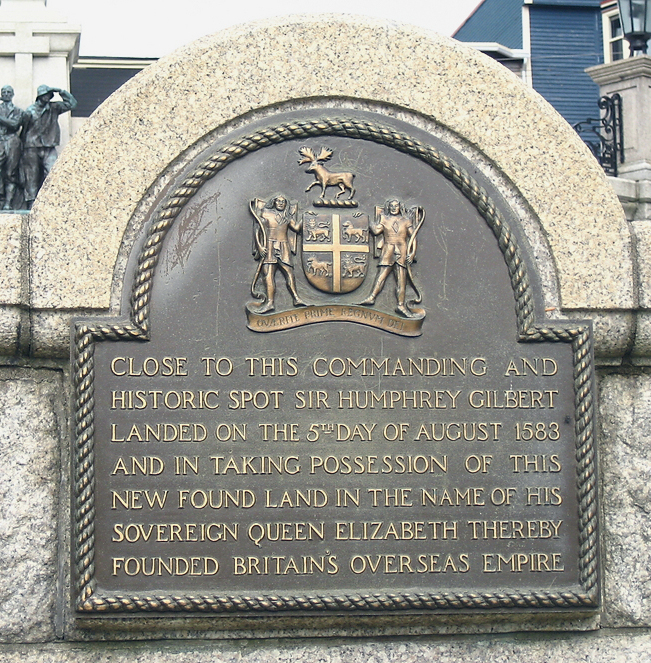
Plaque commemorating Sir Humphrey Gilbert's founding of the British Empire in St. John's, Newfoundland in 1583.

Historians often point out that in the First British Empire (before the 1780s) there was no single imperial vision, but rather a multiplicity of private operations led by different groups of English businessmen or religious groups. Although protected by the Royal Navy, they were not funded or planned by the government. After the American war, says Bruce Collins, British leaders "focused not on any military lessons to be learned, but upon the regulation and expansion of imperial trade and the readjustment of Britain's constitutional relationship with its colonies."

In the Second British Empire, by 1815 historians identify four distinct elements in the colonies. The most politically developed colonies were the self-governing colonies in the Caribbean and those that later formed Canada and Australia. India was in a category by itself, and its immense size and distance required control of the routes to it, and in turn permitted British naval dominance from the Persian Gulf to the South China Sea. The third group was a mixed bag of smaller territories, including isolated ports used as way stations to India, and emerging trade entrepots such as Hong Kong and Singapore, along with a few isolated ports in Africa. The fourth kind of empire was the "informal empire," that is financial dominance exercised through investments, as in Latin America, and including the complex situation in Egypt (it was owned theoretically by the Ottoman Empire, but ruled by Britain). Darwin argues the British Empire was distinguished by the adaptability of its builders: "The hallmark of British imperialism was its extraordinary versatility in method, outlook and object." The British tried to avoid military action in favour of reliance on networks of local elites and businessmen who voluntarily collaborated and in turn gained authority (and military protection) from British recognition.

Historians argue that Britain built an informal economic empire through control of trade and finance in Latin America after the independence of Spanish and Portuguese colonies about 1820. By the 1840s, Britain had adopted a highly successful policy of free trade that gave it dominance in the trade of much of the world. After losing its first Empire to the Americans, Britain then turned its attention towards Asia, Africa, and the Pacific. Following the defeat of Napoleonic France in 1815, Britain enjoyed a century of almost unchallenged dominance and expanded its imperial holdings around the globe. Increasing degrees of internal autonomy were granted to its white settler colonies in the 20th century.

A resurgence came in the late 19th century, with the Scramble for Africa and major additions in Asia and the Middle East. Leadership in British imperialism was expressed by Joseph Chamberlain and Lord Rosebery, and implemented in Africa by Cecil Rhodes. Other influential spokesmen included Lord Cromer, Lord Curzon, General Kitchener, Lord Milner, and the writer Rudyard Kipling. They all were influenced by Seeley's Expansion of England. The British Empire was the largest Empire that the world has ever seen both in terms of landmass and population. Its power, both military and economic, remained unmatched in 1900. In 1876 Disraeli overcame vehement Liberal opposition and obtained for Queen Victoria the title of "Empress of India" (she was not "Empress of the British Empire.")

British historians focused on the diplomatic, military and administrative aspects of the Empire before the 1960s. They saw a benevolent enterprise. Younger generations branched off into a variety of social, economic and cultural themes, and took a much more critical stance. Representative of the old tradition was the Cambridge History of India, a large-scale project published in five volumes between 1922 and 1937 by Cambridge University Press. Some volumes were also part of the simultaneous multivolume The Cambridge History of the British Empire. Production of both works was delayed by the First World War and the ill health of contributors; the India volume II had to be abandoned. Reviewers complained the research methods were too old-fashioned; one critic said it was "history as it was understood by our grandfathers".

== Idea of Empire ==
David Armitage provided an influential study of the emergence of a British imperial ideology from the time of Henry VIII to that of Robert Walpole in the 1720s and 1730s. Using a close reading of English, Scottish and Irish authors from Sir Thomas Smith (1513–77) to David Hume (1711–1776), Armitage argues that the imperial ideology was both a critical agent in the formation of a British state from three kingdoms and an essential bond between the state and the transatlantic colonies. Armitage thus links the concerns of the "New British History" with that of the Atlantic history. Before 1700, Armitage finds that contested English and Scottish versions of state and empire delayed the emergence of a unitary imperial ideology. However political economists Nicholas Barbon and Charles Davenant in the late 17th century emphasized the significance of commerce, especially mercantilism or commerce that was closed to outsiders, to the success of the state. They argued that "trade depended on liberty, and that liberty could therefore be the foundation of empire". To overcome competing versions of "empires of the seas" within Britain, Parliament undertook the regulation of the Irish economy, the Acts of Union 1707 and the formation of a unitary and organic "British" empire of the sea. Walpole's opponents in the 1730s in the "country party" and in the American colonies developed an alternative vision of empire that would be "Protestant, commercial, maritime and free". Walpole did not ensure the promised "liberty" to the colonies because he was intent on subordinating all colonial economic activity to the mercantilist advantages of the metropolis. Anti-imperial critiques emerged from Francis Hutcheson and David Hume, presaging the republicanism that swept the American colonies in the 1770s and led to the creation of a rival power.

=== Economic policy: Mercantilism ===
Historians led by Eli Heckscher have identified Mercantilism as the central economic policy for the empire before the shift to free trade in the 1840s. Mercantilism is an economic theory practice, commonly used in Britain, France and other major European nations from the 16th to the 18th century that promoted governmental regulation of a nation's economy for the purpose of augmenting state power at the expense of rival national powers. It was the economic counterpart of political absolutism. It involves a national economic policy aimed at accumulating monetary reserves through a positive balance of trade, especially of finished goods. Mercantilism dominated Western European economic policy and discourse from the 16th to late-18th centuries. Mercantilism was a cause of frequent European wars and also motivated colonial expansion.

High tariffs, especially on manufactured goods, are an almost universal feature of mercantilist policy. Other policies have included:

- Building overseas colonies;
- Forbidding colonies to trade with other nations;
- Monopolizing markets with staple ports;
- Banning the export of gold and silver, even for payments;
- Forbidding trade to be carried in foreign ships;
- Export subsidies;
- Promoting manufacturing with research or direct subsidies;
- Limiting wages;
- Maximizing the use of domestic resources;
- Restricting domestic consumption with non-tariff barriers to trade.

The term "mercantile system" was used by its foremost critic Adam Smith.

Mercantilism in its simplest form was bullionism which focused on accumulating gold and silver through clever trades (leaver the trading partner with less of his gold and silver). Mercantilist writers emphasized the circulation of money and rejected hoarding. Their emphasis on monetary metals accords with current ideas regarding the money supply, such as the stimulative effect of a growing money supply. In England, mercantilism reached its peak during the Long Parliament government (1640–1660). Mercantilist policies were also embraced throughout much of the Tudor and Stuart periods, with Robert Walpole being another major proponent. In Britain, government control over the domestic economy was far less extensive than on the Continent, limited by common law and the steadily increasing power of Parliament. Government-controlled monopolies were common, especially before the English Civil War, but were often controversial.

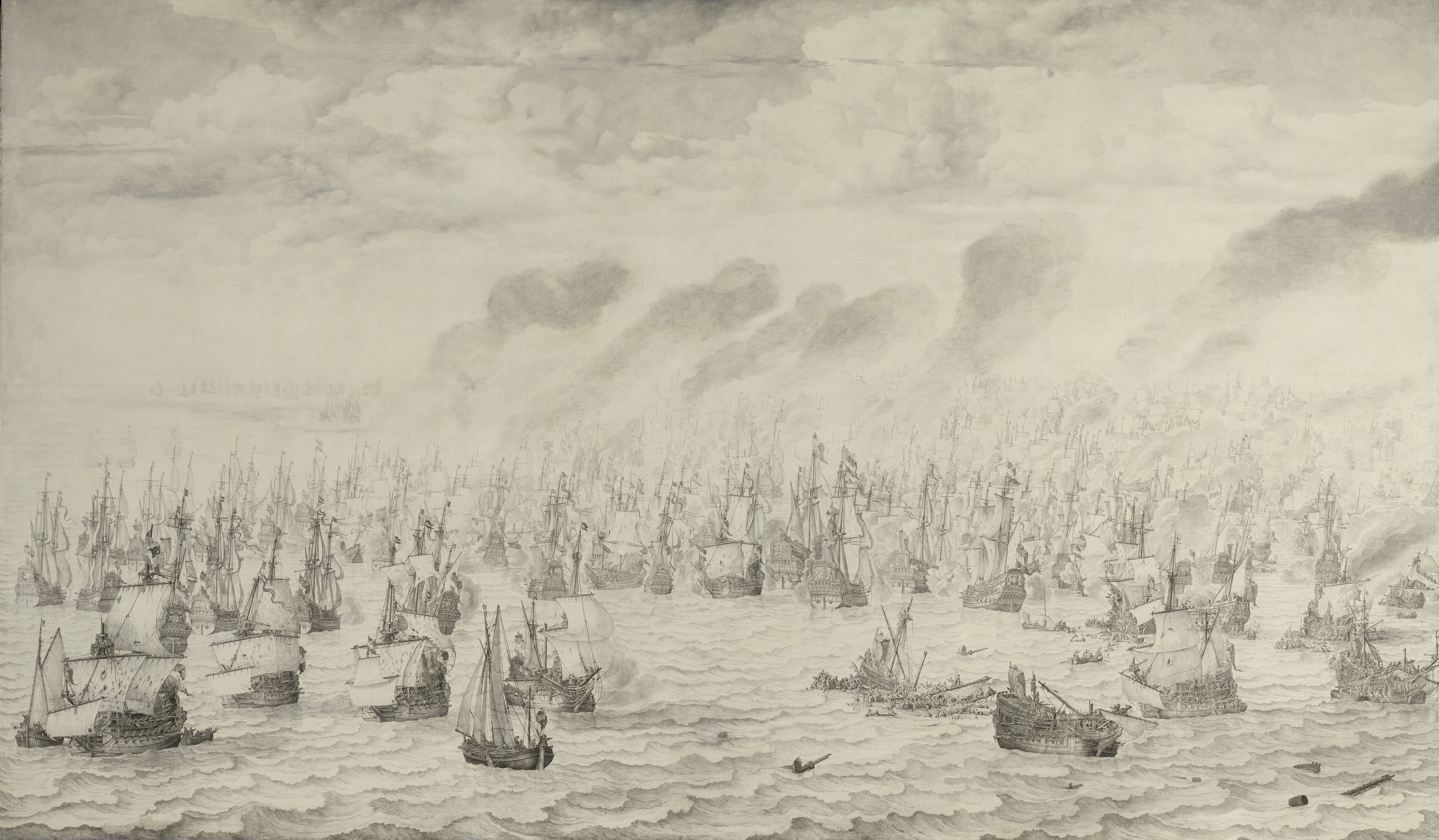
The Anglo-Dutch Wars were fought between the English and the Dutch for control over the seas and trade routes.

With respect to its colonies, British mercantilism meant that the government and the merchants became partners with the goal of increasing political power and private wealth, to the exclusion of other empires. The government protected its merchants – and kept others out – by trade barriers, regulations, and subsidies to domestic industries in order to maximize exports from and minimize imports to the realm. The government used the Royal Navy to protect the colonies and to fight smuggling – which became a favourite American technique in the 18th century to circumvent the restrictions on trading with the French, Spanish or Dutch. The goal of mercantilism was to run trade surpluses, so that gold and silver would pour into London. The government took its share through duties and taxes, with the remainder going to merchants in Britain. The colonies were captive markets for British industry, and the goal was to enrich the mother country (not the colonists).

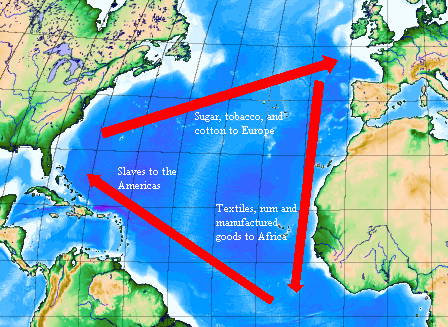
Mercantilism helped create trade patterns such as the triangular trade in the North Atlantic, in which raw materials were imported to the metropolis and then processed and redistributed to other colonies.

British mercantilist writers were themselves divided on whether domestic controls were necessary. British mercantilism thus mainly took the form of efforts to control trade. Much of the enforcement against smuggling was handled by the Royal Navy, argued Neil Stout. A wide array of regulations was put in place to encourage exports and discourage imports. Tariffs were placed on imports and bounties given for exports, and the export of some raw materials was banned completely. The Navigation Acts expelled foreign merchants from England's domestic trade. The nation aggressively sought colonies and once under British control, regulations were imposed that allowed the colony to only produce raw materials and to only trade with Britain. This led to smuggling by major merchants and political friction with the businessmen of these colonies. Mercantilist policies (such as forbidding trade with other empires and controls over smuggling) were a major irritant leading to the American Revolution.

Mercantilism taught that trade was a zero-sum game with one country's gain equivalent to a loss sustained by the trading partner. Whatever the theoretical weaknesses exposed by economists after Adam Smith, it was under mercantilist policies before the 1840s that Britain became the world's dominant trader, and the global hegemon. Mercantilism in Britain ended when Parliament repealed the Navigation Acts and Corn Laws by 1846.

Scholars agree that Britain gradually dropped mercantilism after 1815. Free trade, with no tariffs and few restrictions, was the prevailing doctrine from the 1840s to the 1930s.

=== Defending empire and "pseudo-empire" ===
John Darwin has explored the way historians have explained the large role of the Royal Navy and the much smaller role of the British Army in the history of the empire. For the 20th century, he explores what he calls a "pseudo-empire," oil producers in the Middle East. The strategic goal of protecting the Suez Canal was a high priority from the 1880s to 1956 and, by then, had expanded to the oil regions. Darwin argues that defence strategy posed issues of how to reconcile the needs of domestic politics with the preservation of a global Empire. Darwin argues that a main function of the British defence system, especially the Royal Navy, was defence of the overseas empire (in addition of course to defence of the homeland). The army, usually in co-operation with local forces, suppressed internal revolts, losing only the American War of Independence (1775–83). Armitage considers the following to be the British creed:

Protestantism, oceanic commerce and mastery of the seas provided bastions to protect the freedom of inhabitants of the British Empire. That freedom found its institutional expression in Parliament, the law, property, and rights, all of which were exported throughout the British Atlantic world. Such freedom also allowed the British, uniquely, to combine the classically incompatible ideals of liberty and empire.

Lizzie Collingham (2017) stresses the role of expanding the food supply in the building, financing and defending the trade aspect of empire-building.

=== Thirteen American Colonies and Revolution ===
The first British Empire centered on the 13 American Colonies, which attracted large numbers of settlers from across Britain. In the 1900s - 1930s period the "Imperial School," including Herbert L. Osgood, George Louis Beer, Charles M. Andrews and Lawrence Gipson took a favourable view of the benefits of empire, emphasizing its successful economic integration.

Regarding Columbia University historian Herbert L. Osgood (1855–1918), biographer Gwenda Morgan concludes:

Osgood brought a new sophistication to the study of colonial relations posing the question from an institutional perspective, of how the Atlantic was bridged. He was the first American historian to recognize the complexity of imperial structures, the experimental character of the empire, and the contradictions between theory and practice that gave rise, on both sides of the Atlantic, to inconsistencies and misunderstandings ... It was American factors rather than imperial influences that in his view shaped the development of the colonies. Osgood's work still has value for professional historians interested in the nature of the colonies' place in the early British Empire, and their internal political development.

Much of the historiography concerns the reasons the Americans revolted in the 1770s and successfully broke away. The "Patriots", an insulting term used by the British that was proudly adopted by the Americans, stressed the constitutional rights of Englishmen, especially "No taxation without representation." Historians since the 1960s have emphasized that the Patriot constitutional argument was made possible by the emergence of a sense of American nationalism that united all 13 colonies. In turn, that nationalism was Rooted in a Republican value system that demanded consent of the governed and opposed aristocratic control. In Britain itself, republicanism was a fringe view since it challenged the aristocratic control of the British political system. There were (almost) no aristocrats or nobles in the 13 colonies, and instead, the colonial political system was based on the winners of free elections, which were open to the majority of white men. In the analysis of the coming of the Revolution, historians in recent decades have mostly used one of three approaches.

The Atlantic history view places the American story in a broader context, including revolutions in France and Haiti. It tends to reintegrate the historiographies of the American Revolution and the British Empire.

The "new social history" approach looks at community social structure to find cleavages that were magnified into colonial cleavages.

The ideological approach that centres on republicanism in the United States. Republicanism dictated there would be no royalty, aristocracy or national church but allowed for continuation of the British common law, which American lawyers and jurists understood and approved and used in their everyday practice. Historians have examined how the rising American legal profession adapted British common law to incorporate republicanism by selective revision of legal customs and by introducing more choice for courts.

== First British Empire and Second British Empire ==
The concept of a first and second British Empire was developed by historians in the early 20th century, Timothy H. Parsons argued in 2014, "there were several British empires that ended at different times and for different reasons". He focused on the Second.

Ashley Jackson argued in 2013 that historians have even extended to a third and fourth empire:

The first British Empire was largely destroyed by the loss of the American colonies, followed by a 'swing to the east' and the foundation of a second British Empire based on commercial and territorial expansion in South Asia. The third British Empire was the construction of a 'white' dominion power bloc in the international system based on Britain's relations with its settler offshoots Australia, Canada, New Zealand, and South Africa ... The fourth British Empire, meanwhile, is used to denote Britain's rejuvenated imperial focus on Africa and South-East Asia following the Second World War and the independence in 1947–48 of Britain's South Asian dependencies, when the Empire became a vital crutch in Britain's economic recovery.

The first Empire was founded in the 17th century, and based on the migration of large numbers of settlers to the American colonies, as well as the development of the sugar plantation colonies in the West Indies. It ended with the British loss of the American War for Independence. The second Empire had already started to emerge. It was originally designed as a chain of trading ports and naval bases. However, it expanded inland into the control of large numbers of natives when the East India Company proved highly successful in taking control of most of India. India became the keystone of the Second Empire, along with colonies later developed across Africa. A few new settler colonies were also built up in Australia and New Zealand, and to a lesser extent in South Africa. Marshall in 1999 shows the consensus of scholars is clear, for since 1900 the concepts of the First British Empire have "held their ground in historians' usage without serious challenge." In 1988 Peter Marshall says that late-18th-century transformations:

constituted a fundamental reordering of the Empire which make it appropriate to talk about a first British Empire giving way to a second one ... Historians have long identified certain developments in the late eighteenth century that undermined the fundamentals of the old Empire and were to bring about a new one. These were the American Revolution and the industrial revolution.

Historians, however, debate whether 1783 was a sharp line of demarcation between First and Second, or whether there was an overlap (as argued by Vincent T. Harlow) or whether there was a "black hole between 1783 and the later birth of the Second Empire. Historian Denis Judd says the "black hole" is a fallacy and that there was continuity. Judd writes: It is commonplace to suppose that the successful revolt of the American colonies marked the end of the 'First British Empire'. But this is only a half-truth. In 1783 there was still a substantial Empire left." Marshall notes that the exact dating of the two empires varies, with 1783 a typical demarcation point. Thus the story of the American revolt provides a key: The Fall of the First British Empire: Origins of the Wars of American Independence (1982) by American professors Robert W. Tucker and David Hendrickson, stresses the victorious initiative of the Americans. By contrast Cambridge professor Brendan Simms explores Three Victories and a Defeat: The Rise and Fall of the First British Empire, 1714–1783 (2007) and explains Britain's defeat in terms of alienating the major powers on the Continent.

== Theories of imperialism ==
Theories about imperialism typically focus on the Second British Empire, with side glances elsewhere. The term "Imperialism" was originally introduced into English in its present sense in the 1870s by Liberal leader William Gladstone to ridicule the imperial policies of Prime Minister Benjamin Disraeli, which he denounced as aggressive and ostentatious and inspired by domestic motives. The term was shortly appropriated by supporters of "imperialism" such as Joseph Chamberlain. For some, imperialism designated a policy of idealism and philanthropy; others alleged that it was characterized by political self-interest, and a growing number associated it with capitalist greed.

John A. Hobson, a leading English Liberal, developed a highly influential economic exploitation model in Imperialism: A Study (1902) that expanded on his belief that free enterprise capitalism had a negative impact on the majority of the population. In Imperialism he argued that the financing of overseas empires drained money that was needed at home. It was invested abroad because lower wages paid the workers overseas made for higher profits and higher rates of return, compared to domestic wages. So although domestic wages remained higher, they did not grow nearly as fast as they might have otherwise. Exporting capital, he concluded, put a lid on the growth of domestic wages in the domestic standard of living. . By the 1970s, historians such as David K. Fieldhouse and Oren Hale could argue that the, "Hobsonian foundation has been almost completely demolished." The British experience failed to support it. However, European Socialists picked up Hobson's ideas and made it into their own theory of imperialism, most notably in Lenin's Imperialism, the Highest Stage of Capitalism (1916). Lenin portrayed Imperialism as the closure of the world market and the end of capitalist free-competition that arose from the need for capitalist economies to constantly expand investment, material resources and manpower in such a way that necessitated colonial expansion. Later Marxist theoreticians echo this conception of imperialism as a structural feature of capitalism, which explained the World War as the battle between imperialists for control of external markets. Lenin's treatise became a standard textbook that flourished until the collapse of communism in 1989–91.

As the application of the term "imperialism" has expanded, its meaning has shifted along five axes: the moral, the economic, the systemic, the cultural, and the temporal. Those changes reflect a growing unease, even squeamishness, with the fact of power, specifically, Western power.

The relationships among capitalism, imperialism, exploitation, social reform and economic development has long been debated among historians and political theorists. Much of the debate was pioneered by such theorists as John A. Hobson (1858–1940), Joseph Schumpeter (1883–1950), Thorstein Veblen (1857–1929), and Norman Angell (1872–1967). While these non-Marxist writers were at their most prolific before World War I, they remained active in the interwar years. Their combined work informed the study of imperialism's impact on Europe, as well as contributed to reflections on the rise of the military-political complex in the United States from the 1950s. Hobson argued that domestic social reforms could cure the international disease of imperialism by removing its economic foundation. Hobson theorized that state intervention through taxation could boost broader consumption, create wealth, and encourage a peaceful multilateral world order. Conversely, should the state not intervene, rentiers (people who earn income from property or securities) would generate socially negative wealth that fostered imperialism and protectionism.

Hobson for years was widely influential in liberal circles, especially the British Liberal Party. Lenin's writings became orthodoxy for all Marxist historians. They had many critics. D. K. Fieldhouse, for example, argues that they used superficial arguments. Fieldhouse says that the "obvious driving force of British expansion since 1870" came from explorers, missionaries, engineers, and empire-minded politicians. They had little interest in financial investments. Hobson's answer was to say that faceless financiers manipulated everyone else, so that "The final determination rests with the financial power." Lenin believed that capitalism was in its last stages and had been taken over by monopolists. They were no longer dynamic and sought to maintain profits by even more intensive exploitation of protected markets. Fieldhouse rejects these arguments as unfounded speculation.

=== Imperialism of Free Trade ===
Historians agree that in the 1840s, Britain adopted a free-trade policy, meaning open markets and no tariffs throughout the empire. The debate among historians involves what the implications of free trade actually were. "The Imperialism of Free Trade" is a highly influential 1952 article by John Gallagher and Ronald Robinson. They argued that the New Imperialism of the 1880s", especially the Scramble for Africa, was a continuation of a long-term policy in which informal empire, based on the principles of free trade, was favoured over formal imperial control. The article helped launch the Cambridge School of historiography. Gallagher and Robinson used the British experience to construct a framework for understanding European imperialism that swept away the all-or-nothing thinking of previous historians. They found that European leaders rejected the notion that "imperialism" had to be based upon formal, legal control by one government over a colonial region. Much more important was informal influence in independent areas. According to Wm. Roger Louis, "In their view, historians have been mesmerized by formal empire and maps of the world with regions colored red. The bulk of British emigration, trade, and capital went to areas outside the formal British Empire. Key to their thinking is the idea of empire 'informally if possible and formally if necessary.'" Oron Hale says that Gallagher and Robinson looked at the British involvement in Africa where they, "found few capitalists, less capital, and not much pressure from the alleged traditional promoters of colonial expansion. Cabinet decisions to annex or not to annex were made, usually on the basis of political or geopolitical considerations."

Reviewing the debate from the end of the 20th century, historian Martin Lynn argues that Gallagher and Robinson exaggerated the impact. He says that Britain achieved its goal of increasing its economic interests in many areas, "but the broader goal of 'regenerating' societies and thereby creating regions tied as 'tributaries' to British economic interests was not attained." The reasons were:

the aim to reshape the world through free trade and its extension overseas owed more to the misplaced optimism of British policy-makers and their partial views of the world than to an understanding of the realities of the mid-19th century globe ... the volumes of trade and investment...the British were able to generate remained limited ... Local economies and local regimes proved adept at restricting the reach of British trade and investment. Local impediments to foreign inroads, the inhabitants' low purchasing power, the resilience of local manufacturing, and the capabilities of local entrepreneurs meant that these areas effectively resisted British economic penetration.

The idea that free-trade imperial states use informal controls to secure their expanding economic influence has attracted Marxists trying to avoid the problems of earlier Marxist interpretations of capitalism. The approach is most often applied to American policies.

=== Free trade versus tariffs ===
Historians have begun to explore some of the ramifications of British free-trade policy, especially the effect of American and German high tariff policies. Canada adopted a "national policy" of high tariffs in the late 19th century, in sharp distinction to the mother country. The goal was to protect its infant manufacturing industries from low-cost imports from the United States and Britain. The demand increasingly rose in Great Britain to end the free trade policy and impose tariffs to protect its manufacturing from American and German competition. The leading spokesman was Joseph Chamberlain (1836-1914) and he made "tariff reform" (that is, imposing higher tariffs) a central issue in British domestic politics. By the 1930s the British began shifting their policies away from free trade and toward low tariffs inside the British Commonwealth, and higher tariffs for outside products. Economic historians have debated at length the impact of these tariff changes on economic growth. One controversial formulation by Bairoch argues that in the 1870–1914 era: "protectionism = economic growth and expansion of trade; liberalism = stagnation in both". Many studies have supported Bairoch but other economists have challenged his results regarding Canada.

=== Gentlemanly capitalism ===
Gentlemanly capitalism is a theory of New Imperialism first put forward by P. J. Cain and A. G. Hopkins in the 1980s before being fully developed in their 1993 work, British Imperialism. The theory posits that British imperialism was driven by the business interests of the City of London and landed interests. It encourages a shift of emphasis away from seeing provincial manufacturers and geopolitical strategy as important influences, and towards seeing the expansion of empire as emanating from London and the financial sector.

== Benevolence, human rights and slavery ==
Kevin Grant shows that numerous historians in the 21st century have explored relationships between the Empire, international government and human rights. They have focused on British conceptions of imperial world order from the late 19th century to the Cold War. The British intellectuals and political leaders felt that they had a duty to protect and promote the human rights of the natives and to help pull them from the slough of traditionalism and cruelties (such as suttee in India and foot binding in China). The notion of "benevolence" was developed in the 1780–1840 era by idealists whose moralistic prescriptions annoyed efficiency-oriented colonial administrators and profit-oriented merchants. Partly it was a matter of fighting corruption in the Empire, as typified by Edmund Burke's long, but failed, attempt to impeach Warren Hastings for his cruelties in India. The most successful development came in the abolition of slavery led by William Wilberforce and the Evangelicals, and the expansion of Christian missionary work. Edward Gibbon Wakefield (1796–1852) spearheaded efforts to create model colonies (such as South Australia, Canada and New Zealand). The 1840 Treaty of Waitangi, initially designed to protect Maori rights, has become the bedrock of Aotearoa–New Zealand biculturalism. In Wakefield's vision, the object of benevolence was to introduce and promote values of industriousness and a productive economy, not to use colonies as a dumping ground for transported criminals.

=== Promotion and abolition of slavery ===
English historian Jeremy Black argues that:

Slavery and the slave trade are the most difficult and contentious aspect of the imperial legacy, one that captures the full viciousness of power, economic, political, and military, and that leaves a clear and understandable hostility to empire in the Atlantic world, Moreover, within Britain, slavery and the slave trade became and become, ready ways to stigmatize empire, and increasingly so, notably as Britain becomes a multiracial society.

One of the most controversial aspects of the Empire is its role in first promoting and then ending slavery. In the 18th century, British merchant ships were the largest element in the "Middle Passage", which transported millions of slaves to the Western Hemisphere. Most of those who survived the journey wound up in the Caribbean, where the Empire had highly profitable sugar colonies, and the living conditions were bad (the plantation owners lived in Britain). Parliament ended the international transportation of slaves in 1807 and used the Royal Navy to enforce that ban. In 1833, it bought out the plantation owners and banned slavery. Historians before the 1940s argued that moralistic reformers such as William Wilberforce were primarily responsible.

Historical revisionism arrived when West Indian historian Eric Williams, a Marxist, in Capitalism and Slavery (1944), rejected this moral explanation and argued that abolition was now more profitable, as a century of sugar cane raising had exhausted the soil of the islands, and the plantations had become unprofitable. It was more profitable to sell the slaves to the government than to keep up operations. The 1807 prohibition of the international trade, Williams argued, prevented French expansion on other islands. Meanwhile, British investors turned to Asia, where labor was so plentiful that slavery was unnecessary. Williams went on to argue that slavery played a major role in making Britain prosperous. The high profits from the slave trade, he said, helped finance the Industrial Revolution. Britain enjoyed prosperity because of the capital gained from the unpaid work of slaves.

Since the 1970s, numerous historians have challenged Williams from various angles, and Gad Heuman has concluded, "More recent research has rejected this conclusion; it is now clear that the colonies of the British Caribbean profited considerably during the Revolutionary and Napoleonic Wars." In his major attack on the Williams's thesis, Seymour Drescher argues that Britain's abolition of the slave trade in 1807 resulted not from the diminishing value of slavery for Britain but instead from the moral outrage of the British voting public. Critics have also argued that slavery remained profitable in the 1830s because of innovations in agriculture so the profit motive was not central to abolition. Richardson (1998) finds that Williams's claims regarding the Industrial Revolution are exaggerated, as profits from the slave trade amounted to less than 1% of domestic investment in Britain. Richardson further challenges claims (by African scholars) that the slave trade caused widespread depopulation and economic distress in Africa but that it caused the "underdevelopment" of Africa. Admitting the horrible suffering of slaves, he notes that many Africans benefited directly because the first stage of the trade was always firmly in the hands of Africans. European slave ships waited at ports to purchase cargoes of people who were captured in the hinterland by African dealers and tribal leaders. Richardson finds that the "terms of trade" (how much the ship owners paid for the slave cargo) moved heavily in favour of the Africans after about 1750. That is, indigenous elites inside West and Central Africa made large and growing profits from slavery, thus increasing their wealth and power.

Economic historian Stanley Engerman finds that even without subtracting the associated costs of the slave trade (shipping costs, slave mortality, mortality of British people in Africa, defence costs) or reinvestment of profits back into the slave trade, the total profits from the slave trade and of West Indian plantations amounted to less than 5% of the British economy during any year of the Industrial Revolution. Engerman's 5% figure gives as much as possible in terms of benefit of the doubt to the Williams argument, not solely because it does not take into account the associated costs of the slave trade to Britain, but also because it carries the full-employment assumption from economics and holds the gross value of slave trade profits as a direct contribution to Britain's national income. Historian Richard Pares, in an article written before Williams's book, dismisses the influence of wealth generated from the West Indian plantations upon the financing of the Industrial Revolution, stating that whatever substantial flow of investment from West Indian profits into industry there was occurred after emancipation, not before it.

=== Whiggish history and the civilising mission ===
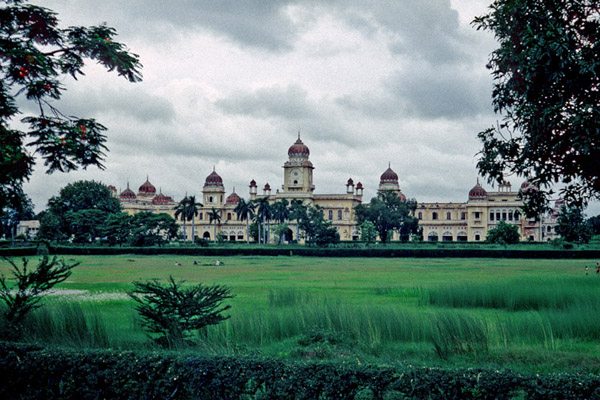
University of Lucknow founded by the British in 1867 in India

Thomas Babington Macaulay (1800–1859) was the foremost historian of his day, arguing for the "Whig interpretation of history" that saw the history of Britain as an upward progression always leading to more liberty and more progress. Macaulay simultaneously was a leading reformer involved in transforming the educational system of India. He would base it on the English language so that India could join the mother country in a steady upward progress. Macaulay took Burke's emphasis on moral rule and implemented it in actual school reforms, giving the British Empire a profound moral mission to civilize the natives.

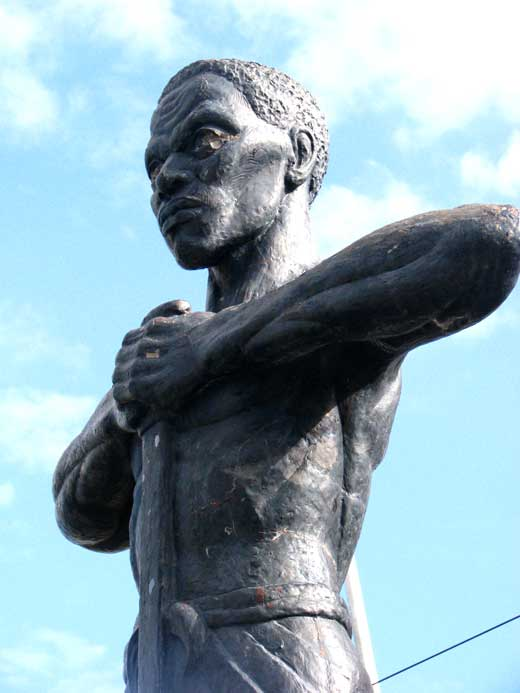
Paul Bogle, a Baptist deacon, was hanged for leading the Morant Bay rebellion in Jamaica, 1865

Yale professor Karuna Mantena has argued that the civilizing mission did not last long, for she says that benevolent reformers were the losers in key debates, such as those following the 1857 rebellion in India, and the scandal of Governor Edward Eyre's brutal repression of the Morant Bay rebellion in Jamaica in 1865. The rhetoric continued but it became an alibi for British misrule and racism. No longer was it believed that the natives could truly make progress, instead they had to be ruled by heavy hand, with democratic opportunities postponed indefinitely. As a result:

The central tenets of liberal imperialism were challenged as various forms of rebellion, resistance and instability in the colonies precipitated a broad-ranging reassessment ... the equation of 'good government' with the reform of native society, which was at the core of the discourse of liberal empire, would be subject to mounting skepticism."

English historian Peter Cain, has challenged Mantena, arguing that the imperialists truly believed that British rule would bring to the subjects the benefits of 'ordered liberty'. thereby Britain could fulfill its moral duty and achieve its own greatness. Much of the debate took place in Britain itself, and the imperialists worked hard to convince the general population that the civilising mission was well underway. This campaign served to strengthen imperial support at home, and thus, says Cain, to bolster the moral authority of the gentlemanly elites who ran the Empire.

=== Public health ===
Mark Harrison argues that the history of public health administration in India dates from the assumption of Crown rule in 1859. Medical experts found that epidemic disease had seriously depleted the fighting capacity of British troops in repressing the rebellion in 1857 and insisted that preventive measures were much more effective than waiting for the next epidemic to break out. Across the Empire it became a high priority for Imperial officials to establish a public health system in each colony. They applied the best practices as developed in Britain, using an elaborate administrative structure in each colony. The system depended on trained local elites and officials to carry out the sanitation improvements, quarantines, inoculations, hospitals, and local treatment centers that were needed. For example, local midwives were trained to provide maternal and infant health care. Propaganda campaigns using posters, rallies, and later films were used to educate the general public. A serious challenge came from the intensified use of multiple transportation routes and the emergence of central hubs such as Hong Kong all of which facilitated this spread of epidemics such as the plague in the 1890s, thus sharply increasing the priority of public health programs. Michael Worboys argues that the 20th-century development and control of tropical diseases had three phases: protection of Europeans in the colonies, improvement in health care of employable natives, and finally the systematic attack on the main diseases of the natives. BELRA, a large-scale program against leprosy, had policies of isolation in newly established leper colonies, separation of healthy children from infected parents, and the development in Britain of chaulmoogra oil therapy and its systematic dissemination.

Danald McDonald has argued the most advanced program in public health (apart from the dominions) was established in India, with the Indian Medical Service (IMS). The Raj set up the Calcutta School of Tropical Medicine between 1910 and its opening in 1921 as a postgraduate center for tropical medicine on the periphery of the Empire.

=== Religion: The missionaries ===
In the 18th century, and even more so in the 19th century, missionaries based in Britain saw the Empire as a fertile field for proselytizing Christianity. Congregations across Britain received regular reports and contributed money. All the main denominations were involved, including the Church of England, the Presbyterians of Scotland, and the Nonconformists. Much of the enthusiasm emerged from the Evangelical revival. The two largest and most influential operations were the Society for the Propagation of the Gospel in Foreign Parts (SPG) founded in 1701, and the more evangelical Church Mission Society, founded in 1799, also by the Church of England.

Before the American Revolution, Anglican and Methodist missionaries were active in the 13 Colonies. The Methodists, led by George Whitefield, were the most successful according to Mark Noll. After the revolution an entirely distinct American Methodist denomination emerged that became the largest Protestant denomination in the new United States. As historians such as Carl Bridenbaugh have argued, a major problem for colonial officials was the demand of the Church of England to set up an American bishop; this was strongly opposed by most of the Americans. Increasingly colonial officials took a neutral position on religious matters, even in those colonies such as Virginia where the Church of England was officially established, but in practice controlled by laymen in the local vestries. After the Americans broke free, British officials decided to enhance the power and wealth of the Church of England in all the settler colonies, especially British North America (Canada).

Missionary societies funded their own operations that were not supervised or directed by the Colonial Office. Tensions emerged between the missionaries and the colonial officials. The latter feared that missionaries might stir up trouble or encourage the natives to challenge colonial authority. In general, colonial officials were much more comfortable with working with the established local leadership, including the native religions, rather than introducing the divisive force of Christianity. This proved especially troublesome in India, where very few local elites were attracted to Christianity. In Africa, especially, the missionaries made many converts. By the 21st century, there were more Anglicans in Nigeria than in England.

Christianity had a powerful effect far beyond the small circle of converts—it provided a model of modernity. The introduction of European medicine was especially important, as well as the introduction of European political practices and ideals such as religious liberty, mass education, mass printing, newspapers, voluntary organizations, colonial reforms, and especially liberal democracy. Increasingly the missionaries realized their wider scope and systematically added secular roles to their spiritual mission. They tried to upgrade education, medical care, and sponsored the long-term modernization of the native personality to inculcate European middle-class values. Alongside their churches they established schools and medical clinics, and sometimes demonstrated improved farming techniques. Christian missionaries played a public role, especially in promoting sanitation and public health. Many were trained as physicians, or took special courses in public health and tropical medicine at Livingstone College, London.

Furthermore, Christian missionary activities were studied and copied by local activists and had an influence upon religious politics, on prophetic movements such as those in Xhosa societies, on emerging nationalism in South African and India, the emergence of African independent churches, and sometimes upgrading the status of native women.

Historians have begun to analyze the agency of women in overseas missions. At first, missionary societies officially enrolled only men, but women increasingly insisted on playing a variety of roles. Single women typically worked as educators. Wives assisted their missionary husbands in most of his roles. Advocates stopped short of calling for the end of specified gender roles, but they stressed the interconnectedness of the public and private spheres and spoke out against perceptions of women as weak and house-bound.

=== Education ===
In the colonies that became dominions, education was left primarily in the hands of local officials. The Imperial government took a strong hand in India, and most of the later colonies. The goal was to speed up modernization and social development through a widespread system of elementary education for all natives, plus high school and eventually university education for selected elites. The students were encouraged to attend university in Britain.

=== Direct control and bureaucracy ===
Much of the older historiography, as represented by The Cambridge History of the British Empire, covers the detailed month-to-month operations of the Imperial bureaucracy. More recent scholarship has examined who the bureaucrats and governors were, as well as the role of the colonial experience on their own lives and families. The cultural approach asks how bureaucrats represented themselves and enticed the natives to accept their rule.

Wives of senior bureaucrats played an increasingly important role in dealing with the local people, and in sponsoring and promoting charities and civic good will. When they returned to Britain they had an influential voice in shaping upper-class opinion toward colonization. Historian Robert Pearce points out that many colonial wives had a negative reputation, but he depicts Violet Bourdillon (1886–1979) as "the perfect Governor's wife." She charmed both British businessmen and the locals in Nigeria, giving the colonial peoples graciousness and respect; she made the British appear to be not so much rulers, as guides and partners in social, economic and political development.

=== Indirect control ===
Some British colonies were ruled directly by the Colonial Office in London, while others were ruled indirectly through local rulers who are supervised behind the scenes by British advisors, with different economic results as shown by Lakshmi Iyer (2010).

In much of the Empire, large local populations were ruled in close cooperation with the local hierarchy. Historians have developed categories of control, such as "subsidiary alliances", "paramountcy", "protectorates", "indirect rule", "clientelism", or "collaboration". Local elites were co-opted into leadership positions, and often had the role of minimizing opposition from local independence movements.

Fisher has explored the origins and development of the system of indirect rule. The British East India Company starting in the mid-18th century stationed its staff as agents in Indian states which it did not control, especially the Princely States. By the 1840s The system became an efficient way to govern indirectly, by providing local rulers with highly detailed advice that had been approved by central authorities. After 1870, military more and more often took the role; they were recruited and promoted officers on the basis of experience and expertise. The indirect rule system was extended to Many of the colonial holdings in Asia and Africa.

Economic historians have explored the economic consequences of indirect rule, as in India and West Africa.

In 1890, Zanzibar became a protectorate (not a colony) of Britain. Prime minister Salisbury explained his position:

The condition of a protected dependency is more acceptable to the half civilised races, and more suitable for them than direct dominion. It is cheaper, simpler, less wounding to their self-esteem, gives them more career as public officials, and spares of unnecessary contact with white men.

Colonel Sir Robert Groves Sandeman (1835–1892) introduced an innovative system of tribal pacification in Balochistan that was in effect from 1877 to 1947. He gave financial allowances to tribal chiefs who enforced control, and used British military force only when necessary. However the Government of India generally opposed his methods and refused to allow it to operate in India's North West Frontier. Historians have long debated its scope and effectiveness in the peaceful spread of Imperial influence.

=== Environment ===
Although environmental history was growing rapidly after 1970, it only reached empire studies in the 1990s. Gregory Barton argues that the concept of environmentalism emerged from forestry studies, and emphasizes the British imperial role in that research. He argues that imperial forestry movement in India around 1900 included government reservations, new methods of fire protection, and attention to revenue-producing forest management. The result eased the fight between romantic preservationists and laissez-faire businessmen, thus giving the compromise from which modern environmentalism emerged.

In recent years numerous scholars cited by James Beattie have examined the environmental impact of the Empire. Beinart and Hughes argue that the discovery and commercial or scientific use of new plants was an important concern in the 18th and 19th centuries. The efficient use of rivers through dams and irrigation projects was an expensive but important method of raising agricultural productivity. Searching for more efficient ways of using natural resources, the British moved flora, fauna and commodities around the world, sometimes resulting in ecological disruption and radical environmental change. Imperialism also stimulated more modern attitudes toward nature and subsidized botany and agricultural research. Scholars have used the British Empire to examine the utility of the new concept of eco-cultural networks as a lens for examining interconnected, wide-ranging social and environmental processes.

== Regions ==
Between 1696 and 1782, the Board of Trade, in partnership with the various secretaries of state over that time, (Note: Secretary of State (England) (to 1660), Secretary of State for the Southern Department (1660-1768), Secretary of State for the Colonies (1768-1782)) held responsibility for colonial affairs, particularly in British America.

From 1783 through 1801, the British Empire, including British North America, was administered by the Home Office and by the Home Secretary, then from 1801 to 1854 by the War Office (which became the War and Colonial Office) and Secretary of State for War and Colonies (as the Secretary of State for War was renamed). From 1824, the British Empire was divided by the War and Colonial Office into four administrative departments, including NORTH AMERICA, the WEST INDIES, MEDITERRANEAN AND AFRICA, and EASTERN COLONIES, of which North America included:

NORTH AMERICA

- Upper Canada, Lower Canada
- New Brunswick, Nova Scotia, Prince Edward Island
- Bermuda, Newfoundland

The Colonial Office and War Office, and the Secretary of State for the Colonies and the Secretary of State for War, were separated in 1854. The War Office, from then until the 1867 confederation of the Dominion of Canada, split the military administration of the British colonial and foreign stations into nine districts: North America And North Atlantic; West Indies; Mediterranean; West Coast Of Africa And South Atlantic; South Africa; Egypt And The Sudan; INDIAN OCEAN; Australia; and China. North America And North Atlantic included the following stations (or garrisons):

NORTH AMERICA AND NORTH ATLANTIC

- New Westminster (British Columbia)
- Newfoundland
- Quebec
- Halifax
- Kingston, Canada West
- Bermuda

India was administered separately by the East India Company until transferred by the Government of India Act 1858 to the India Office, which was closed in 1947 on Indian independence. As British protectorates were not British territory, they were also administered separately by the Foreign Office.

The Colonial Office, by 1862, oversaw eight Colonies in British North America, including:

North American Colonies, 1862

- Canada
- Nova Scotia
- New Brunswick
- Prince Edward Island
- Newfoundland
- Bermuda
- Vancouver Island
- British Columbia

By 1867, administration of the South Atlantic Ocean archipelago of the Falkland Islands, which had been colonised in 1833, had been added to the remit of the North American Department of the Colonial Office.

North American Department of the Colonial Office, 1867

- Canada
- Nova Scotia
- New Brunswick
- Prince Edward Island
- Newfoundland
- Bermuda
- Vancouver Island
- British Columbia
- Falkland Islands

Following the 1867 confederation of most of the British North American colonies to form the Dominion of Canada, Bermuda and Newfoundland remained as the only British colonies in North America (although the Falkland Islands also continued to be administered by the North American Department of the Colonial Office). Although the British Government was no longer responsible for Canada, its relationship with Canada and subsequent dominions would continue to be overseen by the Secretary of State for the Colonies (who headed the Colonial Office) until the creation of the Secretary of State for Dominion Affairs (a position initially held in common with the Secretary of State for the Colonies) in 1925. The reduction of the territory administered by the British Government would result in re-organisation of the Colonial Office. In 1901, the departments of the Colonial Office included: North American and Australasian; West Indian; Eastern; South African; and West African (two departments).

Of these, the "North American and Australasian Department" included:

North American and Australasian Department, 1901

- Canada
- Newfoundland
- Bermuda
- Bahamas
- British Honduras
- New South Wales
- Victoria
- South Australia
- Queensland
- Western Australia
- Tasmania, New Zealand
- Fiji
- British New Guinea
- Western Pacific
- Cyprus
- Gibraltar
- Falkland Islands.

In 1907, the Colony of Newfoundland became the Dominion of Newfoundland, leaving the Imperial fortress of Bermuda as the sole remaining British North American colony.

Bermuda, with a land mass totalling less than 21 square miles and a population of 17,535, could hardly constitute an Imperial administrative region on its own. By 1908, the Colonial Office included two departments (one overseeing dominion and protectorate business, the other colonial): Dominions Department (Canada, Australia, New Zealand, Cape of Good Hope, Natal, Newfoundland, Transvaal, Orange River Colony, Australian States, Fiji, Western Pacific, Basutoland, Bechuanaland Protectorate, Swaziland, Rhodesia); Crown Colonies Department. The Crown Colonies Department was made up of four territorial divisions: Eastern Division; West Indian Division; East African and Mediterranean Division; and the West African Division.

Of these, the West Indian Division now included all of the remaining British colonies in the Western Hemisphere, from Bermuda to the Falkland Islands:

Jamaica, Turks Islands, British Honduras, British Guiana, Bahamas, Bermuda, Trinidad, Barbados, Windward Islands, Leeward Islands, Falkland Islands, and St. Helena.

=== Surveys of the whole empire ===
In 1914, the six-volume The Oxford Survey Of The British Empire gave comprehensive coverage to geography and society of the entire Empire, including the British Isles.

Since the 1950s, historians have tended to concentrate on specific countries or regions. By the 1930s, an Empire so vast was a challenge for historians to grasp in its entirety. The American Lawrence H. Gipson (1880–1971) won the Pulitzer Prize for his monumental coverage in 15 volumes of "The British Empire Before the American Revolution", published 1936–70. At about the same time in London, Sir Keith Hancock wrote a Survey of Commonwealth Affairs (2 vol 1937–42) that dramatically widened the scope of coverage beyond politics to the newer fields of economic and social history.

In recent decades numerous scholars have tried their hand at one volume surveys including T. O. Lloyd, The British Empire, 1558–1995 (1996); Denis Judd, Empire: The British Imperial Experience From 1765 To The Present (1998); Lawrence James, The Rise and Fall of the British Empire (1998); Niall Ferguson, Empire: The Rise and Demise of the British World Order and the Lessons for Global Power (2002); Brendan Simms, Three victories and a defeat: the rise and fall of the first British Empire (2008); Piers Brendon, The Decline and Fall of the British Empire, 1781–1997 (2008), and Phillip J. Smith, The Rise And Fall Of The British Empire: Mercantilism, Diplomacy and the Colonies (2015). There were also large-scale popular histories, such as those by Winston Churchill, A History of the English-Speaking Peoples (4 vol. 1956–58) and Arthur Bryant, The History of Britain and the British Peoples (3 vols. 1984–90). Obviously from their titles a number of writers have been inspired by the famous The History of the Decline and Fall of the Roman Empire (6 vols 1776–1781) by Edward Gibbon. Brendon notes that Gibbon's work, "became the essential guide for Britons anxious to plot their own imperial trajectory. They found the key to understanding the British Empire in the ruins of Rome." W. David McIntyre, The commonwealth of nations: Origins and impact, 1869–1971 (University of Minnesota Press, 1977) provides comprehensive coverage giving London's perspective on political and constitutional relations with each possession.

=== Ireland ===
Ireland, in some ways the first acquisition the British Empire, has generated a very large popular and scholarly literature. Marshall says historians continue to debate whether Ireland should be considered part of the British Empire. Recent work by historians pays special attention to continuing Imperial aspects of Irish history, postcolonial approaches, Atlantic history, and the role of migration in forming the Irish diaspora across the Empire and North America.

=== Australia ===
Until the late 20th century, historians of Australia used an Imperial framework, arguing that Australia emerged from a transfer of people, institutions, and culture from Britain. It portrayed the first governors as "Lilliputian sovereigns". The historians have traced the arrival of limited self-government, with regional parliaments and responsible ministers, followed by Federation in 1901 and eventually full national autonomy. This was a Whiggish story of successful growth into a modern nation. That interpretation has been largely abandoned by recent scholars. In his survey of the historiography of Australia, Stuart Macintyre shows how historians have emphasized the negative and tragic features between the boasts. Macintyre points out that in current historical writing:

The process of settlement is now regarded as a violent invasion of a rich and subtle indigenous culture, the colonists' material practices as destructive of a fragile environment, their aesthetic response to it blinkered and prejudiced, the cultivation of some British forms timid and unresponsive.

The first major history was William Charles Wentworth, Statistical, Historical, and Political Description of the Colony of New South Wales, and Its Dependent Settlements in Van Diemen's Land: With a Particular Enumeration of the Advantages Which These Colonies Offer for Emigration, and Their Superiority in Many Respects Over Those Possessed by the United States of America (1819). Wentworth shows the disastrous effects of the penal regime. Many other historians followed his path, with the six volume History of Australia by Manning Clark (published 1962–87) telling the story of "epic tragedy":

in which the explorers, Governors, improvers, and perturbators vainly endeavored to impose their received schemes of redemption on an alien, intractable setting.

==== History wars ====
Since the 1980s some even describe a "history war" taking place in Australia involving scholars and politicians. Debate often concerns recorded history verses oral testimony - unproven in Courts of Law - regarding the treatment of Aboriginal populations. They debate how "British" or "multicultural" Australia has been historically, and how it should be today. The rhetoric has escalated into national politics, often tied to the question of whether the royalty should be discarded and Australia become a republic. Some schools and universities have reduced the amount of Australian history in their curriculum.

==== Debates on the founding ====
Historians have used the founding of Australia to mark the beginning of the Second British Empire. It was planned by the government in London and designed as a replacement for the lost American colonies. The American Loyalist James Matra in 1783 wrote "A Proposal for Establishing a Settlement in New South Wales" proposing the establishment of a colony composed of American Loyalists, Chinese and South Sea Islanders (but not convicts). Matra reasoned that the land country was suitable for plantations of sugar, cotton and tobacco; New Zealand timber and hemp or flax could prove valuable commodities; it could form a base for Pacific trade; and it could be a suitable compensation for displaced American Loyalists. At the suggestion of Secretary of State Lord Sydney, Matra amended his proposal to include convicts as settlers, considering that this would benefit both "Economy to the Publick, & Humanity to the Individual". The government adopted the basics of Matra's plan in 1784, and funded the settlement of convicts.

Michael Roe argues that the founding of Australia supports the theory of Vincent T. Harlow in The Founding of the Second British Empire, 17G3-1793, Vol. 2. New Continents and Changing Values (1964) that a goal of the second British empire was to open up new commerce in the Far East and Pacific. However, London emphasized Australia's purpose as a penal colony, and the East India Company was hostile to potential commercial rivals. Nevertheless, says Roe, the founders of Australia showed a keen interest in whaling, sealing, sheep raising, mining and other opportunities for trade. In the long run, he says, commerce was the main stimulus for colonization.

=== Canada ===
Canadian historian Carl Berger argues that an influential section of English Canadians embraced an ideology of imperialism as a way to enhance Canada's own power position in the international system, as well as for more traditional reasons of Anglophillia. Berger identified Canadian imperialism as a distinct ideology, rival to anti-imperial Canadian nationalism or pro-American continentalism, the other nationalisms in Canada.

For the French Canadians, the chief debate among historians involves the conquest and the incorporation into the British Empire in 1763. One school says it was a disaster that retarded for a century and more the normal development of a middle class society, leaving Quebec locked into a traditionalism controlled by priests and landlords. The other more optimistic school says it was generally advantageous in political and economic terms. For example, it enabled Quebec to avoid the French Revolution that tore France apart in the 1790s. Another example is that it integrated the economy into the larger and faster growing British economy, as opposed to the sluggish French economy. The optimistic school attributes the backwardness of the Quebec economy to deeply ingrained conservatism and aversion to entrepreneurship.

=== India ===
In recent decades there have been four main schools of historiography in how historians study India: Cambridge, Nationalist, Marxist, and subaltern. The once common "Orientalist" approach, with its image of a sensuous, inscrutable, and wholly spiritual India, has died out in serious scholarship.

The "Cambridge School", led by Anil Seal, Gordon Johnson, Richard Gordon, and David A. Washbrook, downplays ideology. However, this school of historiography is criticised for western bias or Eurocentrism.

The Nationalist school has focused on Congress, Gandhi, Nehru and high level politics. It highlighted the Mutiny of 1857 as a war of liberation, and Gandhi's 'Quit India' begun in 1942, as defining historical events. This school of historiography has received criticism for Elitism.

The Marxists have focused on studies of economic development, landownership, and class conflict in precolonial India and of deindustrialisation during the colonial period. The Marxists portrayed Gandhi's movement as a device of the bourgeois elite to harness popular, potentially revolutionary forces for its own ends. Again, the Marxists are accused of being "too much" ideologically influenced.

The "subaltern school", was begun in the 1980s by Ranajit Guha and Gyan Prakash. It focuses attention away from the elites and politicians to "history from below", looking at the peasants using folklore, poetry, riddles, proverbs, songs, oral history and methods inspired by anthropology. It focuses on the colonial era before 1947 and typically emphasises caste and downplays class, to the annoyance of the Marxist school.

More recently, Hindu nationalists have created a version of history to support their demands for "Hindutva" ("Hinduness") in Indian society. This school of thought is still in the process of development. In March 2012, Diana L. Eck in her India: A Sacred Geography (2013) argues that the idea of India dates to a much earlier time than the British or the Mughals and it was not just a cluster of regional identities and it wasn't ethnic or racial.

Debate continues about the economic impact of British imperialism on India. The issue was actually raised by conservative British politician Edmund Burke who in the 1780s vehemently attacked the East India Company, claiming that Warren Hastings and other top officials had ruined the Indian economy and society. Indian historian Rajat Kanta Ray (1998) continues this line of attack, saying the new economy brought by the British in the 18th century was a form of "plunder" and a catastrophe for the traditional economy of Mughal India. Ray accuses the British of depleting the food and money stocks and imposing high taxes that helped cause the terrible famine of 1770, which killed a third of the people of Bengal.

Rejecting the Indian nationalist account of the British as alien aggressors, seizing power by brute force and impoverishing all of India, British historian P. J. Marshall argues that the British were not in full control but instead were players in what was primarily an Indian play and in which their rise to power depended upon excellent cooperation with Indian elites. Marshall admits that much of his interpretation is still rejected by many historians. Marshall argues that recent scholarship has reinterpreted the view that the prosperity of the formerly benign Mughal rule gave way to poverty and anarchy. Marshall argues the British takeover did not make any sharp break with the past. The British largely delegated control to regional Mughal rulers and sustained a generally prosperous economy for the rest of the 18th century. Marshall notes the British went into partnership with Indian bankers and raised revenue through local tax administrators and kept the old Mughal rates of taxation. Professor Ray agrees that the East India Company inherited an onerous taxation system that took one-third of the produce of Indian cultivators.

In the 20th century historians generally agreed that imperial authority in the Raj had been secure in the 1800-1940 era. Various challenges have emerged. Mark Condos and Jon Wilson argue that the Raj was chronically insecure. They argue that the irrational anxiety of officials led to a chaotic administration with minimal social purchase or ideological coherence. The Raj was not a confident state capable of acting as it chose, but rather a psychologically embattled one incapable of acting except in the abstract, the small scale, or short term.

=== Tropical Africa ===
The first historical studies appeared in the 1890s, and followed one of four approaches. The territorial narrative was typically written by a veteran soldier or civil servant who gave heavy emphasis to what he had seen. The "apologia" were essays designed to justify British policies. Thirdly, popularizers tried to reach a large audience, and finally compendia appeared designed to combine academic and official credentials. Professional scholarship appeared around 1900, and began with the study of business operations, typically using government documents and unpublished archives. The economic approach was widely practiced in the 1930s, primarily to provide descriptions of the changes underway in the previous half-century. Reginald Coupland, an Oxford professor, studied the Exploitation of East Africa, 1856–1890: The Slave Trade and the Scramble (1939). The American historian William L. Langer wrote The Diplomacy of Imperialism: 1890–1902 (1935), a book is still widely cited. The Second World War diverted most scholars to wartime projects and accounted for a pause in scholarship during the 1940s.

By the 1950s, many African students were studying in British universities, and they produced a demand for new scholarship, and started themselves to supply it as well. Oxford University became the main center for African studies, with activity as well at Cambridge, and the London School of Economics. The perspective from British government policy-makers or from international business operations, slowly gave way to a new interest in the activities of the natives, especially in a nationalistic movements and the growing demand for independence. The major breakthrough came from Ronald Robinson and John Gallagher, especially with their studies of the impact of free trade on Africa.

=== South Africa ===
The historiography of South Africa has been one of the most contentious areas of the British Empire, involving a three-way division of sharply differing interpretations among the British, the Boers, and the black African historians. The first British historians emphasized the benefits of British civilization. Afrikaner historiography began in the 1870s with early laudatory accounts of the trekkers and undisguised anger at the British. After many years of conflict and warfare, the British took control of South Africa and historians began conciliatory effort to bring the two sides together in a shared history. An influential large-scale effort was made by George McCall Theal (1837-1919), who wrote many books as school teacher and as the official historian, such as History and Ethnography of Africa South of the Zambesi (11 vol, 1897–1919). In the 1920s, historians using missionary sources started presenting the Coloured and African viewpoints, as in W. M. Macmillan, Bantu, Boer and Briton: The Making of the South African Native Problem (London, 1929). Modern research standards were introduced by Eric A. Walker (1886–1976), who moved from a professorship at the University of Cape Town to become the Vere Harmsworth Professor of Imperial and Naval History at the University of Cambridge, where he trained a generation of graduate students. Afrikaner historiography increasingly defended apartheid.

==== Liberation historiography ====
The dominant approach in recent decades is to emphasize the roots of the liberation movement. Baines argues that the "Soweto uprising" of 1976 inspired a new generation of social historians to start looking for evidence that would allow the writing of history "from below"; often they adopted a Marxist perspective.

By the 1990s, historians were exploring comparative race relations in South Africa and the United States from the late 19th century to the late 20th century. James Campbell argues that black American Methodist missionaries to South Africa adopted the same standards of promoting civilization as did the British.

== Nationalism and opposition to the Empire ==
Opposition to imperialism and demands for self-rule emerged across the empire; in all but one case the British authorities suppressed revolts. However, in the 1770s, under the leadership of Benjamin Franklin, George Washington and Thomas Jefferson, it came to an armed revolt in the 13 American colonies, the American Revolutionary War. With military and financial help from France and others, the 13 became the first British colonies to secure their independence in the name of American nationalism.

There is a large literature on the Indian Rebellion of 1857, which saw a very large scale revolt in India, involving the mutiny of many native troops. It was suppressed by the British Army after much bloodshed.

The Indians organised under Mahatma Gandhi and Jawaharlal Nehru and finally achieved independence in 1947. They wanted one India but the Muslims were organized by Muhammad Ali Jinnah and created their own nation, Pakistan, in a process that still is heatedly debated by scholars. Independence came in the midst of religious communal violence, chiefly between Hindus and Muslims in border areas. Millions died and millions more were displaced as the conflicting memories and grievances still shape subcontinent tensions, as Jisha Menon argues.

Historians of the empire have recently paid close attention to 20th-century native voices in many colonies who demanded independence. The African colonies became independent mostly in a peaceful fashion. Kenya saw severe violence on both sides. Typically the leaders of independence had studied in England in the 1920s and 1930s. For example, the radical nationalist Kwame Nkrumah in 1957 led Ghana to become Britain's second African colony to gain independence (Sudan being the first being granted its independence a year earlier in 1956) and others quickly followed.

== Ideas of anti-imperialism ==
At an intellectual level, anti-imperialism appealed strongly to Marxists and liberals across the world. Both groups were strongly influenced by British writer John A. Hobson in his Imperialism: A Study (1902). Historians Peter Duignan and Lewis H. Gann argue that Hobson had an enormous influence in the early 20th century that caused widespread distrust of imperialism:

Hobson's ideas were not entirely original; however his hatred of moneyed men and monopolies, his loathing of secret compacts and public bluster, fused all existing indictments of imperialism into one coherent system....His ideas influenced German nationalist opponents of the British Empire as well as French Anglophobes and Marxists; they colored the thoughts of American liberals and isolationist critics of colonialism. In days to come they were to contribute to American distrust of Western Europe and of the British Empire. Hobson helped make the British averse to the exercise of colonial rule; he provided indigenous nationalists in Asia and Africa with the ammunition to resist rule from Europe.

== World War II ==
British historians of the Second World War have not emphasized the critical role played by the Empire in terms of money, manpower and imports of food and raw materials. The powerful combination meant that Britain did not stand alone against Germany, it stood at the head of a great but fading empire. As Ashley Jackson has argued," The story of the British Empire's war, therefore, is one of Imperial success in contributing toward Allied victory on the one hand, and egregious Imperial failure on the other, as Britain struggled to protect people and defeat them, and failed to win the loyalty of colonial subjects." The contribution in terms of soldiers numbered 2.5 million men from India, over 1 million from Canada, just under 1 million from Australia, 410,000 from South Africa, and 215,000 from New Zealand. In addition, the colonies mobilized over 500,000 uniformed personnel who serve primarily inside Africa. In terms of financing, the British war budget included £2.7 billion borrowed from the Empire's Sterling Area, And eventually paid back. Canada made C$3 billion in gifts and loans on easy terms. In terms of actual engagement with the enemy, there was a great deal in South Asia and Southeast Asia, as recalled by Ashley Jackson:

Terror, mass migration, shortages, inflation, blackouts, air raids, massacres, famine, forced labour, urbanization, environmental damage, occupation [by the enemy], resistance, Collaboration – all of these dramatic and often horrific phenomena shaped the war experience of Britain's imperial subjects.

== Decline and decolonization ==
Historians continue to debate when the Empire reached its peak. At one end, the insecurities of the 1880s and 1890s are mentioned, especially the industrial rise of the United States and Germany. The Second Boer War in South Africa, 1899-1902 angered an influential element of Liberal thought in England, and deprived imperialism of much moral support. Most historians agree that by 1918, at the end of the First World War, permanent long-term decline was inevitable. The dominions largely had freed themselves and began their own foreign and military policies. Worldwide investments had been cashed in to pay for the war, and the British economy was in the doldrums after 1918. A new spirit of nationalism appeared in many of the colonies, most dramatically in India. Most historians agree that following the Second World War, Britain lost its superpower status, and it was financially near bankruptcy. With the Suez fiasco of 1956, the profound weaknesses were apparent to all and rapid decolonization was inevitable.

The chronology and main features of decolonization of the British Empire have been studied at length. By far the greatest attention has been given to the situation in India in 1947, with far less attention to other colonies in Asia and Africa. Of course most of the scholarly attention focuses on newly independent nations no longer ruled by Britain. From the Imperial perspective, historians are divided on two issues: with respect to India, could London have handled decolonization better in 1947, or was what happened largely fixed in the previous century? Historians also disagree regarding a degree of involvement in the domestic British society and economy. Did Britons much care about decolonization, and did it make much difference to them? Bailkin points out that one view is that the domestic dimension was of minor importance, and most Britons paid little attention. She says that political historians often reach this conclusion. John Darwin has studied the political debates.

On the other hand, most social historians argue the contrary. They say the values and beliefs inside Britain about the overseas empire helped shape policy; the decolonization process proved psychologically wrenching to many people living in Britain, particularly migrants, and those with family experience with overseas civil service, business, or missionary activity. Bailkin says that decolonization was often taken personally, and had a major policy impact in terms of the policies of the British welfare state. She shows how some West Indian migrants were repatriated; idealists volunteered to help the new nations; a wave of overseas students came to British universities; and polygamous relationships were invalidated. Meanwhile, she says, the new welfare state was in part shaped by British colonial practices, especially regarding mental health and child care. Social historian Bill Schwarz says that as decolonization moved forward in the 1950s there was an upsurge in racial whiteness and racial segregation – the colour bar – became more pronounced.

Thomas Colley finds that informed Britons in the 21st century are in agreement that Britain has very often been at war over the centuries. They also agree that the nation has steadily lost its military prowess due to declines in its economy and disappearance of its empire.

== The new imperial history ==
The focus of attention of historians has shifted over time. Phillip Buckner reports that on a bygone era of graduate education in Britain when the Empire was

studied in a tradition that had been established in the late 19th century. By the 1960s the Empire was no longer seen as an unmitigated blessing for its subjects overseas and the emphasis of the newer studies was an attempt to reassess British policy-making from a more critical perspective. Nonetheless, mainstream imperial history still focused on policy-making at the imperial centre with considerable emphasis on relations between Britain and its colonies of settlement overseas and the emergence of modern Commonwealth.

Ronald Hyam argues that the historiography of the British Empire reached a state of severe crisis:

The early 1980s marked the end of an era ... as imperial and Commonwealth history itself everywhere became fragmented, unfashionable, and increasingly embattled. The old conceptual unities as they had been worked out in the previous half-century now collapsed, particularly under the pressure of the inexorable advance of area studies."

Hyam goes on to state that by the 21st century new themes had emerged including "post—colonial theory, globalisation, sex and gender issues, the cultural imperative, and the linguistic turn."

=== The native leadership ===
The studies of policy-making in London and the settlement colonies like Canada and Australia are now rare. Newer concerns deal with the natives, and give much more attention to native leaders such as Gandhi. They address topics such as migration, gender, race, sexuality, environmentalism, visualization, and sports. Thus there are entire chapters on economics, religion, colonial knowledge, agency, culture, and identity in the historiographical overview edited by Sarah E. Stockwell, The British Empire: Themes and Perspectives (2008). The new approaches to imperial history are often grouped together under the heading of the "new imperial history". These approaches have been distinguished by two features. Firstly, they have suggested that the British empire was a cultural project as well as a set of political and economic relationships. As a result, these historians have stressed the ways in which empire building shaped the cultures of both colonized peoples and Britons themselves.

=== Race and gender ===
In particular they have shown the ways in which British imperialism rested upon ideas about cultural difference and in turn how British colonialism reshaped understandings of race and gender in both the colonies and at home in Britain. Mrinalini Sinha's Colonial Masculinity (1995) showed how supposed British manliness and ideas about the effeminacy of some Indians influenced colonial policy and Indian nationalist thought. Antoinette Burton has been a key figure and her Burdens of History (1995) showed how white British feminists in the Victorian period appropriated imperialist rhetoric to claim a role for themselves in 'saving' native women and thereby strengthened their own claims to equality in Britain. Historians like Sinha, Burton, and Catherine Hall have used this approach to argue that British culture at 'home' was profoundly shaped by the empire during the 19th century.

=== Linkages binding the Empire together ===
The second feature that defines the new imperial history is its examination of the links and flows that connected different parts of the empire together. At first scholars looked at the empire's impact on domestic Britain, particularly in terms of everyday experiences. More recently, attention has been paid to the material, emotional, and financial links among the different regions. Both Burton and Sinha stress the ways in which the politics of gender and race linked Britain and India. Sinha suggested that these linkages were part of an "imperial social formation", an uneven but integrative set of arguments, ideas and institutions that connected Britain to its colonies. More recent work by scholars such as Alan Lester and Tony Ballantyne have stressed the importance of the networks that made up the empire. Lester's Imperial Networks (2001) reconstructed some of the debates and policies that linked Britain and South Africa during the 19th century. Ballantyne's Orientalism and Race developed an influential new model for writing about colonialism in highlighting the "webs of empire" that he suggested made up the empire. These webs were made up of the flows of ideas, books, arguments, money, and people that not only moved between London and Britain's colonies, but also moved directly from colony to colony, from places like India to New Zealand. Many historians now focus on these "networks" and "webs" and Alison Games has used this as a model for studying the pattern of early English imperialism as well.

=== The Oxford History of the British Empire ===
The major multi-volume multi-author coverage of the history of the British Empire is the Oxford History of the British Empire (1998–2001), five-volume set, plus a companion series. Douglas Peers says the series demonstrates that, "As a field of historical inquiry, imperial history is clearly experiencing a renaissance."

Max Beloff, reviewing the first two volumes in History Today, praised them for their readability and was pleased that his worry that they would be too anti-imperialist had not been realised. Saul Dubow in H-Net noted the uneven quality of the chapters in volume III and also the difficulty of such an endeavour give the state of historiography of the British Empire and the impossibility of maintaining a triumphalist tone in the modern era. Dubow also felt that some of the authors had tended "to 'play safe', awed perhaps by the monumental nature of the enterprise".

Madhavi Kale of Bryn Mawr College in Pennsylvania, writing in Social History, also felt that the history took a traditional approach to the historiography of the empire and placed the English, and to a lesser extent the Scottish, Irish and Welsh at the centre of the account, rather than the subject peoples of the empire. Kale summed up her review of volumes III-V of the history by saying it represented "a disturbingly revisionist project that seeks to neutralize ... the massive political and military brutality and repression" of the empire.

=== Postmodern and postcolonial approaches ===
A major unexpected development came after 1980 with a flood of fresh and innovative books and articles from scholars trained in non-British perspectives. Many had studied Africa, South Asia, the Caribbean, and the dominions. The new perspective strengthened the field rather than destroying it. Further imaginative approaches, which occasioned sharp debates, came from literary scholars especially Edward Said and Homi K. Bhabha, as well as anthropologists, feminists, and other newcomers. Longtime experts suddenly confronted the strange new scholarship with theoretical perspectives such as post-structuralism and post-modernism. The colonial empire was becoming "postcolonial." Instead of painting the globe red any more, the Empire's history became part of a new global history. New maps were drawn emphasizing the oceans more than the land masses, yielding new perspectives such as Atlantic history.

The old consensus among historians held that in India British imperial authority was quite secure from 1858 to World War II. Recently, however, this interpretation has been challenged. For example Mark Condos and Jon Wilson argue that imperial authority in the Raj was chronically insecure. Indeed the anxiety of generations of officials produced a chaotic administration with minimal coherence. Instead of a confident state capable of acting as it chose, these historians find a psychologically embattled one incapable of acting except in the abstract, small scale, or short term. Meanwhile Durba Ghosh offers an alternative approach.

== Impact on Britain and British memory ==
Turning away from most political, economic, and diplomatic themes historians recently have looked at the intellectual and cultural impact of the Empire on Britain itself. Ideologically, Britons promoted the Empire with appeals to the ideals of political and legal liberty. Historians have always commented on the paradox of the dichotomy of freedom and coercion inside the Empire, of modernity and tradition. Sir John Seeley, for example, pondered in 1883:

How can the same nation pursue two lines of policy so radically different without bewilderment, be despotic in Asia and democratic in Australia, be in the East at once the greatest Mussulman Power in the World ... and at the same time in the West be the foremost champion of free thought and spiritual religion.

Historian Douglas Peers emphasizes that an idealized knowledge of the Empire permeated popular and elite thought in Britain during the 19th century:

No history of nineteenth-century Britain can be complete without acknowledging the impact that the empire had in fashioning political culture, informing strategic and diplomatic priorities, shaping social institutions and cultural practices, and determining, at least in part, the rate and direction of economic development. Moreover, British identity was bound up with the empire.

Politicians at the time and historians ever since have explored whether the Empire was too expensive for the British budget. Joseph Chamberlain thought so but he had little success at the Imperial Conference of 1902 asking overseas partners to increase their contribution. Canada and Australia spoke of funding a warship—the Canadian Senate voted it down in 1913. Meanwhile, the Royal Navy adjusted its war plans to focus on Germany, economizing on defending against lesser threats in peripheral areas such as the Pacific and Indian Oceans. Public opinion supported military spending out of pride, but the left in Britain leaned toward pacifism and deplored the waste of money.

In the Porter–MacKenzie debate the historiographical issue was the impact of the Imperial experience on British society and thinking. Porter argued in 2004 that most Britons were largely indifferent to empire. Imperialism was handled by elites. In the highly heterogeneous British society, "imperialism did not have to have impact greatly on British society and culture." John M. MacKenzie countered that there is a great deal of scattered evidence to show an important impact. His position was supported by Catherine Hall, Antoinette Burton and Jeffrey Richards.

In a survey of the British population by YouGov in 2014, respondents "think the British Empire is more something to be proud of (59%) rather than ashamed of (19%).... A third of British people (34%) also say they would like it if Britain still had an empire. Under half (45%) say they would not like the Empire to exist today."

== See also ==
- British Empire Economic Conference (1932)
- Cambridge School of historiography led by John Gallagher and Ronald Robinson
- Commonwealth Heads of Government Meeting
- Historiography of the United Kingdom
- Historiography of the causes of World War I
- Imperial Conference, Covers the meetings of prime ministers in 1887, 1894, 1897, 1902, 1907, 1911, 1921, 1923, 1926, 1930, 1932, in 1937
  - 1887 Colonial Conference
- Imperial War Cabinet
- International relations of the Great Powers (1814–1919)
- New Imperialism, re 1880–1910
- Pageant of Empire
- Porter–MacKenzie debate what role did colonialism play in shaping British culture
- The Cambridge History of the British Empire
- The Oxford History of the British Empire
- Timeline of imperialism
- Western imperialism in Asia
