= Porter–MacKenzie debate =

Historiographical controversy about the British Empire

The Porter–MacKenzie debate, a historiographical controversy in the field of Modern British and Imperial history, focuses on the extent to which colonialism influenced British culture during the 19th and 20th centuries. The debate featured disagreement between the academic historians Bernard Porter and John MacKenzie, beginning in 2004. Porter argued that British imperial expansion during the era of New Imperialism had little effect on ordinary people in the United Kingdom, while MacKenzie argued that colonialism dominated British popular culture for much of the period.

== Debate ==
The debate began when Porter's book The Absent-Minded Imperialists appeared in print in 2004. The book argued that Empire had very little influence on British popular culture in the nineteenth and twentieth centuries, arguing that this was the only explanation for the absence during a period of rapid imperial expansion. Porter argued that ordinary British people between 1800 and 1940 were largely indifferent to empire:

there can be no presumption that Britain [...] was an essentially 'imperialist' nation in the nineteenth and twentieth centuries. Of course she was, in the sense of acquiring and ruling an empire; but that empire [...] might not have been as burdensome as it appeared. Consequently, it did not need to have had deep roots in British society — in its culture, for example — or to have affected it greatly in its turn.

Absent-Minded Imperialists argued against the conclusions of previous academic studies which had stressed the extent to which imperialism had shaped European culture, following Edward Said's Culture and Imperialism (1993). Porter also attacked the conclusions of other works, like MacKenzie's 1984 Propaganda and Empire which looked at the influence of imperialist propaganda in British culture. Porter was critical of this "MacKenzie school" who argued that the influence of imperialist propaganda "must have been overwhelming if there was so much of it". According to Porter, "an alternative reading, however, might be that it could not have been all that persuasive, if the propagandists felt they needed to propagandize so hard." Additionally, he critiqued the source base of MacKenzie's study, suggesting that MacKenzie had selected his texts arbitrarily.

The book received mixed reviews, with the American historian Antoinette Burton rejecting it as not "worth arguing either with or about". Some academics argued that the book, which was received well in the popular press, would appeal to British nationalists as absolving them of responsibility for empire; a claim which Porter rejected. In a 2008 article, MacKenzie accused Porter of sidestepping inconvenient evidence by refusing to address it directly, especially when it would affect his argument:

In Absent-Minded Imperialists, Porter uses an archaeological metaphor to suggest that all historians have found have been 'shards' of little structural significance. As it happens, I was trained as an archaeologist and very nearly became one. I have found a lot of shards and, to the archaeologist, an assemblage of such shards in their deposits implies the existence of a culture, not its absence.

Historians who are considered to support the MacKenzie position are Catherine Hall, Antoinette Burton and Jeffrey Richards. Andrew Thompson notably supported Porter. Thompson argues that there was no one ‘imperial culture’ in the nineteenth century and that empire had a complicated position in British culture.

== See also ==
- Historiography of the British Empire
- "The Imperialism of Free Trade"
