= The Triumphant Empire =

1962 book by Lawrence H. Gipson

- Author: Lawrence H. Gipson
- Language: English
- Genre: Non-fiction
- Publication place: United States
- Pages: 414

The Triumphant Empire: Thunder-Clouds Gather in the West 1763-1766 is a book by Lawrence H. Gipson. It won the Pulitzer Prize for History in 1962.
