= Michael Mullett =

British historian and academic (1943–2026)

Michael A. Mullett

Principal of County College, Lancaster
- In office 1976–1981
- Preceded by: John M. MacKenzie

Personal details
- Born: Michael Alan Anthony Mullett; 14 February 1943 Cardiff, Wales
- Died: 10 February 2026 (aged 82) Carlisle, Cumbria, England
- Education: St Illtyd's Catholic High School, Rumney; University of Wales; Trinity Hall, Cambridge; University of Lancaster

Academic background
- Academic advisor: John H. Plumb

Academic work
- Discipline: History
- Sub-discipline: Early modern Britain; Modern Britain; Reformation; Catholic Reformation; History of Religion; Political history
- Institutions: University of Lancaster

Michael Alan Anthony Mullett (14 February 1943 – 10 February 2026) was a British historian and academic who was Professor of Religious and Cultural History at the University of Lancaster.

== Career ==
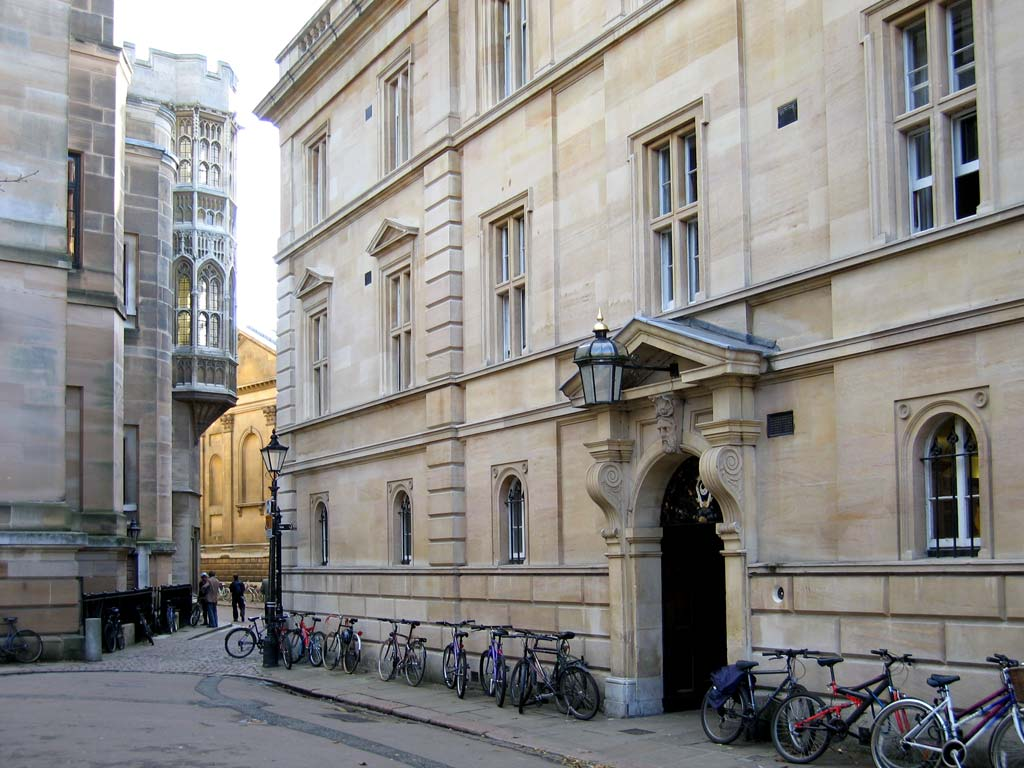
Trinity Hall, Cambridge

Born in Cardiff on 14 February 1943, Mullett was educated at St Illtyd's Catholic High School, Rumney. After attaining his Bachelor of Arts (BA) degree in History at the University of Wales, Cardiff, he pursued further studies at Trinity Hall, Cambridge, with his Master of Letters (MLitt) thesis on “The Crown and the Corporations, 1660–1689”, supervised by John H. Plumb awarded in 1972. He had been recruited by Austin Woolrych to join the staff of the Department of History as a Lecturer at the University of Lancaster in 1968.

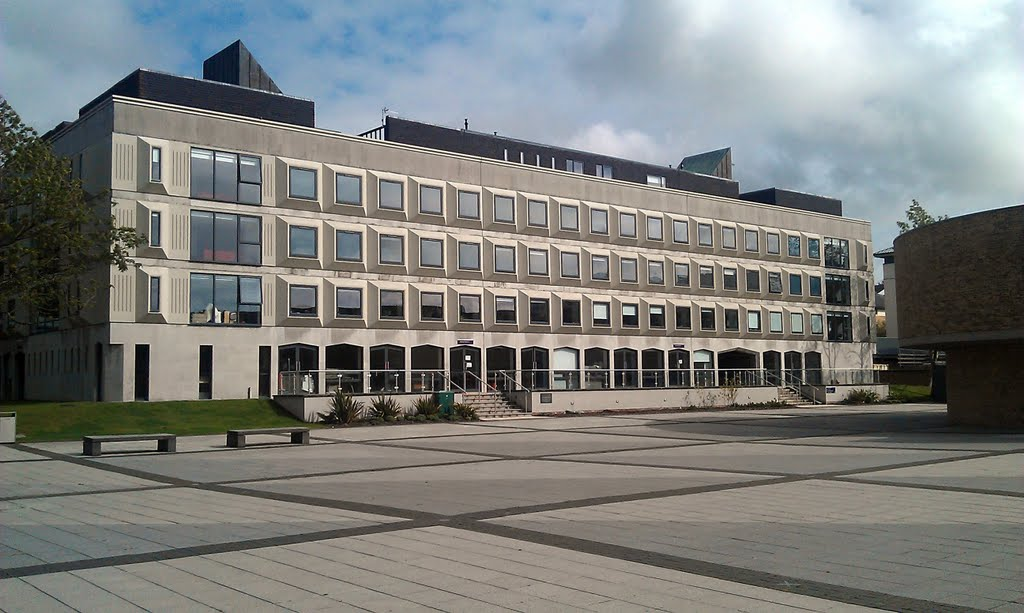
The County College, Lancaster

Mullett was awarded his doctorate (PhD) at Lancaster, succeeded John M. MacKenzie as Principal of County College, Lancaster from 1981 to 1985 and then as Vice-Principal, and was awarded a personal chair as Professor of Religious and Cultural History in 2001. Along with his colleagues Michael Winstanley and Marcus Merriman, he pioneered the "History in the Community" Programme of projects, facilitating undergraduates' practical experience with external organisations. Following his retirement, he was Professor Emeritus and Honorary Research Fellow in History from 2008.

Mullett's research focussed on religious history and especially radical and dissenting movements. His works on Catholicism included Catholics in Britain and Ireland, 1558–1828 (1998), his six volumes of collected writings on English Catholicism, 1680–1830 (2006) and The Catholic Reformation (1999). His works on John Bunyan, Martin Luther, and Quakerism in the North West, as well as his six-volume history of Penrith are of especial note.

Mullett was a major figure in the Cumberland and Westmorland Antiquarian and Archaeological Society as Council Member, Chair of the Publication Committee, and Editor of the society's Transactions from 2009 to 2013. He was Reviews Editor for the European History Quarterly for many years, and contributed 24 biographies to the Oxford Dictionary of National Biography.

Mullett died at the Eden Valley Hospice, Carlisle, Cumbria, after a long illness.

== Selected publications ==
=== Books ===
- Mullett, M.A. (2024), Faith and Religion in Cumbria: Volume 2: The Eighteenth and Nineteenth Centuries, Carlisle: Bookcase, ISBN 9781912181728
- Mullett, M.A. (2024), Faith and Religion in Cumbria: Volume 1: From Prehistoric Times to the Seventeenth Century, Carlisle: Bookcase, ISBN 9781912181711
- Mullett, Michael A. (2022). A New History of Penrith: Volume 6: Penrith in the Twentieth Century, 1900–1974 – Essays on the Public Realm. Carlisle: Bookcase. ISBN 9781912181520.
- Mullett, M.A. (2020), A New History of Penrith: Volume 5: Penrith in the Nineteenth Century – The Victorian Town, Carlisle: Bookcase, ISBN 9781912181346
- Mullett, M.A. (2019), A New History of Penrith: Volume 4: Penrith in the Eighteenth Century 1715–1800, Carlisle: Bookcase, ISBN 9781912812097
- Mullett, M.A. (2018), A New History of Penrith: Volume 3: Penrith in the Stuart Century 1603–1714, Carlisle: Bookcase, ISBN 9781912181100
- Mullett, M.A. (2017), A New History of Penrith: Volume 2: Penrith under the Tudors, Carlisle: Bookcase, ISBN 9781912181001
- Mullett, M.A. (2017), A New History of Penrith: Volume 1: From Pre-History to the Close of the Middle Ages, Carlisle: Bookcase, ISBN 9781901414998
- Mullett, M. A. (2015), Patronage, Power and Politics in Appleby in the Era of Lady Anne Clifford 1649–1689, Kendal: Cumberland and Westmorland Antiquarian and Archaeological Society, ISBN 978-1873124710.
- Mullett, M.A. (2012), The End Crowns the Work: George Leo Haydock 1774–1849, Wigan: North West Catholic History Society
- Mullett, M.A. (2010), The A to Z of the Reformation and Counter-Reformation, Lanham, Md.: Scarecrow Press, ISBN 978-0810876040
- Mullett, M.A. (2010), Historical Dictionary of the Reformation and Counter-Reformation, Historical Dictionaries of Religions, Philosophies, and Movements Series, vol. 100, Lanham, Md.: Scarecrow Press, ISBN 978-0810858152
- Mullett, M.A., ed. (2024), English Catholicism, 1680–1830: Volume 6: English Catholic Writings on Liturgy and Prayer; Instruction and Scripture; Hagiography, Church History and Pious Biography, 1777–1823, London: Pickering and Chatto, doi:10.4324/9781003549956, ISBN 9781138753136
- Mullett, M.A., ed. (2024), English Catholicism, 1680–1830: Volume 5: English Catholic Writings on Religious Controversies, 1791–1830, London: Pickering and Chatto, doi:10.4324/9781003550044, ISBN 9781138753129
- Mullett, M.A., ed. (2024), English Catholicism, 1680–1830: Volume 4: English Catholic Writings on Hagiography, Pious Biography and Church History, Prayer, Liturgy and Instruction, 1755–78, London: Pickering and Chatto, doi:10.4324/9781003548614, ISBN 9781138753112
- Mullett, M.A., ed. (2006), English Catholicism, 1680–1830: Volume 3: English Catholic Writings on Religious Controversies, 1736–91, London: Pickering and Chatto, doi:10.4324/9781003550037, ISBN 9781138753105
- Mullett, M.A., ed. (2006), English Catholicism, 1680–1830: Volume 2: English Catholic Writings on Devotion, Prayer, Liturgy, Instruction, Hagiography and Church History, 1686–1755, London: Pickering and Chatto, doi:10.4324/9781003548607, ISBN 9781138753099
- Mullett, M.A., ed. (2006), English Catholicism, 1680–1830: Volume 1: English Catholic Writings on Religious Controversies, 1685–1736, London: Pickering and Chatto, doi:10.4324/9781003551232, ISBN 9781138753082
- Mullett, M.A. (2004), Martin Luther, Routledge Historical Biographies, London: Routledge, ISBN 978-0415261678
- Mullett, M.A. (1999), The Catholic Reformation, London: Routledge, ISBN 978-0415189156
- Mullett, M.A. (1999), Catholics in Britain and Ireland, 1558–1829, Social History in Perspective, New York: St Martin’s Press, ISBN 978-0333590188
- Mullett, M.A. (1996), John Bunyan in Context, Keele: Keele University Press, ISBN 978-1853311628
- Mullett, M.A. (1994), James II and English Politics, 1678–88, London: Routledge, ISBN 9780415090421
- Mullett, M.A.; Hamm, T.D. (1994), New Light on George Fox (1624 to 1691), York: Ebor Press, ISBN 9781850721420
- Mullett, M.A. (1991), Sources for the History of English Nonconformity, 1660–1830, London: British Records Association, ISBN 978-0900222092
- Mullett, M.A. (1989), Calvin, London: Routledge, ISBN 978-1134989904
- Mullett, M.A. (1987), Martyrs of The Diocese of Lancaster, Preston: Snape and Co., ASIN B00112CI9M
- Mullett, M.A. (1987), Popular Culture and Popular Protest in Later Medieval and Early Modern Europe, London: Croom Helm, ISBN 978-0709935667
- Mullett, M.A. (1984), The Counter-Reformation and the Catholic Reformation in Early Modern Europe, London: Methuen, ISBN 9780416360608
- Mullett, M.A. (1980), Radical Religious Movements in Early Modern Europe, London: Allen and Unwin, ISBN 978-1032506579
- Mullett, M.A. (1978), Early Lancaster Friends, Lancaster: University of Lancaster Centre for North-West Regional Studies, Occasional Paper, ISBN 9780901699497

=== Articles and chapters ===
- Mullett, M.A.; Perriam, D. (2025), "Basil Fielding (or Feilding, d. 1697): A Reassessment", Transactions of the Cumberland & Westmorland Antiquarian & Archaeological Society, 3rd Series, 25: 242–248, ISSN 0309-7986
- Mullett, M.A.; Perriam, D. (2025), "'A Lasting Memorial to his Scholarship': C.M.L. Bouch (1890–1959)", Transactions of the Cumberland & Westmorland Antiquarian & Archaeological Society, 3rd Series, 25: 197–206, ISSN 0309-7986
- Mullett, M.A. (2024), ""A man full of deep and wide learning": C. Roy Hudleston, 1905–1992", Transactions of the Cumberland & Westmorland Antiquarian & Archaeological Society, 3rd series, 24: 137–149, ISSN 0309-7986
- Mullett, M.A. (2021), "Demystifying a Dean: More on 'Papal Aggression'", Transactions of the Cumberland & Westmorland Antiquarian & Archaeological Society, 3rd series, 21: 277–281, doi:10.5284/1090535, ISSN 0309-7986
- Mullett, M.A.; Mullett, L. (2021), "'The Bill, the whole Bill and nothing but the Bill': The 1831 General Election in Cumberland", Transactions of the Cumberland & Westmorland Antiquarian & Archaeological Society, 3rd Series, 21: 197–214, doi:10.5284/1090529, ISSN 0309-7986
- Mullett, M.A. (2020), "'Your Majesty's Loyal and Dutiful Subjects': Carlisle and 'Papal Aggression'", Transactions of the Cumberland & Westmorland Antiquarian & Archaeological Society, 3rd Series, 20: 157–170, doi:10.5284/1084910, ISSN 0309-7986
- Mullett, M.A. (2019), "'For the helthe of my Soull': The Will of John Hoton of Penrith", Transactions of the Cumberland & Westmorland Antiquarian & Archaeological Society, 3rd Series, 19: 276–280, doi:10.5284/1084898, ISSN 0309-7986
- Mullett, M.A. (2007), ""This irreligious art of liing": Strategies of Disguise in Post-Reformation English Catholicism", Journal of Historical Sociology, 20 (3): 328–40, doi:10.1111/j.1467-6443.2007.00311.x, ISSN 0952-1909
- Mullett, M.A. (2006), "Dr Marcus Merriman", The Guardian
- Mullett, M.A. (2005), "The Literature of the Counter-Reformation", in Pavlovski, L. (ed.), Literature Criticism from 1400 to 1800, vol. 109, Farmington Hills: Thomson Gale, pp. 221–33, ISBN 978-0787687267
- Mullett, M.A. (2002), "Quaker and Catholic Attitudes to Work, Rest and Play", in Swanson, R.N. (ed.), The Use and Abuse of Time in Christian History, Studies in Church History, vol. 37, Woodbridge: Boydell and Brewer, ISBN 978-0952973379
- Mullett, M.A. (2002), "The Reformation in the Parish of Whalley", in Poole, Robert (ed.), The Lancashire Witches: Histories and Stories, Manchester: Manchester University Press, pp. 88–104, ISBN 978-0719062049
- Mullett, M.A. (2007), "Reformation and Renewal, 1450–1690", in White, A.J. (ed.), A History of Lancaster, Edinburgh: Edinburgh University Press, pp. 73–116, ISBN 9780748614660
- Mullett, M.A. (2000), "Counter-Reformation or Catholic Reformation Revisited", History Today, 38: 21–25
- Mullett, M.A.; Mews, S. (1999), "Catholicism and the Church of England in a Northern Library: Henry Halsted and the Burnley Grammar School Library", in Wood, Diana (ed.), Life and Thought in the Northern Church, c.1100–c.1700: Essays in Honour of Claire Cross, Studies in Church History: Subsidia, 12, Woodbridge: Boydell Press, pp. 533–547, ISBN 978-0952973324
- Mullett, M.A. (1999), "John Lingard in Context", in Hilton, J.A. (ed.), A Catholic of the Enlightenment: Essays on Lingard's Work and Times, North West Catholic History Society, pp. 2–9, ISBN 978-0953102051
- Mullett, M.A. (1999), "The Education of Ignatius Loyola", History Today, 35: 8–13, ISSN 0018-2753

Academic offices
| Preceded by John M. MacKenzie | Principal of the The County College, Lancaster; 1981–1985 | Succeeded by |
Professional and academic associations
| Preceded by | Editor of the Cumberland and Westmorland Antiquarian and Archaeological Society; 2009–2013 | Succeeded by |
