= John MacKenzie (historian) =

British historian (1943–2026)

John MacDonald MacKenzie FRHistS FRSE

Dean of Education University of Lancaster
- In office 1994–1996

Dean of Arts and Humanities University of Lancaster
- In office 1992–1994

Principal of County College, Lancaster
- In office 1976–1981
- Succeeded by: Michael Mullett

Personal details
- Born: 2 October 1943 Manchester, Greater Manchester, England
- Died: 18 September 2026 (age 82) Alyth, Perthshire, Scotland
- Citizenship: British

Academic background
- Education: University of Glasgow (MA Hons) University of British Columbia (PhD)

Academic work
- Discipline: Historian
- Institutions: University of British Columbia; University of Rhodesia (Zimbabwe); University of Liverpool; Wilfrid Laurier University; University of Lancaster

John MacDonald MacKenzie FRHistS FRSE Dr h.c. (2 October 1943 - 18 September 2026) was a leading British historian of imperialism who pioneered the study of popular and cultural imperialism, as well as aspects of environmental history. He has also written about Scottish migration and the development of museums around the world. He was Professor of imperial history at Lancaster University and founder of the Manchester University Press Studies in Imperialism series (1984).

== Biography ==
MacKenzie was born in Northenden, Manchester, on 2 October 1943. He was the son of Alexander MacKenzie and Hannah (née Whitby) and was schooled in Glasgow (Scotland) and Ndola (Zambia), before graduating from the University of Glasgow and completing his Ph.D (1969) at the University of British Columbia in Vancouver and in London. This cosmopolitan upbringing developed his interest in the history of the British Empire, a subject he has written about in Echoes of Empire and How Empire Shaped Us, and he travelled extensively throughout its former territories. At Lancaster University he became the first Dean of Arts and Humanities. Among his non-academic posts and responsibilities, he was also chairman of governors of two schools in Morecambe, Lancashire, and was a magistrate of the Lancaster petty sessions (1990-2000). He retired from Lancaster University in 2002 and moved to Perthshire, Scotland. His partner of 45 years was Nigel Dalziel. He died at his home in Alyth on 18 September 2026 suffering from pancreatic cancer.

== Academic career ==
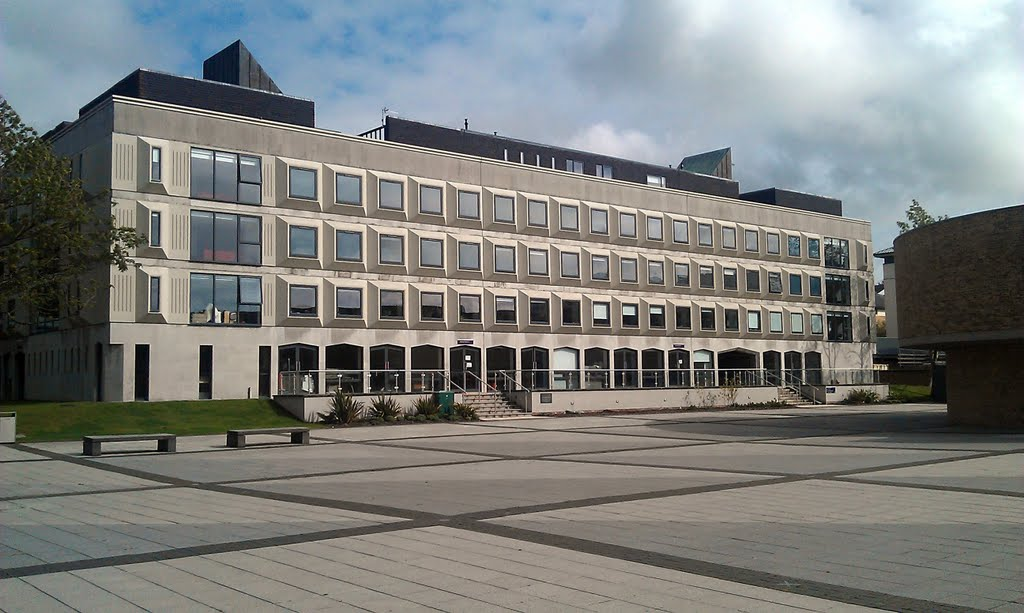
The County College, Lancaster

At the beginning of his career he taught at the University of British Columbia, and subsequently at the University of Rhodesia (Zimbabwe), the University of Liverpool, and Wilfrid Laurier University, Ontario. His principal post from 1968 was at the University of Lancaster, where he held the chair of imperial history from 1991 to 2002. He was also successively Principal of The County College, Dean of Arts and Humanities and Dean of Education. He held honorary professorships of the Universities of Aberdeen, St Andrews and Stirling and was an honorary professorial fellow of the University of Edinburgh. In 2016 he became Visiting Professor at the Centre for History, University of the Highlands and Islands.

His early work, the subject of his Ph.D, was on labour migration and pre-colonial technology and trade in Central Africa. He conducted oral research throughout Rhodesia (now Zimbabwe) in 1973-1974 and this gave him a keen awareness of the traditional relationships between African communities and their environments. He was also influenced by his experiences as an archaeologist both in Scotland and in Africa, which served to emphasise his belief that much important historical evidence is to be found in sources other than documents. This helped lead to his pioneering development of the study of the popular culture of imperialism in his books Propaganda and Empire (1984) and (edited) Imperialism and Popular Culture (1986), in which he argued that empire had just as significant effects upon the dominant as upon the subordinate societies. He used a wide range of materials from cultural sources, including ephemera. This proved to be controversial since some elements of the historical Establishment considered that British domestic history was somehow little connected with its empire.

In the Porter–MacKenzie debate his ideas were challenged by Bernard Porter in the latter’s The Absent-Minded Imperialists, although Porter never actually confronted MacKenzie's evidence head-on. However, MacKenzie’s followers have mounted a vigorous fight-back, not least in the many books in the Manchester University Press Studies in Imperialism series dealing with the cultural history of empire, which he established and edited from 1984 to 2012. By 2026 it had reached a total of 200 titles making it the most successful academic series relating to the history of imperialism in British publishing. Its prime concern remains the conviction that imperialism as a cultural phenomenon had as significant an effect on the dominant as on the subordinate societies. Cross-disciplinary work has appeared across the full spectrum of cultural phenomena, examining aspects of sex and gender, law, science, the environment, language and literature, migration, patriotic societies and much else.

His next book, The Empire of Nature (1988), was an early contribution to the environmental history of empire, particularly charting the human relationship with animals, through both hunting and conservation, in the imperial take-over of Africa and India. His wider ideas on environmental history were set out in the Thomas Callander Memorial Lectures at the University of Aberdeen in 1995, and helped to open up a major field to which many other scholars have contributed.

He once again entered the realm of controversy with his critique of Edward Said's Orientalism, published in 1995, which was badly received by post-Saidians and post-colonialists, although many of his early publications pioneered their later work. Said's strict binarism and concentration on concepts of the "other" were countered by MacKenzie's insistence that Orientalism could, in certain circumstances, involve constructive cross-cultural influences, notably in the arts. These notions were later accepted and developed by other scholars. His interest in the visual arts was reflected in his chapter on the subject in the Cambridge Illustrated History of the British Empire (1996) as well as in Exhibiting the Empire (2015).

His 1991 professorial inaugural lecture "Scotland and the British Empire" was well received and opened up new fields for him, including various aspects of work on the Scottish Diaspora. This led to his book The Scots in South Africa (with Nigel R. Dalziel) of 2007 (while associated with the Research Institute of Irish and Scottish Studies at Aberdeen University) and a number of edited works. These analysed notions of sub-British ethnicity and identity, not least in their associational, religious and cultural manifestations. He then developed the concept of the four nations and empire, extending the arguments of J. G. A. Pocock to the British Empire, suggesting that it was not so much "British" as a combination of Irish, Scottish, Welsh and English empires, reflecting a range of ethnic skill sets, cultures and identities which in turn influenced British domestic history.

His lifelong interest in museums produced Museums and Empire (2009), a work resulting from a Leverhulme Trust Emeritus Fellowship which examined the dispersal of the idea of the museum in Canada, South Africa, Australia, New Zealand, India, Sri Lanka and Singapore. This embedded the development of these institutions within the colonial bourgeois public spheres while reflecting contemporary interests in natural history and ethnography which in turn served to develop the individual identities of various colonies. Latterly he became particularly interested in comparative empires and the manner in which such parallel studies can illuminate the history of the British Empire.

Andrew S. Thompson's edited book Writing Imperial Histories was published in 2013 celebrating the significance and influence of his Studies in Imperialism series. The same year Karl S. Hele's edited The Nature of Empires and the Empires of Nature, consciously echoing the title of his own earlier book of 1997, examined his environmental work while greatly extending it, notably in Canada.

In 2016 a festschrift conference was held in MacKenzie's honour at the Burn House in Angus, Scotland. The resulting book, The MacKenzie Moment and Imperial History edited by Stephanie Barczewski and Martin Farr, described itself as celebrating the career of "eminent historian of the British Empire, John M. MacKenzie, who pioneered the examination of the impact of the Empire on metropolitan culture". It was structured around the cultural impact of empire, "Four-Nations" history, and the global and transnational perspectives, in essays demonstrating MacKenzie's influence but also interrogating his legacy for the study of imperial history, not only for Britain and the nations of Britain but also in comparative and transnational context. The contributions from seventeen international scholars "make crystal clear why the interpretational shifts initiated by MacKenzie’s work are of lasting importance" (Martin Thomas, University of Exeter UK).

In 2020 MacKenzie published the first of two complementary synoptic works addressing cultural aspects of the British Empire. Pursuing his long-standing interest in the built environment, The British Empire Through Buildings sought to illuminate the history of the empire through the examination of its architecture and urban planning. It revealed the manner in which imperial rule was established and consolidated, and its globalising impact in both styles of architecture and urban development. It also illustrated the ways in which the economic ambitions of colonies together with the needs of British settlers and agents were met.

This analysis illuminated the complexities of class and the racial dimensions of empire, and further insights were gleaned from the manner in which aspects of the built environment have been adopted and adapted for a post-colonial world. This was the first work to analyse such issues across the entire British Empire, in all its various types of colonies across five continents.

A second equally ambitious work emerged in 2022 with A Cultural History of the British Empire, a ground-breaking history and analysis of British imperial culture involving everything from sports such as horse-racing and cricket to art, statuary, theatre and ceremonial forms. As these were dispersed across the world through the agency of British representatives, emigrants and travellers, facilitated by the rapid growth of print, photography, film, and radio, imperialists imagined this new global culture would cement the unity of the empire. Instead, MacKenzie showed that this remarkably wide-ranging spread of ideas and influences had unintended and surprising results. Colonized peoples adapted elements to their own ends, subverting British expectations and eventually beating them at their own game. As indigenous communities integrated their own cultures with the British imports, with a profound influence on the global culture of the present day, the empire itself was increasingly undermined.

=== Editorial roles ===
He has also been an editor of major reference works, including Peoples, Nations and Cultures (2005) and the four-volume Encyclopaedia of Empire (2016), and has contributed many articles and reviews to journals as well as chapters in books. He was editor of the journal Environment and History, 2000-2005 and was editor-in-chief of Britain and the World, the Journal of the British Scholar Society 2015-2020.

=== Media and other ===
He has given BBC Radio talks, has appeared on television programmes relating to the British Empire, and has written for The Scotsman and other newspapers. He was historical adviser for exhibitions at the National Portrait Gallery, London, and the Royal Scottish Academy, Edinburgh (both on David Livingstone, 1997) and the Victoria and Albert Museum, London ("Inventing New Britain: The Victorian Vision", 2001). He also contributed to the catalogue accompanying the exhibition "Inspired by the East: how the Islamic world influenced Western art", held at the British Museum, London, in 2019. In 1979 he wrote and presented a BBC World About Us documentary on the MV Dwarka, last of the British India line ships plying the old imperial sea route between Bombay (Mumbai) and Kuwait.

== Honours ==
He was a Fellow of the Royal Society of Edinburgh. In November 2021 he was awarded an Honorary Doctorate of Aix-Marseille University in France.

== Bibliography ==
=== Books ===
- MacKenzie, J. M. (1984), Propaganda and Empire: The Manipulation of British Public Opinion, 1880-1960 (Revised ed.), Manchester: Manchester University Press, ISBN 978-0719-018-69-5
- MacKenzie, J. M.; Richards, Jeffrey (1986), The Railway Station: a Social History, Oxford: Oxford University Press, ISBN 978-0571269037
- MacKenzie, J. M. (1988), The Empire of Nature: Hunting, Conservation and British Imperialism, Manchester: Manchester University Press, ISBN 978-0719052279
- MacKenzie, J. M. (1995), Orientalism: History, Theory and the Arts, Manchester: Manchester University Press, ISBN 978-0719045783
- MacKenzie, J. M. (1997), Empires of Nature and the Nature of Empires, Manchester: Manchester University Press, ISBN 978-1862320598
- MacKenzie, J. M. (2007), The Scots in South Africa: Ethnicity, Identity, Gender and Race, 1772-1914, Manchester: Manchester University Press, ISBN 978-0719087837
- MacKenzie, J. M. (2009), Museums and Empire: Natural History, Human Cultures and Colonial Identities, Manchester: Manchester University Press, ISBN 978-0719083679
- MacKenzie, J. M. (2020), The British Empire through Buildings: Structure, function and meaning, Manchester: Manchester University Press, doi:10.7765/9781526145970, ISBN 978-1526145963
- MacKenzie, J. M. (2022), A Cultural History of the British Empire, London: Yale University Press, ISBN 9780300260786

=== Edited books ===
- MacKenzie, J. M., ed. (1986), Imperialism and Popular Culture, Manchester: Manchester University Press, doi:10.7765/9781526119568, ISBN 978-0719018688
- MacKenzie, J. M., ed. (1990), Imperialism and the Natural World, Manchester: Manchester University Press, doi:10.7765/9781526123671, ISBN 978-0719029004
- MacKenzie, J. M., ed. (1992), Popular Imperialism and the Military, Manchester: Manchester University Press, doi:10.7765/9781526123602, ISBN 978-0719033582
- MacKenzie, J. M., ed. (1997), David Livingstone and the Victorian Encounter with Africa, London: National Portrait Gallery, ISBN 978-1855141773
- MacKenzie, J. M.; Hiery, Hermann J., eds. (1997), European Impact and Pacific Influence: British and German Policy in the Pacific Islands and the Indigenous Response, London: I. B. Tauris/German Historical Institute London, ISBN 978-1860640599
- MacKenzie, J. M., ed. (2001), The Victorian Vision: Inventing New Britain, London: Victoria and Albert Museum Publications, ISBN 978-1851773282
- MacKenzie, J. M., ed. (2005), Peoples, Nations and Cultures, London: Weidenfeld & Nicolson, ISBN 978-0304365500
- MacKenzie, J. M., ed. (2011), European Empires and the People: Popular Responses to Imperialism in France, Britain, The Netherlands, Belgium, Germany and Italy, Manchester: Manchester University Press, ISBN 978-0719079955
- MacKenzie, J. M.; Devine, T. M., eds. (2011), Scotland and the British Empire, Oxford: Oxford University Press, ISBN 978-0199573240
- MacKenzie, J. M.; Glass, Bryan S., eds. (2015), Scotland, Empire and Decolonisation in the Twentieth Century, Manchester: Manchester University Press, ISBN 978-0719096174
- MacKenzie, J. M.; McAleer, John, eds. (2015), Exhibiting the Empire: Cultures of display and the British Empire, Manchester: Manchester University Press, ISBN 978-1526118356
- MacKenzie, J. M., ed. (2016), Encyclopedia of Empire, London: Wiley-Blackwell, 4 volumes, ISBN 978-1118440643
- MacKenzie, J. M.; McCarthy, Angela, eds. (2016), Global Migrations: the Diaspora of the Scots since 1600, Edinburgh: Edinburgh University Press, ISBN 978-1474410045

Academic offices
Preceded by	Dean of Education of the University of Lancaster; 1994–1996	Succeeded by
Preceded by	Dean of Arts and Humanities of the University of Lancaster; 1992–1994	Succeeded by
Preceded by	Principal of County College, Lancaster; 1976–1981	Succeeded by Michael Mullett
Professional and academic associations
Preceded by	Editor of Environment and History; 2000–2005	Succeeded by
