= John Darwin (historian) =

British historian and academic (born 1948)

John Darwin CBE FBA
- Born: John Gareth Darwin; 29 June 1948 (age 78); Exeter, Devon, England
- Title: Professor of Global and Imperial History
- Spouse: Caroline Atkinson (m. 1973)
- Children: Three
- Awards: Wolfson History Prize (2008)

Academic background
- Education: Brockenhurst Grammar School
- Alma mater: University of Oxford (MA, DPhil)
- Thesis: The Lloyd George coalition government and Britain's imperial policy in Egypt and the Middle East, 1918–1922 (1976)

Academic work
- Discipline: History
- Institutions: University of Reading; University of Oxford; Nuffield College, Oxford
- Doctoral students: Andrew Thompson

John Gareth Darwin CBE FBA (born 29 June 1948) is a British historian and academic, who specialises in the history of the British Empire. From 1984 to 2019, he was the Beit Lecturer in Commonwealth History at the University of Oxford and a Fellow of Nuffield College, Oxford. He was a lecturer in history at the University of Reading between 1972 and 1984.

== Early life and education ==
Darwin was born on 29 June 1948 in Exeter, Devon, England. He was educated at Brockenhurst Grammar School, a mixed-sex state grammar school in Brockenhurst, Hampshire. He studied history at St John's College, Oxford, graduating with a Bachelor of Arts (BA) degree; as per tradition, his BA was promoted to a Master of Arts (MA Oxon) degree. He later undertook postgraduate research at Nuffield College, Oxford, and completed his Doctor of Philosophy degree in 1978 on the coalition government of David Lloyd George and Britain's imperial policy in Egypt and the Middle East between 1918 and 1922.

== Career ==
From 1972 to 1984, Darwin was a lecturer in history at the University of Reading. In 1984, he moved to the University of Oxford where he had been appointed the Beit Lecturer in the History of the Commonwealth of Nations. That year, he was also elected a Fellow of Nuffield College, Oxford. Since October 2014, he had been the Director of the Oxford Centre for Global History. In November 2014, he was granted a Title of Distinction as Professor of Global and Imperial History. As of 2019, he is retired. His current research is into the role of the great port cities of the nineteenth and twentieth centuries.

=== Honours and awards ===
In 2008, Darwin was awarded the Wolfson History Prize for his book After Tamerlane: The Global History of Empire since 1405. In 2012, he was elected a Fellow of the British Academy (FBA).

He was appointed Commander of the Order of the British Empire (CBE) in the 2020 New Year Honours for services to the study of global history.

=== Publications ===
- Britain, Egypt, and the Middle East: Imperial Policy in the Aftermath of War, 1918–1922 (May 1981)
- The Empire of the Bretaignes, 1175–1688: The Foundations of a Colonial System of Government: Select Documents on the Constitutional History of The ... Volume I (Documents in Imperial History) (1985)
- Britain and Decolonisation: The Retreat from Empire in the Post-War World (Making of the 20th Century) (1988)
- The End of the British Empire: The Historical Debate (Making Contemporary Britain) (1991)
- After Tamerlane: The Global History of Empire Since 1405 (2008)
- The Empire Project: The Rise and Fall of the British World-System, 1830–1970 (2009)
- Unfinished Empire: The Global Expansion of Britain (2013)
- Unlocking the World: Port Cities and Globalization in the Age of Steam, 1830–1930 (2020)

== Personal life ==
In 1973, Darwin married Caroline Atkinson. Together they have three daughters.

== See also ==
- Jeremy Black (historian)
