= Bernard Porter =

British historian and academic (born 1941)

- Born: 5 February 1941 (age 85)

Academic background
- Education: Corpus Christi College, Cambridge

Bernard John Porter (born 5 February 1941) is a British historian and academic. He is Emeritus Professor of Modern History at Newcastle University.

Porter read history at Corpus Christi College, Cambridge. After receiving his BA, MA, and PhD from Corpus, he took a position as a research fellow at his old college before moving to the University of Hull to become a senior lecturer in modern history. Since 1992, he has been an Emeritus Professor at Newcastle. He is perhaps best known for his most recent book, Absent-Minded Imperialists, published in 2004 which sparked a historiographical debate with John Mackenzie on the place of imperialist sentiment within British popular culture.

== Bibliography ==
- The Lions Share (Longman, 2004)
- The Refugee Question in Mid-Victorian Politics (Cambridge University Press, 1979)
- Britain, Europe, and the World, 1850-1986 (Allen and Unwin, 1983)
- Origins of the Vigilant State (Boydell and Brewer, 1987)
- Britannia's Burden (Hodder, 1994)
- Absent-Minded Imperialists (Oxford University Press, 2004)

== Personal life ==
He lives in Stockholm, Sweden. He is fond of art, architecture, cricket, classical music, and science fiction books. He is a fellow of the Royal Historical Society.
