= Lawrence Henry Gipson =

American historian

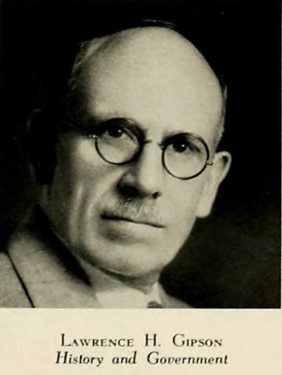
Lawrence H. Gipson, 1938

Lawrence Henry Gipson (December 7, 1880 – September 26, 1971) was an American historian, who won the 1950 Bancroft Prize and the 1962 Pulitzer Prize for History for volumes of his magnum opus, the fifteen-volume history of "The British Empire Before the American Revolution", published 1936–70. He was a leader of the "Imperial school" of historians who studied the British Empire from the perspective of London, and generally praised the administrative efficiency and political fairness of the Empire.

== Career ==
A native of Greeley, Colorado, Gipson moved with his family to Caldwell, Idaho, as a boy. After dropping out of high school, he worked at various odd jobs (such as mining and driving stage coaches), as well as at the family business, Caxton Press, which published Idaho Odd Fellow, the Gem State Rural and Livestock Farmer.

Gipson graduated from the University of Idaho in 1903. He was then selected to be one of the first Rhodes Scholars. Receiving his B.A. from Oxford University in 1907 he said: "One disadvantage that our first delegation of Rhodes Scholars labored under was the fact that we attracted so much attention. I am sure that no subsequent group was ever the object of such intense curiosity. Almost inevitably we were made conscious that each of us was on trial, especially in the eyes of the scholarly world. We were even made to feel that in a sense the reputation of American scholarship was in our hands."

Returning to the United States, Gipson taught at The College of Idaho for three years and, in 1909, married Jeannette Reed (who died in 1967). He then attended Yale University as a Farnham Fellow from 1910 to 1911 before being named head of the history department at Wabash College, a position he held until 1924. While teaching at Wabash, he received his Ph.D. from Yale University, in 1918. He studied with the eminent colonialist Charles M. Andrews and received the university's John Addison Porter Prize for that year.

== Historian ==
In 1924, Gipson was appointed professor of history at Lehigh University, a position he held until his death. Although best known as a historian of Colonial America and its place in the British Empire, two of Gipson's earliest articles had to do with the Civil War and Reconstruction. His assessment of Andrew Johnson ("The Statesmanship of President Johnson: A Study of the Presidential Reconstruction Policy") was published in the Mississippi Valley Historical Review in December 1915; and "The Collapse of the Confederacy" appeared in the Mississippi Valley Historical Review in March 1918. His Yale doctoral dissertation, which was written under the guidance of Charles M. Andrews, was accepted in 1918 and published two years later by Yale University Press as Jared Ingersoll: A Study of American Loyalism in Relation to British Colonial Government (1920), for which he received the Justin Winsor Prize from the American Historical Association. He contributed seven entries to the Dictionary of American Biography, and three articles to the Dictionary of American History.

Gipson's magnum opus was the fifteen-volume series The British Empire Before the American Revolution (15 vols., 1936–70) - the first three volumes were published by The Caxton Printers in Caldwell, Idaho, and the remaining volumes were published by Alfred A. Knopf in New York. Gipson spent decades on the project, completing the final volume only shortly before his death. Three of the volumes were given significant historical prizes:

- The Great War for the Empire: The Years of Defeat, 1754-1757 (volume 6): The 1948 Columbia University Loubat Prize
- The Great War for the Empire: The Victorious Years, 1758-1760 (volume 7): The 1950 Bancroft Prize of Columbia University
- The Triumphant Empire: Thunderclouds Gather in the West, 1763-1766 (volume 10): The 1962 Pulitzer Prize in History

Gipson believed that the American Revolution was a direct result of changes that occurred in the British Empire after 1763, due to Britain's victory in the French and Indian War/Seven Years' War, which he referred to as "The Great War for the Empire." His thesis is succinctly presented in his article "The American Revolution as an Aftermath of the Great War for the Empire, 1754-1763," which was published in the March 1950 issue of Political Science Quarterly. He paid tribute to his mentor in "Charles McLean Andrews and the Re-orientation of the Study of American Colonial History," which appeared in the July 1935 issue of the Pennsylvania Magazine of History and Biography.

One of Gipson's last publications was the introduction to a 1969 Festschrift for Ross J. S. Hoffman, who was a history professor at Fordham University. Gipson noted that he himself was a member of the Congregational Church and a descendant of the pilgrim William Brewster, while Hoffman was a convert to Roman Catholicism and a staunch defender of that faith - and yet they were good friends.

Gipson died on September 26, 1971, in Bethlehem, Pennsylvania; his ashes were buried in Caldwell. He left his entire estate to Lehigh University, providing the core funding for the Gipson Institute.

== See also ==
- Historiography of the British Empire
