= Andrew Thompson (historian) =

British historian and academic (born 1968)

Andrew Thompson CBE FRHistS
- Born: 3 June 1968 (age 58); Mansfield, England, United Kingdom
- Title: Professor of Global and Imperial History
- Children: 2

Academic background
- Education: Loughborough Grammar School
- Alma mater: University of Oxford (PhD)
- Thesis: Thinking imperially?: Imperial pressure groups and the idea of Empire in late-Victorian and Edwardian Britain (1994)
- Doctoral advisor: John Darwin

Andrew Stuart Thompson CBE FRHistS (born 3 June 1968) is a British historian and academic. He specialises in modern British history, Imperialism, and the British Empire. Since September 2019, he has been Professor of Global and Imperial History at the University of Oxford and a Professorial Fellow at Nuffield College, Oxford. Thompson co-chairs the Global and Imperial History Centre. He previously taught at the University of Leeds and the University of Exeter. He was Executive Chair of the Arts and Humanities Research Council (AHRC) from 2018 to 2020, having previously been its chief executive on a part-time basis.

== Early life and education ==
Thompson was born on 3 June 1968 in Mansfield, Nottinghamshire, England. He was educated at Loughborough Grammar School, an all-boys private school in Loughborough, Leicestershire. He studied modern history at Regent's Park College, Oxford, and graduated with a Bachelor of Arts (BA) degree in 1990; as per tradition, this was promoted to a Master of Arts (MA Oxon) degree in 1991. He then undertook postgraduate research at Nuffield College, Oxford, under the supervision of John Darwin. He completed his Doctor of Philosophy (DPhil) degree in 1994 with a doctoral thesis on Thinking imperially?: Imperial pressure groups and the idea of Empire in late-Victorian and Edwardian Britain.

== Academic career ==
Thompson began his career as a tutorial fellow in modern history at Corpus Christi College, Oxford, between 1993 and 1997. He joined the University of Leeds as a lecturer in 1997. He was Professor of Imperial and Global History at the University of Leeds from 2005 to 2011. He was additionally its Pro-Vice-Chancellor for Research between 2009 and 2011. From 2011 to 2017, he was Professor of Modern History at the University of Exeter. He moved to the University of Oxford in September 2019, where he had been appointed Professor of Global Imperial History and elected a Professorial Fellow at Nuffield College, Oxford.

From December 2015 until March 2017, Thompson served as interim chief executive of the Arts and Humanities Research Council (AHRC). He was then selected to continue as its CEO, serving until his appointment as Executive Chair in 2018. He stepped down from that role in August 2020.

Thompson is also editor of the Studies in Imperialism book series at Manchester University Press.

== Honours ==
Thompson was appointed Commander of the Order of the British Empire (CBE) in the 2021 New Year Honours for services to research.

== Publications ==
- Thompson, Andrew S. (2000). Imperial Britain: the empire in British politics, c. 1880–1932. Harlow: Longman. ISBN 978-0582319202.
- Thompson, Andrew (2005). The Empire strikes back?: the impact of imperialism on Britain from the mid-nineteenth century. Harlow: Pearson Longman. ISBN 978-0582438293.
- Magee, Gary B.; Thompson, Andrew S. (2010). Empire and Globalisation: Networks of People, Goods and Capital in the British World, c.1850-1914. Cambridge: Cambridge University Press. ISBN 978-0521898898.
- Thompson, Andrew, ed. (2012). Britain's Experience of Empire in the Twentieth Century. Oxford: Oxford University Press. ISBN 978-0199236589.
- Thompson, Andrew S., ed. (2013). Writing imperial histories. Manchester: Manchester University Press. ISBN 978-0719086007.
- Fedorowich, Kent; Thompson, Andrew S., eds. (2013). Empire, migration and identity in the British World. Manchester: Manchester University Press. ISBN 978-0719089565.
