= Alan Lester =

British historian and historical geographer

Alan Lester is a British historical geographer and historian whose research focuses on the British Empire, imperial networks, colonial governance, humanitarianism, race, and the historical geographies of colonialism. He is Professor of Historical Geography at the University of Sussex and Adjunct Professor of History at La Trobe University in Australia. He is a Fellow of the Royal Historical Society and Corresponding Fellow of the Australian Academy of the Humanities. Lester's research has examined the relationships between Britain and its colonies, particularly the ways in which people, ideas, institutions and political practices moved across imperial territories. His work has focused especially on southern Africa, Australia, New Zealand and the wider British Empire during the nineteenth century.

== Early life and education ==
Alan Lester was born on 18 March 1968 in the Harringay Ladder part of Haringey, North London. His father was a Master Carpenter and builder and his mother a pharmacist’s assistant. He was educated at Latymer grammar school, Edmonton, North London. Lester studied geography at the University of Cambridge, where he received a Bachelor of Arts degree in 1989. He subsequently completed a Postgraduate Certificate in Education in geography at the University of London's Institute of Education in 1990 and a PhD in geography education at the same institution in 1995.

== Academic career ==
Lester began his professional career as a geography teacher at St. Ignatius College in Enfield, London, while completing his doctoral studies. He subsequently taught human geography at St Mary's University College, serving as lecturer from 1994 to 1997 and senior lecturer from 1997 to 2000.

In 2000, Lester joined the University of Sussex as a lecturer in human geography. He became senior lecturer in 2002, Reader in Human Geography in 2004, and Professor of Historical Geography in 2006. He later served as Head of the Department of Geography from 2007 to 2010, Research Theme Leader for Global Transformations from 2010 to 2012, Director of Interdisciplinary Research from 2012 to 2016, and Deputy Pro-Vice-Chancellor for Research from 2016 to 2018. The University of Sussex currently lists him as Professor of Historical Geography. From 2017 to 2020, Lester was Research Professor in History at La Trobe University in Australia. He subsequently became Adjunct Professor of History at La Trobe.

Lester has also held visiting and research positions in Australia, New Zealand and South Africa, including a visiting lectureship at Rhodes University and an Erskine Fellowship at the University of Canterbury.

== Research ==
Lester's research has contributed to the historical geography of the British Empire and to scholarship on imperial networks. His work examines colonialism not simply as a relationship between a metropolitan centre and separate colonial peripheries, but as a system of projects and connections involving people, ideas, institutions and political practices operating across different parts of the empire.

His early research concentrated on South Africa. His first book, From Colonization to Democracy: A New Historical Geography of South Africa, was published in 1996. His subsequent book Imperial Networks: Creating Identities in Nineteenth-Century South Africa and Britain (2001) examined British colonialism in the Eastern Cape and the connections between colonial developments in South Africa, Britain and other parts of the empire. The book explored official, humanitarian and settler forms of colonial discourse and their interaction in the colonization of the Xhosa.

Lester's research subsequently expanded to comparative and trans-imperial studies of colonial humanitarianism. With Fae Dussart, he examined the movement of ideas and institutions concerned with the protection of Indigenous peoples between different parts of the British Empire. Their research included the development of Aboriginal protection in Australia and Aotearoa New Zealand and its connections with the Caribbean, the Cape Colony and Britain.

His research has also addressed the relationship between race, humanitarianism and colonial frontier politics. In a 2011 article in Transactions of the Institute of British Geographers, he examined the emergence of ideas of inherent racial difference in relation to political contests and trans-imperial mobilization in nineteenth-century colonial frontier regions.

== Major works ==
=== Imperial Networks ===
Imperial Networks: Creating Identities in Nineteenth-Century South Africa and Britain was published by Routledge in 2001. The book examines the colonization of the Eastern Cape and argues for understanding colonial South Africa through its connections with Britain and other parts of the British Empire. The work became associated with the development of approaches emphasizing networks and connections within imperial history. Later descriptions of Lester's scholarship have identified Imperial Networks as an important contribution to the spatial and trans-imperial study of colonialism.

=== Colonial Lives Across the British Empire ===
Lester co-edited Colonial Lives Across the British Empire: Imperial Careering in the Long Nineteenth Century with David Lambert. The collection examined the careers and movements of individuals within the British Empire, emphasizing how personal trajectories intersected with the circulation of ideas, commodities, capital and institutions across imperial territories. The book was an important contribution to the study of life histories and trans-imperial mobility.

=== Colonisation and the Origins of Humanitarian Governance ===
With Fae Dussart, Lester co-authored Colonisation and the Origins of Humanitarian Governance: Protecting Aborigines Across the Nineteenth-Century British Empire. The work examined the development of colonial humanitarian institutions and the ways in which policies concerning Indigenous peoples were transferred and adapted across different imperial settings. His related research traced the movement of Aboriginal protection as a contested institution between Britain, the Caribbean, southern Africa, Australia and New Zealand.

=== Ruling the World ===
Lester co-authored Ruling the World: Freedom, Civilisation and Liberalism in the Nineteenth-Century British Empire with Kate Boehme and Peter Mitchell. Published by Cambridge University Press in 2021, the book examines imperial government at three moments in the nineteenth century—1838, 1857 and 1879—and considers how British officials responded to events occurring simultaneously across different parts of the empire. The book uses examples from Canada, southern Africa, the Caribbean, Australia, India and Afghanistan to examine the interaction between metropolitan government, colonial administrations, settlers and colonized populations. It considers the ways in which concepts including freedom, civilization and liberalism were applied ambivalently within the imperial system.

=== Deny and Disavow ===
Lester's Deny and Disavow: Distancing the Imperial Past in the Culture Wars was published in 2022. The book examines contemporary political and cultural disputes over interpretations of Britain's imperial past and the relationship between historical scholarship and public debates about colonialism.

=== The Truth About Empire ===
In 2024, Lester edited The Truth About Empire: Real Histories of British Colonialism, published by Hurst. A BBC History Magazine book of the year for 2024, the collection brings together essays by historians examining different aspects of British colonialism and its legacies. Its contributors address colonial history in places including Australia, China, India and South Africa, while the book also considers contemporary disputes over the interpretation of the British Empire. The book was reviewed in International Affairs in 2025, where reviewer Samir Puri situated it within the renewed public and scholarly interest in empire and imperial legacies.

== Professional activities ==
Lester is a co-editor of the Manchester University Press Studies in Imperialism monograph series, which publishes research on imperial history and related subjects. In 2022, he delivered the Distinguished Historical Geographer Lecture at the annual meeting of the Association of American Geographers. His lecture was titled "Space, Simultaneity and the Global Restructuring of the British Empire."

== Selected works ==
- Lester, Alan (1996). From Colonisation to Democracy: A New Historical Geography of South Africa. I.B.Tauris. ISBN 978-0-7556-2600-7
- Lester, Alan; Binns, Tony; Nel (2000). South Africa Past, Present and Future. Prentice Hall. ISBN 978-0-582-35626-9
- Lester, Alan (2001). Imperial Networks: Creating Identities in Nineteenth-century South Africa and Britain. Psychology Press. ISBN 978-0-415-25914-9.
- Lambert, David; Lester, Alan, eds. (2006). Colonial Lives Across the British Empire: Imperial Careering in the Long Nineteenth Century. Cambridge University Press. ISBN 978-0-521-84770-4.
- Lester, Alan; Dussart, Fae (2014). Colonization and the Origins of Humanitarian Governance: Protecting Aborigines across the Nineteenth-Century British Empire. Cambridge University Press. ISBN 978-1-107-00783-3.
- Damodaran, Vinita; Winterbottom, Anna; Lester, Alan, eds (2015) .The East India Company and the Natural World. ISBN 978-1-349-49109-4
- Laidlaw, Z.; Lester, Alan, eds. (2015). Indigenous Communities and Settler Colonialism: Land Holding, Loss and Survival in an Interconnected World. Springer. ISBN 978-1-137-45236-8.
- Lester, Alan; Boehme, Kate; Mitchell, Peter (2021). Ruling the World: Freedom, Civilisation and Liberalism in the Nineteenth-Century British Empire. Cambridge University Press. ISBN 978-1-108-56747-3.
- Lester, Alan (2021). Deny and Disavow: Distancing the Imperial Past in the Culture Wars. SunRise Publishing. ISBN 978-1-914489-14-3.
- Lester, Alan, ed. (2024). The Truth About Empire: Real Histories of British Colonialism. Hurst Publishers. ISBN 978-1-80526-143-8.

== External websites ==
Official website
