= Antoinette Burton =

American historian

- Born: 1961 (age 64–65)

Academic background
- Education: Yale University; University of Chicago

Academic work
- Discipline: History
- Sub-discipline: British Empire
- Institutions: University of Illinois at Urbana–Champaign

Antoinette M. Burton (born 1961) is an American historian and professor of history at the University of Illinois, Urbana-Champaign.

Since 2015, Antoinette Burton has served as the director of the Humanities Research Institute at the University of Illinois, Urbana-Champaign.

She was named a 2018 Presidential Fellow for the University of Illinois system along with Wendy Lee, and in 2019, she was named the Maybelle Leland Swanlund Endowed Chair at the University of Illinois, Urbana-Champaign.

== Awards and Appointments ==
- 2010 Guggenheim Fellowship
- 2014 NEH Fellowship
- 2023 Appointed to the Board of Illinois Humanities
- 2025 Elected to the American Academy of Arts and Sciences

== Works ==
- Histories of a Radical Book: E. P. Thompson and The Making of the English Working Class. Berghahn Books, 2020. ISBN 978-1-78920-328-8
- Animalia: An Anti-Imperial Bestiary for Our Times (with Renisa Mawani). Duke University Press, 2020. ISBN 978-1-4780-1128-6
- The Trouble With Empire: Challenges to Modern British Imperialism Duke University Press, 2015. ISBN 978-0199936601
- Ten Books That Shaped the British Empire: Creating an Imperial Commons (with Isabel Hofmeyr). Duke University Press, 2014. ISBN 978-0-8223-5827-5
- An Illinois Sampler: Teaching and Research on the Prairie (with Mary-Ann Winkelmes). University of Illinois Press, 2014. ISBN 978-0-252-08023-4
- Empires and the Reach of the Global: 1870-1945 (with Tony Ballantyne). Harvard University Press, 2014. ISBN 978-0-674-28129-5
- The First Anglo-Afghan Wars: A Reader. Duke University Press, 2014. ISBN 978-0-8223-5662-2
- A Primer for Teaching World History: Ten Design Principles. Duke University Press, 2011. ISBN 978-0-8223-5188-7
- Empire in Question: Reading, Writing, and Teaching British Imperialism. Duke University Press, 2011. ISBN 978-0-8223-4902-0
- Moving Subjects: Gender, Mobility and Intimacy in an Age of Global Empire. University of Illinois Press, 2008. ISBN 978-0-252-07568-1
- The Postcolonial Careers of Santha Rama Rau. Duke University Press, 2007. ISBN 978-0-8223-4071-3
- Bodies in Contact: Rethinking Colonial Encounters in World History. Tony Ballantyne, Antoinette M. Burton, Duke University Press, 2005. ISBN 978-0-8223-3467-5
- Archive stories: facts, fictions, and the writing of history, Editor Antoinette M. Burton, Duke University Press, 2005, ISBN 978-0-8223-3688-4
- "When Was Britain? Nostalgia for the Nation at the End of the "American Century", The Journal of Modern History Vol. 75, No. 2, June 2003.
- Dwelling in the Archive: Women Writing House, Home and History in Late Colonial India. Oxford University Press, 2003. ISBN 978-0-19-514425-3
- After the Imperial Turn: Thinking with and through the Nation, Duke University Press, 2003, ISBN 978-0-8223-3142-1
- Politics and Empire in Victorian Britain: A Reader, Editor Antoinette M. Burton, Palgrave Macmillan, 2001, ISBN 978-0-312-29335-2
- Gender, Sexuality and Colonial Modernities (editor). Routledge, 1999. ISBN 978-0-415-51368-5
- At the Heart of the Empire: Indians and the Colonial Encounter in Late Victorian Britain. University of California Press, 1998. ISBN 978-0-520-20958-9
- Burdens of History: British Feminists, Indian Women and Imperial Culture, 1865-1915. University of North Carolina Press, 1994. ISBN 978-0-8078-4471-7
- Review article Not Even Remotely Global? Method and Scale in World History History Workshop Journal, no. 64 (Autumn 2007), pp. 323 - 328, Oxford University press
- Burdens of History: British Feminists, Indian Women and Imperial Culture, 1865-1915. University of North Carolina Press, 1994. ISBN 978-0-8078-4471-7
