= Postgraduate research =

Postgraduate research represents a formal area of study that is recognized by a university or institute of higher learning. The notion of "postgraduate" refers to studies following a undergraduate degree. Postgraduate research either occurs within a postgraduate degree that also includes taught elements, such as the thesis completed after the all but dissertation stage of an American-style Doctor of Philosophy (PhD) degree, or refers to research degrees common in Commonwealth countries such as a masters by research or British-style doctorate.

== Structure ==
The structure of postgraduate research programs can vary significantly from one country to another. To enter into a PhD program in the United States, students generally must have some form of prerequisite study beyond their basic graduate qualification. This may be a Master's coursework program, which acts as a qualifier for entry. In other countries, entry to Doctoral or Master's research programs is based on the academic track record of the candidates in their undergraduate degrees.

Many students confuse the notion of postgraduate research with “invention” and “discovery”. Postgraduate research ultimately represents an apprenticeship in the field of research. In his textbook, Key Factors in Postgraduate Research – A Guide for Students. Dario Toncich explains that the objective of postgraduate research is not necessarily to make a breakthrough invention or, indeed, a major scientific discovery.

It is, rather, a mechanism by which graduate students learn how to undertake a systematic investigation, founded upon the work built by peers in the field, and then to extend the current state of knowledge. In the context of assessing a postgraduate research program, it is generally the systematic process of research and investigation that is given more attention than the level to which knowledge is extended. The title "doctor" emanates from the Latin word docera—to teach. Hence there is an expectation that the recipient of a doctorate would go on to become some form of "teacher" in the broad sense of the word.

== History ==
In the 19th century, postgraduate research was a rarity, with countries such as the United States only having a small number of candidates across their university spectrum. However, by the start of the 21st century, postgraduate research, and postgraduate qualifications, had become commonplace. In any one year, at a global level, there are hundreds of thousands of candidates undertaking postgraduate research programs. For this reason the nature of postgraduate research has also changed.

At Doctoral level, there is some recognition that it is no longer reasonable to expect major research breakthroughs as part of a postgraduate research program. To this end, Doctoral research more commonly now represents an extension of knowledge, rather than some form of breakthrough. There is also some recognition that modern postgraduate research programs now have to be conducted in the light of massive amounts of previously published work, and hence the literature review process has become significantly more complex.

The nomenclature associated with titles arising from postgraduate research vary from one institution to another and one country to another. Postgraduate research programs generally result in a thesis/dissertation, which is assessed by independent experts in the field. The specific nature of the thesis varies from one discipline to another and from one country to another. In addition, some universities insist that students also undertake a viva-voce oral examination in which they can defend their research and processes before an expert panel.

In India, generally, the higher the level of the research degree the less association it has with a specific discipline. For example, at Bachelor's level, it would be common to receive a BSc(Chemistry). At Master's level, the corresponding degree would be an MSc (without the specific subdiscipline). At Doctoral level, the degree would be simply PhD with no discipline stated. This is intended to show that the recipient of the award has mastered techniques that are more generic than those encapsulated in a specific discipline or subdiscipline. There are some exceptions to this. In a professional Doctorate, where the objective is to demonstrate an in-depth research knowledge of a particular area, the discipline is usually included (e.g., Doctor of Business).

In some universities, it is also possible for candidates to achieve what is referred to as a "higher doctorate". This is generally an award bestowed upon people who have made a substantial contribution to their discipline through their research. Higher doctorates would normally be awarded after a significant research career and therefore those who receive such awards generally already have a basic PhD to begin with. Like professional doctorates, higher doctorates generally carry the title of the discipline to which the research contributions have been made—for example, Doctor of Engineering.

== See also ==
- Postgraduate education
- Postdoctoral researcher
