= Jeffrey Richards =

British historian

Academic background
- Education: Jesus College, Cambridge

Academic work
- Discipline: Historian
- Institutions: Lancaster University

Jeffrey Richards (born c.1945) is a British historian.

== Caeeer ==
Alexandra Square, Lancaster University

Educated at Jesus College, Cambridge, he is Professor of Cultural History at Lancaster University. A leading cultural historian and film critic, he is the author of over 15 books on British cultural history. His books include The Popes and the Papacy in the Early Middle Ages 476–752 (1979), and Sir Henry Irving: A Victorian Actor and His World (2005). He is also a Companion of the Guild of St George.

== Selected publications ==
- Richards, Jeffrey (2017), China and the Chinese in Popular Film: From Fu Manchu to Charlie Chan, Cinema and Society, London: I. B. Tauris, ISBN 978-1350212138
- Richards, Jeffrey (2017), Dancing in the English Style: Consumption, Americanisation, and National Identity in Britain, 1918–50, Studies in Popular Culture, Manchester: Manchester University Press, ISBN 978-1784994334
- Richards, Jeffrey; Newey, Katherine; Yeandle, Peter, eds. (2016), Politics, Performance, and Popular Culture: Theatre and Society in Nineteenth-Century Britain, Studies in Popular Culture, Manchester: Manchester University Press, ISBN 978-0719091698
- Richards, Jeffrey (2008), Hollywood's Ancient Worlds, London: Bloomsbury, ISBN 978-1847250070
- Richards, Jeffrey (2005), Sir Henry Irving: A Victorian Actor and His World (1st ed.), London: Hambledon Continuum, ISBN 978-1-85285591-8
- Richards, Jeffrey (2003), A Night to Remember: The Definitive Titanic Film, London: I. B. Tauris, ISBN 978-1860648496
- Richards, Jeffrey (2001), Imperialism and Music: Britain, 1876–1953, Studies in Imperialism, Manchester: Manchester University Press, ISBN 978-0719045066
- Richards, Jeffrey; Wilson, Scott; Woodhead, Linda, eds. (1999), Diana: The Making of a Media Saint, London: I. B. Tauris, ISBN 978-1860643880
- Richards, Jeffrey (1998), The Unknown 1930s: An Alternative History of the British Cinema 1929–1939, London: I. B. Tauris, ISBN 978-1860646287
- Richards, Jeffrey (1997), Films and British National Identity: From Dickens to Dad's Army, Studies in Popular Culture, Manchester: Manchester University Press, ISBN 978-0719047435
- Richards, Jeffrey, ed. (1997), Filming T. E. Lawrence: Korda's Lost Epic, London: I. B. Tauris, ISBN 978-1860640483
- Richards, Jeffrey, ed. (1994), Sir Henry Irving: Theatre, Culture and Society; Essays, Addresses and Lectures (1st ed.), Keele: Ryburn, ISBN 978-1-85331062-1
- Richards, Jeffrey (1994), Sex, Dissidence, and Damnation: Minority Groups in the Middle Ages, London: Routledge, ISBN 978-0415071475
- Richards, Jeffrey (1989), Imperialism and Juvenile Literature, Studies in Imperialism, Manchester: Manchester University Press, ISBN 978-0719024207
- Richards, Jeffrey (1988), Happiest Days: The Public Schools in English Fiction, Manchester: Manchester University Press, ISBN 978-0719027758
- Richards, Jeffrey, ed. (1987), Mass Observation at the Movies, London: Routledge, ISBN 978-1138980556
- Richards, Jeffrey (1986), Britain can take it: The British Cinema during the Second World War, Oxford: Blackwell, ISBN 978-1845114459
- MacKenzie, J.M.; Richards, Jeffrey (1986), The Railway Station: a Social History, Oxford: Oxford University Press, ISBN 978-0571269037
- Richards, Jeffrey (1984), Age of the Dream Palace: Cinema and Society in Britain 1930-1939 (1st ed.), London: Routledge, ISBN 978-0-41504666-4 (2nd ed.) I. B. Tauris, 2010, ISBN 978-1-84885122-1
- Richards, Jeffrey; Aldgate, Anthony (1983), Best of British: Cinema and Society from 1930 to the present (1st ed.), Oxford: Basil Blackwell, ISBN 978-0-63113018-5 (2nd ed.) I. B. Tauris, 1999, ISBN 978-1-86064288-3
- Richards, Jeffrey (1980), Consul of God: The Life and Times of Gregory the Great, London: Routledge, ISBN 978-1138777569
- Evans, E.J.; Richards, Jeffrey (1980), A Social History of Britain in Postcards, 1870–1930, London: Longman, ISBN 978-0582502925
- Richards, Jeffrey (1979), The Popes and the Papacy in the Early Middle Ages 476–752, London: Routledge, ISBN 978-1138777880
- Richards, Jeffrey (1977), Swordsmen of the Screen: from Douglas Fairbanks to Michael York, Cinema and Society, London: Routledge, ISBN 978-0710084781
- Richards, Jeffrey (1973), Visions of Yesterday, London: Routledge, ISBN 978-1138994089
