= Historiography of India =

The historiography of India refers to the studies, sources, critical methods and interpretations used by scholars to develop a history of India.

In recent decades there have been four main schools of historiography in how historians study India: Cambridge, Nationalist, Marxist, and subaltern. The once common "Orientalist" approach, with its image of a sensuous, inscrutable, and wholly spiritual India, has died out in serious scholarship.

== Sources ==
=== Foreign ===
Well-known foreign accounts of Indian history come from the following sources:

- Indica (Megasthenes) by Megasthenes
- A Record of Buddhist Kingdoms (Foguo Ji 佛國記) by Faxian
- Kitāb al-Hind by Al-Biruni
- Tuḥfat an-Nuẓẓār fī Gharāʾib al-Amṣār wa ʿAjāʾib al-Asfār by Ibn Battuta
- Great Tang Records on the Western Regions by Xuanzang
- Descriptio Indiæ, by Joseph Tiefenthaler

=== Native ===
Examples of native historiographical texts include:

- Harshacharita by Bhanabhatta
- Rajatarangini by Kalhana
- Ceylonese Buddhist chronicles, such as the Dīpavaṃsa, Mahāvaṃsa, and Cūḷavaṃsa
- Tārīkh-i Firishta (also known as Gulshan-i Ibrāhīmī) by Firishta
- Tārīkh-i-Firuz Shāhī by Ziauddin Barani
- Vicāraśreṇī by Merutunga
- Akbarnama by Abul Fazl
- Tughlaq Nama by Amir Khusrau
- Padshahnama by Abdul Hamid Lahori
- Jawami ul-Hikayat by Muhammad Aufi
- Prithviraj Raso by Chand Bardai
- Tabaqat-i Nasiri by Minhaj-i Siraj Juzjani

Very few known Indian texts recording history before 15th century C.E. exist, hence, historical evidence for much of India's history comes through foreign historians. There is very little evidence of a native historiographical tradition in ancient India. Al-Biruni stated the following about local Indian histriography:

"Unfortunately the Hindus do not pay much attention to the historical order of things, they are very careless in relating the chronological succession of their kings, and when they are pressed for information and are at a loss, not knowing what to say, they invariably take to tale-telling. But for this, we should communicate to the readers the traditions which we have received from some people among them."

— Al-Biruni, Kitāb al-Hind

Ancient India never developed a strong historiographical tradition comparable to the ones that existed in the Greco-Roman, Chinese, and Islamic civilizations. However, it cannot be concluded that the ancient Indians lacked an understanding of objective historical writing, as there were some attempts akin to historiography. At various points in Indian history, there were efforts to record and chronicle the reigns of particular dynasties and rulers in India. Within the Vedic, Buddhist, Jain and other religious literature, the names of teachers are attentively recorded. The Chinese Buddhist pilgrim Xuanzang mentioned that in every province of India, there would be officials who would be responsible for documenting in-writing "good and evil events, calamities, and fortunate occurrences". Since the era of the Gupta ruler Samudragupta, ancient Indian rulers would have a renowned poet record their reigns and victories onto stone in the form of inscription. Romila Thapar instead states that it should be taken into account what the ancient Indians found relevant and why when evaluating any dearth of historiographical tradition. A. K. Warder opined that the regional historiographies of India must be considered, with historical writing in India becoming regionalized by the mediaeval-period from the 7th century onwards. There are historical works authored by the Chalukya, Rashtrakuta, Pala dynastical historiographies and also regional historiographical traditions in Kashmir, Sindhu, Gurjara, Jejakabhukti, Kamarupa, Kerala, Hoyasala, Andhra, Kalinga, and Maharashtra.

In modern-times, some attempts have been made to extract historiographical elements from Vedic literature and epic poetry, such as the Mahabharata or Ramayana. However, religious, mythical, and allegorical legends are too intermixed with Indic religious thought and philosophy that discerning and extracting any semblance of historiography from them is a difficult task. The Puranas mostly entail mythological elements with a facade of historicity. The corpuses of Pali and Prakrit literature of the era are mostly religious in nature. Thus, a historiographical tradition was not popular in India, barring a few examples. A true tradition of historiography was introduced to India after the Arabs captured Sindh, where they introduced history-writing and recording proper chronology. These Arab historiographers were later surmounted by historiographers who wrote in Persian, many of whom were sponsored by the ruling sultans of India.

== Main schools ==
=== Orientalist approach ===
The Orientalist approach was influenced both by imperialist attitudes and interests, and also fascination for the "exotic" East for Mediterranean and European writers and thinkers, captured in images by artists, that is embodied in a repeatedly-surfacing theme in the history of ideas in the West, called "Orientalism".

In art history, literature, and cultural studies, Orientalism is the imitation or depiction of aspects in the Eastern world. These depictions are usually done by writers, designers, and artists from the Western world. The term Orientalism has come to acquire negative connotations in some quarters and is interpreted to refer to the study of the East by Westerners shaped by the attitudes of the era of European imperialism in the 18th and 19th centuries. When used in this sense, it often implies prejudiced, outsider-caricatured interpretations of Eastern cultures and peoples. This viewpoint was most famously articulated and propagated by Edward Said in Orientalism (1978), a critical history of this scholarly tradition.

==== History ====
Though there has been study of India from a western perspective since ancient times, the orientalist school gained prominence in the aftermath of the Age of Discovery.

In the 18th and 19th centuries, the term Orientalist identified a scholar who specialized in the languages and literatures of the Eastern world. Among such scholars were officials of the East India Company, who said that the Arab culture, the Indian culture, and the Islamic cultures should be studied as equal to the cultures of Europe. Among such scholars is the philologist William Jones, whose studies of Indo-European languages established modern philology. Company rule in India favored Orientalism as a technique for developing and maintaining positive relations with the Indians—until the 1820s, when the influence of "anglicists" such as Thomas Babington Macaulay and John Stuart Mill led to the promotion of a Western-style education.

With a great increase in knowledge of Asia among Western specialists, increasing political and economic involvement in the region, and in particular the realization of the existence of close relations between Indian and European languages, by William Jones, there emerged more complex intellectual connections between the early history of Eastern and Western cultures. Some of these developments occurred in the context of Franco–British rivalry for control of India. Liberal economists, such as James Mill, denigrated Eastern civilizations as static and corrupt. Karl Marx characterized the Asiatic mode of production as unchanging, because of the economic narrowness of village economies and the State's role in production. "Oriental despotism" was generally regarded in Europe as a major factor in the relative failure of progress of Eastern societies.

In the course of the century Western archaeology spread across the Middle East and Asia. New national museums provided a setting for important archaeological finds, most of which were in this period bought back to Europe.

The first serious European studies of Buddhism and Hinduism were by the scholars Eugene Burnouf and Max Müller. In that time, the academic study of Islam also developed, and, by the mid-19th century, Oriental Studies was a well-established academic discipline in most European countries, especially those with imperial interests in the region. Yet, while scholastic study expanded, so did racist attitudes and stereotypes of Asian peoples and cultures. Scholarship often was intertwined with prejudicial racist and religious presumptions, to which the new biological sciences tended to contribute until the end of the Second World War.

==== Criticism and Decline ====
In his book Orientalism (1978), cultural critic Edward Said redefines the term Orientalism to describe a pervasive Western tradition—academic and artistic—of prejudiced outsider-interpretations of the Eastern world, which was shaped by the cultural attitudes of European imperialism in the 18th and 19th centuries. Since its publication, most academic discourse began to use the term "Orientalism" to refer to a general patronizing Western attitude towards Middle Eastern, Asian, and North African societies. In Said's analysis, the West essentializes these societies as static and undeveloped—thereby fabricating a view of Oriental culture that can be studied, depicted, and reproduced in the service of imperial power. Implicit in this fabrication, writes Said, is the idea that Western society is developed, rational, flexible, and superior. Furthermore, Said said that "The idea of representation is a theatrical one: the Orient is the stage on which the whole East is confined", and that the subject of learned Orientalists "is not so much the East itself as the East made known, and therefore less fearsome, to the Western reading public".

The thesis of Edward Said's Orientalism develops Marxist philosopher Antonio Gramsci's theory of cultural hegemony, and Michel Foucault's theorisation of discourse (the knowledge-power relation) to criticise the scholarly tradition of Oriental studies.

In the academy, the book Orientalism (1978) became a foundational text of post-colonial cultural studies.

The once common "Orientalist" approach, with its image of a sensuous, inscrutable, and wholly spiritual India, has died out in serious scholarship.

=== Cambridge School ===
The Cambridge School of historiography was a school of thought which approached the study of the British Empire from the imperialist point of view. It emerged especially at the University of Cambridge in the 1960s. John Andrew Gallagher (1919–80) was especially influential, particularly in his article with Ronald Robinson on "The Imperialism of Free Trade". It was led by Anil Seal, Gordon Johnson, Richard Gordon, and David A. Washbrook. It downplayed ideology.

==== Criticism ====
This school of historiography is criticised for western bias or Eurocentrism.

Critics have attacked various ideas of the School. In The New Imperial Histories Reader, Stephen Howe has assembled articles by critics who take aim especially at P. J. Marshall, D. K. Fieldhouse, Robinson and Gallagher, and Peter Cain and A. G. Hopkins.

Howard Spodek, for example, praises the school's regional and pluralist perspectives but criticizes their reliance on British (rather than Indian) documentation, sloppy use of social science models, downplaying of ideology, and their excessive emphasis on Indian self-seeking and the importance of British imperial initiatives in achieving modernization. He recommends a deeper appreciation of Indian initiatives, and more attention to the emerging importance of public life in many areas of society rather than just a concentration on politics.

=== Nationalist School ===
The Nationalist school originated among Indian historians in the late 19th and early 20th centuries who were influenced by Indian nationalism. They emphasized achievements in Indian history, while downplaying negative aspects, which led to various contradictions. Nationalist historians universally praised Hindu rule of India, with Hindu culture being prized above all else. In modern history, they focused on Congress, Gandhi, Nehru and high level politics. It highlighted the Mutiny of 1857 as a war of liberation, and Gandhi's 'Quit India' begun in 1942, as defining historical events. This school of historiography has received criticism for Elitism. Historians in this school included Rajendralal Mitra, R. G. Bhandarkar, Romesh Chunder Dutt, Anant Sadashiv Altekar, K. P. Jayaswal, Hem Chandra Raychaudhuri, Radha Kumud Mukherjee, R. C. Majumdar, and K. A. Nilakanta Sastri ,.

=== Marxist School ===
In India, Marxist Historiography takes the form of Marxian historiography where Marxian techniques of analysis are used but Marxist political intentions and prescriptions are discarded. The Marxian historiography of India uses the method of historical materialism and has focused on studies of economic development, land ownership, and class conflict in precolonial India and deindustrialization during the colonial period.

B. N. Datta, and D. D. Kosambi are considered the founding fathers of Marxist historiography in India. D. D. Kosambi was apologetic of the revolution of Mao and thought of Indian Prime Minister Jawaharlal Nehru's policies as pro-capitalist. Kosambi, a polymath, viewed Indian History from a Marxist viewpoint. The other Indian scholars of Marxian historiography are R. S. Sharma, Irfan Habib, D. N. Jha, and K. N. Panikkar. Other historians such as Satish Chandra, Romila Thapar, Bipan Chandra, Arjun Dev, and Dineshchandra Sircar, are sometimes referred to as "influenced by the Marxian approach to history."

One debate in Indian history that relates to a historical materialist schema is on the nature of feudalism in India. D. D. Kosambi in the 1960s outlined the idea of "feudalism from below" and "feudalism from above". Element of his feudalism thesis was rejected by R.S. Sharma in his monograph Indian Feudalism (2005) and various other books, However R. S. Sharma also largely agrees with Kosambi in his various other books. Most Indian Marxian historians argue that the economic origins of communalism are feudal remnants and the economic insecurities caused by slow development in India.

Even non-academic and laymen contributions to Marxist Historiography exist in India. The book "Coffee Housinte Katha" (The Story of Coffee House), written in Malayalam, a regional language of India, spoken in the state of Kerala, by one of the leaders of the Indian Coffee House Movement, Nadakkal Parameswaran Pillai, is an example of this. Politicians like Shripad Amrit Dange have also contributed to Marxian historiography.

==== Criticism ====
The Marxian school of Indian historiography is accused of being too ideologically influenced. Though influenced by Marxist theory B. R. Ambedkar criticized Marxists, as he deemed them to be unaware or ignorant of the specifics of caste issues. Also though most criticisms of Marxian historiography is levied by people who are not historians, some historians have debated Marxian historians and critically examined their analysis of the history of India.

Many have alleged that Marxian historians used negationism to whitewash some of the atrocities committed by Muslim rulers in the Indian Subcontinent. Since the late 1990s, Hindu nationalist scholars especially have theorized that the Marxian tradition in India neglected what they believe to be the country's 'illustrious past' based on Vedic-puranic chronology and other pseudo-historical revisionist narratives of history, the historians are held responsible for aiding or defending Muslims, who figure in Hindu nationalist discourse as the enemy. An example of such a view is Arun Shourie's Eminent Historians (1998) and Flawed Narratives: History in the old NCERT Textbooks (2000), by Meenakshi Jain.

=== Subaltern School ===
The "subaltern school", was begun in the 1980s by Ranajit Guha and Gyan Prakash. It focuses attention away from the elites and politicians to "history from below", looking at the peasants using folklore, poetry, riddles, proverbs, songs, oral history and methods inspired by anthropology. It focuses on the colonial era before 1947 and typically emphasises caste and downplays class, to the annoyance of the Marxist school.

=== Hindutva Approach ===
Hindutva (transl. Hinduness) is the predominant form of Hindu nationalism in India. The Hindutva movement has been described as a variant of "right-wing extremism", adhering to a concept of homogenised majority and cultural hegemony. Some analysts dispute the identification of Hindutva with fascism, and suggest Hindutva is an extreme form of conservatism.

Hindutva approach to history exists to create a version of history to support the Hindu nationalist demands for Hindu Rashtra in Indian society. It began with the writings of the developer and outliner of the Hindu Nationalist political ideology of Hindutva himself, Vinayak Damodar Savarkar. His works 'The Indian war of independence, 1857', 'Hindu-Pad-Padashahi (A Critical Review of the Hindu Empire of Maharashtra)', and 'Six Glorious Epochs of Indian History' contributed to and laid down the groundwork for this approach. However, this approach did not gain much traction until the 1990s.

This approach is still in the process of development. In March 2012, Diana L. Eck, Professor of Comparative Religion and Indian Studies at Harvard University, authored in her book "India: A Sacred Geography", that idea of India dates to a much earlier time than the British or the Mughals and it wasn't just a cluster of regional identities and it wasn't ethnic or racial.

This approach is noted for denying the Indo-Aryan migrations, as they consider those whose ancestry and religion have origins outside of the Indian subcontinent to be aliens, namely Muslims, Christians, and communists. This approach states that only the Hindus are the legitimate heirs of South Asia.

==== Saffronisation ====
Saffronisation, a process of introduction of right-wing policies that implement a Hindu nationalist agenda onto school textbooks by attempting to glorify Hindu contributions to Indian history while undermining other contributions, has become prominent. The Bharatiya Janata Party (BJP) has said that several Indian history textbooks had overt Marxist or Eurocentric political overtones. The BJP has had trouble changing the textbooks because many states in which the BJP is not in power have blocked saffronisation efforts. The BJP, citing a rigid anti-Hindu agenda, restructured NCERT and the Indian Council of Historical Research (ICHR) to make textbooks conform to the BJP's Hindu nationalist platform. In states where the BJP had control of the local government, textbooks were changed extensively to favor a Hindu nationalist narrative. These changes included the omission of caste-based exclusion and violence throughout Indian history and the exclusion or minimization of contributions to Indian society made by Muslims.

After a rival political party, the Indian National Congress, came into power, efforts were undertaken in 2004 to reverse the saffronisation of textbooks previously made by BJP.

When the Hindustan Times reviewed the issue of saffronisation of Indian textbooks in late 2014, it noted that right-wing efforts to change how textbooks recount history faced "some difficulty as it lacks credible historians to back its claims." The medieval period in India is one such hotly-contested epoch among historians. Since there can be no true consensus about that era due to divided and deeply entrenched political motivations, history for that period is highly subjective and particularly vulnerable to the influence of the textbook writer's sympathies and outlook. "The choice of the textbook writer is more decisive than anything else," it was noted in a report in The Hindu. Critics have said that the changes to the textbooks have portrayed the medieval period as "a dark age of Islamic colonial rule which snuffed out the glories of the Hindu and Buddhist empires that preceded it". Another trap in the politicisation of history relates to contention over the state of Jammu and Kashmir.

By mid-2015, The Times of India reported that the National Council of Educational Research and Training, which is in charge of publishing textbooks, had participated in a meeting convened by the Ministry of Human Resource Development, and during that meeting, the issue of changing textbooks was discussed. An official from the ICHR complained that the theme of nationalism did not receive proper treatment in textbooks, setting the stage for possible textbook revisions.

The state government of Rajasthan reportedly spent Rs 37 crore to reprint 36 textbooks used for classes 1 to 8 for the 2016–2017 academic session that will be based on an agenda that would promote Indian culture by including historical figures, such as Maharaja Surajmal, Hem Chandra, and Guru Gobind Singh. The textbooks that had been approved up to the 2012–13 academic session were rendered obsolete under the rewriting of history, and those books were auctioned off. In total, 5,66 crore new textbooks were ordered printed for an agenda that critics described was intent on supporting the saffronisation of textbooks. Rajasthan (primary and secondary) education minister Vasudev Devnani denied the charge of saffronisation, but educationists described his decision as to the "Hinduisation of education" that occurs when right-wing forces come to power.

The state government of Karnataka has reportedly ordered new textbooks for the 2017–18 academic session in an effort that academicians and critics have described as a "blatant attempt to saffronise textbooks".

==== Criticism ====
The Hindutva approach to history is based on ahistorical premises and treats mythology as history.

According to Christophe Jaffrelot, a French political scientist specialising in South Asia, the Hindutva ideology has roots in an era where the fiction in ancient Indian mythology and Vedic antiquity was presumed to be valid. This fiction was used to "give sustenance to Hindu ethnic consciousness". Its strategy emulated the Muslim identity politics of the Khilafat movement after World War I, and borrowed political concepts from the West – mainly German. Hindutva organizations treat events in Hindu mythology as history. Hindutva organizations have been criticized for their belief in statements or practices that they claim to be both scientific and factual but are incompatible with the scientific method.

According to Anthony Parel, a historian and political scientist, Savarkar's Hindutva, Who is a Hindu? published in 1923 is a fundamental text of Hindutva ideology. It asserts, states Parel, India of the past to be "the creation of a racially superior people, the Aryans. They came to be known to the outside world as Hindus, the people beyond the Indus River. Their identity was created by their race (jati) and their culture (Sanskriti). All Hindus claim to have in their veins the blood of the mighty race incorporated with and descended from the Vedic fathers. They created a culture — an ensemble of mythologies, legends, epic stories, philosophy, art and architecture, laws and rites, feasts, and festivals. They have a special relationship to India: India is to them both fatherland and holy land." The Savarkar's text presents the "Hindu culture as a self-sufficient culture, not needing any input from other cultures", which is "an unhistorical, narcissistic and false account of India's past", states Parel.

The premises of early Hindu nationalist thought, states Chetan Bhatt, reflected the colonial era European scholarship and Orientalism of its times. The idea of "India as the cradle of civilization" (Voltaire, Herder, Kant, Schlegel), or as "humanity's homeland and primal philosophy" (Herder, Schlegel), or the "humanism in Hindu values" (Herder), or of Hinduism offering redemption for contemporary humanity (Schopenhauer), along with the colonial-era scholarship of Frederich Muller, Charles Wilkins, William Jones, Alexander Hamilton, and others were the natural intellectual matrix for Savarkar and others to borrow and germinate their Hindu nationalist ideas.

Chakravarthi Ram-Prasad, a Fellow of the British Academy and a scholar of Politics and Philosophy of Religion, states that Hindutva is a form of nationalism that is expounded differently by its opponents and its proponents. The opponents of Hindutva either consider it as a fundamentalist ideology that "aims to regulate the working of civil society with the imperatives of Hindu religious doctrine", or as another form of fundamentalism while accepting that Hinduism is a diverse collection of doctrines, is complex and is different from other religions. According to Ram-Prasad, the proponents of Hindutva reject these tags, viewing it to be their right and a desirable value to cherish their religious and cultural traditions. The Hindutva ideology according to Savarkar, states Ram-Prasad, is a "geography, race, and culture" based concept. However, the "geography" is not strictly territorial but is an "ancestral homeland of a people", and the "race" is not biogenetic but described as the historic descendants of the intermarriage of Aryans, native inhabitants, and "different peoples" who arrived over time. So, "the ultimate category for Hindutva is culture", and this culture is "not strictly speaking religious if by religion is meant a commitment to certain doctrines of transcendence", he states. The proponents state that in the Hindutva thought, there is a kernel of coherent and justifiable thesis about the Indian culture and history.

Hindutva ideology has been linked to threats to academics and students, both in India and the United States. For instance, in 2011, Hindutva activists successfully led a charge to remove an essay about the multiple narratives of Ramayanas from Delhi University's history syllabus. Romila Thapar, a world-renowned historian, has faced Hindutva-led attacks, with the claims that her works present Marxist and Eurocentric points of view. Hindutva scholars like Rajiv Malhotra has been responsible for pushback against white scholars specialising on South Asia and Hinduism based in North America, including Wendy Doniger and Sheldon Pollock on grounds of their supposed vested interests & racial prejudices against Indians. Under BJP leadership, the Indian state has been accused of monitoring scholars and denying some research access.

In 2021, a group of North American-based scholars of South Asia formed a collective and published the Hindutva Harassment Field Manual to, they argue, answer the Hindutva threat to their academic freedom. They documented further incidents of Hindutva harassment of academics in North America, dating back to the 1990s. The Association for Asian Studies noted that Hindutva, described as a "majoritarian ideological doctrine" different from Hinduism, resorted to "increasing attacks on numerous scholars, artists, and journalists who critically analyze its politics".

== Assessments of the Impact of British imperialism on India ==
Debate continues about the economic impact of British imperialism on India. The issue was actually raised by conservative British politician Edmund Burke who in the 1780s vehemently attacked the East India Company, claiming that Warren Hastings and other top officials had ruined the Indian economy and society. Indian historian Rajat Kanta Ray (1998) continues this line of attack, saying the new economy brought by the British in the 18th century was a form of "plunder" and a catastrophe for the traditional economy of Mughal India. Ray accuses the British of depleting the food and money stocks and imposing high taxes that helped cause the terrible famine of 1770, which killed a third of the people of Bengal.

Rejecting the Indian nationalist account of the British as alien aggressors, seizing power by brute force and impoverishing all of India, British historian P. J. Marshall argues that the British were not in full control but instead were players in what was primarily an Indian play and in which their rise to power depended upon excellent cooperation with Indian elites. Marshall admits that much of his interpretation is still rejected by many historians. Marshall argues that recent scholarship has reinterpreted the view that the prosperity of the formerly benign Mughal rule gave way to poverty and anarchy. Marshall argues the British takeover did not make any sharp break with the past. The British largely delegated control to regional Mughal rulers and sustained a generally prosperous economy for the rest of the 18th century. Marshall notes the British went into partnership with Indian bankers and raised revenue through local tax administrators and kept the old Mughal rates of taxation. Professor Ray agrees that the East India Company inherited an onerous taxation system that took one-third of the produce of Indian cultivators.

=== Insecurity of the Raj ===
In the 20th century historians generally agreed that imperial authority in the Raj had been secure in the 1800–1940 era. Various challenges have emerged. Mark Condos and Jon Wilson argue that the Raj was chronically insecure. They argue that the irrational anxiety of officials led to a chaotic administration with minimal social purchase or ideological coherence. The Raj was not a confident state capable of acting as it chose, but rather a psychologically embattled one incapable of acting except in the abstract, the small scale, or short term.

== See also ==
- Muslim chronicles for Indian history
- History of India
- Historiography of the British Empire

== Bibliography ==
- Balagangadhara, S. N. (2012). Reconceptualizing India studies. New Delhi: Oxford University Press.
- Bhattacharjee, J. B. Historians and Historiography of North East India (2012)
- Bannerjee, Dr. Gauranganath (1921). India as known to the ancient world. Humphrey Milford, Oxford University Press, London.
- Bose, Mihir. "India's Missing Historians: Mihir Bose Discusses the Paradox That India, a Land of History, Has a Surprisingly Weak Tradition of Historiography", History Today 57#9 (2007) pp 34+. online
- Chakrabarti, Dilip K.: Colonial Indology, 1997, Munshiram Manoharlal: New Delhi.
- Palit, Chittabrata, Indian Historiography (2008).
- Indian History and Culture Society., Devahuti, D. (2012). Bias in Indian historiography.
- Elliot, Henry Miers; John Dowson (1867–77). The History of India, as told by its own historians. The Muhammadan Period. London: Trübner and Co.
- Jain, Meenakshi Flawed Narratives: History in the old NCERT Textbooks - A random survey of Satish Chandra’s “Medieval India, NCERT 2000
- Inden, R. B. (2010). Imagining India. Bloomington, Ind: Indiana University Press.
- Jain, M. The India They Saw : Foreign Accounts (4 Volumes) Delhi: Ocean Books, 2011.
- Kahn, Yasmin. "Remembering and Forgetting: South Asia and the Second World War' in Martin Gegner and Bart Ziino, eds., The Heritage of War (Routledge, 2011) pp 177–193.
- Mantena, R. (2016). Origins of modern historiography in India: Antiquarianism and philology 1780–1880. Palgrave Macmillan.
- Mittal, S. C India distorted: A study of British historians on India (1995), on 19th century writers
- R. C. Majumdar, Historiography in Modern India (Bombay, 1970) ISBN 9782102227356
- Rosser, Yvette Claire (2003). Curriculum as Destiny: Forging National Identity in India, Pakistan, and Bangladesh (PDF) (Dissertation). University of Texas at Austin. Archived from the original (PDF) on 11 September 2008.
- Arvind Sharma, Hinduism and Its Sense of History (Oxford University Press, 2003) ISBN 978-0-19-566531-4
- E. Sreedharan, A Textbook of Historiography, 500 B.C. to A.D. 2000 (2004)
- Shourie, Arun (2014). Eminent historians: Their technology, their line, their fraud. Noida, Uttar Pradesh, India : HarperCollins Publishers. ISBN 9789351365914
- Trautmann, Thomas R. (1997). Aryans and British India. Berkeley: University of California Press. ISBN 978-0-585-10445-4.
- Viswanathan, G. (2015). Masks of conquest: Literary study and British rule in India.
- Antonio de Nicolas, Krishnan Ramaswamy, and Aditi Banerjee (eds.) (2007), Invading the Sacred: An Analysis Of Hinduism Studies in America (Publisher: Rupa & Co.)
- Vishwa Adluri, Joydeep Bagchee: The Nay Science: A History of German Indology. Oxford University Press, New York 2014, ISBN 978-0199931361 (Introduction, p. 1–29).
- Warder, A. K., An introduction to Indian historiography (1972).
- Winks, Robin, ed. The Oxford History of the British Empire: Volume V: Historiography (2001)
- Weickgenannt, T. N. (2009). Salman Rushdie and Indian historiography: Writing the nation into being. Basingstoke: Palgrave Macmillan.
