= Imperialism (Hobson book) =

1902 book by John A. Hobson

Imperialism: A Study
- Author: J.A. Hobson
- Language: English
- Publication date: 1902
- Publication place: United Kingdom
- OCLC: 63269928

Imperialism: A Study (1902), by John A. Hobson, is a politico-economic discourse about the negative financial, economic, and moral aspects of imperialism as a nationalistic business enterprise. Hobson argues that capitalist business activity brought about imperialism.

== The taproot of Imperialism ==
Hobson states that what he called "the taproot of imperialism" is not in nationalist pride, but in capitalist oligarchy; and, as a form of economic organization, imperialism is unnecessary and immoral, the result of the mis-distribution of wealth in a capitalist society. He argues that the so-called dysfunction of the political economy created the socio-cultural desire to extend the national markets into foreign lands, in search of profits greater than those available in the Mother Country. In the capitalist economy, rich capitalists received a disproportionately higher income than did the working class. He argues that if the owners invested their incomes to their factories, the greatly increased productive capacity would exceed the growth in demand for the products and services of said factories.

When productive capacity grew faster than consumer demand, there was very soon an excess of this capacity (relative to consumer demand), and, hence, there were few profitable domestic investment outlets. Foreign investment was the only answer. But, insofar as the same problem existed in every industrialized capitalist country, such foreign investment was possible only if non-capitalist countries could be "civilized", "Christianized", and "uplifted"—that is, if their traditional institutions could be forcefully destroyed, and the people coercively brought under the domain of the "invisible hand" of market capitalism. So, imperialism was the only answer.

— E.K. Hunt, History of Economic Thought, 2nd ed. page 355.

As a political scientist, J.A. Hobson said that imperialism was an economic, political, and cultural practice common to nations with a capitalist economic system. Because of its innate productive capacity for generating profits, capitalism did not functionally require a large-scale, large-term, and costly socio-economic enterprise such as imperialism. A capitalist society could avoid resorting to imperialism through the radical re-distribution of the national economic resources among the society, and so increase the economic-consumption power of every citizen. After said economic adjustments, a capitalist nation did not require opening new foreign markets, and so could profitably direct the production and consumption of goods and services to the in-country markets, because "the home markets are capable of indefinite expansion . . . provided that the 'income', or power to demand commodities, is properly distributed."

== Influence and criticism ==
Imperialism: A Study (1902) established Hobson's international reputation in political science. His geopolitical propositions influenced the work of prominent figures such as Nikolai Bukharin, Vladimir Lenin, and Hannah Arendt. The book was one of the most influential books of the 20th century.

=== Influence on Marxism ===
In particular, Lenin drew much from Imperialism: A Study to support and substantiate Imperialism, the Highest Stage of Capitalism (1916), which then was a contemporary, war-time analysis of the geopolitical crises of the imperial empires of Europe that culminated in the First World War (1914–1918). Lenin said that Karl Kautsky had taken the idea of ultra-imperialism from the work of J.A. Hobson, and that:

Ultra-imperialism, or super-imperialism, [was] what Hobson, thirteen years earlier, [had] described as inter-imperialism. Except for coining a new and clever catch-word, replacing one Latin prefix by another, the only progress [that] Kautsky has made, in the sphere of 'scientific' thought, is that he gave out, as Marxism, what Hobson, in effect, [had] described as the cant of English parsons.

Moreover, Lenin ideologically disagreed with Hobson's opinion that capitalism, as an economic system, could be separated from imperialism; instead, he proposed that, because of the economic competitions that had provoked the First World War, capitalism had come to its end as a functional socio-economic system, and that it would be replaced by pacifist socialism, in order for imperialism to end. Nevertheless, Hobson's influence in Lenin's writings became orthodoxy for all Marxist historians.

=== Influence on liberalism ===
Hobson was also influential in liberal circles, especially the Liberal Party. Hobson's theory of Imperialism has had many critics. Contemporary historian D. K. Fieldhouse, for example, argues that the arguments used are ultimately superficial. Fieldhouse says that the "obvious driving force of British expansion since 1870" came from explorers, missionaries, engineers, and empire-minded politicians. They had little interest in financial investments. Hobson's answer would be to say that faceless financiers manipulated everyone else, so that "The final determination rests with the financial power." Lenin believed that capitalism was in its last stages and had been taken over by monopolists. They were no longer dynamic and sought to maintain profits by even more intensive exploitation of protected markets. Fieldhouse rejects these arguments as unfounded speculation.

Historians Peter Duignan and Lewis H. Gann argue that Hobson had an enormous influence in the early 20th century among people from all over the world:

Hobson's ideas were not entirely original; however his hatred of moneyed men and monopolies, his loathing of secret compacts and public bluster, fused all existing indictments of imperialism into one coherent system....His ideas influenced German nationalist opponents of the British Empire as well as French Anglophobes and Marxists; they colored the thoughts of American liberals and isolationist critics of colonialism. In days to come they were to contribute to American distrust of Western Europe and of the British Empire. Hobson helped make the British averse to the exercise of colonial rule; he provided indigenous nationalists in Asia and Africa with the ammunition to resist rule from Europe.

After 1950, Hobson's technical interpretations came under sharp criticism by scholars. His contention that economics underpinned imperialism was attacked by the historians John Gallagher and Ronald Robinson in their 1953 article "The Imperialism of Free Trade" which argued that strategic considerations and geopolitics underpinned European expansion in the 19th century.

=== "Jewish financiers" and racism ===
Hobson's writings on the Second Boer War, particularly in a different book, The War in South Africa: Its Causes and Effects, attribute the war partly to Jewish influence, including references to Rothschild bankers. While Imperialism does not contain the "violent anti-Jewish crudities" of his earlier writing, it does contain an allusion to the power and influence of Jewish financiers, saying that finance was controlled "by men of a single and peculiar race, who have behind them many centuries of financial experience" and "are in a unique position to control the policy of nations". According to Norman Etherington, this section on financiers seems irrelevant to Hobson's economic discourse, and was probably included since Hobson truly believed it. According to Hugh Stretton:

A final attraction of Hobson's explanation of imperialism was its deft choice of scape- goats.... The ideal scapegoats should be few, foreign connected, readily recognizable and already disliked.

Hobson believed "colonial primitive peoples" were inferior, writing in Imperialism he advocated their "gradual elimination" by an international organization: "A rational stirpiculture in the wide social interest might, however, require a repression of the spread of degenerate or unprogressive races". While it can be said the 1902 work reflected the Social Darwinism trend of the time, Hobson left this section mainly unchanged when he published the third edition in 1938. The British Labour Party leader Jeremy Corbyn wrote a foreword for the 2011 edition, calling Hobson's "analysis of the pressures that were hard at work in pushing for a vast national effort in grabbing new outposts of Empire on distant islands and shores" brilliant. In a strongly worded letter, the Board of Deputies of British Jews expressed “grave concerns” about the emergence of the foreword. Corbyn stated that he did not endorse anti-semitism, saying this was a "mischievous representation".

== See also ==
- Imperialism
- Imperialism, the Highest Stage of Capitalism
- Leninism
- Theories of New Imperialism
- World-systems theory
