= Egypt–United Kingdom relations =

- Egypt: United Kingdom

Egypt and the United Kingdom maintain longstanding diplomatic, economic, and cultural relationships. They involve politics, defence, trade and education, and especially issues regarding the Suez Canal.

== History ==
=== Early Commercial and Strategic Contact ===
British interaction with Egypt in the late 17th and early 18th centuries was largely commercial, mediated through the Levant Company in Aleppo, Smyrna, and Alexandria. Commerce included grain and textiles, some luxury goods, and the critical overland trade route connecting the Mediterranean to the Red Sea leading toward India.

=== Napoleonic Era ===
Great Britain later help assist Egyptian force during the French occupation of Egypt and Syria.

Britain's geopolitical military strategy sought to control Egypt to counteract French influence and safeguard access to India, ultimately resulting in failure and the restoration of Ottoman-Egyptian authority.

=== British rule ===
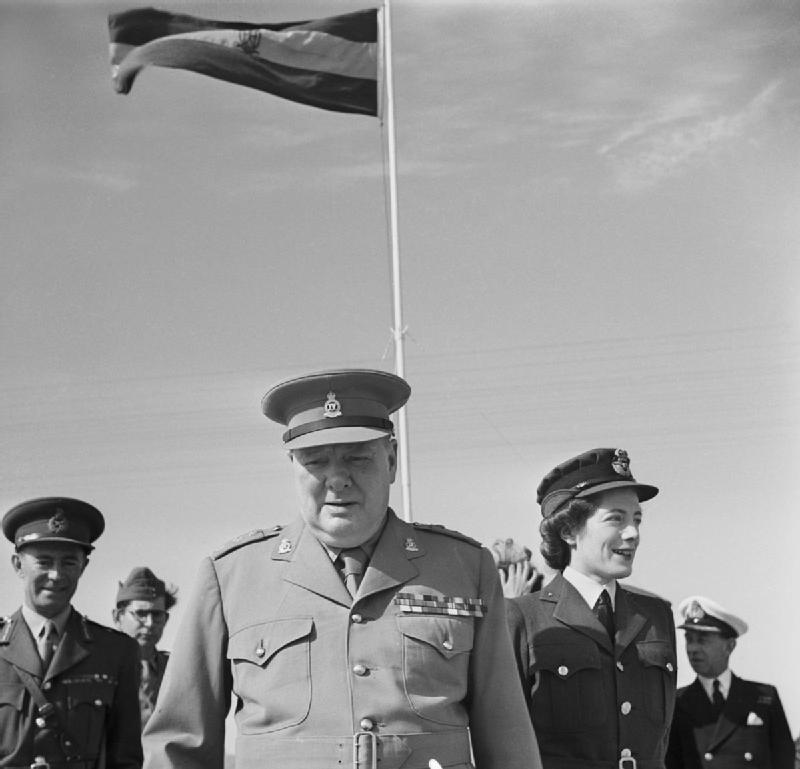
Churchill visits his old regiment during the Cairo Conference, Egypt, December 1943

The first period of British rule (1882–1914) was the "veiled protectorate". During this time the Khedivate of Egypt remained an autonomous province of the Ottoman Empire. In reality the British made all the decisions and thus had a de facto protectorate over the country. This state of affairs lasted until the Ottoman Empire joined the First World War on the side of the Central Powers in November 1914 and Britain unilaterally declared a protectorate over Egypt. The Ottomans thereby lost all connections. The ruling khedive was deposed and his successor, Hussein Kamel, was compelled to declare himself Sultan of Egypt independent of the Ottomans in December 1914.

==== Seizure of Egypt, 1882 ====
As co-owners of the Suez Canal, both British and French governments had strong interests in the stability of Egypt. Over two-thirds of the traffic was by British merchant ships and it was the gateway to India and the Far East. However, in 1881 the ʻUrabi revolt broke out—it was a nationalist movement led by Ahmed ʻUrabi (1841–1911) against the administration of Khedive Tewfik, who collaborated closely with the British and French. Combined with the complete turmoil in Egyptian finances, the threat to the Suez Canal, and embarrassment to British prestige if it could not handle a revolt, London found the situation intolerable and decided to end it by force. The French, however, did not join in. On 11 July 1882, Gladstone ordered the bombardment of Alexandria which launched the short decisive short, Anglo-Egyptian War of 1882. Egypt nominally remained under the sovereignty of the Ottoman Empire, and France and other nations had representation, but British officials made the decisions. The dominant personality was Evelyn Baring, 1st Earl of Cromer. He was thoroughly familiar with the British Raj in India, and applied similar policies to take full control of the Egyptian economy. London 66 times promised to depart in a few years; the actual result was British control of Egypt for four decades, largely ignoring the Ottoman Empire.

Historian A.J.P. Taylor says that the seizure of Egypt "was a great event; indeed, the only real event in international relations between the Battle of Sedan and the defeat of Russia in the Russo-Japanese war." Taylor emphasizes long-term impact:

The British occupation of Egypt altered the balance of power. It not only gave the British security for their route to India, it made them masters of the Eastern Mediterranean and the Middle East. It made it unnecessary for them to stand in the front line against Russia at the Straits....And thus prepared the way for the Franco-Russian Alliance ten years later.

Gladstone and the Liberals had a reputation for strong opposition to imperialism, so historians have long debated the explanation for this reversal of policy. The most influential was a study by John Robinson and Ronald Gallagher, Africa and the Victorians (1961). They focused on The Imperialism of Free Trade and promoted the highly influential Cambridge School of historiography. They argue there was no long-term Liberal plan in support of imperialism. Instead they saw the urgent necessity to act to protect the Suez Canal in the face of what appeared to be a radical collapse of law and order, and a nationalist revolt focused on expelling the Europeans, regardless of the damage it would do to international trade and the British Empire. Gladstone's decision came against strained relations with France, and maneuvering by "men on the spot" in Egypt. Critics such as Cain and Hopkins have stressed the need to protect large sums invested by British financiers and Egyptian bonds, while downplaying the risk to the viability of the Suez Canal. Unlike the Marxists, they stress "gentlemanly" financial and commercial interests, not the industrial capitalism that Marxists believe was always central.

A.G. Hopkins rejected Robinson and Gallagher's argument, citing original documents to claim that there was no perceived danger to the Suez Canal from the ‘Urabi movement, and that ‘Urabi and his forces were not chaotic "anarchists", but rather maintained law and order. He alternatively argues that Gladstone's cabinet was motivated by protecting the interests of British bondholders with investments in Egypt as well as by pursuit of domestic political popularity. Hopkins cites the British investments in Egypt that grew massively leading into the 1880s, partially as a result of the Khedive's debt from construction of the Suez Canal, as well as the close links that existed between the British government and the economic sector. He writes that Britain's economic interests occurred simultaneously with a desire within one element of the ruling Liberal Party for a militant foreign policy in order to gain the domestic political popularity that enabled it to compete with the Conservative Party. Hopkins cites a letter from Edward Malet, the British consul general in Egypt at the time, to a member of the Gladstone Cabinet offering his congratulations on the invasion: "You have fought the battle of all Christendom and history will acknowledge it. May I also venture to say that it has given the Liberal Party a new lease of popularity and power." However, Dan Halvorson argues that the protection of the Suez Canal and British financial and trade interests were secondary and derivative. Instead, the primary motivation was the vindication of British prestige in both Europe and especially in India by suppressing the threat to “civilised” order posed by the Urabist revolt.

=== Egyptian independence ===
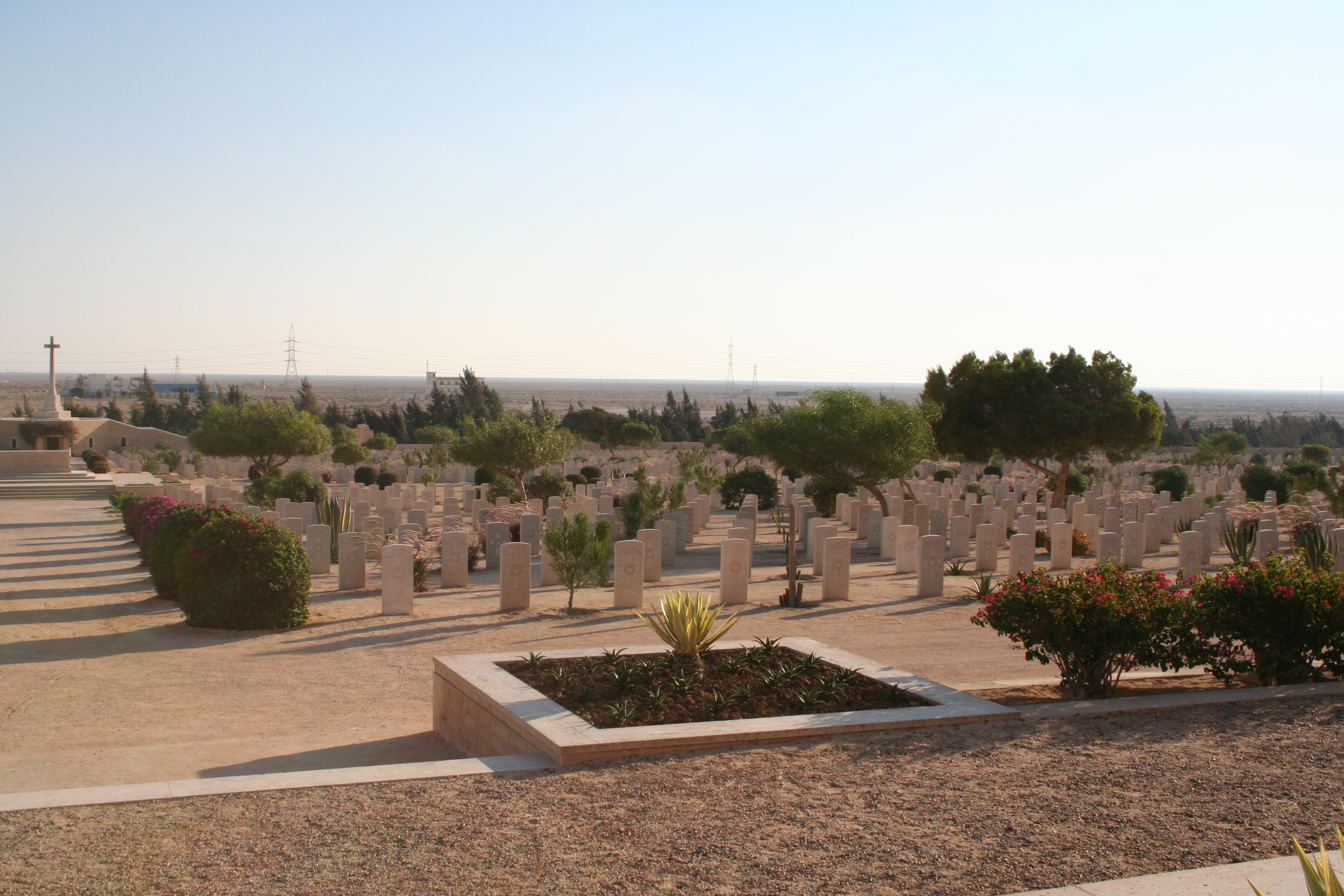
El Alamein Commonwealth Cemetery

In December 1921, the British authorities in Cairo imposed martial law and once again deported Zaghlul. Demonstrations again led to violence. In deference to the growing nationalism and at the suggestion of the High Commissioner, Lord Allenby, the UK unilaterally declared Egyptian independence on 28 February 1922, abolishing the protectorate and establishing an independent Kingdom of Egypt. Until the Anglo-Egyptian treaty of 1936, the Kingdom was only nominally independent, since the British retained control of foreign relations, communications, the military and the Anglo-Egyptian Sudan. Between 1936 and 1952, the British continued to maintain military presence and political advisors, at a reduced level.

During World War II, British troops used Egypt as a major base for Allied operations throughout the region. Egypt was nominally neutral in the war. However, 1942 military coup have severely damaged mutual trust the Egypt-Britain's future relationship.

British troops were withdrawn to the Suez Canal area in 1947, but nationalist, anti-British feelings continued to grow after the war. The Egyptian Revolution of 1952 overthrew the Egyptian monarchy, eliminated the British military presence in Egypt, and established the modern Republic of Egypt.

=== Suez Crisis of 1956 ===
In 1956, Egyptian president Gamal Abdel Nasser nationalized the Suez Canal, a vital waterway through which most of Europe's oil arrived from the Middle East. Britain and France, in league with Israel, invaded to seize the canal and overthrow Nasser. The United States, led by President Dwight D. Eisenhower, strenuously objected, using diplomatic and financial pressure to force the three invaders to withdraw. Prime Minister Anthony Eden was humiliated and soon resigned. Thorpe summarized the unexpected results:

Eden's policy had four main aims: first, to secure the Suez Canal; second and consequently, to ensure continuity of oil supplies; third, to remove Nasser; and fourth, to keep the Russians out of the Middle East. The immediate consequence of the crisis was that the Suez Canal was blocked, oil supplies were interrupted, Nasser's position as the leader of Arab nationalism was strengthened, and the way was left open for Russian intrusion into the Middle East. It was a truly tragic end to his premiership, and one that came to assume a disproportionate importance in any assessment of his career."

=== Modern relations ===
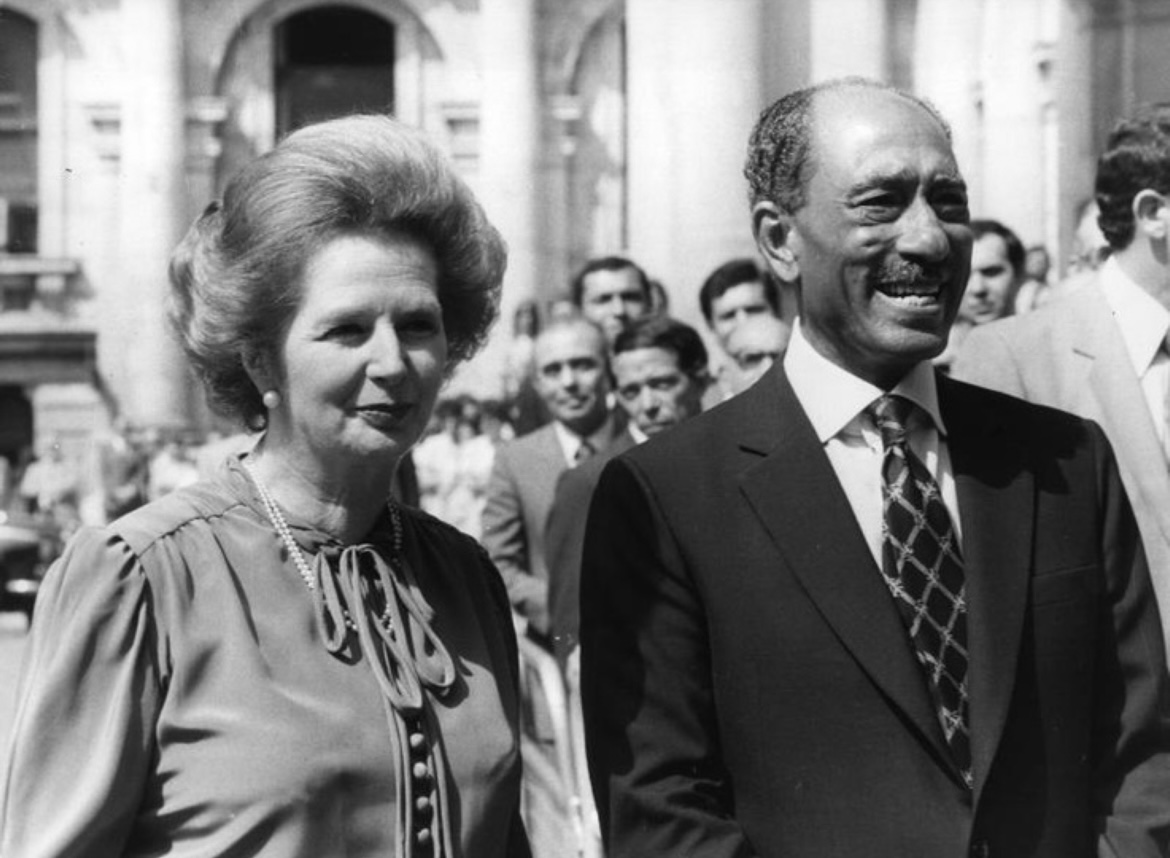
British Prime Minister Margaret Thatcher meeting Egyptian President Anwar Sadat in London, 1981

In the following decades, bilateral relations gradually improved. Under President Anwar Sadat, Egypt turned toward the West in the 1970s, which was welcomed in London—the British government supported the Egyptian-Israeli peace agreement initiated by Sadat in 1979. During the tenure of Hosni Mubarak (1981–2011), there was close cooperation, for example in the context of the alliance against the Iraqi invasion of Kuwait in 1990/91 and in the war on terrorism in the 2000s.

In August 2025, Egyptian Foreign Minister Badr Abdelatty held a phone call with British National Security Adviser Jonathan Powell to discuss the arrest of an Egyptian citizen in London. Abdelatty instructed the Egyptian Embassy in London to contact the relevant UK authorities to clarify the conditions of the citizen's detention.

In July 2025, Cairo and London agreed to elevate their bilateral relations to the level of a strategic partnership to further deepen cooperation in areas such as the economy, security, and migration.

== Economic relations ==
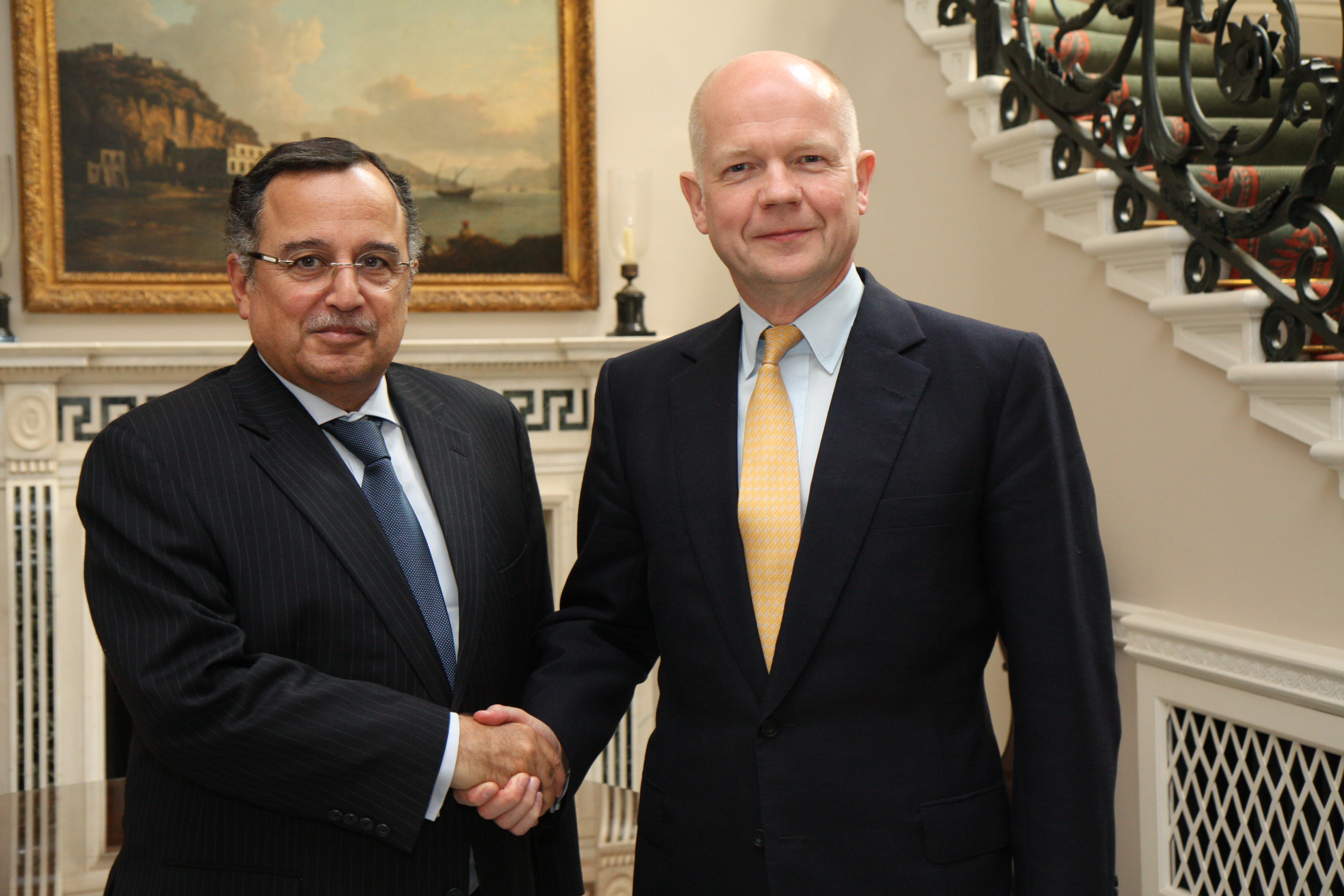
British Foreign Secretary William Hague meeting former Egyptian Foreign Minister Nabil Fahmy in London, May 2014.

In late 2014, the Egyptian-British Chamber of Commerce (EBCC) released a report detailing the trade volume between the two countries, which increased significantly that year. British exports to Egypt grew by 15%, while Egyptian exports to the UK grew by over 30%. The UK is the largest investor into the Egyptian economy, accounting for 41.3% of total foreign direct investment. The New Suez Canal project and Egypt's economic recovery following three years of turmoil since the 2011 uprising are contributing factors to this achievement.

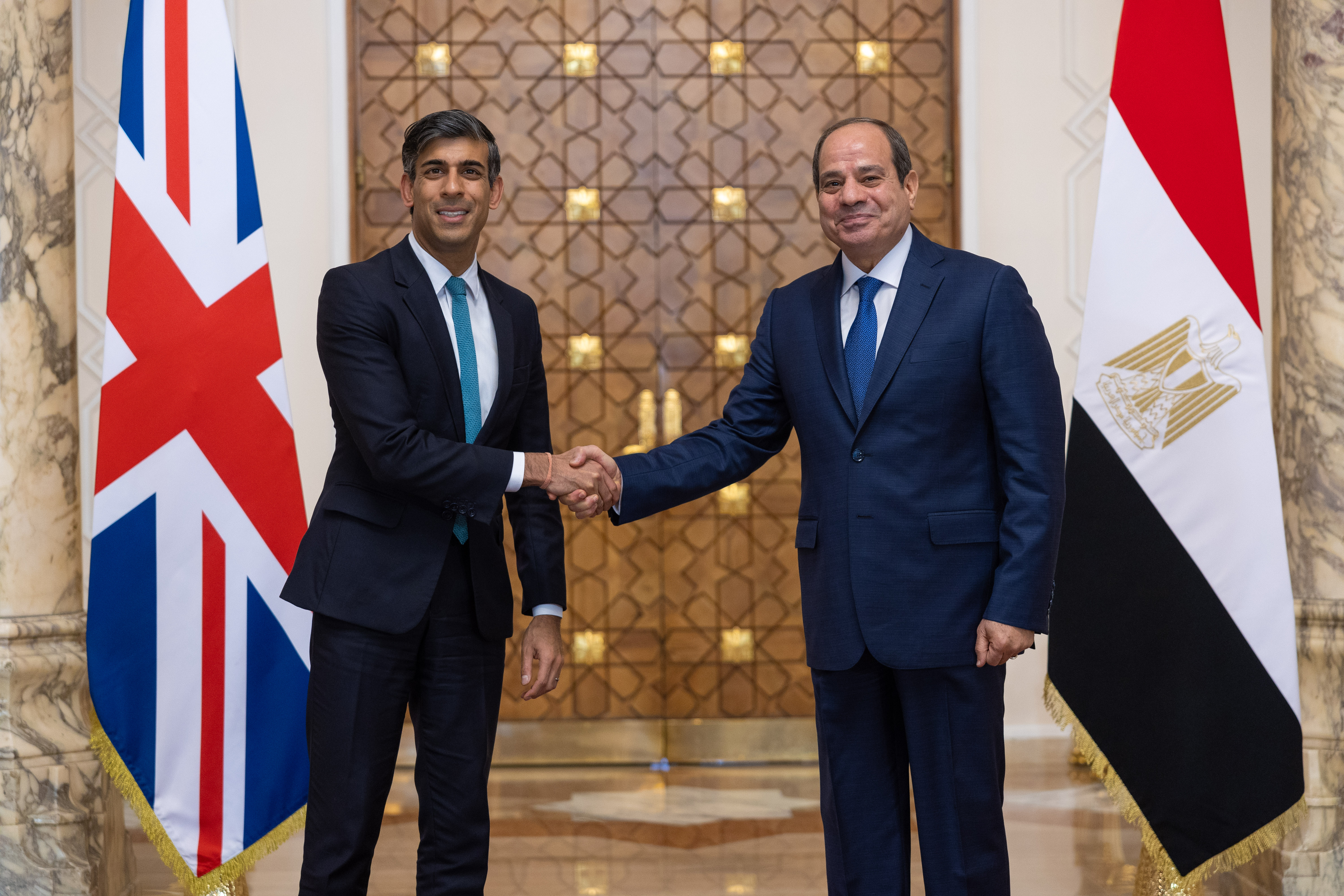
British Prime Minister Rishi Sunak with Egyptian President Abdel Fattah al-Sisi in Cairo, 20 October 2023

From 1 June 2004 until 30 December 2020, trade between Egypt and the UK was governed by the Egypt–European Union Association Agreement, while the United Kingdom was a member of the European Union. Following the withdrawal of the United Kingdom from the European Union, the UK and Egypt signed a continuity trade agreement on 5 December 2020, based on the EU free trade agreement; the agreement entered into force on 1 January 2021. Trade value between Egypt and the United Kingdom was worth £4,896 million in 2022.

== Cultural relations ==
The cultural ties between Egypt and the UK are diverse and have grown over time. As early as 1938, the British Council opened an office in Cairo, one of its first worldwide, to promote cultural exchange and the English language in Egypt. Since then, there has been close cooperation in the field of education; with numerous Egyptian leaders studying at British universities in the 20th century and British schools in Cairo and Alexandria enjoying a high reputation. Conversely, British archaeologists have been involved in researching Pharaonic heritage since the 19th century, the British Museum in London houses one of the world's largest collections of Egyptian antiquities. This has also led to debates about cultural heritage: Egyptian archaeologists and authorities are increasingly demanding the return of iconic objects such as the Rosetta Stone, which was brought to London as looted art in 1801 and has been on display in the British Museum since 1802, with Egypt promoting its return.

Today, a small Egyptian diaspora lives in the UK, which has grown in recent decades. According to the 2001 UK census some 24,700 Egyptian-born people were present in the UK. The Office for National Statistics estimates that the equivalent figure for 2009 was 27,000. Many of them are academics, students, or skilled workers who contribute to British society and the economy. In return, hundreds of thousands of Britons visit Egypt as tourists every year; in 2015, nearly one million Britons traveled to Sharm el-Sheikh on the Red Sea alone.

== Security ties ==
The relations also concern military business. Such as training, visits and access to the Commonwealth War Graves in Heliopolis and El Alamein. Also co-ordination over flights and Suez Canal transits for warships.

Since 2016, joint military exercises between the two countries have become more frequent and intensive. These include naval exercises, air exercises, and ground exercises (e.g., to improve counterterrorism capabilities). Since the signing of the security memorandum between the Egyptian and British defense ministries in September 2015, hundreds of security personnel have been trained in the United Kingdom. The UK has sent security experts to Egypt to improve security measures at airports and ports, and intelligence information on the activities of transnational terrorist groups is exchanged regularly. Due to its location on the Red Sea/Suez Canal, Egypt is considered an important strategic partner for London. When it comes to equipping the Egyptian armed forces, traditional security partners such as the US and France have an advantage over the British, but defense contractors such as BAE Systems and Rolls-Royce Defense have shown interest in the Egyptian market.

== Diplomatic missions ==
Egypt's embassy in the United Kingdom is located at 26 South Audley Street, London W1K 1DW.

The United Kingdom's embassy in Egypt is located at 7 Ahmed Ragheb Street, Garden City, Cairo. Outside Cairo, there is a British Consulate-General in Alexandria and an Honorary Consulate in Sharm el Sheik.

The current Egyptian Ambassador to the UK is Sherif Kamel, the British Ambassador to Egypt is Mark Bryson-Richardson MBE.

== Resident diplomatic missions ==
- Egypt has an embassy in London.
- United Kingdom has an embassy in Cairo and a consulate-general in Alexandria.
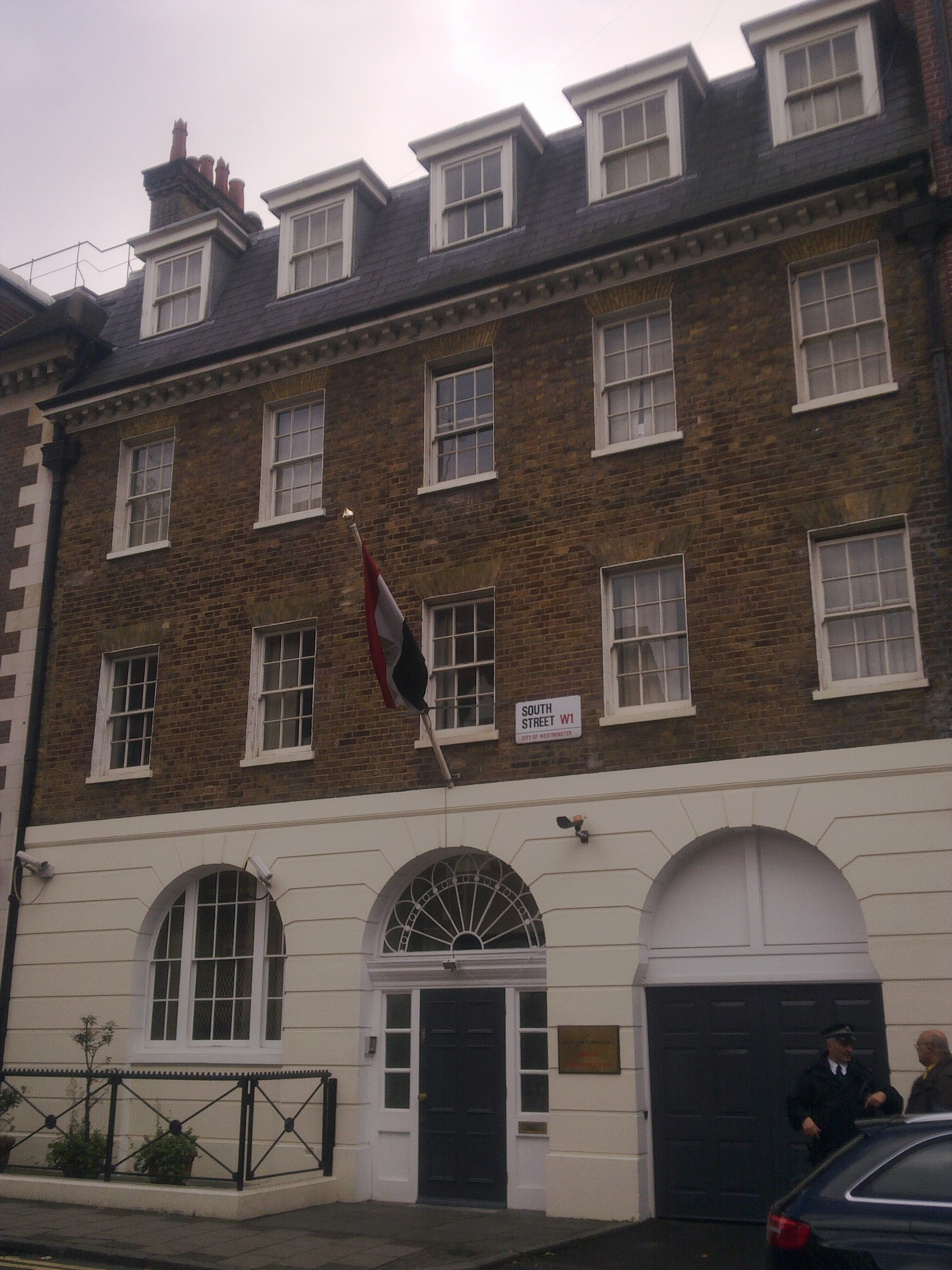
Embassy of Egypt in London

== See also ==
- List of Ambassadors from Egypt to the United Kingdom
- List of diplomats from the United Kingdom to Egypt
- Egyptians in the United Kingdom
- Anglo-Egyptian War, of 1882
