= Cambridge School (imperial history) =

The Cambridge School of historiography is a school of thought which approaches the study of the British Empire from the imperialist point of view. It emerged especially at the University of Cambridge in the 1960s. John Andrew Gallagher (1919–80) was especially influential, particularly in his article with Ronald Robinson on "The Imperialism of Free Trade".

Leaders of the School include Anil Seal, Gordon Johnson, Richard Gordon, and David A. Washbrook.

== Selected works ==
- Gallagher, John, and Ronald Robinson. "The Imperialism of Free Trade," Economic History Review (August 1953) 6#1 pp 1–15, doi:10.1111/j.1468-0289.1953.tb01482.x in JSTOR
- Gallagher, John. The Decline, Revival and Fall of the British Empire (Cambridge, 1982) excerpt and text search
- Anil Seal, The Emergence of Indian Nationalism: Competition and Collaboration in the Later Nineteenth Century (1971)
- Gordon Johnson, Provincial Politics and Indian Nationalism: Bombay and the Indian National Congress 1880–1915 (2005)
- Rosalind O'Hanlon and David Washbrook, eds. Religious Cultures in Early Modern India: New Perspectives (2011)
- Robinson, Ronald, John Gallagher and Alice Denny. Africa and the Victorians: The Official Mind of Imperialism (1978)

== Criticism ==
Critics have attacked various ideas of the School. In The New Imperial Histories Reader, Stephen Howe has assembled articles by critics who take aim especially at P. J. Marshall, D. K. Fieldhouse, Robinson and Gallagher, and A. G. Hopkins.

Howard Spodek, for example, praises the school's regional and pluralist perspectives but criticizes their reliance on British (rather than Indian) documentation, sloppy use of social science models, downplaying of ideology, and their excessive emphasis on Indian self-seeking and the importance of British imperial initiatives in achieving modernization. He recommends a deeper appreciation of Indian initiatives, and more attention to the emerging importance of public life in many areas of society rather than just a concentration on politics.

== See also ==
- Historiography of the British Empire
- Theories of New Imperialism
- Cambridge School (intellectual history) which deals with the history of ideas generally and not the Empire
