= Official mind =

The official mind is the ideas, perceptions, and intentions of those policy-makers who had a bearing on British imperial policies. The policy maker is a politician or civil servant who had influence over imperial policy.

The official mind is extensively written about in Ronald Robinson's extraordinarily influential work, Africa and the Victorians: The Official Mind of Imperialism, was co-authored with John Gallagher and Alice Denny and first published in 1961. Historian John Darwin states that while the "local habitation" of the official mind is in Whitehall "its real field of operations lay in those diplomatic-strategic spheres where official control was greatest. In imperial terms that chiefly meant the Mediterranean and Near East."

== Bibliography ==
Notes

References

- Darwin, John (June 1997). "Imperialism and the Victorians: The Dynamics of Territorial Expansion". The English Historical Review. 112 (447). Oxford University Press: 614–642. doi:10.1093/ehr/cxii.447.614. ISSN 1477-4534. JSTOR 576347.
- Heinlein, Frank (2002). British government policy and decolonisation, 1945-1963: scrutinising the official mind (2002 ed.). Routledge. ISBN 978-0-7146-5220-7. - Total pages: 337
- Robinson, Ronald Edward; Gallagher, John; Denny, Alice (1961). Africa and the Victorians: the official mind of imperialism (1961 ed.). Macmillan. - Total pages: 491
