= J. A. Hobson =

English economist, social scientist and critic of imperialism (1858–1940)

John A. Hobson
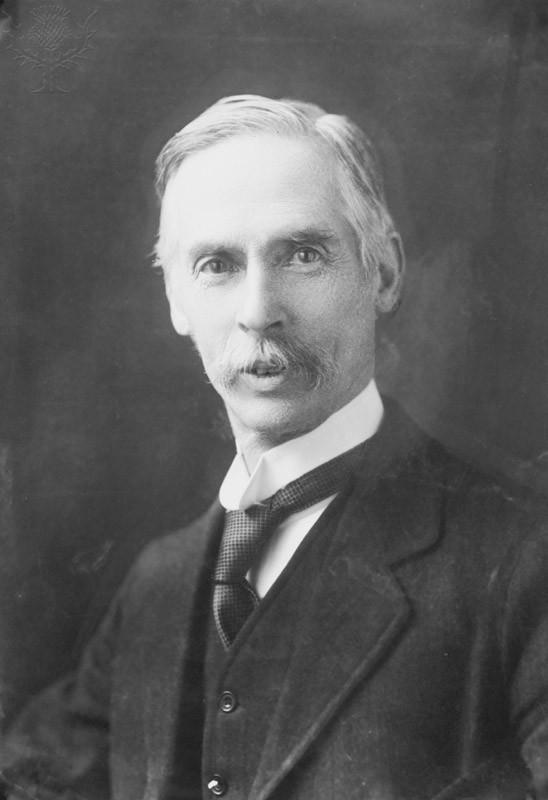
- Hobson in c. 1910
- Born: John Atkinson Hobson; 6 July 1858; Derby, England
- Died: 1 April 1940 (aged 81); Hampstead, London, England

Academic background
- Education: Lincoln College, Oxford
- Influences: George; Hyndman; Mummery

Academic work
- Discipline: Imperialism studies; Poverty studies
- School or tradition: Liberal socialism
- Notable ideas: Imperialism: A Study; Underconsumption

John Atkinson Hobson (6 July 1858 – 1 April 1940) was an English economist and social scientist. Hobson is best known for his writing on imperialism, which influenced Vladimir Lenin, and his theory of underconsumption.

His principal and earliest contribution to economics was the theory of underconsumption, a scathing criticism of Say's law and classical economics' emphasis on thrift. Other early work critiqued the classical theory of rent and anticipated the Neoclassical "marginal productivity" theory of distribution.

After covering the Second Boer War as a correspondent for The Manchester Guardian, he condemned British involvement in the war and characterised it as acting under the influence of mine owners. In a series of books, he explored the associations between imperialism and international conflict and asserted that imperial expansion is driven by a search for new markets and investment opportunities overseas.

Later, he argued that maldistribution of income resulted, through oversaving and underconsumption, in unemployment (thus he rejected the position that structural unemployment was caused by "Collective Bargaining" encouraged by the 1875 and 1906 Acts of Parliament) and that the remedy was in eradicating the "surplus" by the redistribution of income by taxation and the nationalization of monopolies. He opposed the First World War and advocated the formation of a world political body to prevent wars. Following the war, he became a reformist socialist.

== Life ==
=== Early life ===
Hobson was born in Derby in Derbyshire, the son of William Hobson, "a rather prosperous newspaper proprietor", and Josephine Atkinson. He was the brother of the mathematician Ernest William Hobson.

=== Early career ===
When Hobson relocated to London in 1887, England was in the midst of a major economic depression. While classical economics was at a loss to explain the vicious business cycles, London had many societies that proposed alternatives. While living in London, Hobson was exposed to the Social Democrats and H.M. Hyndman, Christian Socialists, and Henry George's Single-tax system. He befriended several of the prominent Fabians who would found the London School of Economics, some of whom he had known at Oxford. However, none of these groups proved persuasive enough for Hobson; rather it was his collaboration with a friend, the businessman and mountain climber Albert F. Mummery, that would produce Hobson's contribution to economics: the theory of underconsumption. First described by Mummery and Hobson in the book Physiology of Industry (1889), underconsumption was a scathing criticism of Say's law and classical economics' emphasis on thrift. The forwardness of the book's conclusions discredited Hobson among the professional economics community. Ultimately he was excluded from the academic community.

During the very late 19th century, his works included Problems of Poverty (1891), Evolution of Modern Capitalism (1894), Problem of the Unemployed (1896) and John Ruskin: Social Reformer (1898). They developed Hobson's critique of the classical theory of rent and his proposed generalization anticipated the Neoclassical "marginal productivity" theory of distribution.

=== Boer War and imperialism ===
Soon after this period Hobson was recruited by the editor of the newspaper The Manchester Guardian to be their South African correspondent. During his coverage of the Second Boer War, Hobson began to form the idea that imperialism was the direct result of the expanding forces of modern capitalism. He believed the mine owners, led by Cecil Rhodes, wanted control of the Transvaal. Accordingly, he believed they manipulated the British into fighting the Boers so that they could maximize their profits from mining. His return to England was marked by his strong condemnation of the conflict.

His publications during the next few years demonstrated an exploration of the associations between imperialism and international conflict. These works included War in South Africa (1900) and Psychology of Jingoism (1901). In what is arguably his magnum opus, Imperialism (1902), he espoused the opinion that imperial expansion is driven by a search for new markets and investment opportunities overseas. Imperialism gained Hobson an international reputation, and influenced such notable thinkers as Vladimir Lenin and Leon Trotsky, and Hannah Arendt's The Origins of Totalitarianism (1951).

In a 1902 Political Science Quarterly article, Hobson challenged numerous moral justifications for imperialism, including the notion that "less efficient" nations benefitted from subordination to "more efficient" nations.

Hobson wrote for several other journals before writing his next major work, The Industrial System (1909). In this tract he argued that maldistribution of income resulted, through oversaving and underconsumption, in unemployment and that the remedy was in eradicating the "surplus" by the redistribution of income by taxation and the nationalization of monopolies.

=== First World War and later career ===
Hobson's opposition to the First World War caused him to join the Union of Democratic Control. His advocacy for the formation of a world political body to prevent wars can be found in his piece Towards International Government (1914). However, he became staunchly opposed to the League of Nations.

In 1919, Hobson joined the Independent Labour Party. This was soon followed by writings for socialist publications such as the New Leader, the Socialist Review and the New Statesman. During this period it became clear that Hobson favoured capitalist reformation over communist revolution. He was critical of the Labour Government elected in 1929.

Hobson's autobiography Confessions of an Economic Heretic was published in 1938.

== Commentary on Hobson ==
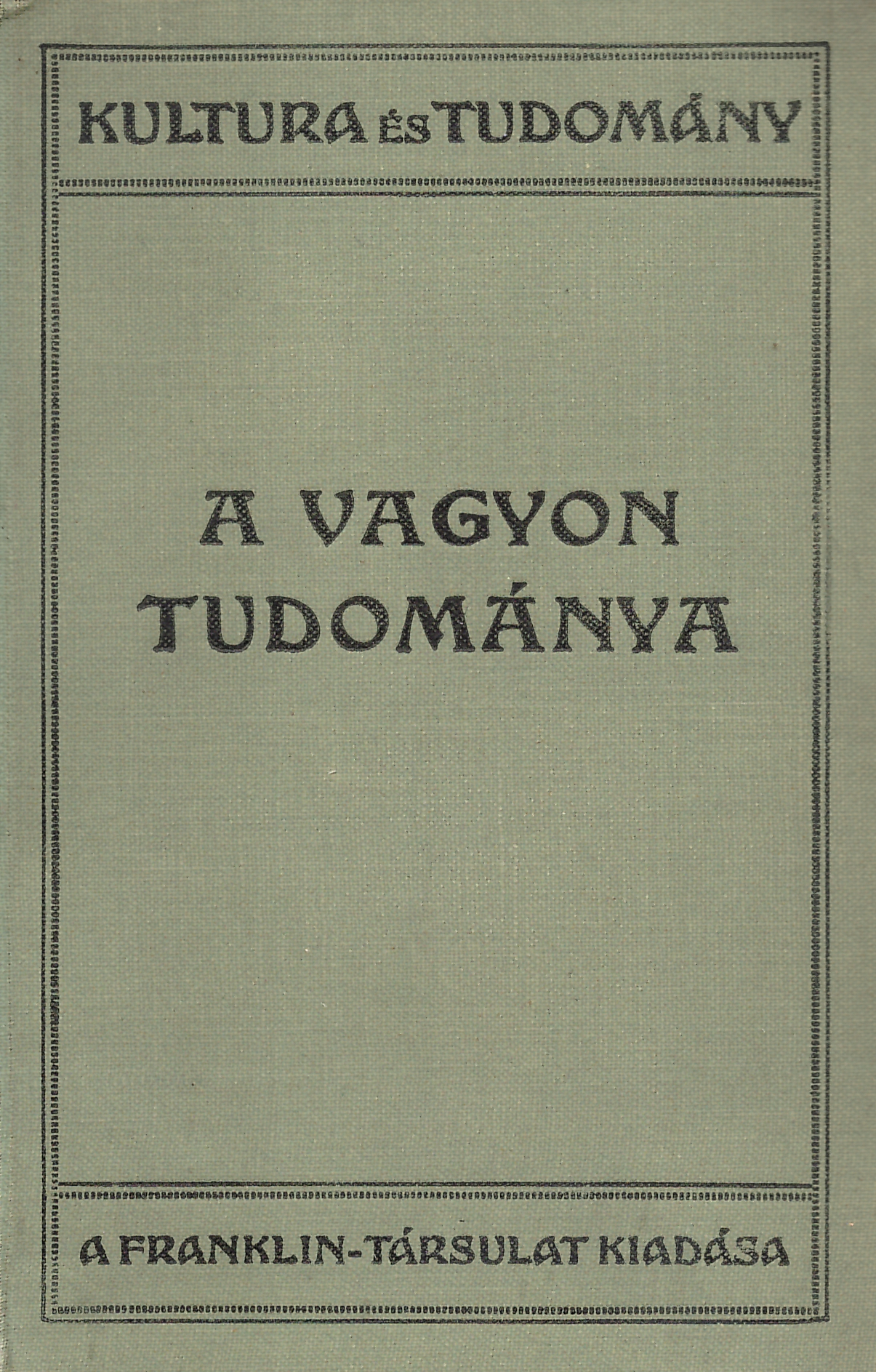
J. A. Hobson: The Science of Wealth (Hungarian edition)

=== Critical appraisal ===
R. H. Tawney wrote the following in The Acquisitive Society (1920):

The greater part of modern property has been attenuated to a pecuniary lien or bond on the product of industry which carries with it a right to payment, but which is normally valued precisely because it relieves the owner from any obligation to perform a positive or constructive function. Such property may be called passive property, or property for acquisition, for exploitation, or for power.... It is questionable, however, whether economists shall call it "Property" at all, and not rather, as Mr. Hobson has suggested, "Improperty," since it is not identical with the rights which secure the owner the produce of his toil, but is opposite of them.

V.I. Lenin, in Imperialism, the Highest Stage of Capitalism (1916)—which was probably his most influential work on later Marxian scholarship—made use of Hobson's Imperialism extensively, remarking in the preface "I made use of the principal English work, Imperialism, J. A. Hobson's book, with all the care that, in my opinion, that work deserves." In the work itself—despite disagreeing with Hobson's liberal politics—Lenin repeatedly cites Hobson's interpretation of imperialism approvingly; for example:

We see that Kautsky, while claiming that he continues to advocate Marxism, as a matter of fact takes a step backward compared with the social-liberal Hobson, who more correctly takes into account two "historically concrete" ... features of modern imperialism: (1) the competition between several imperialisms, and (2) the predominance of the financier over the merchant.

Historians Peter Duignan and Lewis H. Gann argue that Hobson had an enormous influence in the early 20th century among people all around the world:

Hobson's ideas were not entirely original; however his hatred of moneyed men and monopolies, his loathing of secret compacts and public bluster, fused all existing indictments of imperialism into one coherent system....His ideas influenced German nationalist opponents of the British Empire as well as French Anglophobes and Marxists; they colored the thoughts of American liberals and isolationist critics of colonialism. In days to come they were to contribute to American distrust of Western Europe and of the British Empire. Hobson helped make the British averse to the exercise of colonial rule; he provided indigenous nationalists in Asia and Africa with the ammunition to resist rule from Europe.

Later historians attacked Hobson and the Marxist theories of imperialism he influenced. Notably, Jack Gallagher and Ronald Robinson in their 1953 article The Imperialism of Free Trade argued that Hobson placed too much emphasis on the role of formal empire and directly ruled colonial possessions, not taking into account the significance of trading power, political influence and informal imperialism. They also argued that the difference in British foreign policy that Hobson observed between the mid-19th-century indifference to empire that accompanied free market economics, and the later intense imperialism after 1870, was not real.

Hobson believed "colonial primitive peoples" were inferior. In Imperialism he advocated their "gradual elimination" by an international organization: "A rational stirpiculture in the wide social interest might, however, require a repression of the spread of degenerate or unprogressive races". Such a plan should be implemented, according to Hobson, following approval by an "international political organization". While it can be said the 1902 work reflected the Social Darwinism trend of the time, Hobson left this section mainly unchanged when he published the third edition in 1938.

=== Antisemitism ===
Hobson's early works were critical of the impact of Jewish immigration and Jewish financiers. In the 1890s he argued that large scale Jewish immigration from the Russian Partition to Western Europe harmed the interests of native workers and advocated limitations on immigration. Writing on the South African war in War in South Africa (1900), he linked the impetus towards war to "Jew Power" in South Africa and saw Johannesburg as a "New Jerusalem". Hobson wrote that "Jewish financiers", whom he saw as "parasites", manipulated the British government that danced to their "diabolical tune". According to history professor Norman Etherington, the section on financiers in Imperialism seems irrelevant to Hobson's economic discourse, and was probably included since Hobson truly believed it. Hobson was innovative in tying between 1898 and 1902 the concept of modernity, empire, and Jews together; according to Hobson, the international financiers influenced the government partially through Jewish press ownership in South Africa and London.

Hobson's analysis was widely disseminated by those opposed to the war and received significant attention. Other contemporary anti-war writers also alleged a mainly Jewish "capitalist conspiracy" was taking place. Following Hobson's January 1900 article Capitalism and Imperialism in South Africa, Labour leader Keir Hardie in February 1900 repeated the same message in paraphrased form accusing "half a dozen financial houses, many of them Jewish" of leading the UK to war. However, as the British working class tended to support the war in South Africa, Hobson's zeal in attacking "Jew Power" in South Africa and manipulation by a secret "racial confederacy" failed to attract popular support in Britain, though "anti-Alien" sentiments continued to be an issue. Among commentators in Continental Europe, in particular France and Germany, the alleged "robbery committed by international Jewry" was frequently linked by right-wing antisemites to "British imperialist piracy" during the Second Boer War.

== Books ==
- The Physiology of Industry (written with Albert F. Mummery) (1889).
- Problems of Poverty (1891).
- Evolution of Modern Capitalism (1894).
- Problem of the Unemployed (1896).
- John Ruskin: Social Reformer (1898).
- The Economics of Distribution. London: Macmillan. 1900 – via Internet Archive.
- The War in South Africa: Its Causes and Effects (1900).
- Capitalism and Imperialism in South Africa (1900)
- Psychology of Jingoism (1901).
- The Social Problem: Life and Work (1901).
- Imperialism:a Study (1902)
- International Trade (1904).
- Canada Today (1906).
- The Crisis of Liberalism (1909).
- The Industrial System (1909).
- A Modern Outlook (1910).
- The Science of Wealth (1911).
- An Economic Interpretation of Investment (1911).
- Industrial Unrest (1912).
- The German Panic (1913).
- Gold, Prices and Wages (1913).
- Work and Wealth, A Human Valuation (1914).
- Traffic in Treason, A Study in Political Parties (1914).
- Towards International Government (1915).
- Western Civilization (1915).
- The New Protectionism (1916).
- Labour and the Costs of War (1916).
- Democracy after the War (1917).
- Forced Labour National Council for Civil Liberties, London (1917) Worldcat
- 1920: Dips into the Near Future (1917/1918).
- Taxation in the New State (1919).
- Richard Cobden: The International Man (1919).
- The Obstacles to Economic Recovery in Europe (1920).
- The Morals of Economic Internationalism (1920)
- The Economics of Reparation (1921).
- Problems of a New World (1921).
- Work and Wealth: a Human Valuation (1921)
- Incentives in the New Industrial Order (1922).
- The Economics of Unemployment (1922).
- Notes on Law and Order (1926).
- The Living Wage (with H. N. Brailsford, A. Creech Jones, E.F. Wise) (1926).
- The Conditions of Industrial Peace (1927).
- Wealth and Life (1929).
- Economics and Ethics (1929)
- Rationalisation and Unemployment (1930).
- God and Mammon (1931).
- Poverty in Plenty (1931).
- L. T. Hobhouse, His Life and Work (1931).
- The Recording Angel (1932).
- Saving and Spending: Why Production is Clogged (1932).
- From Capitalism to Socialism (1932).
- Rationalism and Humanism (1933).
- Democracy and a Changing Civilization (1934).
- Veblen (1936).
- Property and Improperty (1937).
- Le Sens de la responsibilité dans la vie sociale (with Herman Finer and Hanna Mentor) (1938).
- Confessions of an Economic Heretic (1938).

== See also ==
- Theories of New Imperialism for an account of Hobson's theories on imperialism.

== References and sources ==
Sources

- Simkin, John. "J. A. Hobson".
- Allett, John "New Liberalism: The Political Economy of J. A. Hobson"
- Claeys, Gregory. Imperial Sceptics. British Critics of Empire 1850–1920 (2010) Cambridge University Press. Ch. 3.
- Hobson, John Atkinson (1858–1940), social theorist and economist by Michael Freeden in Oxford Dictionary of National Biography (2004)
- Donald Markwell, John Maynard Keynes and International Relations: Economic Paths to War and Peace, Oxford University Press (2006).
- Keynes, John Maynard, The General Theory of Employment, Interest and Money (1936) Macmillan & Co.
- Hobson is also referred to in the song "Light Pollution" by popular American folk band Bright Eyes which opens with the lines "John A. Hobson was a good man, he used to lend me books and mic stands, he even got me a subscription to the socialist review."
