= Metropole =

Homeland of a colonial empire

Roman Italy, the metropole of the Roman Empire. Roman provinces are marked in pink.

A metropole (from Ancient Greek μητρόπολις (mētrópolis) 'mother city') is the homeland, central territory or the state exercising power over a colonial empire. From the 19th century, the English term metropole was mainly used in the scope of the British, Spanish, French, Dutch, Portuguese, Japanese, and Ottoman Empires to designate those empires' home territories, as opposed to their colonial or overseas territories.

== Roman Empire ==
The metropole of the Roman Empire was Italy. Originally, Rome divided the Italics into three groups: Roman citizens, Latini (semi-citizens and semi-confederates), and socii (confederates). After 88 BC, all Italics were made Roman citizens. Italy continued to have this privileged status until 212 AD, when citizenship was extended to all the inhabitants of the Empire. From Caesar Augustus (27 BC) to Septimius Severus (192 AD), all Roman Emperors were Italics (Claudius, Trajan, and Hadrian, although born outside of Italy, were of Italian descent). Italy was legally distinguished from the provinces and the term Ius Italicum identified the Roman Italian privileges, especially when it came to taxation, which could be extended to certain communities outside of Italy under certain conditions. These privileges were ended by Emperor Diocletian, and from then on, Italy would lose tax exemptions and was subdivided into provinces.

== British Empire ==
The metropole of the British Empire was the British Islands; i.e. the United Kingdom itself and surrounding territories. The term is sometimes used even more specifically to refer to London as the metropole of the Empire, insofar as the politicians and businessmen of London exerted the greatest influence throughout the Empire in diplomatic, economic and military forms. By contrast, the term “periphery” referred to the rest of the Empire.

The historiography of British metropole–periphery relations has traditionally been defined in terms of their distinct separation, with a pronouncedly one-way, metropole-directed chain of command, communication, and control proceeding outward from the centre; the metropole informed the periphery, but the periphery did not directly inform the metropole. Hence, the British Empire was constituted by the formal control of territories, by direct rule of foreign lands, which were ruled by the metropole.

More recent work, starting with that of John "Jack" Gallagher and Ronald Robinson in the 1950s, has questioned the traditional definition, positing instead that the two were mutually constitutive and maintaining that, despite the apparent temporal inconsistencies inherent in their separate existences, each formed simultaneously in relation to the other. Gallagher and Robinson were socialists, observing the rise of the economic power of the United States in the developing world at a time when the African colonies of the British Empire were being granted independence; both scholars held that British and American expansion of overseas influence were ultimately developed along similar lines.

According to the theories of Gallagher and Robinson, the usage of soft power by the British, primarily through employment of British capital and other forms of economic influence allowed for the establishment of favorable economic relationships and free trade for goods which were manufactured in Britain. In doing this, Britain was able to gain the benefits of Empire without spending money on costly military affairs. In this interpretation, the "informal empire" of the British was a defining part of the metropole just as much as the "formal empire".

== Portuguese Empire ==
In the scope of the Portuguese Empire, the metropole was the European part of Portugal, which included Continental Portugal (the mainland) and the adjacent islands (Azores and Madeira). It corresponded to the present territory of Portugal.

Until the mid 19th century, the Portuguese European territory was referred to as "Portugal" or as the "Kingdom". However, these terms became inappropriate when the Portuguese overseas territories gained the status of overseas provinces in 1832, and came to be considered an integral part of the Kingdom of Portugal alongside its European provinces. The use of the term "Metrópole" emerged then as the official designation of the European part of Portugal. From then on, and until the independence of most of the remaining Portuguese overseas territories in 1975 (excluding the period between 1933 and 1951 of explicitly being a colonial empire), Portugal included the Metrópole and the Overseas.

== Metropolitan France ==
Metropolitan France (French: France métropolitaine or la Métropole), also known as European France (Territoire européen de la France) is the area of France which is geographically in Europe.

== Sources ==
- Juang, Richard M.; Morrissette, Noelle Anne, eds. (2008). Africa and the Americas: Culture, Politics, and History: A Multidisciplinary Encyclopedia, Volume 2. ABC-CLIO. ISBN 978-1-85109-441-7.
- Webster, Anthony (2006). The Debate on the Rise of the British Empire. Manchester: Manchester University Press. ISBN 978-0-7190-6793-8.
