= Colonial surplus =

A colonial surplus is a way of measuring the effects of the relationship between a colony and a metropolis.

A colony, in the sense of a region being ruled by a foreign or overseas power, was in a different position from that of an independent country. As Maddison remarked some time ago of India, "The major burden of foreign rule arose from the fact that the British Raj was a regime of expatriates." Such expatriates generate a flow of funds out of the colony.

Simply, the colonial surplus is a measurement of the benefits - in money terms - gained by citizens, business and government of the colonising power (metropolis) from a colony. It is a measure of exploitation. It describes and calculates part of the economic relationship between colonising power and colony. The part it describes is revenue to the metropolis. The colonial surplus measures in money terms what the metropolis gets out of its colony: its gains. The surplus includes the sum of the trading and financial relationship between the two. (and it covers gains made by other nationals operating in the colony). The foremost part deals with the balance of trade and services.

The presence of a colonial surplus may be evidenced by an export surplus on the part of the colony that was outstandingly large. The export surplus must be particularly large, for it has to pay real expenses such as insurance and freight of the goods exported which may not be part of the colonial surplus. But it is better if there is a Balance of Payments account for the colony. Better still if this can be supported by statistics from the Balance of Payments or National Income for the metropolis or from other overseas accounts. It need not be supposed that those records of colonial exploitation are especially accurate for accountancy was in its infancy and there will be errors, omissions and downright evasions in them. Nonetheless used critically they should be enough to determine the size of the Colonial Surplus, if any.

Included in this calculation would be items not only like private and government dividends and profits transferred abroad but also pensions transferred abroad, travel expenses to and from the colony, other government expenditures overseas, changes in overseas bank balances and so on. Attention should be paid to profits made but not distributed in the colony and to investment out of undistributed profits which may or may not be included in the colony’s Balance of Payments. An example is the colony of the Netherlands East Indies (Indonesia) where they could not be included in the Balance of Payments for lack of evidence.

In several colonies special arrangements were made for the transfer of funds that should be included in the Colonial Surplus but do not appear in the colony’s balance of payments data. They have to be sought for elsewhere.

All but one of these items above deal with international transactions (or should do). The exception to this would be the inclusion of incomes made in the colony by non-indigenous private persons and businesses.

Further items might be added, such as the inclusion of the colonial budget (or part of it), special profits made by metropolitan nationals through their superior status, gains from exports to the colony that would not otherwise have been made and so on. These are more debatable items. All of them except for the colonial budget were presented and discussed in a paper on the Netherlands East Indies by a former colonial statistician in 1946. A further method to include underestimated profits and tributes was outlined by Amiya Bagchi in 2002.

Some authors incline to the view that - taking changes into account - the same principle may be utilised to measure exploitation of developing countries in the present-day world. Other authors deny the whole validity of the concept.

== See also ==
- British Empire
- History of colonialism
