= Informal empire =

Spheres of influence of an empire arising without formal annexation

The term informal empire describes the spheres of influence which a polity may develop that translate into a degree of influence over a region or country, which is not a formal colony, protectorate, tributary, or vassal state of an empire, as a result of its commercial, strategic, or military interests.

In a 2010 article, Gregory Barton and Brett Bennett defined informal empire as:

A willing and successful attempt by commercial and political elites to control a foreign region, resource, or people. The means of control included the enforcement of extraterritorial privileges and the threat of economic and political sanctions, often coupled with the attempt to keep other would-be imperial powers at bay. For the term "informal empire" to be applicable, we argue, historians have to show that one nation's elite or government exerted extraterritorial legal control, de facto economic domination, and was able to strongly influence policies in a foreign country critical to the more powerful country's interests.

An informal empire may assume a primarily economic guise, or it may be enforced by gunboat diplomacy. Strategic considerations or other concerns may bring about the creation of an imperial influence over a region not formally a component of an empire.

== Origins ==
The city-state of Athens exerted control over the Delian League through an informal empire in the 5th century BCE. According to historian Jeremy Black, the role of chartered companies such as the Muscovy Company, the Levant Company, the East India Company and the Hudson's Bay Company, which operated beyond official state channels, was a forerunner to the concept of "informal empire".

== United Kingdom ==
The concept of an informal empire is most commonly associated with the British Empire, where it is used to describe the extensive reach of British interests into regions and nations not formally under Britain's control. Among the most notable elements of the British informal empire was Britain's trade relationships with Qing China and South America. Britain's informal empire consisted primarily of three elements: extraterritoriality, a trade system that heavily favoured Britain and interventionist tools such as military force and diplomatic pressure. Several unequal treaties were signed between Britain and China, resulting in concessions being established in Chinese port cities, such as the Shanghai International Settlement. This system broke down after the fragmentation of China during the Warlord Era, leading Britain and other Western powers to be unable to effectively enforce their privileges in mainland China.

Historians have noted Britain's informal empire differed between different regions. The informal empire in China was established only in the aftermath of the Opium Wars, and was maintained through military force and diplomatic pressure. Developments in the 1890s led to a shift from more informal to more formal control at the turn of the century, with the establishment of more concessions and the carving of spheres of influence. These rights were returned during the Second World War so that China would continue resisting Japan. Conversely, the informal empire in South America was supported by local governments were often willing partners in the extension of British commercial influence, though military action was sometimes taken against nations which maintained protectionist policies. A report from the British General Staff declared that the British military intervention in the Russian Civil War on behalf of the White Army was motivated in part by a desire to establish an informal empire of political influence and economic ties in Southern Russia, to deny Germany access to these assets and block their passage to British colonies in Asia.

In the economic sphere, the British informal empire was driven by the free trade economic system of the Empire. In the so-called "Imperialism of Free Trade" thesis, as articulated by historians Ronald Robinson and John "Jack" Gallagher, the British Empire expanded as much by the growth of informal empire as it did by acquiring formal dominion over colonies. Furthermore, British investment in empire was to be found not only in the formal Empire, but also in the informal empire—and, by Robinson and Gallagher's account, was indeed predominantly located in the informal empire. It is estimated that between 1815 and 1880, £1,187,000,000 in credit had accumulated abroad, but no more than one-sixth was placed in the formal empire. Even by 1913, less than half of the £3,975,000,000 of foreign investment lay inside the formal Empire.

The British historian David Reynolds has claimed that during the process of decolonisation, it was hoped that as an alternative to the declining formal empire, informal influence, marked by economic ties and defense treaties, would hold sway over the former colonies. Reynolds suggested that the establishment of the Commonwealth was an attempt to maintain some form of indirect influence over the newly independent countries.

== United States ==
U.S. foreign policy from the late 19th century onward, under Presidents such as Grover Cleveland, Theodore Roosevelt, Woodrow Wilson, and New Deal leaders, has been described as "informal empire". 20th century U.S. policy of establishing international influence through friendly regimes, military bases and interventions, and economic pressure, has drawn comparisons with the informal empires of European colonial powers. The fundamental elements involved a clientelistic relationship with the elite, sometimes established forcibly; effective veto power over issues pertaining to the Great Power's interests; and the use of military threats, regime change, or multilateral pressure to accomplish diplomatic aims. The policy is intended to create an international economic order that benefits the Great Power by creating markets for export and investment, improving the profitability of their capitalists. This commitment to an open economy is selective and applied only when it benefits their producers. The Philippines, Vietnam, Iraq, and Iran are examples of this policy being implemented.

The policy was summed up by former Secretary of State William Bryan as having "opened the doors of all the weaker countries to an invasion of American capital and American enterprise." Under informal empire, the U.S. relationship with countries which supplied them raw materials became highly imbalanced, with much of their wealth being repatriated to the U.S. This also disproportionately benefited the (often authoritarian) pro-American rulers of these countries at the expense of local development.

By the end of World War II, US influence over China was greater than any foreign power in the last century, with American personnel appointed in military, economic and political field,s such as the American Chief of Staff of the Chinese military,;American management of the Chinese War Production Board and Board of Transport, SACO trainers of Chiang's secret police,;Patrick Hurley's management of political unification,;and Chiang's American personal advisor. Sir George Sansom, British envoy to the US, reported that many US military officers saw US monopoly on Far Eastern trade as a rightful reward for fighting the Pacific war, a sentiment echoed by US elected officials and industrial leaders. The U.S. chose to switch from formal to informal imperialism after the Second World War not because of lack of desire among Americans for colonialism (there was strong public support for seizing colonies from the vanquished Japan, as well as a continued belief in colonies' incapability to govern themselves) but rather because of a changed international landscape. Since most of the world was already organised into colonies, US policymakers chose to utilisse pre-xisting colonial empire networks instead of establishing new colonies. The US also had to adapt themselves to rising anti-colonial nationalist movements so as to acquire allies against the Soviet Union.

== France ==
French interventions in Mexico (1838, 1861) and limited actions elsewhere in Latin America have sometimes been described as forms of "informal empire". However, French involvement in the region was relatively sporadic and far less extensive than that of other European powers, particularly Britain. Intervention was supported primarily by certain segments of local elites who looked to French ideals and power as a means of advancing their own political and social positions. The decolonisation of Africa led to the conversion of many former colonies into client states under a French informal empire known as Françafrique. Chief of Staff for African Affairs Jacques Foccart was the figure instrumental in creating collaborative networks between the French government and the new African elites. The purpose of the network was to aid capital accumulation for France.

== Germany ==
In the 19th century, the leadership of the German Empire, which had formed in 1871, sought to acquire a colonial empire, yet observed that in most parts of the world, British commercial influence already existed. While the German Empire did conquer various colonies that became the formal German colonial empire, efforts before 1914 were also made to establish an informal empire based on the British model. German trade and influence in South America was a major factor in this projected informal empire. Informal empire attempts preceded the German Empire, including the Rhenish Missionary Society. During most of the 1800s, Karl von Koseritz was one who advocated for a "Greek colonization" of Germans in Brazil. Ultimately amounting only to German immigration to the Brazilian Empire, it was perceived as a form of colonial space. German firms played a significant role in the industrialization of Argentina, and German banks competed with British ones in South America, while building infrastructure was seen as a way to extend the informal empire. Germany invested in the Anatolian and Baghdad railroads in the Ottoman Empire, which led to tension with Britain and Russia who were in their own Great Game of formal and informal empire in Asia. The Venezuelan crisis of 1902–1903 led by Britain and Germany was another attempt at expanding spheres of influence.

== Japan ==
Japanese diplomacy and military intervention in China from 1895 to the outbreak of the Second World War has also been described as an informal empire. Japan was forced into concealing their territorial ambitions under informal terms as they lacked the strength to overcome Western objections to Japanese territorial gains. The Japanese advanced their own special privileges in China through promoting Western interests alongside their own. Japan profited immensely from the informal empire in China and Japan's first multinational manufacturing firms were initiated in China rather than Japan's formal colonies due to China's vast internal market and raw material supply. Chinese popular pressure to drive out Japanese imperial institutions led to the Japanese attempting to switch from informal to formal imperialism to protect their profits, beginning the Second World War in Asia.

== Russian Empire ==
The Russian Empire under the Romanovs, in addition to a formal empire that expanded rapidly, also developed an informal empire. Examples included Russian influence in Qajar Iran and leased concessions in China.

After the 1828 Treaty of Turkmenchay, Russia received territorial domination in Iran. With the Romanovs shifting to a policy of 'informal support' for the weakened Qajar dynasty — continuing to place pressure with advances in the largely nomadic Turkestan, a crucial frontier territory of the Qajars — this Russian domination of Qajar Persia continued for nearly a century. The Persian monarchy became more of a symbolic concept in which Russian diplomats were themselves powerbrokers in Iran and the monarchy was dependent on British and Russian loans for funds. In 1879, the establishment of the Cossack Brigade by Russian officers gave the Russian Empire influence over the modernization of the Qajar army. This influence was especially pronounced because the Persian monarchy's legitimacy was predicated on an image of military prowess, first Turkic and then European-influenced. By the 1890s, Russian tutors, doctors, and officers were prominent at the Shah's court, influencing policy personally. Russia and Britain had competing investments in the industrialisation of Iran, including roads and telegraph lines, as a way to profit and extend their influence. However, until 1907 the Great Game rivalry was so pronounced that mutual British and Russian demands to the Shah to exclude the other blocked all railroad construction at the end of the 19th century. In the Anglo-Russian Convention of 1907, the Russian Empire and British Empire officially ended their rivalry to focus on opposing the German Empire. In the Convention of 1907, Russia recognized Afghanistan and southern Iran as part of the British sphere of influence, while Britain recognized Central Asia and northern Iran as part of the Russian sphere of influence. Both parties recognized Tibet as a neutral territory, except Russia had special privileges in negotiating with the Dalai Lama, and Britain had special privileges in Tibetan commercial deals.

The Russian Empire had also acquired several concessions in China, including the Liaodong Peninsula (chiefly Port Arthur and Dalian) and the Chinese Eastern Railway. This part of Russia's informal empire was officially thwarted by the Russo-Japanese War in 1905, after which most of the Russian concessions in China became part of Japan's informal empire.

Scholar Sally N. Cummings argues that while "Russian imperialism was never primarily commercial" and "was less often able than the British to control an informal empire beyond its state borders", several imperialistic relationships existed with elements of indirect rule. She cites that the Siberian "fur empire" of the early Tsardom of Russia, before the complete conquest of Siberia, heavily resembled the French fur trade empire in New France. She also states that the 19th century Russia's conquest of Central Asia used as an economic model the cotton industry in British Egypt, and as a territorial model Britain's suzerainty over the princely states that dotted the Raj.

== Soviet Union ==
Various scholars have described the Soviet Union's international relations as a Soviet empire, where the Soviet Union dominated the states in its sphere of influence, contrary to the Soviet Union's formal aim of opposing nationalism and imperialism. The notion of a "Soviet empire" often refers to a form of "classic" or "colonial" empire with communism only replacing conventional imperial ideologies such as Christianity or monarchy, rather than creating a revolutionary state. Academically the idea is seen as emerging with Richard Pipes' 1957 book The Formation of the Soviet Union: Communism and Nationalism, 1917-1923, but it has been reinforced, along with several other views, in continuing scholarship. In a more formal interpretation of "Soviet empire", this meant absolutism, resembling Lenin's description of the tsarist empire as a "prison of the peoples" except that this "prison of the peoples" had been actualized during Stalin's regime after Lenin's death.

Another view, especially of the non-Stalinist eras, sees the Soviet empire as constituting an "informal empire" over nominally sovereign states in the Warsaw Pact due to Soviet pressure and military presence. The Soviet informal empire depended on subsidies from Moscow. The informal empire in the wider Warsaw Pact also included linkages between Communist Parties. Some historians consider a more multinational-oriented Soviet Union emphasizing its socialist initiatives, such as Ian Bremmer, who describes a "matryoshka-nationalism" where a pan-Soviet nationalism included other nationalisms. Eric Hobsbawn argued that the Soviet Union had effectively designed nations by drawing borders. Dmitri Trenin wrote that by 1980, the Soviet Union had formed both a formal and informal empire.

The informal empire would have included Soviet economic investments, military occupation, and covert action in Soviet-aligned countries. The studies of informal empire have included Soviet influence on East Germany and 1930s Xinjiang. After the Sino-Soviet conflict (1929), the Soviet Union regained the Russian Empire's concession of the Chinese Eastern Railway and held it until its return in 1952. In the 1920s the Soviet empire had come to include satellite People's Republics such as Mongolia and Tannu Tuva, the latter of which was later annexed. The Comintern influence over Asian communist parties was seen as a potential stepping stone to extend the Soviet informal empire.

Alexander Wendt suggested that by the time of Stalin's Socialism in One Country alignment, socialist internationalism "evolved into an ideology of control rather than revolution under the rubric of socialist internationalism" internally within the Soviet Union. By the start of the Cold War, it evolved into a "coded power language" that was once again international, but applied to the Soviet informal empire. At times the USSR signaled toleration of policies of satellite states indirectly, by declaring them consistent or inconsistent with socialist ideology, essentially recreating a hegemonic role. Wendt argued that a "hegemonic ideology" could continue to motivate actions after the original incentives were removed and argued this explains the "zeal of East German Politburo members who chose not to defend themselves against trumped-up charges during the 1950s purges."

Analyzing the dissolution of the Soviet Union, Koslowski and Kratochwil argued that a postwar Soviet "formal empire" represented by the Warsaw Pact, with Soviet military role and control over of member states' foreign relations, had evolved into an informal suzerainty or "Ottomanization" from the late 1970s to 1989. With Gorbachev's relinquishing of the Brezhnev Doctrine in 1989, the informal empire reduced in pressure to a more conventional sphere of influence, resembling Finlandization but applied to the erstwhile East Bloc states, until the Soviet fall in 1991. By contrast, "Austrianization" would have been a realist model of great power politics by which the Soviets would have hypothetically relied on Western guarantees to keep an artificial Soviet sphere of influence. The speed of reform in the 1989 to 1991 period made both a repeat of Finlandization and Austrianization impossible for the Soviet Union.

== Ottoman Empire ==
One view on Ottoman suzerainty stated that the loose control that the Ottoman Empire had in their later years, especially on distant territories, was more of an informal empire than a formal one. This model become advocated by some scholars studying the late Soviet Union's sphere of influence and comparing it to conventional historiography on the Ottomans.

The Ottomans had both formal and informal imperial relations with subjects and subject states. Meanwhile, the manner in which the British Empire and other European colonial empires had made intrusions into the Ottoman Empire, such as British Egypt, can also be grouped as an informal empire at the expense of the Ottomans. However, British attempts to support the Ottoman Empire in the 19th century have also been considered a form of informal empire in an influence sense.

== See also ==
- Americanization
- Emperor at home, king abroad
- Historiography of the British Empire
- History of the foreign relations of the United Kingdom
- Mandala (political model)
- New Imperialism
- Sphere of influence
- Tributary system of China
