= Keith Jeffery =

Northern Irish historian (1952-2016)

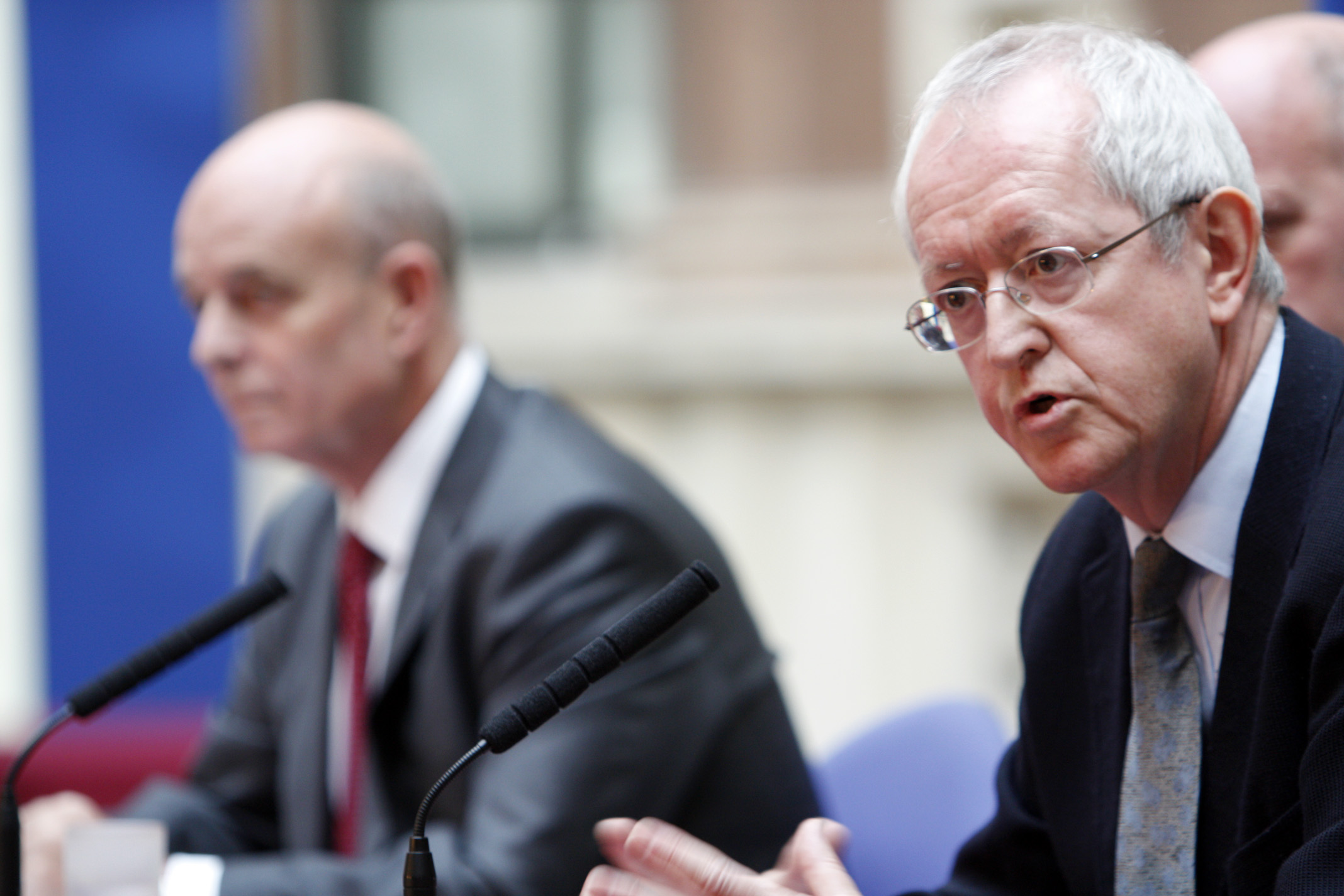
- Born: 11 January 1952; Belfast, Northern Ireland
- Died: 12 February 2016 (aged 64); Belfast, Northern Ireland
- Spouse: Sally Visick (m. 1976)
- Children: 2
- Awards: Prince Consort Prize (1978); Seeley Medal (1978); Templer Medal (2007); Member of the Royal Irish Academy (2009)

Academic background
- Education: Methodist College Belfast University of Cambridge
- Doctoral advisor: John Andrew Gallagher

Academic work
- Institutions: Queen's University Belfast; Ulster University
- Main interests: British Imperial and Irish history First World War Military intelligence
- Notable works: Field Marshal Sir Henry Wilson (2006); MI6: the history of the Secret Intelligence Service, 1909–1949 (2010); 1916: A Global History (2015)

Keith John Jeffery MRIA (11 January 1952 – 12 February 2016) was a Northern Irish historian specialising in modern British, British Imperial, and Irish history.

== Early life and education ==
Keith John Jeffery was born in Belfast in 1952. He attended Methodist College Belfast, where his father was vice principal. He obtained his BA, MA, and PhD (1978) degrees from St. John's College, Cambridge, the latter under the supervision of John Andrew Gallagher. He shared a room with fellow student Douglas Adams, and the two briefly wrote comedy sketches together.

== Career ==
In 1978, Jeffery began his career as a lecturer at Ulster Polytechnic, which became the University of Ulster in 1985, following a merger; he was named a professor in 1997. In 2005, he became professor of British history at Queen's University Belfast. In 1998, he was the Lees Knowles Lecturer at Trinity College, Cambridge, and in 2003–4 the Parnell Fellow in Irish Studies at Magdalene College, Cambridge. He also held visiting positions at the Australian National University, the Australian Defence Force Academy and Deakin University.

Although much of his work was devoted to military history, his research more recently focused on the history of intelligence gathering. In 2005, he was commissioned by the British Secret Intelligence Service (MI6) to write an authorised history for the organisation's centenary, covering its founding in 1909 up through to 1949. John Scarlett, head of MI6 at the end of that period, said credibility required that Jeffery be given unrestricted access the files for the relevant period (1900–1949). Scarlett also was quite adamant that if James Bond had been real, he would not have been an agent, but a case officer, and that it was unthinkable that a mere agent would have so much autonomy, including a license to kill. It was published in 2010. A related study, The Defence of the Realm: The Authorized History of MI5 by Christopher Andrew was published in 2009. His 1916: A Global History, published in 2015, looked at how twelve events from different arenas of war, including the Irish rebellion, reverberated around the world.

== Personal life and death ==
In 1976, Jeffery married Sally Visick, and they had two sons. He was a bass singer in the Belfast Philharmonic Choir.

Jeffery died from cancer at Royal Victoria Hospital, Belfast, on 12 February 2016, at the age of 64.

== Selected bibliography ==
- States of Emergency: British governments and strikebreaking since 1919 (London, 1983) (co-editor with Peter Hennessy)
- The British Army and the crisis of Empire, 1918–1922 (Manchester, 1984).
- The Military Correspondence of Field Marshal Sir Henry Wilson (Army Record Society, 1985) (Edited).
- Northern Ireland since 1968 (Oxford, 1988) (co-author with Paul Arthur)
- Men, Women, and War (Dublin, 1993) (co-editor with T. G. Fraser)
- A military history of Ireland (Manchester, 1996) (co-editor with Thomas Bartlett)
- An Irish empire? Aspects of Ireland and the British Empire (Manchester, 1996) (editor)
- Ireland and the Great War (Cambridge, 2000)
- The GPO and the Easter Rising (Dublin, 2006)
- Field Marshal Sir Henry Wilson: a political soldier (Oxford, 2006)
- MI6: The history of the Secret Intelligence Service, 1909–1949 (Bloomsbury, 2010) (published in the United States and Canada as The Secret History of MI6 [Penguin Press, 2010])
- 1916: A Global History (Bloomsbury, 2015)

== See also ==
- British history
- Irish history
- British Empire
- Secret Intelligence Service (MI6)
- John Andrew Gallagher
- Christopher Andrew
