= David Washbrook =

British historian (1948–2021)

- Born: 25 April 1948
- Died: 24 January 2021 (aged 72)
- Occupation: Historian
- Known for: Socio-political and economic study of South India between 18th and 20th centuries
- Notable work: South India: Political Institutions and Political Change; The Emergence of Provincial Politics: The Madras Presidency; Colonial India: A Social History

David Anthony Washbrook (25 April 1948 – 24 January 2021) was a British historian and author who studied modern India with a specific focus on the socio-political and economic conditions of South India between the 18th and 20th centuries. He was the director of the Centre for Indian Studies and a member of the Faculty of Oriental Studies at the University of Oxford and later a research professor and fellow of South Asian history at Trinity College, Cambridge.

== Early life and education ==
Washbrook was born on 25 April 1948 and was raised in a less-affluent part of South London. His mother was born in India, and his father served there during World War II. His father died when he was young and he was raised by his mother.

Washbrook studied at Trinity College, Cambridge, where he completed his fellowship dissertation in 1971 and followed it up with a PhD in 1974. He held a pre-research linguistic studentship (1969 – 1970) and the JRF research fellowship (1971–1975) from Trinity College, Cambridge, and also held the Hayter Studentship (1970–1971) as a grant from the UK's Department of Education and Science. He was the director of the Centre for Indian Studies, a member of the Faculty of Oriental Studies at the University of Oxford, as well as a research professor and fellow of South Asian history at Trinity College, Cambridge. He was also a visiting professor at Harvard University, teaching courses on South Asia and the making of modern India.

== Career and research ==
Washbrook began his career with a specific research focus on the history of southern India between the 18th and 20th centuries. His research centred on the localized provincial history of the region and built on colonial-bureaucratic records. His research also covered the socio-political and economic structures of South India of this period including social history of capitalism in the region. He was also an authority on the study of the Indian diaspora.

In the mid-1970s, he wrote two major works on the politics of South India during British colonial rule. The first, South India: Political Institutions and Political Change 1880–1940 (1975), was co-written with historian Christopher Baker, and the second, Emergence of Provincial Politics: The Madras Presidency, 1870–1920 (1976), built upon his doctoral thesis. These two books, amongst other works from Cambridge-based historians, led to a re-evaluation of politics in British India. The emerging view was called 'Cambridge School,' and was controversial for some of the ideas introduced. In these works and in other publications from this time, Washbrook drew attention to the economic conflict during the colonial era. He built on these themes in his paper 'Country Politics' which was published in the academic journal Modern Asian Studies in 1973 and studied the political economy along caste and class lines outlining the inherent inequalities. He would further develop these themes and topics in his essays including 'Land and labour in late eighteenth century South India: the golden age of the pariah,' in which he explored colonial capitalism and laws with a focus on land and property rights. He continued work in this area with 'Law, State and Agrarian Society in Colonial India' where he used law as means to study colonialism and social change in the region.

From 1974 to 1992, Washbrook was a member of the History Department at the University of Warwick. Discussions with colleagues specialising in French, British, German, American and Russian history nurtured his, and his colleagues, developing global perspective. Despite being offered a chair after a year-long sojourn at Harvard, Washbrook returned to Warwick where he pioneered the teaching of India outside of specialist centres. After moving on, he remained a frequent visitor and member of the Global History and Culture Centre.

Through the 1980s and 1990s, he continued developing his viewpoints in his essays, many of which would go on to serve as guides to the history of modern South Asia. He served as a guide to many historians and doctoral students during this time as they built on his ideas around studying the history of the region through a socio-political lens. He also drew from the integration between the ecology and agriculture of the region, making a distinction between 'wet' and 'dry' districts as means to study the local politics. During this period, he also shifted his focus to include the early 18th century, which was the first century of British colonial rule in India. Working with Christopher Bayly and Frank Perlin, two other noted historians of this time, he brought a new energy to the study of this period, triggering many debates on the origins of British rule and the prevailing conditions including the pre-colonial Indian order. He argued that India had developed a form of capitalism during this period and "in a certain sense, colonialism was the logical outcome of South Asia’s own history of capitalist development."

He observed that British colonial rule in the southern part of India had exposed the local elites to European ideas enabling cross-cultural dialogue and yielding net positive cultural outcomes, specifically calling out the Maratha court in Thanjavur. Speaking about the role of the princely states in the social development of the region, he considered their contributions had been relegated to the margins in modern Indian history despite leading the nation on education, social development, and public health investments and outcomes.

Washbrook was a part of a group of over 180 historians who wrote in protest to the UK Home Office in July 2020, asking them to reverse the "misrepresentation of slavery" and glorification of the British Empire and colonial India in a book that immigrants had to study before passing the 'Life in UK' test for permanent residency in the UK and UK citizenship. The letter went on to state that the book had false and misleading information including claims of an orderly decolonization process, which the historians noted was "demonstrably false".

== Death ==
Washbrook died on 24 January 2021. The cause for his death was not announced. He was aged 72.

== Published works ==
- Baker, Christopher John; Washbrook, D. A. (1975). South India: Political Institutions and Political Change. Springer. ISBN 978-1-349-02746-0.
- Washbrook, D. A. (1976). The Emergence of Provincial Politics: The Madras Presidency 1870–1920. Cambridge University Press. ISBN 978-0-521-05345-7.
- Washbrook, David (2004). "South India 1770-1840: The Colonial Transition". Modern Asian Studies. 38 (3): 479–516. doi:10.1017/S0026749X03001197. ISSN 0026-749X. JSTOR 3876680. S2CID 146459049.
- O'Hanlon, Rosalind; Washbrook, David (2005). Colonial India: A Social History. Hodder Education. ISBN 978-0-340-52856-3.
- Chatterji, Joya; Washbrook, David (2014). Routledge Handbook of the South Asian Diaspora. Routledge. ISBN 978-1-136-01832-9.
- Chandavarkar, Rajnayaran, ed. (2009), "Postscript by Professor David Washbrook, Trinity College, University of Cambridge", History, Culture and the Indian City, Cambridge: Cambridge University Press, pp. 251–259, doi:10.1017/cbo9780511642036.012, ISBN 978-0-521-76871-9
- Washbrook, David (2010). "The Maratha Brahmin model in south India: An afterword". The Indian Economic & Social History Review. 47 (4): 597–615. doi:10.1177/001946461004700407. ISSN 0019-4646. S2CID 143539367.
- Washbrook, David (2019). "Forms of citizenship in pre-modern South India". Citizenship Studies. 23 (3): 224–239. doi:10.1080/13621025.2019.1603270. ISSN 1362-1025. S2CID 151009083.
