= The Imperialism of Free Trade =

1953 academic journal article

"The Imperialism of Free Trade" is an academic article by John Gallagher and Ronald Robinson first published in The Economic History Review in 1953. It argued that the New Imperialism could be best characterised as a continuation of a longer-term policy begun in the 1850s in which informal empire, based on the principles of free trade, was favoured over formal imperial control unless circumstances made such rule impossible.

The article was influential in the historiographical debate on the causes of British imperial expansion in the 19th-century which since John A. Hobson's Imperialism: A Study (1902) had focused on purely economic motivation. As well as reigniting scholarly interest in theorizing New Imperialism, the article helped launch the Cambridge School of historiography.

The arguments proposed in the article were later developed in a full-length book, Africa and the Victorians (1961), in conjunction with Alice Denny. The book put forward a subtly different explanation for European expansion in Africa, built around geopolitics and a strategy of protecting British India from encroachment by other European powers. The strategic model and its relevance to East Africa was criticised for its limited documentary basis and sequential inconsistencies by John Darwin in 1997, a refutation that was further consolidated and contextualised by Jonas Gjersø in 2015.

Reviewing the debate from the end of the 20th century, historian Martin Lynn argues that Gallagher and Robinson exaggerated its impact. He says that Britain achieved its goal of increasing its economic interests in many areas, "but the broader goal of 'regenerating' societies and thereby creating regions tied as 'tributaries' to British economic interests was not attained." The reasons were:

the aim to reshape the world through free trade and its extension overseas owed more to the misplaced optimism of British policy-makers and their partial views of the world than to an understanding of the realities of the mid-19th century globe.... the volumes of trade and investment...the British were able to generate remained limited....Local economies and local regimes proved adept at restricting the reach of British trade and investment. Local impediments to foreign inroads, the inhabitants' low purchasing power, the resilience of local manufacturing, and the capabilities of local entrepreneurs meant that these areas effectively resisted British economic penetration.

The idea that free-trade imperial states use informal methods to secure their expanding economic influence has attracted Marxist historiographers to use the theory to describe how the modern economic policies of the United States and the imperialist policies of Great Britain are essentially the same, in both motive and method.
