= Howard Spodek =

American historian (1941–2023)

Howard Spodek (November 4, 1941 – August 20, 2023) was an American world historian, a professor of history and geography and urban studies at Temple University. He received a B.A. from Columbia University in 1963, where he was a member of the Philolexian Society, and a Ph.D. from the University of Chicago in 1972; while a graduate student, he visited India as a Fulbright Fellow. He joined the Temple faculty in 1972. As well as his faculty position at Temple, Spodek was the treasurer of the World History Association and a member of the editorial board of History Compass.

Spodek specialized in Indian history, and in particular on the city of Ahmedabad. He was the author of The World's History, a college textbook that is sometimes also used for high school Advanced Placement history courses and that has gone through four editions. He won Temple's Great Teacher Award in 1993.

== Selected works ==
- "Pluralist Politics in British India: The Cambridge Cluster of Historians of Modern India", American Historical Review, 84(3): 688-707. 1979.
- "Studying the history of urbanization in India", Journal of Urban History, 6(3), 251-295. 1980.
- "From Gandhi to violence: Ahmedabad's 1985 riots in historical perspective", Modern Asian Studies, 23(4): 765-795. 1989.
- "In the Hindutva laboratory: Pogroms and politics in Gujarat, 2002", Modern Asian Studies, 44(2), 349-399. 2010.
- The World's History. Boston: Prentice Hall. 4th edition.
- Ahmedabad: Shock City of Twentieth-century India. New Delhi: Orient BlackSwan. 2012. ISBN 978-81-250-4661-5
