= Africa and the Victorians =

1961 book by Ronald Robinson and John Andrew Gallagher

- Author: Ronald Robinson and John Andrew Gallagher, with Alice Denny.
- Published: 1961
- Publisher: Macmillan & Company
- ISBN: 978-0-333-05552-6

Africa and the Victorians: The Official Mind of Imperialism is a 1961 book by Ronald Robinson and John Andrew Gallagher, with contributions from Robinson's wife, Alice Denny. The book argues that British involvement in the Scramble for Africa occurred largely to secure its empire, specifically routes to India and was a strategic decision. It was well received upon publication and is considered an influential work.

== Content ==
Ronald Robinson and John Andrew Gallagher worked at the University of Cambridge and shared an interest in the origins of the British Empire. Their work challenged "traditional interpretations" of imperialism and British expansionism. The two published "The Imperialism of Free Trade" in The Economic History Review in 1953 arguing there was a common thread between British imperialism throughout the 19th century. The two began work on a book in the context of the Suez Crisis of 1956 with contributions from Robinson's wife, Alice Denny. Africa and the Victorians was published in 1961 by Macmillan & Company. The edition published in England was subtitled The Official Mind of Imperialism, while in the US it was subtitled The Climax of Imperialism in the Dark Continent. Denny's contributions to the book played a major role in it being published.

The book covers British foreign policy as it relates to the Scramble for Africa in the late 19th century, focusing on that nation's expansion. The authors argue that the development of a formal British empire was strategically needed in the face of rising nationalism among inhabitants of regions Britain controlled. According to Robinson and Gallagher, imperialism "began as little more than a defensive reaction to the Irish, the Egyptian and the Transvaal rebellions" from the 1860s to the 1880s.

Africa and the Victorians offers "an indictment of any exclusively economic interpretation of the scramble for Africa" and sought to "bring into the open the conceptions, prejudices and interests" behind Britain's expansion. The central argument of the book is that it initially became beneficial for Britain to expand in Africa largely in order to secure their lucrative colony of India through the Anglo-French occupation of Egypt (1882) and the surrounding regions. British expansion in South Africa, according to Robinson and Gallagher, was motivated by the urging of expansionists such as Cecil Rhodes, and in response to the First Boer War (1880–81). South Africa also marked another possible route to India that Britain sought to defend. West Africa held little economic potential and was not of interest to Britain.

== Reception ==
Upon publication, the book received many reviews, and Robinson and Gallagher's work has been described as having far reaching influence. In his introduction to the 1998 The Oxford History of the British Empire, Wm. Roger Louis described their work as creating "a conceptual revolution." The book provided a context of expansion that focused on events outside of Europe.

The Canadian Historical Review declared that "Students of African or imperial history must read this book, and will enjoy reading it." A reviewer in The Journal of Modern History described it as a "remarkable book". They described the book as "rewriting" the history and interpretation of the scramble. Writing in The Economic History Review, D. K. Fieldhouse felt that the authors made a "very strong case" but felt they attributed too much of the scramble as a response to British expansion in Egypt. He also felt that the book felt repetitive at times, but was generally a "very impressive piece of research and argument...perhaps the sanest and most convincing interpretation yet published of the real character of British imperialism in the late 19th century."

A reviewer in The American Historical Review felt that the argument presented would be "startling" to African nationalists and economic determinists but was well supported and persuasive, concluding it was a "well written, stimulating essay." George Shepperson reviewed the book in The English Historical Review, concluding that the book was more realistic than others of its genre, considering it an important would that was "certain to be influential" but questioning the heavy reliance on official records, which he felt often omitted details or context, and saying that its theorizing represented the weakest parts. Shepperson concluded that the book was generally excellent. A reviewer in Transition called the book "very important... but also extremely entertaining [and] delightfully written".

== Bibliography ==
- Imperialism : the Robinson and Gallagher controversy. New York : New Viewpoints. 1976. ISBN 978-0-531-05375-1.
- The Oxford History of the British Empire. Vol. 5. Oxford University Press. 1998. ISBN 978-0-19-820562-3.
