= Norman Etherington =

Australian professor of history

Norman Etherington AM
- Born: 27 June 1941 (age 85); Port Townsend, Washington, US
- Occupation: Historian
- Known for: Research on European imperialism, Christian missions, and Southern Africa
- Board member of: Australian Historical Association (President); African Studies Association of Australasia and the Pacific (President); Adelaide City Council; Heritage Council of Western Australia, National Trust of Western Australia (Council); National Trust of South Australia (President)

Academic background
- Education: Yale University (BA, MA, PhD)
- Thesis: (1971)

Academic work
- Discipline: History
- Sub-discipline: European imperialism, Southern African history
- Institutions: University of Adelaide, University of Western Australia
- Main interests: European imperialism, Christian missions, Southern Africa

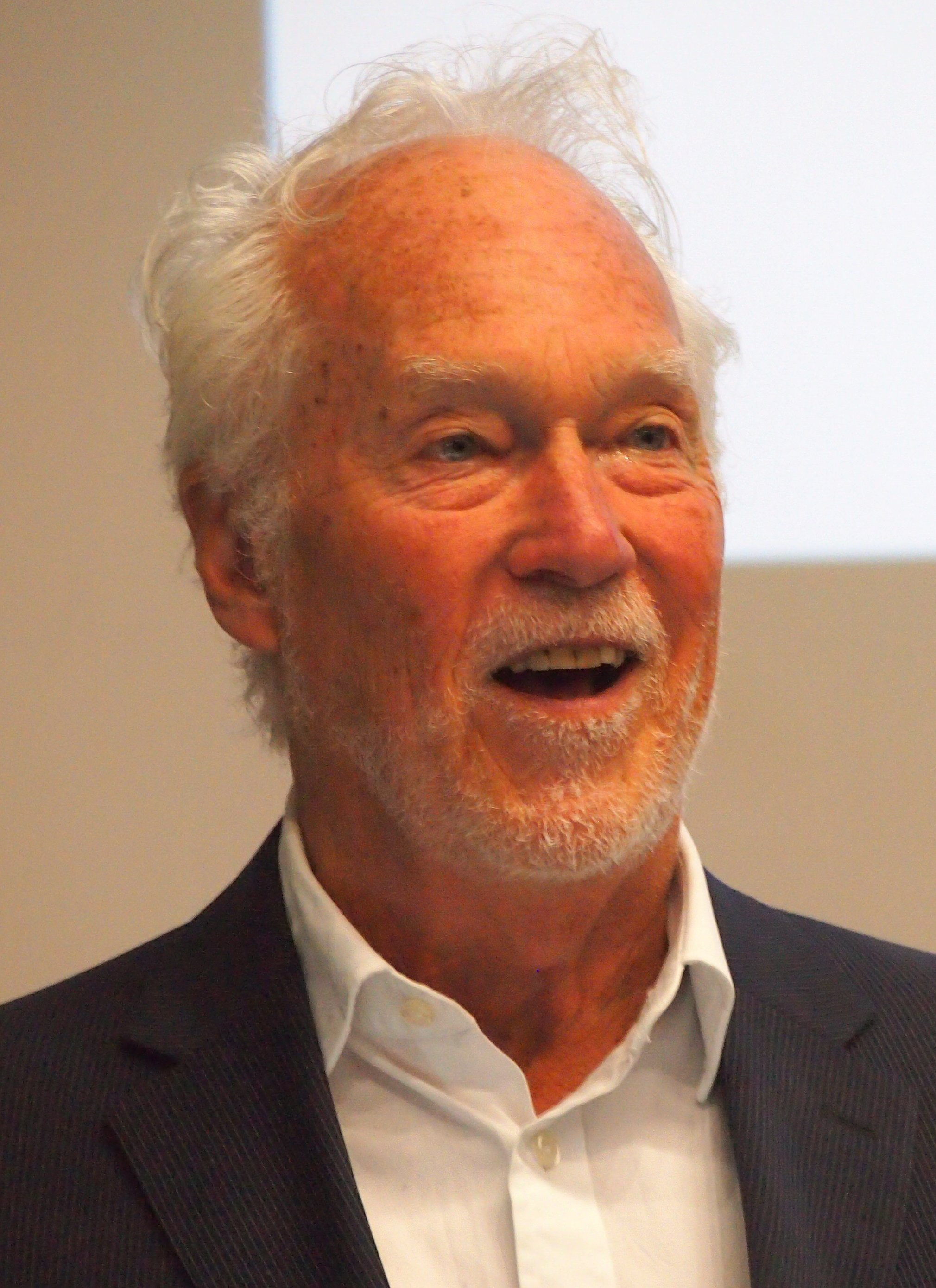
Norman Etherington in 2021

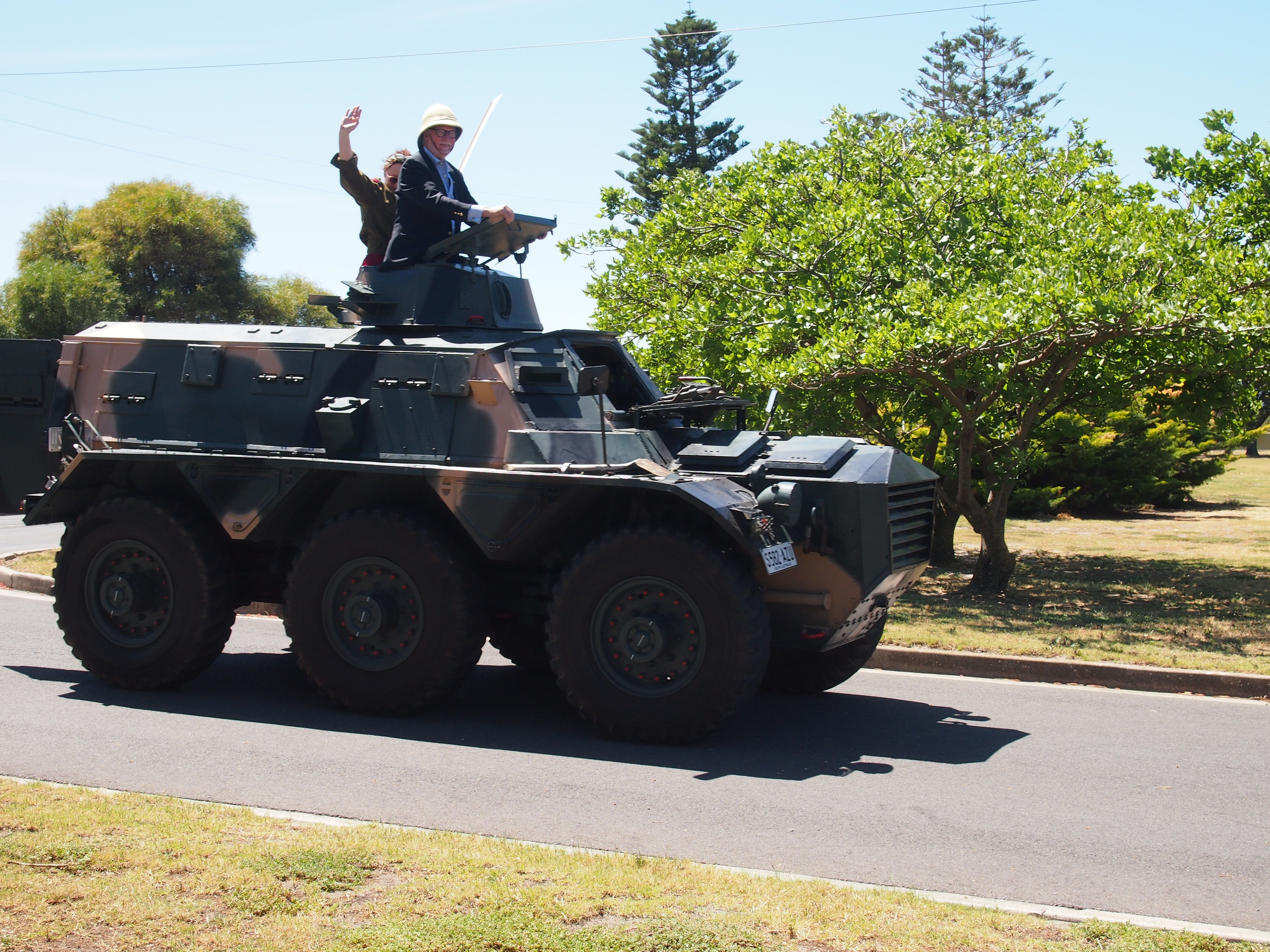
Norman Etherington in an Alvis Saracen at a community protest against the sale of Fort Largs, 2014

Norman Etherington AM is emeritus Professor of History at the University of Western Australia, who is best known for his published research on the history of European imperialism, Christian missions and Southern Africa. He is a past president of the Australian Historical Association and the African Studies Association of Australasia and the Pacific. Outside of academia, he is best known for his involvement with heritage conservation, having served on the Adelaide City Council, the Heritage Council of Western Australia, the Council of the National Trust of Western Australia, and as president of the National Trust of South Australia.

== Early life and education ==
Norman Etherington was born 27 June 1941 at Port Townsend, Washington. He was educated at Mount Vernon High School, Mount Vernon Washington and Yale University, BA 1963, MA 1966, PhD 1971.

== Academic career ==
Etherington joined the History department at the University of Adelaide as a lecturer in 1968.

In 1975, he became a member of the American Historical Association.

In 1988 he was appointed to the Chair of History at the University of Western Australia, where he taught until retirement in 2007. He served in various administrative capacities on the Academic Board and the Academic Council. From 1995 to 1997 he was president of the Australian Historical Association. He was elected a fellow of the Royal Historical Society (UK) in 1988, the Academy of the Social Sciences in Australia in 1993 and the Royal Geographical Society (UK) in 2008.

His published books, journal articles and conference papers mostly concern European imperialism in theory and practice, Christian missions, and British rule in Africa, Oceania, and the Caribbean. He has also served on the editorial boards of several academic journals. He held visiting appointments at the Institute of Commonwealth Studies (1974,1989), the University of Cape Town (1981,1993), Columbia University (1984), Humanities Research Center, Australian National University (1995), Institut des Civilisations Comparées, Université de Provence, Aix-en-Provence (1995–96) and Rhodes University (2002). He was a non-resident Research Associate at the University of South Africa from 2001 to 2021.

== Books ==
- 1978. Preachers, Peasants and Politics in Southeast Africa 1835-1880. London: Royal Historical Society.
- 1984. Rider Haggard. Boston: G. K. Hall.
- 1984. Theories of Imperialism: War, Conquest and Capital. London: Croom Helm.
- 1984. Time Gentlemen, Please!!: The Story of the Fight to Save the Aurora Hotel, 1983 Adelaide: Kitchener Press.
- 1991. The Annotated She (edited, extensively annotated and introduced). Bloomington: Indiana University Press.
- 1992. Peace, Politics and Violence in the New South Africa (edited and introduced). Oxford: Hans Zell.
- 2001. The Great Treks: The Transformation of Southern Africa, 1815-1854. London: Longman.
- 2005. Missions and Empire (edited, introduced, and contributed one chapter). Oxford: Oxford University Press.
- 2007. Mapping Colonial Conquest: Australia and Southern Africa (edited, introduced and contributed 3 chapters). Perth: UWA Press.
- 2010. Grappling with the Beast: Indigenous Southern African Responses to Colonialism:1840-1930 (edited with Peter Limb and Peter Midgeley; contributed one chapter).
- 2015. Indigenous Evangelists and Questions of Authority in the British Empire, 1750-1940, co-authored with Peggy Brock, Gareth Griffiths and Jacqueline Van Gent. Leiden: Brill.
- 2016. Big Game Hunter: A Biography of Frederick Courteney Selous. Ramsbury, Wiltshire: Robert Hale.
- 2017. The 2016 South Australian Community Consultation on Local Heritage. Adelaide: National Trust of South Australia.
- 2017. Imperium of the Soul: The Political and Aesthetic Imagination of Edwardian Imperialists. Manchester: Manchester University Press.
- 2021. A 50 Year Plan for Metropolitan Adelaide. Adelaide: National Trust of South Australia.
