= David Fieldhouse =

British historian

David Kenneth Fieldhouse, FBA (7 June 1925 – 28 October 2018) was an English historian of the British Empire. Fieldhouse was born to missionary parents in Mussoorie, northern India. He was sent to England for his education at Dean Close School, Cheltenham, from 1938 to 1943. Fieldhouse then completed naval service, before reading history at The Queen's College, Oxford.

Between 1981 and 1992, Fieldhouse held the Vere Harmsworth Professorship of Imperial and Naval History at the University of Cambridge. Arguably the world's "leading imperial economic historian" he is most well known for his book, Economics and Empire, 1830–1914 (1973), which offered a trenchant account of how political and strategic factors, rather than economic impulses, comprised the primary motors of European imperial expansion.

Fieldhouse was a critic of the theories of imperialism put forward in the early 20th century by John A. Hobson and Lenin. He argued that they used superficial arguments and weak evidence. Fieldhouse said that the "obvious driving force of British expansion since 1870" came from explorers, missionaries, engineers, and empire-minded politicians. They had little interest in financial investments. Hobson's approach was to say that faceless financiers manipulated everyone else. "The final determination rests with the financial power." Lenin made the argument that capitalism was in its last stages and had been taken over by monopolists. They were no longer dynamic and sought to maintain profits by even more intensive exploitation of protected markets. Fieldhouse rejected these arguments as unfounded speculation.

During the course of his career he held academic posts at the University of Canterbury, Oxford University, and Cambridge University. Upon his retirement from Cambridge in 1992 his former students and colleagues published a festschrift entitled, Managing the Business of Empire: Essays in Honour of David Fieldhouse.

Fieldhouse remained an active Emeritus Fellow of Jesus College, Cambridge in later life. He died in October 2018 at the age of 93.

== Selected bibliography ==
- "'Imperialism': An Historiographical Revision1." Economic History Review (1961) 14#2 pp: 187–209. online
- Colonial Empires: A Comparative Survey from the Eighteenth Century (1966)
- Economics and Empire, 1830–1914 (1973)
- Colonialism, 1870–1945: An Introduction (1981)
- "Can Humpty‐Dumpty be put together again? Imperial history in the 1980s." The Journal of Imperial and Commonwealth History (1984) 12#2 pp: 9-23. online
- Black Africa, 1945–80: Economic Decolonization & Arrested Development (1986)
- Merchant Capital and Economic Decolonization: The United Africa Company, 1929-87 (1994)
- The West and the Third World: Trade, Colonialism, Dependence and Development (Oxford: Blackwell, 1999)
- Western Imperialism in the Middle East, 1914–1958 (2006)

== See also ==
- Historiography of the British Empire
- John Andrew Gallagher
- Eric Thomas Stokes
- Christopher Bayly
