= Jack Gallagher (historian) =

British historian

Jack Gallagher FBA
- Born: John Andrew Gallagher; 1 April 1919; Birkenhead, England
- Died: 5 March 1980 (aged 60); Cambridge, England

Academic background
- Education: Trinity College, Cambridge

Academic work
- Discipline: History
- School or tradition: Cambridge School
- Institutions: Trinity College, Cambridge; Balliol College, Oxford
- Doctoral students: Christopher Bayly; Keith Jeffery; Paul Kennedy
- Notable works: "The Imperialism of Free Trade" (1953); Africa and the Victorians (1961)
- Notable ideas: Official mind
- Influenced: Wm. Roger Louis

John Andrew Gallagher FBA (1 April 1919 – 5 March 1980), known as Jack Gallagher, was an historian of the British Empire who between 1963 and 1970 held the Beit Professorship of Commonwealth History at the University of Oxford and from 1971 until his death was the Vere Harmsworth Professor of Imperial and Naval History at the University of Cambridge.

== Early life and career ==
Gallagher was born in Birkenhead on 1 April 1919. His father was Irish. After schooling at the Birkenhead Institute, he proceeded to Trinity College, Cambridge, as a history scholar, and with the outbreak of the Second World War he joined the Royal Tank Regiment, eventually serving in Italy, Greece, and North Africa. After the end of the war, Gallagher returned to Cambridge to complete his studies and was elected a Fellow of Trinity College in 1948.

== Scholarship ==
Gallagher's influential work Africa and the Victorians: The Official Mind of Imperialism, was co-authored with Ronald Robinson (with the help of Alice Denny) and first published in 1961. This was preceded by a widely read article, also co-authored with Robinson, "The Imperialism of Free Trade". Published in 1953, the latter constitutes a groundbreaking essay among theorists of imperial expansion and "is reputedly the most cited historical article ever published".

Robinson and Gallagher argued that the New Imperialism of the 1880s, especially the Scramble for Africa, was a continuation of a long-term policy in which informal empire, based on the principles of free trade, was favoured over formal imperial control. The article helped launch the Cambridge School of historiography.

Reviewing the debate in the end of the 20th century, historian Martin Lynn argues that Gallagher and Robinson exaggerated the impact. He says that Britain achieved its goal of increasing its economic interests in many areas "but the broader goal of 'regenerating' societies and thereby creating regions tied as 'tributaries' to British economic interests was not attained." The reasons were

the aim to reshape the world through free trade and its extension overseas owed more to the misplaced optimism of British policy-makers and their partial views of the world than to an understanding of the realities of the mid-19th century globe.... the volumes of trade and investment... the British were able to generate remained limited.... Local economies and local regimes proved adept at restricting the reach of British trade and investment. Local impediments to foreign inroads, the inhabitants' low purchasing power, the resilience of local manufacturing, and the capabilities of local entrepreneurs meant that these areas effectively resisted British economic penetration.

In 1974, he delivered both the Ford Lectures at Oxford on the theme of the Decline, Revival and Fall of the British Empire) as well as the Wiles Lectures at Queen's University Belfast.

In addition to being one of the most prominent theorists of imperial expansion, he also ensured a considerable legacy as a result of the large numbers of doctoral students at both Cambridge and Oxford whose work he either supervised or strongly influenced. Three of the more prominent ones include Christopher Bayly, Paul Kennedy, and Wm. Roger Louis.

When a team of students of Trinity College, Cambridge, won University Challenge in 1974 (Christopher Vane, Frederick "Wynn" Jolley, Simon Schaffer, and Paul Hopkins), Gallagher was part of a Trinity fellows team (with Sir James Lighthill, John Bradfield, Tony Weir), which defeated them in the annual televised contest between the series champions and a team of fellows from the same institution.

== Personal life ==
Gallagher was strongly-left wing in his youth, and whilst an undergraduate at Cambridge he was a convenor of the 'colonial group' of the university's Communist Party. The historian Eric Hobsbawm, a fellow student communist, described Gallagher as "brilliant, original and self-destructive", claiming that he never got out of bed before midday.

Gallagher, who remained unmarried, died from heart failure and kidney failure in Cambridge on 5 March 1980.

== Works ==
- Africa and the Victorians: The Climax of Imperialism in the Dark Continent written with Ronald Robinson and Alice Denny (London, Macmillan, 1961) and Africa and the Victorians: The Climax of Imperialism in the Dark Continent (New York, St Martin's Press, 1961)
- The Decline, Revival and Fall of the British Empire. The Ford Lectures and Other Essays edited by Anil Seal (Cambridge, Cambridge University Press, 1982)

== See also ==
- Historiography of the British Empire

Academic offices
Preceded by Vincent T. Harlow	Beit Professor of Commonwealth History; 1963–1971	Succeeded by Ronald Robinson
Preceded by Edwin Rich	Vere Harmsworth Professor of Imperial and Naval History; 1971–1981	Succeeded by David Fieldhouse
Preceded by Rodney Hilton	Ford Lecturer; 1973–1974	Succeeded by Joan Thirsk
