= Ronald Robinson =

Ronald "Robbie" Edward Robinson, CBE, DFC, FBA (3 September 1920 – 19 June 1999) was a distinguished historian of the British Empire who between 1971 and 1987 held the Beit Professorship of Commonwealth History at the University of Oxford.

After schooling at Battersea Grammar School, he proceeded to St. John's College, Cambridge, as a History Scholar in 1938 and with the outbreak of the Second World War he joined the Royal Air Force, eventually spending most of his armed service in Africa. After the end of the war, between 1947 and 1949, Robinson worked on the subject of "trusteeship" for his doctorate at Cambridge. He was subsequently elected a Fellow of St. John's College, Cambridge, in 1949.

Robinson's extraordinarily influential work, Africa and the Victorians: The Official Mind of Imperialism, was co-authored with John Gallagher (with the help of his wife Alice Denny) and first published in 1961. The latter work had been preceded by a widely read article – also co-authored with Gallagher – entitled, "The Imperialism of Free Trade". Published in 1953, the latter constitutes a groundbreaking essay among theorists of imperial expansion and "is reputedly the most cited historical article ever published".

Upon Robinson's retirement from Oxford in 1987, a book of essays entitled Theory and Practice in the History of European Expansion Overseas was published in his honour.
