= Richard Drayton =

British historian and academic (born 1964)

Richard Drayton FRHS
- Born: 1964 (age 61–62); Guyana
- Occupations: Historian and academic
- Parent(s): Kathleen (née McCracken) and Harold Drayton
- Awards: Morris D. Forkosch Prize; Philip Leverhulme Prize; Alexander von Humboldt Prize

Academic background
- Education: Harrison College; Harvard University; Balliol College, Oxford; Yale University
- Doctoral advisor: Paul Kennedy

Richard Drayton FRHistS (born 1964) is a Guyana-born historian and Professor of Imperial and Global History (formerly known as Rhodes Professor of Imperial History) at King's College London.

== Biography ==
=== Early years and education ===
Richard Drayton was born in Guyana in 1964, to parents Kathleen (née McCracken; 1930–2009) and Harold Drayton (1929–2018), and grew up in Barbados, where he migrated with his family in 1972. He went to school at Harrison College in Bridgetown, from which he left as a Barbados Scholar to Harvard University.

He was a graduate student at Balliol College, Oxford, as the Commonwealth Caribbean Rhodes Scholar, and at Yale University, where he wrote his doctoral dissertation under the direction of Paul Kennedy.

=== Academic career ===
From 1992, Drayton was a Research Fellow of St Catharine's College, Cambridge, returning to Oxford in 1994 to be Darby Fellow and Tutor in Modern History at Lincoln College. After 1998, he was Associate Professor of British History at the University of Virginia. From 2001 to 2009, he was University Senior Lecturer in Imperial and extra-European History since 1500, and Director of Graduate Training of the Faculty of History at the University of Cambridge and Fellow, Tutor, and Director of Studies in History at Corpus Christi College, Cambridge. In 2009, he was visiting professor of history at Harvard University, in 2012 at the Institute of World History of the Chinese Academy of Social Sciences, in 2013 he was Professeur Invité at the Ecole des Hautes Etudes en Sciences Sociales, and in 2015 was Distinguished Visiting Fellow of the Advanced Research Colloquium of the City University of New York. He was a Gresham College lecturer for 2019–2020.

In 2021-2022 academic year he was a part of the Berlin Global History Group.

In January 2022, King’s College London discontinued the Rhodes Professorship of Imperial History following a campaign led by Drayton. He raised concerns about the professorship’s association with Cecil Rhodes, a figure widely recognized for his role in British imperial expansion and colonial exploitation. He argued that maintaining a position named after Rhodes was inconsistent with the university’s commitment to diversity and historical accountability.

=== Other activities ===
In November 2010, he spoke on "Economic lies and cuts" at a student "occupation" organised by Cambridge Defend Education at Cambridge University, suggesting that austerity policies were unnecessary in Britain where the percentage of GDP going to servicing the National Debt when David Cameron and George Osborne came to power in May 2010 was "at the lowest level it had been since Lord Salisbury was at the Treasury" a hundred years earlier, and predicting that cuts in public spending would reduce aggregate demand and growth, and thus ultimately would increase the burden of public debt.

== Publications ==
Drayton is the author of Nature's Government: Science, Imperial Britain, and the "Improvement" of the World (Yale University Press, 2000), which received the Morris D. Forkosch Prize of the American Historical Association in 2001 as the best book in British and British Imperial History (1999–2001). In 2002, he was awarded the Philip Leverhulme Prize for Modern History.

As co-editor of the scholarly book series Cambridge Imperial and Post-Colonial Studies, he has commissioned and published more than 40 titles since 2006. He sits on the editorial board of the Journal of Imperial and Commonwealth History and of the Chinese Academy of Social Sciences journal World History Studies.

"Imperial History and the Human Future", his inaugural lecture as Rhodes Professor of Imperial History at King's College London, was published by History Workshop Journal in 2012.

Drayton has also written for national publications such as The Guardian, has appeared on BBC Radio and has frequently been invited by prestigious institutions to give lectures, including "Hybrid time: The Incomplete Victories of the Present Over the Past", Throckmorton Lecture at Lewis and Clark College (2007); "The Problem of the Hero in Caribbean History", 21st Elsa Goveia Lecture, University of the West Indies (2004); and "What happens when two ways of knowing meet?", the Elizabeth T. Kennan Lecture at Mount Holyoke College (2003).

== Awards and recognition ==
In 2001, Drayton received the Morris D. Forkosch Prize in British History from the American Historical Association for his book Nature’s Government. In 2002, he was awarded the Philip Leverhulme Prize for History. In 2021, Drayton received the Alexander von Humboldt Prize for his "lifetime research achievements".

== See also ==
- British Empire
- World history
- Paul Kennedy
- Christopher Bayly
- Wm. Roger Louis
- Peter James Marshall

== Bibliography ==
- Nature's Government: Science, Imperial Britain, and the "Improvement" of the World, New Haven, Conn.: Yale University Press, 2000.
