= The Oxford History of the British Empire =

History book on British Empire

Volume I of The Oxford History of the British Empire

The Oxford History of the British Empire is a five-volume history of the British Empire published by the Oxford University Press in 1998 and 1999. According to the publisher, the series "deals with the interaction of British and non-western societies from the Elizabethan era to the late twentieth century, aiming to provide a balanced treatment of the ruled as well as the rulers, and to take into account the significance of the Empire for the peoples of the British Isles". The editor-in-chief for the main series was Wm. Roger Louis.

In addition to the principal five volumes, the Oxford History of the British Empire also includes a spin-off "Companion Series" which "pursue themes that could not be covered adequately in the main series". 16 volumes have been published in the series since 2004.

== Volumes ==
=== The Main Series ===
The Oxford History of the British Empire comprises five edited volumes, tracing the history of the British Empire in a chronological manner:

- Volume I: The Origins of Empire: British Overseas Enterprise to the Close of the Seventeenth Century. 1998. Editor: Nicholas Canny.
- Volume II: The Eighteenth Century. 1998. Editor: P.J. Marshall.
- Volume III: The Nineteenth Century. 1999. Editor: Andrew Porter.
- Volume IV: The Twentieth Century. 1999. Editors: Judith M. Brown and Wm. Roger Louis.
- Volume V: Historiography. 1999. Editor: Robin W. Winks.

=== The "Companion Series" ===
Besides the main series, the Oxford History of the British Empire (Companion Series) addresses a range of specific thematic or regional issues which fell outside the scope of the general volumes. They are mixed between monographs and edited volumes. Published from 2004, the series includes:

- Ireland and the British Empire. 2004. Editor: Kevin Kenny.
- Black Experience and the Empire. 2004. Editors: Philip D. Morgan and Sean Hawkins.
- Gender and Empire. 2004. Editor: Philippa Levine.
- Missions and Empire. 2005. Editor: Norman Etherington.
- Environment and Empire. 2007. Authors: William Beinart and Lotte Hughes.
- Australia's Empire. 2008. Editors: Deryck Schreuder and Stuart Ward.
- Canada and the British Empire. 2010. Editor: Phillip Buckner.
- Settlers and Expatriates: Britons over the Seas. 2010. Editor: Robert Bickers.
- Migration and Empire. 2010. Authors: Marjory Harper and Stephen Constantine.
- Scotland and the British Empire. 2011. Editors: John M. MacKenzie and T. M. Devine.
- Britain's Experience of Empire in the Twentieth Century. 2011. Editor: Andrew Thompson.
- India and the British Empire. 2012. Editors: Douglas M. Peers and Nandini Gooptu.
- British North America in the Seventeenth and Eighteenth Centuries. 2013. Editor: Stephen Foster
- Winding up the British Empire in the Pacific Islands. 2014. Author: W. David McIntyre.
- Architecture and Urbanism in the British Empire. 2016. Editor: G. A. Bremner.
- Islands and the British Empire in the Age of Sail. 2021. Editors: Douglas Hamilton and John McAleer.

== Reviews ==
Max Beloff, reviewing the first two volumes in History Today, praised them for their readability and was pleased that his worry that they would be too anti-imperialist had not been realised. Saul Dubow in H-Net noted the uneven quality of the chapters in volume III and also the difficulty of such an endeavour given the state of historiography of the British Empire and the impossibility of maintaining a triumphalist tone in the modern era. Dubow also felt that some of the authors had tended "to 'play safe', awed perhaps by the monumental nature of the enterprise".

Madhavi Kale of Bryn Mawr College, writing in Social History, also felt that the history took a traditional approach to the historiography of the empire and placed the English, and to a lesser extent the Scottish, Irish and Welsh at the centre of the account, rather than the subject peoples of the empire. Kale summed up her review of volumes III–V of the history by saying it represented "a disturbingly revisionist project that seeks to neutralize ... the massive political and military brutality and repression" of the empire.

== See also ==
- Historiography of the British Empire
