= British Studies Seminar, University of Texas at Austin =

British Studies, officially the Faculty Seminar on British Studies is a weekly seminar at the University of Texas at Austin that has met continually since 1975. British Studies is directed by Wm. Roger Louis, a founding member of the seminar and a distinguished historian at the University of Texas. The seminar is sponsored by the British Studies Program at UT, a program that also appoints junior fellows annually from among UT's faculty, and offers Churchill Scholarships to graduate students and undergraduates. The seminar has produced a book series—with the Harry Ransom Humanities Research Center and I.B. Tauris of London— containing a selection of lectures delivered to the seminar: Adventures with Britannia (1995), More Adventures with Britannia (1998), Still More Adventures with Britannia (2003), Yet More Adventures with Britannia (2005), Penultimate Adventures with Britannia (2008), and Ultimate Adventures with Britannia (2009).

The British Studies seminar is held in the Tom Lea Room of the Harry Ransom Humanities Research Center. "Imagine the setting," writes Wm. Roger Louis, the director. "Dark wood paneling, the occasional Topolski paintings of Evelyn Waugh and Graham Greene, and spacious glass windows. A magnificent seminar table overlooks a courtyard graced with live oaks and the scattered ashes of one of the founding members of the seminar. On arrival at the seminar, the participants help themselves to a glass of Tio Pepe or Dry Sack sherry, though teetotalers prefer cranberry juice. Sherry has come to symbolize the attitude. The seminar meets to examine in a civilized way whatever happens to be on the agenda, Scottish or Indian, Canadian or Jamaican, English or Australian. The discussion is civil, but sometimes grows a bit heated. What makes the debate engrossing is the clash of different perspectives—including those of lawyers, physicians, retired ambassadors, and others of the larger Austin community."

== Notable Seminar Lectures ==
A full list of all lectures is available in Burnt Orange Britannia

=== 1970s ===
Fall Semester 1976

- Paul Scott (novelist, London), "The Raj Quartet"
- Wm. Roger Louis (UT History), "Churchill, Roosevelt, and the Future of Dependent Peoples during the Second World War"
- Michael Holroyd (biographer, Dublin), "Two Biographies: Lytton Strachey and Augustus John"
- Max Beloff (former Gladstone Professor of Government, Oxford University, present principal of Buckingham College), "Imperial Sunset"
- Robin Winks (professor of history, Yale University), "British Empire-Commonwealth Studies"
- Anthony Kirk-Greene (Fellow of St. Antony's College, Oxford University), "The Origins and Aftermath of the Nigerian Civil War"

Spring Semester 1976

- Elspeth Rostow (UT dean of general and comparative studies), Standish Meacham (UT professor of history), and Alain Blayac (professor of English, University of Paris), "Reassessments of Evelyn Waugh"
- Jo Grimond (former leader of the Liberal Party), "Liberal Democracy in Britain"
- C. P. Snow (physicist, novelist), "Elite Education in England"
- Hans-Peter Schwartz (director of the Political Science Institute, Cologne University, and visiting fellow, Woodrow Wilson International Center for Scholars), "The Impact of Britain on German Politics and Society since the Second World War"
- B. K. Nehru (Indian High Commissioner, London, and former ambassador to the United States), "The Political Crisis in India"
- Robert A. Divine (UT professor of history), Harry J. Middleton (director, LBJ Library), and Wm. Roger Louis (UT history), "Declassification of Secret Documents: The British and American Experiences Compared"

Fall Semester 1976

- Ian Nish (professor of Japanese history, London School of Economics), "Anglo-American Naval Rivalry and the End of the Anglo-Japanese Alliance"
- Norman Sherry (professor of English, University of Lancaster), "Joseph Conrad and the British Empire"
- Sir Ronald Grierson (chairman, international advisory board, The Blackstone Group), "The Evolution of the British Economy since 1945"
- William Todd (UT Kerry Professor of English History and Culture), Walt Rostow (UT professor of history and economics), and James McKie (UT dean of social and behavioral sciences), "Adam Smith after 200 Years"

Spring Semester 1977

- Samuel H. Beer (professor of government, Harvard University), "Reflections on British Politics"
- David Fieldhouse (Fellow of Nuffield College, Oxford), "Decolonization and the Multinational Corporations
- Gordon A. Craig (Wallace Professor of Humanities, Stanford University), "England and Europe on the Eve of the Second World War"
- John Lehmann (British publisher and writer), "Publishing Under the Bombs - The Hogarth Press during World War II"
- Dick Taverne (former M.P.), "The Mood of Britain: Misplaced Gloom or Blind Complacency?"
- James B. Crowley (professor of history, Yale University), Lloyd C. Gardner (professor of history, Rutgers University), Akira Iriye (professor of history, University of Chicago), and Wm. Roger Louis, "The Origins of World War II in the Pacific"
- Rosemary Murray (vice-chancellor of Cambridge University), "Higher Education in England"

Fall Semester 1977

- Lewis Hoffacker (former US ambassador), "The Katanga Crisis: British and other Connections"
- Michael Fraser, Lord Fraser of Kilmorack (chairman of the Conservative Party Organization), "The Tory Tradition of British Politics"
- Albert Hourani (director, Middle East Centre, Oxford University), "The Myth of T. E. Lawrence"
- J. D. B. Miller (professor of international relations, Australia National University), "The Collapse of the British Empire"

Spring Semester 1978

- Stephen Koss (professor of history, Columbia University), "The British Press: Press Lords, Politicians, and Principles"
- John House (professor of geography, Oxford University), "The Rhodesian Crisis"
- Stephen Spender (English poet and writer), "Britain and the Spanish Civil War"
- David C. Goss (Australian Consul General), "Wombats and Wivveroos"
- Leon Epstein (professor of political Science, University of Wisconsin), "Britain and the Suez Crisis of 1956"
- Peter Stansky (professor of history, Stanford University), "George Orwell and the Spanish Civil War"
- Norman Sherry (professor of English, Lancaster University), "Graham Greene and Latin America"
- Martin Blumenson (Office of the Chief of Military History, Department of the Army), "The Ultra Secret"

Fall Semester 1978

- W. H. Morris-Jones (director, Commonwealth Studies Institute, University of London), "Power and Inequality in Southeast Asia"
- John Charles Hatch, Lord Hatch (British Labour Politician), "The Labour Party and Africa"
- M. R. Masani (Indian writer), "Gandhi and Gandhism"
- A. W. Coates (economics), "The Professionalization of the British Civil Service"
- John Clive (professor of history and literature, Harvard University), "Great Historians of the Nineteenth Century"
- Geoffrey Best (University of Sussex), "Flightpath to Dresden: British Strategic Bombing in the Second World War"
- Gilbert Chase (American music historian), "The British Musical Invasion of America"

Spring Semester 1979

- Paul M. Kennedy (East Anglia University, visiting professor of history, Princeton), "The Contradiction between British Strategic Policy and Economic Policy in the Twentieth Century"
- Richard Rive (South African writer, Fulbright Fellow), "Olive Schreiner and the South African Nation"
- Charles P. Kindleberger (professor of economics, Massachusetts Institute of Technology), "Lord Zuckerman and the Second World War"
- John Press (English poet), "English Poets and Postwar Society"
- Richard Ellmann (Goldsmiths' Professor of English Literature, Oxford University), "Writing a Biography of Joyce"
- Michael Finlayson (Scottish dramatist), "Contemporary British Theatre"
- Lawrence Stone (professor of history, Institute of Advanced Study, Princeton University), "Family, Sex, and Marriage in England"
- C. P. Snow, "Reflections on the Two Cultures"
- Theodore Zeldin (Oxford University), "Are the British More or Less European than the French?"
- Michael Holroyd (British biographer), "George Bernard Shaw"
- John Wickman (director, Eisenhower Library), "Eisenhower and the British"

Fall Semester 1979

- Sir Michael Tippett (British composer), "Moving into Aquarius"
- Barry C. Higman (professor of history, University of the West Indies), "West Indian Emigres and the British Empire"
- Peter Flawn (president of UT), "An Appreciation of Charles Dickens"

=== 1980s ===
Spring Semester 1980
