= Loncke =

Loncke is a surname of Dutch origin. Notable people with the surname include:

- Gérard Loncke (1905–1979), Belgian cyclist
- Jacob Lambrechtsz. Loncke (1580–1644), Dutch painter
- Joycelynne Loncke, Guyanese academic
- Louis-Philippe Loncke (born 1977), Belgian adventurer
