= Rhodes Professor of Imperial History =

Chair at King's College London

The Rhodes Professorship of Imperial History was one of the senior professorships in history at King's College London. Endowed by the Rhodes Trust in 1919, it was the second oldest academic chair in its subject in the world after the Beit Professorship of Colonial History at Oxford (founded in 1905).

In January 2022, King's College London discontinued the Rhodes Professorship of Imperial History due to its associations with slavery and colonialism. The decision followed advocacy by Professor Richard Drayton, the chair's incumbent and a former Rhodes Scholar, who highlighted the university's historical financial ties to slavery. Specifically, he referenced Charles Pallmer, a plantation owner who donated significantly to King's College in the 19th century and profited from slave ownership in Jamaica.

The chair is now named Professor of Imperial and Global History.

== List of holders ==
- Arthur Percival Newton (1920–1938)
- Vincent T. Harlow (1938–1949)
- Gerald S. Graham (1949–1970)
- Peter James Marshall (1980–1993)
- Andrew Porter (1993–2008)
- Richard Drayton (2009–2022)
