= University of Georgetown =

University of Georgetown may refer to:

- Georgetown University, in Georgetown, Washington, D.C.
- University of Guyana, in Georgetown, Guyana
