= Juliette Sméralda =

French sociologist

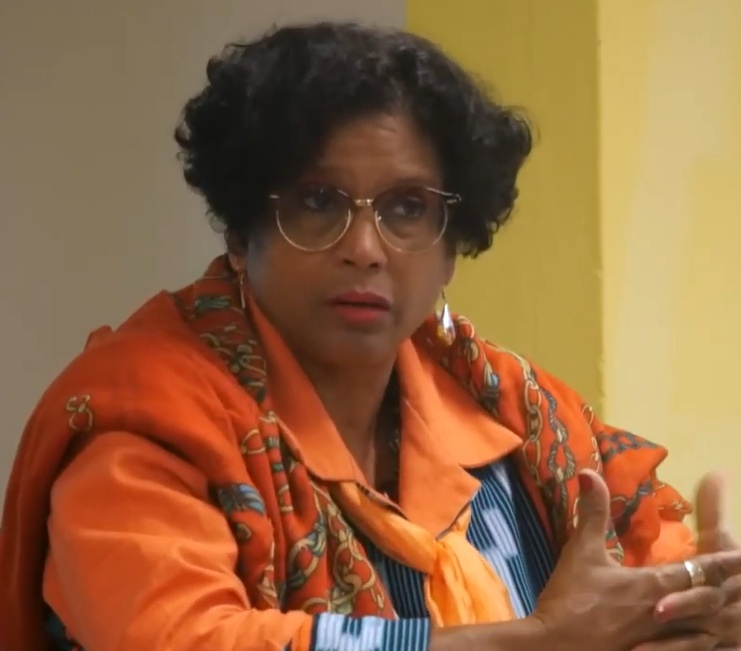
Juliette Sméralda

Juliette Sméralda is a French Afro-descendant sociologist.

She graduated from University of Paris-VII. She taught at University of the West Indies and University of Guyana,

== Publications ==
- Smeralda-Amon, Juliette; Sméralda, Juliette (1996). La question de l'immigration indienne dans son environnement socio-économique martiniquais, 1848-1900 (in French). Paris, France: Editions L'Harmattan. ISBN 978-2-7384-4442-4.
- Sméralda, Juliette (2004). Peau noire, cheveu crépu (in French). Jasor. ISBN 978-2-912594-45-7.
- Sméralda, Juliette (2008). Du cheveu défrisé au cheveu crépu (in French). Paris: Editions Anibwe. ISBN 978-2-916121-04-8.
- Sméralda, Juliette (2008). L'Indo-Antillais entre noirs et békés (in French). Paris: Editions L'Harmattan. ISBN 978-2-296-06413-3. OCLC 257561193.
- Sméralda, Juliette (2009). 2009 [Deux mille neuf], Guadeloupe Martinique (in French). Fort-de-France (Martinique): K éd. ISBN 978-2-918141-04-4.
- Guadeloupe Martinique, des sociétés en révolte. Morphologie d'un conflit social. Kéditions, mars 2009.
- Sméralda, Juliette (2008). La société martiniquaise entre ethnicité et citoyenneté (in French). Paris: Editions L'Harmattan. ISBN 978-2-296-06414-0. OCLC 260224729.
- Smeralda-Amon, Juliette; Sméralda, Juliette (2002). La racisation des relations intergroupes, ou, La problématique de la couleur (in French). Paris: Editions L'Harmattan. ISBN 978-2-7475-2746-0.
- Sméralda, Juliette (2011). Socio logiques (in French). Paris: Editions Publibook. ISBN 978-2-7483-6018-9.
- Sméralda, Juliette (2012). Philibert Duféal (in French). Paris: Editions L'Harmattan. ISBN 978-2-296-99649-6.
- Sméralda, Juliette (2013). 28 jours à la dérive (in French). Exbrayat. ISBN 978-2-915390-82-7.
- Sméralda, Juliette (2021). La poupée d'Isis (in French). Paris: MedouNeter. ISBN 978-2-37458-012-8.
- Sméralda, Juliette (2013). Le trempage (in French). L'auteur. ISBN 978-2-9535699-4-0.
- Sméralda, Juliette (2016-07-15). La Culture de l'entraide (in French). Saint-Denis: Editions Publibook. ISBN 978-2-7539-0348-7.
- Sméralda, Juliette (2016). Albert Auguste alias Albè Ti Sirè (in French). ISBN 978-2-9535699-6-4.
- Sméralda, Juliette (2021). La poupée d'Isis (in French). Paris: MedouNeter. ISBN 978-2-37458-012-8.
