= Locksley Hall =

Poem by Alfred, Lord Tennyson

- by Alfred Tennyson
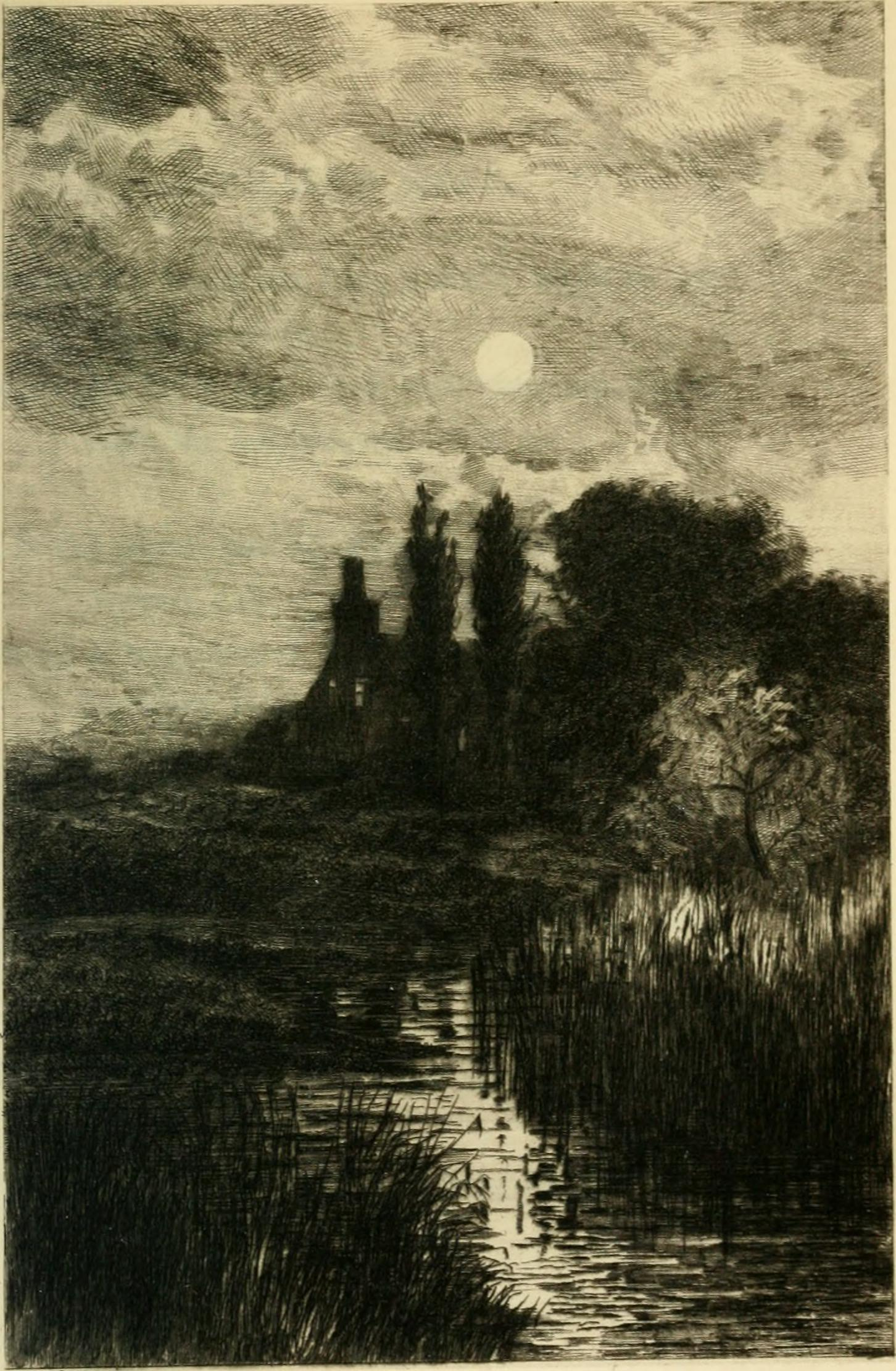
- Locksley Hall (illustrated)
- Written: 1835
- First published in: Poems
- Country: United Kingdom
- Language: English
- Meter: Trochaic octameter
- Publication date: 1842
- Lines: 194

"Locksley Hall" is a poem written by Alfred Tennyson in 1835 and published in his 1842 collection of Poems. It narrates the emotions of a rejected suitor upon coming to his childhood home, an apparently fictional Locksley Hall, though in fact Tennyson was a guest of the Arundel family in their stately home named Loxley Hall, in Staffordshire, where he spent much of his time writing whilst on his visits.

According to Tennyson, the poem represents "young life, its good side, its deficiencies, and its yearnings". Tennyson's son Hallam recalled that his father said the poem was inspired by Sir William Jones's prose translation of the Arabic Mu'allaqat.

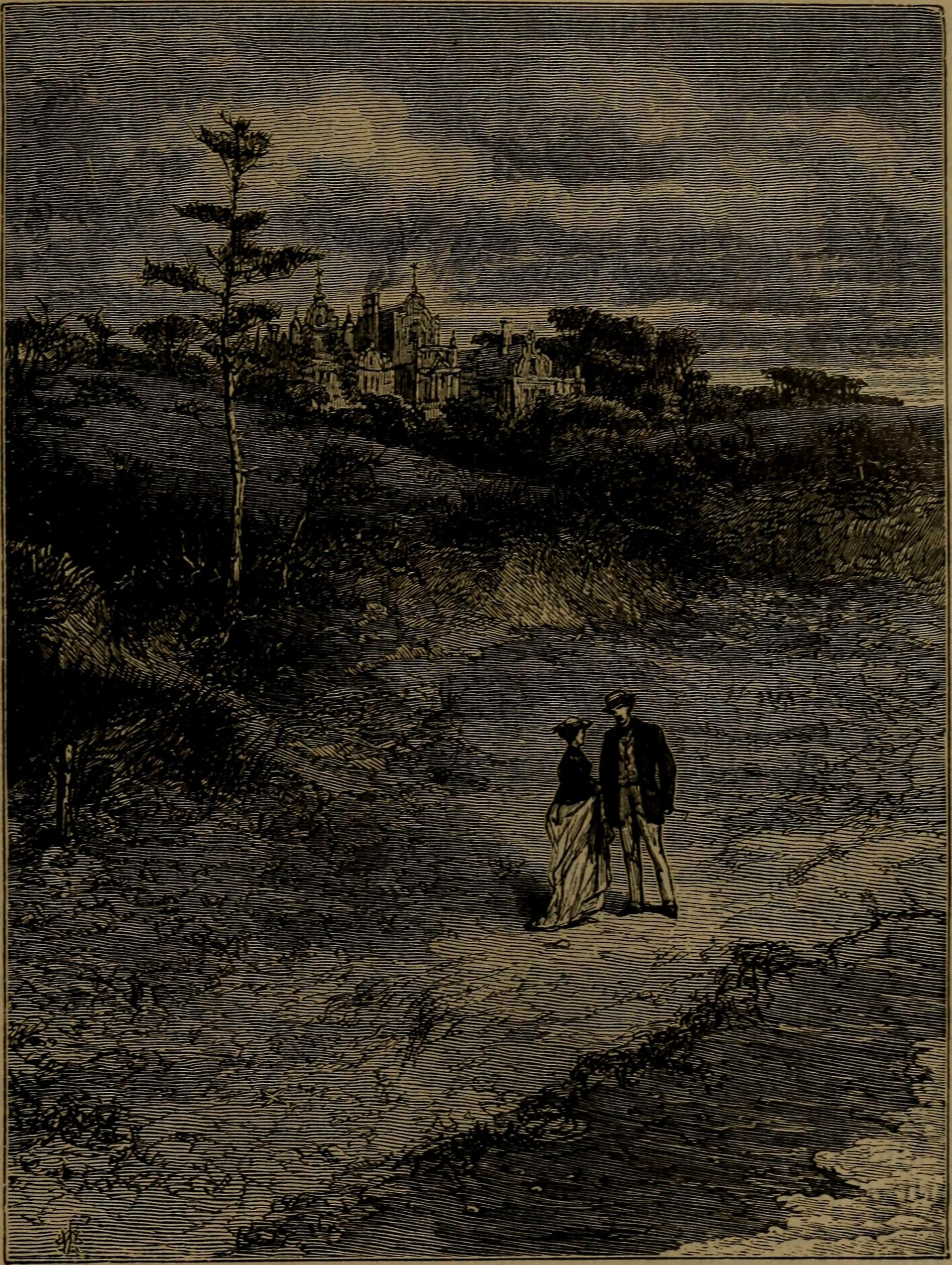
Locksley Hall (illustrated)

== Poetic form ==
"Locksley Hall" is a dramatic monologue written as a set of 97 rhyming couplets. Each line follows a modified version of trochaic octameter in which the last unstressed syllable has been eliminated; moreover, there is generally a caesura, whether explicit or implicit, after the first four trochees in the line. Each couplet is separated as its own stanza. The University of Toronto library identifies this form as "the old 'fifteener' line," quoting Tennyson, who claimed it was written in trochaics because the father of his friend Arthur Hallam suggested that the English liked the meter. The meter is reminiscent of that of the Nibelungenlied.

== Plot summary ==
The poem opens with the unnamed protagonist asking his friends to continue ahead and leave him alone to muse about the past and the future. He reveals that the place he has stopped at is called Locksley Hall, and he spent his childhood there. The rest of the poem, though written as rhymed metered verse, follows the stream of consciousness of its protagonist as an interior monologue. The protagonist struggles to reach some sort of catharsis on his childhood feelings.

In his monologue, the protagonist begins with fond memories of his childhood sweetheart, but those memories quickly lead to a burst of anger as he relates that the object of his affections abandoned him due to her parents' disapproval. He proceeds to offer a biting criticism of her husband who supplanted him in her affections, interspersed with personal reflection. This criticism is only really interrupted when he reflects that she will eventually have a child, and will be more concerned with her child than about the protagonist. The protagonist promptly continues his angry tirade, this time directed at the mother–child relationship.

The protagonist seeks escape from his depression by thinking he might immerse himself in some sort of work that would distract him, but finds this impossible, saying:

What is that which I should turn to, lighting upon days like these?
Every door is barr'd with gold, and opens but to golden keys.
Every gate is throng'd with suitors, all the markets overflow.
I have but an angry fancy; what is that which I should do?
I had been content to perish, falling on the foeman's ground,
When the ranks are roll'd in vapour, and the winds are laid with sound. (lines 99–104)

To be free of his depression, the protagonist continues into a grand description of the world to come, which he views as somewhat utopian. He relapses into anger briefly again when he hears a bugle call from his comrades telling him to hurry up.

Tennyson also predicts the rise of both civil aviation and military aviation in the following words:

Saw the heavens fill with commerce, argosies of magic sails,
Pilots of the purple twilight, dropping down with costly bales;
Heard the heavens fill with shouting, and there rain’d a ghastly dew
From the nations’ airy navies grappling in the central blue;

In the 20th century, Marshal of the Royal Air Force Sir John Slessor was to use Tennyson's expression "the central blue" as the title for his autobiography.

Much of the remainder of the poem is built up of an odd contrast between the beauty of civilisation and the beauty of the noble savage. He recalls the land where he was born (which he only says is somewhere in the Orient), and lovingly notes its lack of civilisation, describing it as "Summer isles of Eden" and "knots of Paradise."

In the end, he rejects the ideal of the noble savage, preferring the progress that civilisation has made. He also immediately thereafter turns his back on Locksley Hall, and marches forth to meet his comrades.

== Main character ==
Tennyson neither identifies the protagonist as a hero nor an anti-hero. The first half of the poem portrays him as a victim, but the second reveals that the protagonist holds views that are now recognised as remarkably racist and sexist; for example:

Weakness to be wroth with weakness! woman’s pleasure, woman’s pain--
Nature made them blinder motions bounded in a shallower brain:
Woman is the lesser man, and all thy passions, match’d with mine,
Are as moonlight unto sunlight, and as water unto wine (lines 149–152)

This is contrasted however with Tennyson's known feminist views, making a lot of his similar works a satire on men of the views he wrote about.

The narrator is also remarkably emotionally volatile through the poem. A good example occurs when he reminisces about his love for his cousin Amy; while recalling the wonderful experiences of love, he immediately becomes infuriated with her, even going so far as to throw insults:

Many an evening by the waters did we watch the stately ships,
And our spirits rush’d together at the touching of the lips.
O my cousin, shallow-hearted! O my Amy, mine no more!
O the dreary, dreary moorland! O the barren, barren shore! (lines 37–40)

In the narrator, Tennyson captures and displays many strong emotions—placid insightfulness, wonder, love, jealousy, despair, and eventually a sort of catharsis. Tennyson also uses the narrator to speculate on what the world might become: he presents a vision of human advance and conflict, of aerial commerce and combat, resolving in a world of federation, peace, and universal law. As many of these predictions have since been realised, Tennyson's work now seems prescient in many ways.

== Cultural influence ==
The line "Let the great world spin for ever down the ringing grooves of change." is inspired by his visit to the Opening of the Liverpool and Manchester Railway. He could not see the railcar's wheels due to the crowd, so he imagined that the wheels ran in grooves.

The historian Arthur Schlesinger Jr., writing in the Wall Street Journal, quoted the poem to illustrate "a noble dream" that modern US policy decisions may have been neglecting, and he also stated that Winston Churchill considered it "the most wonderful of modern prophecies" and Harry S. Truman carried the words in his wallet.

Elizabeth Gaskell mentions the poem in her 1853 novel Cranford. Lines from it are quoted in the 2007 adaptation of the novel.

Lord Tennyson wrote a sequel to Locksley Hall in 1886, "Locksley Hall Sixty Years After". In the sequel Tennyson describes how the industrialised nature of Britain has failed to fulfil the expectations of the poem of 1842.

In the popular 1888 utopian novel Looking Backward, by Edward Bellamy, the hero figure Julian West, awoken in the year 2000 after a long trance, remembers and reads four couplets from “For I dipt into the future…” and reflects how the world had become like the poem had envisioned, even while “in his old age, he (Tennyson) momentarily lost faith on his own prediction, as prophets in their hours of depression and doubt generally do; the words had remained eternal testimony to the seership of a poet’s heart, …” (chapter 13).

A line in "Locksley Hall" would inspire the title of the historian Paul Kennedy's 2006 book on the United Nations, The Parliament of Man: The Past, Present, and Future of the United Nations.

Locksley Hall was parodied - not without beauty, at least to the foxhunter - by the English MP William Bromley Davenport (1821–1884) in his "Lowesby Hall" (named after a famous hunting seat in Leicestershire, the pre-eminent fox-hunting county.) It described a revival of emotion in a jaded and spend-thrift city MP as he recalls the excitement of his youth foxhunting in Leicestershire, and foresees the end of his Victorian aristocratic society:

Can I but regain my credit can I spend spent cash again
Hide me from my deep emotion O thou wonderful champagne
Make me feel the wild pulsation I have often felt before
When my horse went on before me and my hack was at the door

later:

Saw the landlords yield their acres after centuries of wrongs
To the Cotton Lords to whom it's proved all property belongs
Queen Religion State abandoned and all flags of party furled
In the government of Cobden and the dotage of the world.

"Locksley Hall" inspired many prominent 19th-century poets to parody, including Ambrose Bierce in "Weather":

Once I dipt into the future far as human eye could see,
And I saw the Chief Forecaster, dead as any one can be.
Dead and damned and shut in Hades as a liar from his birth,
With a record of unreason seldom paralleled on earth.

In a scene from the American film Marathon Man, graduate student Thomas "Babe" Levy (portrayed by actor Dustin Hoffman) attends an exclusive seminar at Columbia University. During the seminar, the cantankerous Professor Biesenthal, played by Fritz Weaver, quotes the line "Let us hush this cry of 'Forward' till ten thousand years have gone" from "Locksley Hall Sixty Years After" and then asks if anyone recognises it. Hoffman's character is the only one who does (he writes down the title in his notes) but does not reveal this to the class. Biesenthal scolds his students, remarking "How do you expect to compete on a doctoral level if haven't read Locksley Hall..." After impatiently dismissing the other students, Biesenthal calls him out, asking "Levy, why didn't you answer that Tennyson question? It was obvious you knew the answer."

In the television programme Star Trek: Voyager, the dedication plaque of the USS. Voyager quotes from the poem: "For I dipt into the future, far as human eye could see; Saw the vision of the world, and all the wonder that would be."

Track two of the album Exit by electronic music ensemble Tangerine Dream is called "Pilots of Purple Twilight" in homage --- as discussed in the Wikipedia entry on the band, British poetry was an extramusical source of inspiration, particularly to band leader Edgar Froese.

"Locksley Hall" is also the source of the title of Colum McCann's 2009 novel Let the Great World Spin.

Also, it includes one of the most famous lines in all of English poetry, the last of the following four, albeit very few are aware of the poem whence it came, and it is often, perhaps usually, misquoted:

In the spring a fuller crimson comes upon the robin's breast
In the spring the wanton lapwing gets himself another crest
In the spring a livelier iris changes on the burnished dove
In the spring a young man's fancy lightly turns to thoughts of love.

James Thurber illustrated this poem for Fables for Our Time and Famous Poems Illustrated.
