= Gerald S. Graham =

Canadian historian (1903–1988)

- Born: 27 April 1903; Sudbury, Ontario, Canada
- Died: 5 July 1988 (aged 85); St Leonards-on-Sea, East Sussex, England

Gerald Sandford Graham (born 27 April 1903 in Sudbury, Ontario – died 5 July 1988 St Leonards-on-Sea, East Sussex) was Rhodes Professor of Imperial History at King's College London from 1949 until his retirement in 1970. He earned a world reputation for his series of in-depth studies of the interrelationship between sea power and the development of the British empire.

In 1929, Graham married Winifred Emily Ware (1907–1990), with whom he had a son. They divorced in 1950 and he married Constance Mary Greey, with whom he had two daughters and a son.

== Education ==
- Queen's University, B.A., 1924, M.A., 1925
- Harvard University, A.M., 1929
- Cambridge University, PhD, 1929

== Academic, military, and naval career ==
On his return from Germany in 1930, Graham was appointed instructor and tutor in history at Harvard University, where he remained until 1936, when he received an appointment as assistant professor of history at Queen's University. There, he was quickly promoted to associate professor, and then full professor.

For 1940–41, he was awarded a Guggenheim Fellowship that resulted in Graham's first major book that showed his shift of research interests to British naval history: Sea Power and British North America, 1783- 1820. Toward the end of 1941, he joined the Canadian Army, but quickly shifted to the Royal Canadian Naval Volunteer Reserve and was appointed an instructor lieutenant commander to teach entering officers at Royal Roads Military College. While teaching there, Graham was able to get first-hand experience of the war at sea, by spending time during academic breaks on board Canadian destroyers in the Atlantic and in torpedo boats at Dover. Following the allied landings in northern France in 1944, Graham was returned to the Canadian Army as a major, and served with the historical section of the Canadian Army Overseas in London.

Graham's military assignment to London was the event that led him to stay in Britain for the remainder of his career. After demobilisation, he was appointed lecturer in history at Birkbeck College, London, and in 1949 was elected to succeed Professor Vincent Harlow as Rhodes Professor of Imperial History at King's College London.

Gerald Graham served as Rhodes Professor for 29-years until his retirement at the age of 67 in 1970, when he was appointed professor emeritus. While in that academic post, Graham specialised in teaching the history of the British Empire in the period 1880–1932 and in British colonial history. He travelled and lectured widely through the Commonwealth.

In addition to his teaching, he worked closely with the Royal Commonwealth Society, to which he had initially been elected in 1928, later becoming a Life Fellow and Vice-President. He was a member of its Library Committee from 1948 to 1955, its Imperial Studies Committee in 1952–57, and chairman of its Academic Committee, which awarded the Walter Frewen Lord Prize for the best postgraduate essay in imperial history. In addition, revived the Society's monograph series, Imperial Studies, and he edited volumes XXII (1961) through XXIX (1970) of the series. Similarly in working with the Oxford University Press, Graham served as general editor of its West African History series, most of which became the standard works on this field.

In 1963–64, Queen's University, Belfast honoured Graham by inviting him to deliver the Wiles Lectures, which were published the next year by Cambridge University Press as The Politics of Naval Supremacy. In 1967, Graham delivered the Reid Lectures at Acadia University, which were published as Tides of Empire: Discursions on the Expansion of Britain Overseas.

Immediately after Graham's retirement in London, he returned to Canada for two years as to serve as visiting professor of military and strategic studies at the University of Western Ontario in 1970–1972. After this appointment, Graham returned to his permanent home in England at St Leonards-on-Sea, where he died at the age of 85 in 1988.

== Published works ==
A complete bibliography of Graham's historical writings for the years 1930 to 1972 was compiled by George Metcalf and published in Graham's festschrift: Flint and Williams, eds., Perspectives of Empire (1973). The list included the following books:

- British Policy and Canada: a study in 18th century trade policy (1930)
- Sea power and British North America, 1783–1820: a study in British colonial policy (1941)
- Britain and Canada (1943)
- Canada: a short history (1950)
- Empire of the North Atlantic : the maritime struggle for North America (1950, 1958)
- The Walker Expedition to Quebec, 1711, Publications of the Navy Records Society and of the Champlain Society, (1953)
- The Navy and South America, 1807–1823 : correspondence of the commanders-in-chief on the South American station, Navy Records Society (1962)
- The politics of naval supremacy : studies in British maritime ascendancy (1965)
- Great Britain in the Indian Ocean: a study of maritime enterprise 1810–1850 (1967)
- The secular abyss: an interpretation of history by Gerald S. Graham and John Alexander (1967)
- A concise history of Canada (1968)
- A concise history of the British Empire (1970)
- Tides of empire: discursions on the expansion of Britain overseas (1972)
- The Royal Navy in the War of American Independence (1976)
- The China station: war and diplomacy 1830–1860 (1978)

== Sources ==
- K.O. Dike, 'Gerald S. Graham: teacher and historian', in J.E. Flint and Glyndwyr Williams, eds., Perspectives of Empire: Essays presented to Gerald S. Graham (1973), pp. 1–8.
- John Flint, 'Graham, Gerald Sandford (1903–1988)' in Oxford Dictionary of National Biography (2006).
