= N. E. Cameron =

N. E. Cameron (26 January 1903 – May 1983) was a writer from Guyana who wrote on almost every topic from history and mathematics to politics.

== Biography ==
=== Early years and education ===
Norman Eustace Cameron was born in New Amsterdam, Guyana. He attended Queen's College in Georgetown, and in 1921 won the Guyana Scholarship, achieving First-Class Honours at the Oxford and Cambridge Higher Examination, with five distinctions in Latin, French, English, Mathematics and Religious Knowledge, placing him first among candidates from Barbados and Guyana.

At the University of Cambridge, he continued to excel in Mathematics. taking first-class honours in Part 1 of the Mathematical Tripos in 1923, and graduating Senior Optime in 1925.

=== Academic career ===
On returning to Guyana he founded his own school, The Guyanese Academy (1926–34), and wrote The Evolution of the Negro, published in two volumes (1929 and 1934), which Kenneth Ramchand has called "A rare and neglected but very useful work".

In 1934 Cameron returned as a Senior Master to his alma mater, Queen's College, to teach mathematics, and to contribute to the development of his school. While teaching at Queen's College, he wrote several dramatic works, published an anthology of Guyanese poetry, wrote numerous essays, memoranda and articles on the culture and politics of Guyanese life, and authored four high-school text books on mathematics (1942), as well as the history of Queen's College (1951). He was appointed Deputy Principal in 1958. In 1968 he became Professor Emeritus, occupying the Chair of Mathematics at the University of Guyana.

== Honours ==
He was awarded the M.B.E. in 1962, Guyana's Golden Arrow of Achievement (A.A.) in 1972, and the Sir Alfred Victor Crane Gold Medal for his contribution to education in Guyana in 1976.

== Posthumous accolades ==
Cameron died in May 1983. His life was documented in Joycelynne Loncke's The Man and his Works. In 2009, to honour his memory and his school, the Queen's College of Guyana Alumni Association (Toronto) re-published his A History of the Queen's College of British Guiana, adding a biographical sketch by Loncke, and extending it beyond 1951 with the Reminiscences (1945–1980) of C. I. Trotz, an outstanding alumnus, master and principal of the school, and other pieces from the six Queen's College alumni associations around the world.
