= Andrekos Varnava =

Writer and Cypriot history academic

Andrekos Varnava FRHistS, FRSA,
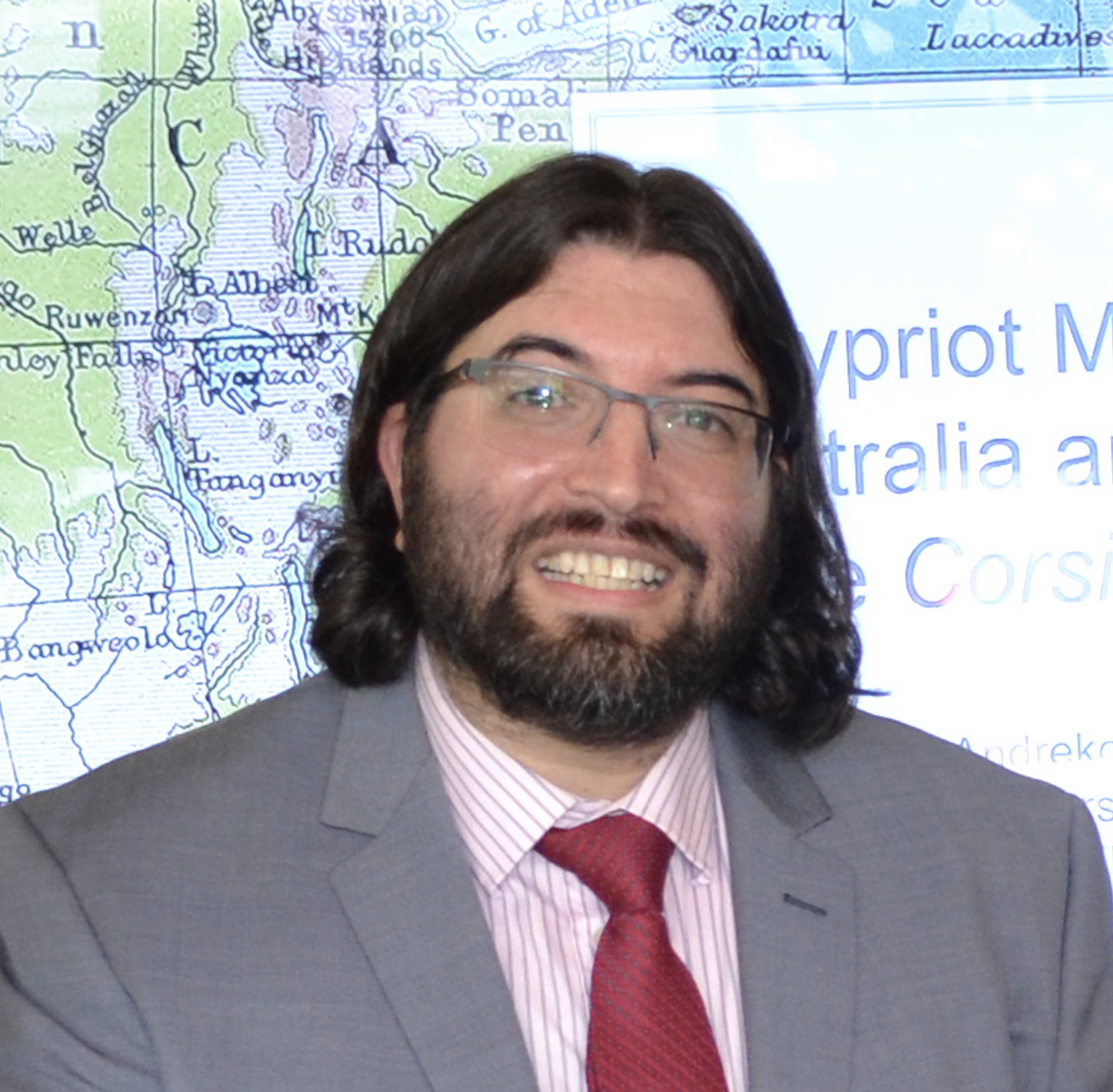
- Varnava in 2022
- Born: Melbourne, Victoria, Australia
- Education: Monash University; University of Melbourne (PhD)
- Occupations: Writer and professor in British colonial history
- Employer: Flinders University
- Spouse: Helen Komodromou

Andrekos Varnava (born 1979), is a Cypriot–Australian writer and historian, who is best known for his work confronting controversial moments in modern history and their consequences.

== Life and works ==
Varnava was born in Melbourne to parents of Greek Cypriot descent, specifically his father from Frenaros and his mother from Agios Ilias, both from the Famagusta District. He attended schools at South Oakleigh, where he became fascinated by the history of World War 1 and 2. History prompted him to identify more with his Cypriot heritage, challenging what it meant to be Cypriot as distinct from being identified as either Greek or Turkish. Varnava went on to read History, modern Greek and English Literature at Monash University, completing his Honours degree in 2001 and moving on to University of Melbourne, where he completed his PhD (in history) in 2006.

Varnava had visited Cyprus briefly a number of times, but in 2006 he took up a position as assistant professor in history at the European University Cyprus, a position he held for two years. During this period, he married his wife and acquired dual nationality.

In 2009, Varnava returned to Australia when he accepted a history lecturer position at Flinders University. He has written books and lectured on British, European, and imperial history—with special attention paid to both British and Ottoman empires, and their influence on the Middle East. This was his main interest since the interaction of these two empires shaped the modern history of Cyprus. The nationalism during the late nineteenth century, the First World War and the consequent post-World War II terrorism and civil war during the Republic period contributed to the changes and progress of the modern Cyprus.

Varnava set about publishing his work, writing over 70 papers (articles and book chapters), 4 monographs, and 16 edited collections. His main academic focus has been on the history of the British Empire, particularly its impact on Cyprus, unpicking the socio-economic effect of such themes as martial races theory and venereal disease, and socio-political themes such as extreme nationalism and chauvinism. His prolific writing mirrored his academic career at Flinders, where he was promoted senior lecturer in 2012, was invited by Selim Deringil and Vangelis Kechriotis to be a visiting professor at Boğaziçi University in Istanbul in 2012, elected as a Fellow of Royal Historical Society in 2014, promoted to associate professor in 2016, made an Honorary professor at De Montfort University in 2018, and promoted to full professor in 2022. Varnava has co-authored works with such eminent scholars as Panikos Panayi and Philip Payton, and published in his edited works the work of pre-eminent scholars such as John M. MacKenzie, Eric S. Richards, Joy Damousi, Robert I. Rotberg, Sia Anagnostopoulou, and Ayhan Aktar.

In 2025 he became the editor-in-chief of The Journal of Imperial and Commonwealth History.

He was elected a Fellow of the Australian Academy of the Humanities in 2025.

=== Contentious issues ===
As a PhD candidate at the University of Melbourne in 2003, Varnava appealed to Greek and Turkish Cypriots to set aside their ethnic differences and to reunite their country by accepting that they were both perpetrators and victims of past violence. While in Cyprus, Varnava had become increasingly aware of the cultural isolation of minority groups, which inspired him to organise a conference in 2007, focusing on challenges faced by minorities preserving their identity in a nationalistic state. (Note: Cypriot minorities had been forced by nationalists to identify as either Greek or Turkish Cypriot in the aftermath of the schism following independence in 1960; the same nationalism that had been responsible for the diasporas of minorities post WWI in the first place. This view was not universally welcome.) In 2009, Varnava asserted that British imperialism in Cyprus was critically flawed, unable to achieve its full purpose in making Cyprus a strategic stronghold for the Empire, creating instead the conditions for more nationalistic sentiments to take hold among the Greek Cypriot population. He followed this with research that blamed British humanitarianism for being selective and restricted by imperialism, particularly in relation to the formation of the French Armenian Legion and Musa Dagh refugees.

In 2014 and 2018, Varnava co-organised two conferences on WWI at Nanyang Technological University in Singapore with Professor Michael J.K. Walsh, and in his contributions he challenged popular narratives around Greek nationalism and Enosis, which had suppressed the role of Greek and Turkish Cypriots working together in the First World War along with implications of loyalty towards the British. In 2024 Varnava gave a speech at the unveiling of a plaque in the garden beside the Famagusta Gate, in Nicosia, organised by Αchilleas Demetriades, in memory of the Cypriots who served in the Cypriot Mule Corps during the First World War.

First in 2016 and in a more substantial article in 2025, Varnava openly addressed the systematic killing of Christian Ottoman Greek population of Anatolia in the Greco-Turkish War, which he argued was part of a programme of ethnic cleansing stopping short of actual genocide. He is equally outspoken about Armenian genocide in the Ottoman Empire/Turkey in 1915 and 1916, praising Göçek for calling it out, but criticising her for not making the distinction between genocide, in the case of the Armenians in 1915 and 1916, and ethnic cleansing, which he argues is a more suitable term for what happened after the war during the Franco-Turkish War.

In 2018, after publishing a seminal article in English Historical Review with Evan Smith on the Cypriots in London during the inter-war years as a 'suspect community', Varnava won as lead chief investigator an Australian Research Council grant to head a team investigating border controls between Britain and Australia in the 20th Century. This was to examine "suspect migrant communities", and how past historical policies compare with contemporary practices, citing British and Australian political, and sometimes racial, influences.

His book published in 2021 (translated into Greek in 2024) describes the assassination of a leading Cypriot politician Antonios Triantafyllides in 1934, attributing his murder to far-right-wing nationalist extremists he connects to the post-war formation of EOKA. (Note: Triantafyllides' grand-daughter, Stella Kyriakides, is a politician in Cyprus and European Commissioner for Health and Food Safety)

== Selected publications ==
=== Books and monographs ===
- British Imperialism and Cyprus 1878-1915: The Inconsequential Possession (Manchester University Press, 2009)

British imperialism in Cyprus, 1878–1915 – The inconsequential possession (Manchester University Press, 2012)

- Serving the empire in the Great War – The Cypriot Mule Corps, imperial loyalty and silenced memory (Manchester University Press, 2017)
- British Cyprus and the Long Great War, 1914–1925 (Routledge, 2020)
- Assassination in Colonial Cyprus in 1934 and the Origins of EOKA (Anthem Press, 2021)

=== Edited or co-edited volumes ===
- Reunifying Cyprus: The Annan Plan and Beyond (I. B. Tauris, London, February 2009, paperback 2011),
- The Minorities of Cyprus: Development Patterns and the Identity of the Internal-Exclusion (Cambridge Scholars Publishing, Newcastle upon Tyne, April 2009)
- The Archbishops of Cyprus in the Modern Age: The Changing Role of the Archbishop-Ethnarch, their Identities and Politics (Cambridge Scholars Publishing, Newcastle upon Tyne, September 2013)
- Imperial Expectations and Realities: El Dorados, Utopias and Dystopias (Manchester University Press, 2015)
- Australia and the Great War: Identity, Memory and Mythology (Melbourne University Press, Melbourne, 2016)
- The Great War and the British Empire: Culture and Society (Routledge Studies in First World War History, 2017)
- Australia, Migration and Empire – Immigrants in a Globalised World (Palgrave Macmillan, London 2019)
- Comic empires- Imperialism in cartoons, caricature, and satirical art (Manchester University Press, 2019)
- After the Armistice – Empire, Endgame and Aftermath (Routledge, 2021)
- Exiting war – The British Empire and the 1918–20 moment (Manchester University Press, 2022)
- New Perspectives on the Greek War of Independence: Myths, Realities, Legacies and Reflections (Palgrave Macmillan/Springer, November 2022)
- Popular Culture and its Relationship to Conflict in the UK and Australia since the Great War (Routledge, 2023)
- Forced Migration: Exiles and Refugees in the UK and the British Empire, 1815-1949 (Brill Studies in Global Migration History Series, 2025)
