= Wm. Roger Louis =

American historian (1936–2026)

William Roger Louis CBE FBA (May 8, 1936 – October 23, 2026), commonly known as Wm. Roger Louis or, informally, Roger Louis, was an American historian and academic who was a professor at the University of Texas at Austin. During his career, Louis was the editor-in-chief of The Oxford History of the British Empire, a president of the American Historical Association (AHA), a chairman of the U.S. Department of State's Historical Advisory Committee, and a founding director of the AHA's National History Center in Washington, D.C.

== Early life ==
William Roger Louis was born in Detroit, Michigan, on May 8, 1936. His family was from Oklahoma, and he was raised in Oklahoma City. He attended Northwest Classen High School and was the assistant first horn player in the Oklahoma City Philharmonic.

His parents, Henry Edward Louis and Bena May Flood, were "solidly middle class people who set a strong example of the importance of work, thrift, and family". Louis admitted that he was "less religious", but he described his philosophy in life with the one-liner made famous by Franklin Roosevelt: "I am a Christian and a Democrat. What more does one need in life?"

Louis was involved in gymnastics and handball at the local YMCA, which was his first experience with segregation in Oklahoma. He traced his civil rights commitment to that experience.

== Education ==
Louis earned his Bachelor of Arts at the University of Oklahoma. his Master of Arts at Harvard University, and his Doctor of Philosophy at Oxford University.

He entered the University of Oklahoma in 1954 as a Letters major, an honors curriculum that included one ancient and two modern languages, English, history, and philosophy. He spent his second year of college in Freiburg and Paris, where he roomed with Hans-Peter Schwartz, a biographer of Konrad Adenauer, and befriended Nancy Maginnes, the future wife of Henry Kissinger. His time abroad kindled an interest in African and Middle Eastern nationalism. He spent the summer of 1956 in Egypt and was in Cairo when Gamel Abdel Nasser announced Egypt's nationalization of the Suez Canal. Louis spent his last two years of college at Oklahoma, where he graduated Phi Beta Kappa.

With the help of the University of Oklahoma's Philip Nolan, Louis applied for a Woodrow Wilson Fellowship. He was admitted to Harvard in 1959. The "best of [his] Harvard education" were the classes with Rupert Emerson, who taught nationalism in colonial Africa and Barrington Moore, Jr., who provided an introduction to Karl Marx and Marxist analysis. That was "an approach so radically different from all others that it was a revelation," Louis later wrote. Louis benefited from Ernest R. May, whom he regarded as having "one of the most fertile and inventive minds of all historians I have known."

After one year at Harvard, Louis transferred to St. Antony's College at the University of Oxford. Australian economist Arthur Smithies told Louis, "If you are really interested in studying Nasser and Africa and all that rot, then you had better go somewhere where they know something about it, which definitely is not Harvard." Smithies helped Louis get a Marshall Scholarship to Oxford, where he began his studies in 1960. Louis studied under the historians Margery Perham, John Andrew Gallagher, and A. J. P. Taylor. Louis said that Taylor was "not only the towering radical historian of our time, but also one of the great writers of the English language."

== Academic career ==
After completing his education, Louis taught courses for eight years at Yale University on comparative imperialism, where there already existed a strong tradition of research on German colonialism. Ronald Robinson wrote, "At conference after conference, the circle of Louis's consultants widened with the number of contributors. He made his first major contribution to Imperial history as the grand impresario of symposia."

In 1970, Louis joined the history faculty of the University of Texas at Austin and became the director of the British Studies Seminar at the Harry Ransom Humanities Research Center. He directed British Studies since 1975, held the Kerr Chair in English History and Culture since 1985, and served as the chairman of the British Scholar Editorial Advisory Board since 2006. Louis was named in February 2009 the "University of Texas Professor of the Year" in recognition of his "unwavering dedication and service" to the students of the university.

Louis was a proponent of area studies, a field that has risen to prominence.

== Scholarship, writing, and editing ==
Louis was best known for his work on the British Empire and focuses mostly on British imperial policies and decolonization in Asia, Africa, and the Middle East after World War II.

=== Author ===
Louis wrote a large number of books and articles about the British Empire from 1940 to 1967, particularly concerning the Middle East, the Cold War, and the rise of American imperialism in the region. His first major book, Imperialism at Bay, 1941–1945 (1977), covers the contest between British and American officials over the fate of Britain's empire in the postwar world. His second and most famous book, The British Empire in the Middle East, 1945–1951 (1984), traces the critical years of Clement Attlee's Labour cabinet when the British government maintained their informal influence in the Middle East with the backing of the United States, which saw the British Empire as a bulwark against the spread of communism.

=== Editor ===
While teaching at Yale University, Louis began his career-long practice of collaboratively editing books. Among them was, with Prosser Gifford, a series on British and German colonialism in Africa. Another was A. J. P. Taylor's The Origins of the Second World War.

Later, Louis and Robert Stookey edited a book covering the creation of the state of Israel. Another, with James Bill, revisited the nationalization of the Iranian oil industry in 1951, in response to a movement led by Mohammad Mosaddegh. Yet another, with Robert Fernea, studied the Iraqi revolution of 1958.

One of his most enduring edited volumes was The Robinson and Gallagher Controversy (1976), a short volume that brought together the main lines of debate over the contributions of John Andrew Gallagher and Ronald Robinson to the history of the British Empire. Their scholarly oeuvre remains one of the most important theories about the causes and nature of British imperial expansion.

Louis's greatest achievement may be what Robinson described as "a symposia to end all symposia." Louis was the editor-in-chief of The Oxford History of the British Empire, which was funded by the Rhodes Trust and the National Endowment for the Humanities. Published initially in five volumes, it brought together more than 120 historians to cover four centuries of Britain's overseas empire. Multiple reviewers in top academic journals lauded the series as one of the great achievements of the age. One reviewer, the historian Anthony Low, wrote, "All in all, these five volumes constitute an extraordinary achievement which has brought Roger Louis's dauntingly formidable editorial skills to their apogee... He has brought the whole enterprise to a conclusion all in one go and in an astonishingly short period of time. Those of us who have organized similar (if very much more modest) ventures can only mop our brows in amazement." The British historian Max Beloff initially and publicly expressed skepticism about a "politically correct" Texan being the editor-in-chief. He later withdrew those criticisms when it became evident in Beloff's mind that Louis had carried through the series with impartiality. Louis was the co-editor of the twentieth century volume (with Judith M. Brown) and the author of the "Historiography" introduction to the fifth volume.

== Death ==
Louis died in Austin, Texas, on October 23, 2026, at the age of 90.

== Honors and accolades ==
Louis won the 1984 George Louis Beer Prize for The British Empire in the Middle East.

In 1993, Louis was elected a fellow of the British Academy. The Queen made him a Commander of the Order of the British Empire in 1999 in recognition of his professional achievements.

In 2009, Louis was appointed to a Kluge Chair at the Library of Congress for the 2010 spring semester.

In 2011, Louis was elected a fellow of the American Academy of Arts and Sciences, an independent policy research center founded in 1780 whose early members included George Washington, Thomas Jefferson, Benjamin Franklin, and Alexander Hamilton, plus its founders John Adams, John Hancock, and James Bowdoin.

His early achievements as an historian were commemorated by Ronald Robinson in the Journal of Imperial and Commonwealth History in a 1999 article entitled "Wm. Roger Louis and the Official Mind of Decolonization."

Louis has been acclaimed by A. J. P. Taylor as his generation's foremost historian of the empire. Alan Bullock has said that Louis is the leading historian of the final phase of the empire. Robinson, one of the most influential of all imperial historians, has written, "Louis takes his place among a handful of writers from Hancock to Harlow to Cain and Hopkins who have given us an original view of a major movement in British imperial history."

== Influences ==
During his time as president of the American Historical Association, Louis wrote an essay entitled "Historians I Have Known", which discusses the historians who had the most profound impact on his scholarship. Louis included a handful of Oxford historians, each of whom were among the most prominent and influential scholars of their generation: A. J. P. Taylor, Margery Perham, Ronald Robinson, John Andrew Gallagher, and Max Beloff. Other influences included Barrington Moore, Jr., Ernest R. May, and Arthur Smithies - all of Harvard - and Vincent Harlow, Roger Owen, Christopher Platt, Sarvepalli Gopal, and Albert Hourani, all of Oxford.

Louis's scholarship was also influenced by J. C. Hurewitz, a prominent scholar of Israel and Palestine. In the preface to his book The British Empire in the Middle East, 1945–1951, Louis stated, "My views on Arab nationalism and Zionism, and on the United States and the Middle East, have been influenced by the sensitive and dead-on-the-mark observations of J. C. Hurewitz.”

== Publications ==
=== Books ===
- Ruanda-Urundi, 1884–1919 (1963)
- Great Britain and Germany's Lost Colonies, 1914–1919 (1967)
- (ed., with Prosser Gifford) Britain and Germany in Africa: Imperial Rivalry and Colonial Rule (1967)
- E.D. Morel's History of the Congo Reform Movement (1968)
- British Strategy in the Far East, 1919–1939 (1971)
- (ed., with Prosser Gifford) France and Britain in Africa: Imperial Rivalry and Colonial Rule (1971)
- (ed.) National Security and International Trusteeship in the Pacific (1972)
- (ed.) The Origins of the Second World War: A. J. P. Taylor and His Critics (1972)
- (ed.) Imperialism: The Robinson and Gallagher Controversy (1976)
- Imperialism at Bay: The United States and the Decolonization of the British Empire, 1941-1945 (1977)
- (ed., with William S. Livingston) Australia, New Zealand, and the Pacific Islands since the First World War (1979)
- (ed., with Prosser Gifford) The Transfer of Power in Africa: Decolonization, 1940–1960 (1982)
- The British Empire in the Middle East, 1945–1951 (1984)
- (ed., with Hedley Bull) The 'Special Relationship': Anglo-American Relations since 1945 (1986)
- (ed., with Robert W. Stookey) The End of the Palestine Mandate (1986)
- (ed., with Prosser Gifford) Decolonization and African Independence: The Transfers of Power, 1960–1980 (1988)
- (ed., with James A. Bill) Musaddiq, Iranian Nationalism, and Oil (1988)
- (ed., with Roger Owen) Suez 1956: The Crisis and Its Consequences (1989)
- (ed., with Robert A. Fernea) The Iraqi Revolution of 1958: The Old Social Classes Revisited (1991)
- In the Name of God, Go!: Leo Amery and the British Empire in the Age of Churchill (1992)
- (ed., with Robert Blake) Churchill (1993)
- (ed.) Adventures with Britannia (1995)
- (ed., with Michael Howard) The Oxford History of the Twentieth Century (1998)
- (ed.) More Adventures with Britannia (1998)
- (Editor-in-Chief) The Oxford History of the British Empire (5 vols. 1998–1999)
- (ed., with Ronald Hyam) British Documents on the End of Empire: The Conservative Government and the End of Empire, 1957–1964 (2 parts, 2000)
- (ed., with Roger Owen) A Revolutionary Year: The Middle East in 1958 (2002)
- (ed.) Still More Adventures with Britannia (2003)
- (ed., with S.R. Ashton) British Documents on the End of Empire: East of Suez and the Commonwealth, 1964–1971 (3 parts, 2004)
- (General Editor) Reinterpreting History: How Historical Assessments Change over Time (AHA National History Center and Oxford University Press series, 2004-)
- (ed.) Yet More Adventures with Britannia (2005)
- (ed.) Burnt Orange Britannia (2006)
- Ends of British Imperialism: The Scramble for Empire, Suez and Decolonization: Collected Essays (2006)
- (ed.) Penultimate Adventures with Britannia (2007)
- (ed.) Ultimate Adventures with Britannia (2009)
- (ed.) Resurgent Adventures with Britannia (2011)
- (ed., with Avi Shlaim) The 1967 Arab-Israeli War: Origins and Consequences (2012)
- (ed.) The History of Oxford University Press, Volume III: 1896–1970 (2013)
- (ed.) Irrepressible Adventures with Britannia (2013)
- (ed.) Resplendent Adventures with Britannia (2015)
- (ed.) Effervescent Adventures with Britannia (2017)
- (ed.) Serendipitous Adventures with Britannia (2019)
- The End of the British Empire in the Middle East, 1952—1971 (2025)

=== Articles and book chapters ===
Please note that a number of the following titles refer to recently revised versions of these articles as published in Louis's volume of collected essays: Ends of British Imperialism

- "The United States and the African Peace Settlement of 1919: The Pilgrimage of George Louis Beer" (Journal of African History, 1963)
- "Roger Casement and the Congo" (Journal of African History, 1964)
- "E. D. Morel and the Triumph of the Congo Reform Association" (Boston University Papers on Africa, 1966)
- "Australia and the German Colonies in the Pacific During the First World War," Journal of Modern History Vol. 38, No. 4, December 1966
- "The Repartition of Africa During the First World War" (American Historical Review, 1966)
- "The Scramble for Africa: Sir Percy Anderson's Grand Strategy" (English Historical Review, 1966)
- "The Beginning of the Mandates System of the League of Nations" (International Organization, 1969)
- "The Berlin Congo Conference and the (Non-) Partition of Africa, 1884–1885" (France and Britain in Africa, 1971)
- "Robinson and Gallagher and Their Critics" (The Robinson and Gallagher Controversy, 1976)
- "The Road to the Fall of Singapore, 1942: British Imperialism in East Asia in the 1930s" (The Fascist Challenge and the Policy of Appeasement, 1983)
- "American Anti-Colonialism, Suez, and the Special Relationship" (International Affairs, 1985)
- "The Partitions of India and Palestine" (Warfare, Diplomacy, and Politics: Essays in Honour of A. J. P. Taylor, 1986)
- "The End of the Palestine Mandate" (The End of the Palestine Mandate, 1986)
- "A Prime Donna with Honour: Eden and Suez" (Times Literary Supplement, 31 October 1986)
- "Taking the Plunge Into Indian Independence" (Times Literary Supplement, 28 August 1987)
- "Libya: The Creation of a Client State" (Decolonization and African Independence: The Transfers of Power, 1960–1980, 1988)
- "The Governing Intellect: L. S. Amery, the British Empire, and Indian Independence" (Times Literary Supplement, 26 August 1988)
- "Taxing Transfers of Power in Africa" (Times Literary Supplement, 10 February 1989)
- "An American Volcano in the Middle East: John Foster Dulles and the Suez Crisis" (John Foster Dulles and the Diplomacy of the Cold War, 1990)
- "The Origins of the Iraqi Revolution" (The Iraqi Revolution of 1958, 1991)
- "The Coming of Independence in the Sudan" (Margery Perham and British Rule in Africa, 1991)
- "Prelude to Suez: Churchill and Egypt" (Churchill: A Major New Assessment of His Life in Peace and War, 1993)
- (with Ronald Robinson) "The Imperialism of Decolonization" (Journal of Imperial and Commonwealth History, 1994)
- "Hong Kong: The Critical Phase, 1945–1949" (American Historical Review, 1997)
- "The Colonial Empires in the Late Nineteenth and Early Twentieth Centuries" (Oxford History of the Twentieth Century, 1998)
- "The Historiography of the British Empire" (Oxford History of the British Empire, Vol. 5, 1999)
- "The Middle East Crisis of 1958" (A Revolutionary Year: The Middle East in 1958, 2002)
- "The Dissolution of the British Empire in the Era of Vietnam" (American Historical Review, 2002)
- "The Withdrawal from the Gulf" (Journal of Imperial and Commonwealth History, 2003)
- "Musaddiq, Oil, and the Dilemmas of British Imperialism" (Ends of British Imperialism, 2006. Updated from earlier essay in Mohammad Mosaddeq and the 1953 Coup in Iran, 2004)
- "The Pax Americana: Sir Keith Hancock, the British Empire, and American Expansion" (English Historical Review, 2005)
- "Suez and Decolonization: Scrambling out of Africa and Asia" (Ends of British Imperialism, 2006)
- "The British and the French Colonial Empire: Trusteeship and Self-Interest" (Ends of British Imperialism, 2006)
- "The United Nations and the Suez Crisis: British Ambivalence Towards the Pope on the East River (Ends of British Imperialism, 2006)
- "Public Enemy Number One: Britain and the United Nations in the Aftermath of Suez" (The British Empire in the 1950s: Retreat or Revival?, 2006)
- "Introduction: The Evolution of the Press over a Critical Three-Quarters of a Century, from the 1890s to the 1970s" (The History of Oxford University Press, Volume III: 1896–1970, 2013)
- "Reassessing the History of Oxford University Press, 1896–1970" (The History of Oxford University Press, Volume III: 1896–1970, 2013)
- "The Waldock Inquiry, 1967–1970" (The History of Oxford University Press, Volume III: 1896–1970, 2013)
