= Madhavi Kale =

American historian

Madhavi Kale is professor of history of Bryn Mawr College and associate professor at the University of Toronto Scarborough. Kale received her BA from Yale University and her PhD from the University of Pennsylvania.

Kale is a specialist in British and imperial history, and has published numerous works on the Indian indenture system. In a 2002 review of The Oxford History of the British Empire in Social History, she criticized the series as "a disturbingly revisionist project that seeks to neutralize ... the massive political and military brutality and repression" of the empire.

== Selected publications ==
- "The Negro and Dark Princess: Two Legacies of the Universal Races Congress (London, 1911)" in Radical History Review, 92 (spring): pp. 133–152. (With Robert Gregg)
- "Projecting Identities: Empire and 19th-Century Indentured Labor Migration from India to Trinidad and British Guiana," in Peter van der Veer, ed., Nation and Migration. Philadelphia: University of Pennsylvania Press, 1994.
- "Capital Spectacles in British Frames: Capital, Empire and Indian Indentured Migration to the British Caribbean" in International Review of Social History, 41:109-33, 1996.
- "When the 'Saints' came marching in: British abolitionists and Indian indentured migration" in Rick B. Halpern and Martin Daunton, eds., Empire and Others: British Encounters with Indigenous Peoples, 1600-1850. Philadelphia: University of Pennsylvania Press, 1999. ISBN 9780812216998
- Fragments of Empire: Capital, Slavery, and Indian indentured Labor Migration in the British Caribbean. Philadelphia: University of Pennsylvania Press, 1998. ISBN 0812234677
