= M. Jamal Deen =

Mohamed Jamal Deen CM is an Indo-Guyanese professor and Senior Canada Research Chair in Information Technology at McMaster University in Hamilton, Ontario, Canada. He is also the Director of the Micro- and Nano-Systems Laboratory. His research specialty are in the broad areas of electrical engineering and applied physics, for which he was recognized in 2019 by an appointment to the Order of Canada.

== Education ==
Deen completed a B.Sc. degree in Mathematics and Physics at the University of Guyana in 1978, winning both the Chancellor's Medal as well as the Dr. Irving Adler's Prize for being the best mathematics student. After working for two years at the University of Guyana, he won the prestigious Fulbright scholarship (under the Latin American program) to undertake graduate work at Case Western Reserve University. Later as a doctoral student, he won an American Vacuum Society Scholarship. He completed his doctoral dissertation on the design and modeling of a new CARS (coherent anti-Stokes scattering) spectroscopy system for dynamic temperature measurements and combustion optimization in rocket and jet engines, in 1985.

== Research and publication ==
Deen has published extensively on microelectronics/nanoelectronics and optoelectronics including works on the noise in electronic devices. As stated by McMaster University on "Faces of Innovation", Jamal Deen is generally regarded as "A leading expert in modeling, design and applications of modern advanced semiconductor devices and circuits". He has co-edited two research monographs Low Temperature Electronics: Physics, Devices, Circuits, and Applications and CMOS RF Modeling, Characterization and Applications

== Honours ==
Deen has been honoured many times by his peers through his election to the highest status in professional societies and national academies. In 2019 he was appointed to the Order of Canada in recognition of his contributions to the fields of electrical engineering and applied physics. The following year he was elected to the Chinese Academy of Sciences.

- Fellow of the Royal Society of Canada.
- Fellow of the Canadian Academy of Engineering in 2007.
- Fellow of the Indian National Academy of Engineering.
- Fellow of the Institute of Electrical and Electronics Engineers.
- Fellow of the Engineering Institute of Canada.
- Fellow of the Electrochemical Society.
- Fellow of the American Association for the Advancement of Science.
- Honorary Member of the World Innovation Foundation, the foundation's highest honor.
- Fellow of the American Physical Society.
