= Faisal Devji =

Historian and academic (born 1964)

Professor Faisal Devji FRHistS
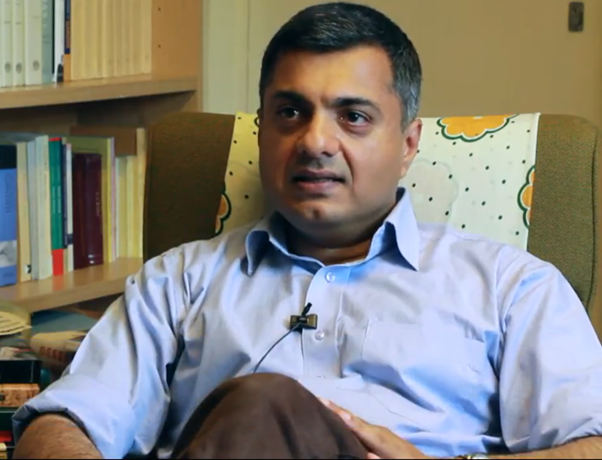
- Devji in 2013
- Born: 1964 (age 61–62); Dar es Salaam, Tanzania
- Occupations: Historian and academic
- Title: Beit Professor of Global and Imperial History

Academic background
- Education: University of British Columbia; University of Chicago
- Thesis: Muslim Nationalism: Founding Identity in Colonial India
- Doctoral advisor: Fazlur Rahman Malik

Academic work
- Discipline: History
- Sub-discipline: History of India; History of Islam; Global history; History of violence
- Institutions: Harvard University; Institute of Ismaili Studies; University of Chicago; The New School; Yale University; St Antony's College, Oxford; Balliol College, Oxford

Faisal Devji FRHistS (born 1964) is a historian who specializes in studies of Islam, globalization, violence and ethics. Formerly the Director of the Asian Studies Centre at St Antony's College, Oxford, he is the current Beit Professor of Global and Imperial History at the University of Oxford and a fellow of Balliol College.

== Life and career ==
Devji was born in Dar es Salaam in 1964 to a family of western Indian origin. His undergraduate education was at the University of British Columbia, where he received double honors in history and anthropology. He received his PhD from the University of Chicago with his dissertation Muslim Nationalism: Founding Identity in Colonial India and was chosen to be a Junior Fellow at the Harvard Society of Fellows. His doctoral supervisor was Fazlur Rahman Malik.

After leaving Harvard he became head of graduate studies at the Institute of Ismaili Studies in London. Devji returned to academic life in 2003, holding faculty positions at the University of Chicago, Yale University and The New School before joining the University of Oxford in 2009. Initially appointed a Reader in South Asian History, he was awarded the Title of Distinction of Professor of Indian History by the university in September 2018. In October 2025, he took up the newly-renamed position of Beit Professor of Global and Imperial History at Balliol College, Oxford.

Devji is Zanzibari, and is now a Canadian citizen. In addition to his Oxford professorship, he is a senior fellow at the Institute for Public Knowledge (New York University) and Yves Oltramar Chair at the Graduate Institute of International and Development Studies in Geneva.

== Research ==
Devji's multidisciplinary work grounds empirical historical issues in philosophical questions.

In 2005, Cornell University Press published his Landscapes of the Jihad: Militancy, Morality, Modernity, exploring the ethical content of jihad as opposed to its more widely studied purported political content. The book draws a distinction between the majority of Islamic fundamentalist organizations concerned with the establishing of states and al-Qaeda with its decentralized structure and emphasis on moral rather than political action. His next book was The Terrorist in Search of Humanity: Militant Islam and Global Politics, published by Columbia University Press in October 2008.

== Bibliography ==
- Landscapes of the Jihad: Militancy, Morality, Modernity (Ithaca: Cornell University Press, 2005)
- The Terrorist in Search of Humanity: Militant Islam and Global Politics (New York: Columbia University Press, 2008)
- The Impossible Indian: Gandhi and the Temptations of Violence (Cambridge, MA: Harvard University Press, 2012)
- Muslim Zion: Pakistan as a Political Idea (Cambridge, MA: Harvard University Press, 2013)
- Political Thought in Action: The Bhagavad Gita and Modern India (co-editor with Shruti Kapila; Cambridge: Cambridge University Press, 2013)
- Islam After Liberalism (co-editor with Zaheer Kazmi; New York: Oxford University Press, 2017)
- Waning Crescent: The Rise and Fall of Global Islam (New Haven, CT: Yale University Press, 2025)
