= James Belich (historian) =

New Zealand historian (born 1956)

James Belich ONZM
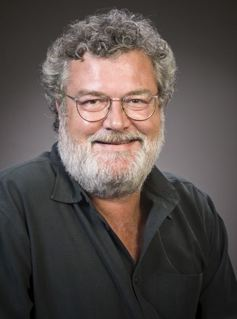
- Belich in 2010
- Born: 1956 (age 69–70); Wellington, New Zealand
- Relatives: Jim Belich (father); Camilla Belich (niece)
- Awards: Prime Minister's Awards for Literary Achievement (2011)

Academic background
- Education: Victoria University of Wellington; Nuffield College, Oxford

Academic work
- Discipline: History
- Website: University of Oxford profile

James Christopher Belich ONZM (born 1956) is a New Zealand historian, known for his work on the New Zealand Wars and on New Zealand history more generally. One of his major works on the 19th-century clash between Māori and Pākehā, the revisionist study The New Zealand Wars (1986), was also published in an American edition and adapted into a television series and DVD.

In 2011, Belich was appointed the Beit Professor of Imperial and Commonwealth History, and he is a co-founder and former director of the Oxford Centre for Global History at the University of Oxford. He retired from the chair in 2024.

== Background ==
Of Croatian descent, Belich was born in Wellington in 1956, the son of Jim Belich, who later became the mayor of Wellington. Educated at Onslow College, he went on to study at Victoria University of Wellington, where he earned a Master of Arts degree in history. He was awarded a Rhodes Scholarship in 1978 and went to the University of Oxford to complete his DPhil at Nuffield College.

== Academic career ==
Belich lectured at Victoria University of Wellington for several years before moving to the University of Auckland. His book The New Zealand Wars won the international Trevor Reese Memorial Prize in 1987. Based on his Dphil thesis, it was turned into a documentary series for Television New Zealand, called The New Zealand Wars, in 1998. This was a five-part series with Belich presenting. His revisionist account of the wars had a substantial impact on New Zealand popular opinion. It was controversial for its claim that the Crown had not been victorious in the wars, and that northern Maori invented trench warfare.

I Shall Not Die': Titokowaru's War (1990), based on his MA thesis, was also highly praised, winning the Adam Award for New Zealand literature. Belich has written a two-volume work A History of the New Zealanders, consisting of Making Peoples (1996) and Paradise Reforged (2001).

In 2007, he moved from the University of Auckland to a professorship at Victoria University, and was appointed professor of history at the Stout Research Centre for New Zealand Studies. He expanded his area of research to colonial societies in general and the place of settler colonialism in world history with Replenishing the Earth (2009). The book was the choice of Maya Jasanoff in a list of the 11 best scholarly books of the 2010s by The Chronicle of Higher Education.

In 2011, he remained professor of history at Victoria University's Stout Research Centre for New Zealand Studies. That year, Belich was appointed Beit Professor of Commonwealth History at the University of Oxford, where he is a former director and co-founder of the Oxford Centre for Global History. In 2023, he remained Professor of Global and Imperial History at Balliol College, Oxford. His book The World the Plague Made: The Black Death and the Rise of Europe was shortlisted for the Wolfson History Prize in 2023.

== Honours and awards ==
In the 2006 Queen's Birthday Honours, Belich was appointed an Officer of the New Zealand Order of Merit, for service to historic research.

Belich was the winner of the non-fiction category at the 2011 Prime Minister's Awards for Literary Achievement His book, The World the Plague Made, was shortlisted for the 2023 Wolfson History Prize.

== Works ==
- Titokowaru's War and Its Place in New Zealand's History. MA Thesis. Victoria University of Wellington, 1979.
- New Zealand Wars 1845–1870: An Analysis of Their History and Interpretation. 1982. PhD Thesis. Nuffield College/Oxford University
- I Shall Not Die: Tītokowaru's war, New Zealand, 1868-9. Bridget Williams Books, 1993. ISBN 0-04-614022-0
- Making Peoples: A History of the New Zealanders from Polynesian Settlement to the End of the Nineteenth Century. Penguin, 2007. ISBN 978-0-14-300704-3
- The New Zealand Wars and the Victorian Interpretation of Racial Conflict. Auckland University Press, 1986. ISBN 1-86940-002-X
- Paradise Reforged: A History of the New Zealanders from the 1880s to the Year 2000. University of Hawai'i Press, 2001. ISBN 0-8248-2542-X
- Replenishing the Earth: The Settler Revolution and the Rise of the Anglo-World, 1783–1939. Oxford University Press, 2009. ISBN 978-0-19-929727-6
- The Prospect of Global History. co-edited with John Darwin, Margret Frenz and Chris Wickham. Oxford University Press, 2016. ISBN 978-0-19-873225-9
- The World the Plague Made: The Black Death and the Rise of Europe. Princeton University Press, 2022. ISBN 978-0-691-21566-2

== See also ==
- Croatian New Zealanders
- List of historians
- New Zealand literature
- New Zealand Wars
- New Zealand history
