= Harold Drayton =

Guyanese academic (1929–2018)

- Born: Harold Alexander Drayton; 20 August 1929; Georgetown, Guyana
- Died: 11 March 2018 (aged 88); Gaithersburg, Maryland, United States
- Education: Queen's College; University College of the West Indies; University of Edinburgh
- Occupation: Academic
- Known for: Instrumental role in establishing University of Guyana
- Notable work: An Accidental Life (2017)
- Children: 2, inc. Richard Drayton

Harold Drayton (20 August 1929 – 11 March 2018) was a Guyanese academic, who was instrumental in the establishment of the University of Guyana.

== Biography ==
Harold Alexander Drayton was born in Georgetown, Guyana, on 20 August 1929. His father Alexander (Alec) Drayton was from a "coloured" or brown family of mixed European/African descent; his mother Agnes Da Camara was Portuguese. Drayton first attended St. Theresa's Private School in Georgetown, then went to Modern High School and in 1946 to Queen's College. In 1948, he won an open scholarship to the University College of the West Indies in Jamaica; however, he was soon expelled as a consequence of his left-wing political activism. He went on to graduate from the University of Edinburgh in Scotland with a BSc (Honours) degree (1958) and a PhD in 1960 on cancer virology. He served as the first President of the Federation of West Indian Student Unions of the United Kingdom.

In the late 1950s, he worked as a high-school teacher in Grenada and Jamaica, and in 1962 he became a lecturer in zoology at the Kwame Nkrumah University of Science and Technology in Kumasi, Ghana. While there, aged 32, he was contacted by Cheddi Jagan, the Guyanese prime minister at the time, and invited to return to assume major responsibility for establishing the University of Guyana as an autonomous national institution for higher education. According to Drayton's son Richard, a "letter of January 1962 appointed him [Drayton] Cheddi's personal representative in Ghana, and instructed him to seek advice from W. E. B. DuBois. He met with DuBois in Accra in June 1962. Later in December he visited J. D. Bernal at Birkbeck in London to seek counsel. Back in Georgetown he wrote the White Paper on Higher Education which in February 1963 went to Parliament. He recommended the appointment of the distinguished left scientist Lancelot Hogben as Vice Chancellor." The new University of Guyana was opened in October 1963, with Drayton being appointed as the first Deputy Vice-Chancellor of the University of Guyana. In addition, he lectured at the University of Guyana.

Moving to Barbados, Drayton served as a Caribbean Regional Advisor in Human Resources Development for the Pan-American Health Organization (PAHO), and was subsequently Director of the Center for International Health of the University of Texas at Galveston.

His autobiography, An Accidental Life, was published in 2017 by Hansib Publications. In the words of George Lamming: "Whether it was the cut and thrust of university debate, or the more frightening turbulence of Guyana's political leadership struggles of the 1960s, Drayton features as a critical witness and participant. An Accidental Life is the portrait of an era which defines the modern Caribbean and the long decisive process of decolonisation during the second half of the twentieth century." More than 900 pages in length, the book on its launch was described as "a classic Caribbean story" through which "the thread of migration runs".

Drayton died aged 88, on 11 March 2018, in Gaithersburg, Maryland, United States.
