= Agios Ilias, Cyprus =

Agios Ilias: Άγιος Ηλίας (Greek); Yarköy (Turkish)
- Location within Cyprus
- Coordinates: 35°19′40″N 33°55′40″E
- Country (de jure): Cyprus
  - District: Famagusta District
- Country (de facto): Northern Cyprus
  - District: İskele District

Population (2011)
  - Total: 429

Agios Ilias (Greek: Άγιος Ηλίας "Saint Elias"; Turkish: Yarköy "village of a cliff", previously Ayiliya) is a village in the Famagusta District of Cyprus, located 6 kilometres (3.7 mi) north-east of Trikomo. It is under the de facto control of Northern Cyprus.

Traditionally, Agios Ilias was primarily inhabited by Greek-speaking Orthodox Christians. In 1973, it had 355 inhabitants, all of whom were Greek Cypriot. In August 1974, they were forced to flee their village by the approaching Turkish army. Today, Agios Ilias is inhabited by settlers from the Denizli Province of Turkey.

The first school was established in the village during the Ottoman period, in 1865. Before then, the village priests (and perhaps monks) provided some teaching from religious books held in the church.

== Notable people ==
- Andrekos Varnava (born 1979), professor, academic, historian and author, mother from Agios Ilias.
