= Joycelynne Loncke =

University of Guyana academic (1941–2021)

Joycelynne Eleanor Loncke (3 February 1941 – 24 December 2021) was a Guyanese academic who was a professor emeritus at the University of Guyana. Her areas of interest included French literature and the history of music.

== Life and career ==
Loncke was born in Georgetown, British Guiana on 3 February 1941, into a prominent musical family; a number of her relatives studied overseas and then returned to Guyana to teach or perform. She completed her undergraduate education at the University of the West Indies (UWI) in Mona, Jamaica, as Guyana did not yet have its own university at that time. She chose to study French due to UWI's lack of a music program, but continued receiving private lessons. Loncke later undertook further studies at the Sorbonne (Grad.Dip.) and Somerville College, Oxford (Ph.D.). Her doctoral thesis was written on the topic of music in French literature, and her other works include a biography of N. E. Cameron.

Loncke lectured at UWI for a period, but eventually returned to her homeland to take up a position in the Department of Modern Languages at the fledgling University of Guyana. She served for periods as head of department, dean of the Faculty of Arts, and deputy vice-chancellor, eventually being made a professor emeritus in 2010. She maintained her interest in music, and oversaw the introduction of the university's first music curriculum. Loncke was made a Chevalier of the Ordre des Arts et des Lettres in 1974, and has been awarded the Golden Arrow of Achievement (1980) and the Cacique's Crown of Honour (1987) by the Guyanese government. She died on 24 December 2021, at the age of 80.
