= The Parliament of Man =

2006 book by Paul Kennedy

The Parliament of Man: The Past, Present, and Future of the United Nations
- Author: Paul Kennedy
- Language: English
- Subject: United Nations
- Genre: Non-fiction
- Publication date: 2006
- ISBN: 0-375-50165-7

The Parliament of Man: The Past, Present, and Future of the United Nations is a book by Paul Kennedy that covers the history and evolution of the United Nations. The book's title is taken from Locksley Hall, a poem by Alfred Lord Tennyson that talks about the future of warfare and the possibility of utopia. It was released in 2006 (ISBN 0-375-50165-7).

In this book, Kennedy argues that the importance of the United Nations is often underestimated, especially by Great Powers when their own interests are threatened. However, since 1945, the United Nations has been at the head of a globalising process that is now so powerful that it is beyond the control of any one country, no matter how strong it may think it is. In this context, there is a need to revitalise the United Nations to confront the myriad problems that all of humanity now faces.
