= Stephen Constantine (historian) =

British historian

Stephen Constantine FRHistS
- Born: 13 June 1947 (age 79)

Academic background
- Education: Wadham College, Oxford (BA); Nuffield College, Oxford (DPhil)

Academic work
- Discipline: Historian
- Institutions: University of Lancaster
- Main interests: St Helena; Gibraltar; Empire Marketing Board

Stephen Constantine (born 13 June 1947) is professor emeritus of modern British history at Lancaster University. He received his BA from Wadham College, Oxford, in 1968 and his D.Phil from Oxford, in 1984. Constantine joined Lancaster University in 1971 and retired in 2010. He is a fellow of the Royal Historical Society.

== Career ==
Alexandra Square, Lancaster University

Constantine's research relates to the history of St Helena, the history of Gibraltar, the publicity campaigns of the Empire Marketing Board, migration and settlement into and around the British Empire and Commonwealth, and the dispatch overseas as child migrants of children in care in the UK.

== Selected publications ==
=== 1980s ===
- Constantine, S. (1980), Unemployment in Britain Between the Wars, Seminar Studies in History, London: Longman, ISBN 9780582352322
- Constantine, S. (1983), Social Conditions in Britain 1918-1939, Lancaster Pamphlets, London: Methuen Publishing, ISBN 9780416360103
- Constantine, S. (1984), The Making of British Colonial Development Policy 1914-1940, London: Frank Cass, ISBN 978-0714632049
- Constantine, S. (1986), Buy and Build: The Advertising Posters of the Empire Marketing Board, London: Her Majesty's Stationery Office, ISBN 978-0114402006

=== 1990s ===
- Constantine, S. (1992), Dominions Diary: The Letters of E.J. Harding 1913-1916., Halifax: Keele University Press, ISBN 978-1853310188
- Constantine, S. (1992), Lloyd George, Lancaster Pamphlets, London: Routledge, ISBN 9780415065733
- Constantine, S.; Cockshut, A.O.J. (1994), Edward Gibbon: Memoirs of My Life and Writings, Keele University Press, ISBN 978-1853310270
- Constantine, S.; Kirby, M.W.; Rose, M.B., eds. (1995), The First World War in British History, London: Edward Arnold, ISBN 978-0340645314

=== 2000s ===
- Constantine, S. (2009), Community and identity: the making of modern Gibraltar since 1704, Manchester: Manchester University Press, doi:10.7228/manchester/9780719076350.001.0001, ISBN 978-0719080548
- Constantine, S.; Harper, M. (2010), Migration and empire, Oxford History of the British Empire, Oxford: Oxford University Press, doi:10.1093/acprof:oso/9780199250936.001.0001, ISBN 9780199250936
