= The Journal of Imperial and Commonwealth History =

- Discipline: History
- Language: English
- Edited by: Andrekos Varnava

Publication details
- History: 1972–present
- Publisher: Routledge/Taylor & Francis
- Frequency: Bimonthly

Standard abbreviations
- ISO 4: J. Imp. Commonw. Hist.

Indexing
- ISSN: 0308-6534 (print); 1743-9329 (web)
- LCCN: 81649122
- OCLC no.: 1089553

Links
- Journal homepage; Online access; Online archive

The Journal of Imperial and Commonwealth History is a peer-reviewed academic journal covering the history of the British Empire, colonial and settler colonial histories, Commonwealth histories and comparative European colonial experiences. It was established in 1972 by Trevor Reese. It was first published by Frank Cass and more recently by Taylor & Francis. There are six issues per year.

As of 2026 the most read/downloaded article of all time is 'The Scramble for East Africa: British Motives Reconsidered, 1884–95' written by Jonas Fossli Gjersø in 2015. Additionally, as of 2026 the most cited is 'The imperialism of decolonization' written by Wm. Roger Louis and Ronald Robinson in 1994.

Editors-in-Chief

1972 to 1976 Trevor Reese

1976 to 1981 P.J. Marshall and Glyndwr Williams

1981 to 1982 Andrew Porter and Bernard Porter

1983 to 1989 Andrew Porter and Rob Holland

1990 to 2007 Anthony Stockwell and Peter Burroughs

2008 to 2021 Philip Murphy and Stephen Howe

2022 to 2024 Stephen Howe

2025- Andrekos Varnava

== Abstracting and indexing ==
The journal is abstracted and indexed in:

- America: History and Life
- Arts & Humanities Citation Index
- British Humanities Index
- CSA Worldwide Political Science Abstracts
- Current Contents/Arts & Humanities
- Humanities International Index
- International Bibliography of the Social Sciences
- Scopus
- Sociological Abstracts
