= Andrew Porter (historian) =

British historian (1945–2021)

Andrew Neil Porter (12 October 1945 – 4 March 2021) was Rhodes Professor of Imperial History at King's College London from 1993 to 2008. Between 1979 and 1990, he edited the Journal of Imperial and Commonwealth History. He was educated at Christ's Hospital and St John's College, Cambridge (MA, PhD).

== Selected publications ==
Books

- The Origins of the South African War: Joseph Chamberlain and the diplomacy of imperialism, 1895‑99. St. Martin's, New York, 1980.
- Victorian shipping, business and imperial policy: Donald Currie, the Castle Line, and southern Africa. Boydell & Brewer, Woodbridge, 1986. ISBN 0861932056
- European Imperialism, 1860–1914. Palgrave, 1994.
- The Oxford history of the British Empire: Vol. III The nineteenth century, Oxford University Press, Oxford, 1999. (Editor)
- Religion versus empire? British protestant missionaries and overseas expansion, 1700–1914. Manchester University Press, Manchester, 2004. ISBN 9780719028236

Articles

"The South African war and the historians" in African Affairs, Vol. 99, No. 397 (Oct., 2000), pp. 633–648.
