= P. J. Marshall =

British historian (1933–2025)

P. J. Marshall CBE FRHistS FBA
- Born: 28 October 1933; Calcutta, Bengal Presidency, British India
- Died: 28 July 2025 (aged 91)

Academic background
- Education: Wellington College, Berkshire; Wadham College, Oxford

Academic work
- Discipline: History

Peter James Marshall CBE FRHistS FBA (28 October 1933 – 26 July 2025) was a British historian known for his work on the British Empire, particularly the activities of British East India Company servants in 18th-century Bengal, and also the history of British involvement in North America during the same period.

== Background ==
Marshall was born in Calcutta on 28 October 1933. His father was a businessman and administrative secretary to the zoological gardens in that city. On his mother's side one member was a forest officer and another member was an indigo planter who later worked as secretary to Dwarkanath Tagore. He was educated at Wellington College, Berkshire, and, following national service with the 7th (Kenya) Battalion, King's African Rifles, he took a first-class honours degree in history at Wadham College, Oxford, from which he received a D.Phil. in 1962.

Marshall died on 26 July 2025, at the age of 91.

== Academic career and professional activities ==
Between 1959 and 1993, he taught in the history department at King's College London. He was appointed Rhodes Professor of Imperial History in 1980, in which post he remained until his retirement.

Between 1965 and 1978, he served as a Member of the Editorial Committee for The Correspondence of Edmund Burke, and between 1975 and 1981 he was Editor of The Journal of Imperial and Commonwealth History. He sat on the History Working Group for National Curriculum in England in 1989 and 1990. In 1987 he was appointed Vice-President of the Royal Historical Society, serving as President between 1997 and 2001. He has been a notable benefactor to the Society.

He was an Emeritus Rhodes Professor of Imperial History at King's College London, where he continued to lecture.

== British in India ==
Marshall presented a revisionist interpretation, rejecting the view that the prosperity of Mughal Bengal gave way to poverty and anarchy in the colonial period. He instead argued that the British takeover did not mark any sharp break with the past. After 1765, British control was delegated largely through regional rulers and was sustained by a generally prosperous economy for the rest of the 18th century. Marshall also noted that the British raised revenue through local tax administrators and kept the old Mughal rates of taxation. His interpretation of colonial Bengal, at least until c. 1820, was one in which the British were not in full control, but instead were actors in what was primarily an Indian play, and in which their ability to keep power depended upon excellent co-operation with Indian elites. Marshall admitted that much of his interpretation was still contested by many historians.

== Selected publications ==
- The Impeachment of Warren Hastings (Oxford University Press, 1965) ISBN 9780198218265
- The Correspondence of Edmund Burke, vol. V, (Cambridge, 1965) (Assistant Editor)
- The Correspondence of Edmund Burke, vol. VII, (Cambridge, 1968) (Assistant Editor)
- East Indian Fortunes: The British in Bengal in the Eighteenth Century, (Oxford, 1976) ISBN 9780198215660
- The Correspondence of Edmund Burke, vol. X, (Cambridge, 1978) (Assistant Editor)
- The Great Map of Mankind: British Perceptions of the World in the Age of Enlightenment (London, 1982) (Co-editor with G. Williams) ISBN 9780460045544
- The New Cambridge History of India, II, 2, Bengal: the British Bridgehead: Eastern India, 1740 – 1828, (Cambridge, 1988)
- The Oxford History of the British Empire, vol. II, The Eighteenth Century, (Oxford, 1998) (Contributor & Editor)
- 'A Free Though Conquering People': Eighteenth-century Britain and its Empire (Aldershot, 2003) ISBN 9780860789130
- The Making and Unmaking of Empires: Britain, India and America c. 1750 – 1783 (Oxford, 2005) ISBN 9780199226665
- Edmund Burke and the British Empire in the West Indies: Wealth, Power, and Slavery (Oxford, 2019) ISBN 9780198841203

== Awards ==
- Doctor of Literature honoris causa by the School of Advanced Study at the University of London, December 2008
- Commander of the Order of the British Empire
- Fellow of the British Academy

== Legacy ==
A Junior Research Fellowship bearing his name, and jointly administered by the Royal Historical Society and the Institute of Historical Research at the University of London, where he was an honorary Fellow, is awarded annually to a doctoral student in history.

== Bibliography ==
- Marshall, P. J., East Indian Fortunes: The British in Bengal in the Eighteenth Century, (Oxford, 1976), pp. 284
- Marshall, P. J.,The Making and Unmaking of Empires: Britain, India and America c. 1750 – 1783, (Oxford, 2005), pp. 398

Academic offices
Preceded by Rees Davies	President of the Royal Historical Society; 1997–2001	Succeeded by Janet Nelson
