= Vincent T. Harlow =

English historian

Vincent Todd Harlow (1898–1961) was a prominent English historian of the British Empire.

From 1938 to 1949, he was the second Rhodes Professor of Imperial History at King's College London. In 1950, he succeeded Reginald Coupland as the Beit Professorship of Commonwealth History at the University of Oxford, a post he held until his death in 1963. His early work was on the seventeenth-century Caribbean but he is best known for his book, The Founding of the Second British Empire, 1763-1793, the first volume of which was published in 1952. His second volume, subtitled "New Continents and Changing Values", was published posthumously in 1964. The incomplete manuscript was edited by F. C. Madden.

== Works ==
- A History of Barbados 1625-1685 (1926)
