= John House =

British geographer

John William House (15 September 1919 – 31 January 1984) was a British geographer, who was Halford Mackinder Professor of Geography at the University of Oxford from 1974 to 1983.

== Life ==
House was born in 1919 and educated at Bradford Grammar School before studying geography at Jesus College, Oxford under the tuition of J. N. L. Baker. After service during the Second World War with the Intelligence Corps (leaving in 1946 with the rank of Major), he taught geography at King's College, Newcastle (then part of the University of Durham, but later Newcastle University) for 28 years; he was head of department from 1964 to 1974. He was appointed as the first Halford Mackinder Professor of Geography at the University of Oxford in 1974, a post he held until ill-health forced his retirement in 1983. He held a Fellowship of St Peter's College, Oxford in conjunction with his professorship. He was also President of the Institute of British Geographers. House died on 31 January 1984.

== Work ==
House's publications covered a number of topics, with a particular interest in applied geography and social issues. He addressed questions of industrialisation in Teesside and employment issues in the vicinity of Newcastle, and his first book was Industrial Britain: the North East (1969). After moving to Oxford and losing the administrative burdens of being head of department in Newcastle, he carried out more research on France (he was a talented linguist). France: An applied geography was published in 1978, and studied planning and change in France since the end of the Second World War. Other work included work on frontier regions within Europe and the American–Mexican frontier; his book, Frontier on the Rio Grande, was published in 1982.
