= Jacob Lambrechtsz. Loncke =

Dutch painter

- Born: 1580 the Netherlands
- Died: 1644 (aged 63–64)
- Occupation: painter
- Notable work: Portrait of Philippe le Mire (1618), Portrait of Antoinette Walleran, Wife of Philippe le Mire (1618), Portrait of Pieter Hoffer

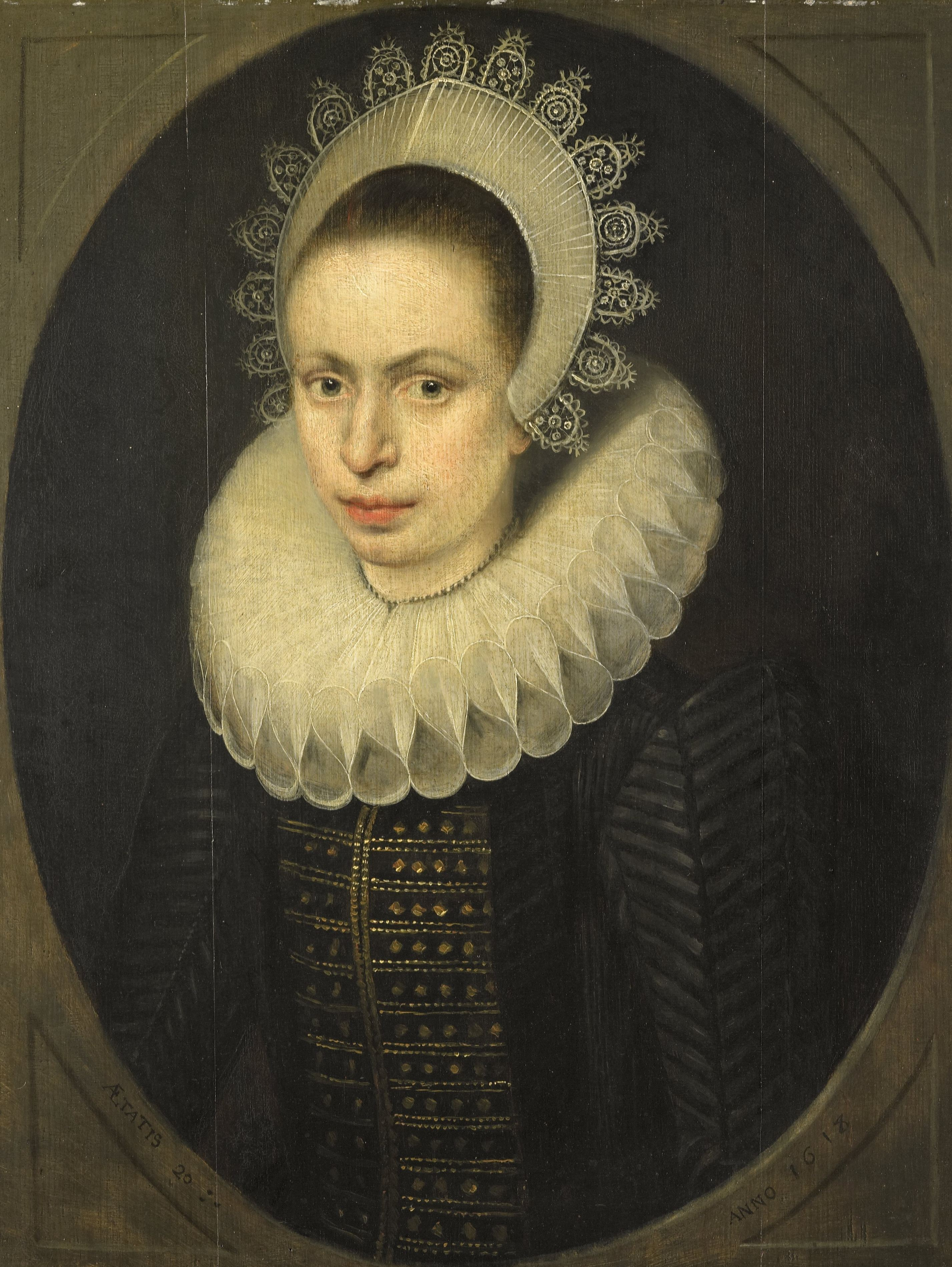
Portret van Antoinette Walleran, 1618

Jacob Lambrechtsz. Loncke (1580–1644) was a Dutch Golden Age painter from Zierikzee.

He was the son of Lambrecht Jeroen Pietersz Loncke and Mayke Cornelis Leijst and the brother of Rochus. He married Sara Rembrandtsdr Verboom, and married a second time to Marijken Waarsegger op 4 November 1625 in Zierikzee. Little is known of his life. He is known for portraits and in 1618 was deacon of the artists' guild in Zierikzee.
