= Beit Professor of Global and Imperial History =

Professorship at the University of Oxford

The Beit Professorship of Global and Imperial History is one of the senior professorships in history at the University of Oxford. It was established in 1905 as the Beit Professorship of Colonial History, and was known as the Beit Professorship of Commonwealth History until July 2023. It is the first imperial professorship in the United Kingdom. The post is held in conjunction with a fellowship at Balliol College, Oxford. The professorship's salary is principally drawn from the Beit fund, an endowment derived from Alfred Beit's donations to the university.

== Beit Professors ==
- Hugh Egerton (1905–1920)
- Sir Reginald Coupland (1920–1948)
- Vincent T. Harlow (1950–1963)
- John Andrew Gallagher (1963–1971)
- Ronald Robinson (1971–1987)
- Judith M. Brown (1990–2011)
- James Belich (2011–2024)
- Faisal Devji (2025–present)
