= Paul Kennedy =

British historian and academic

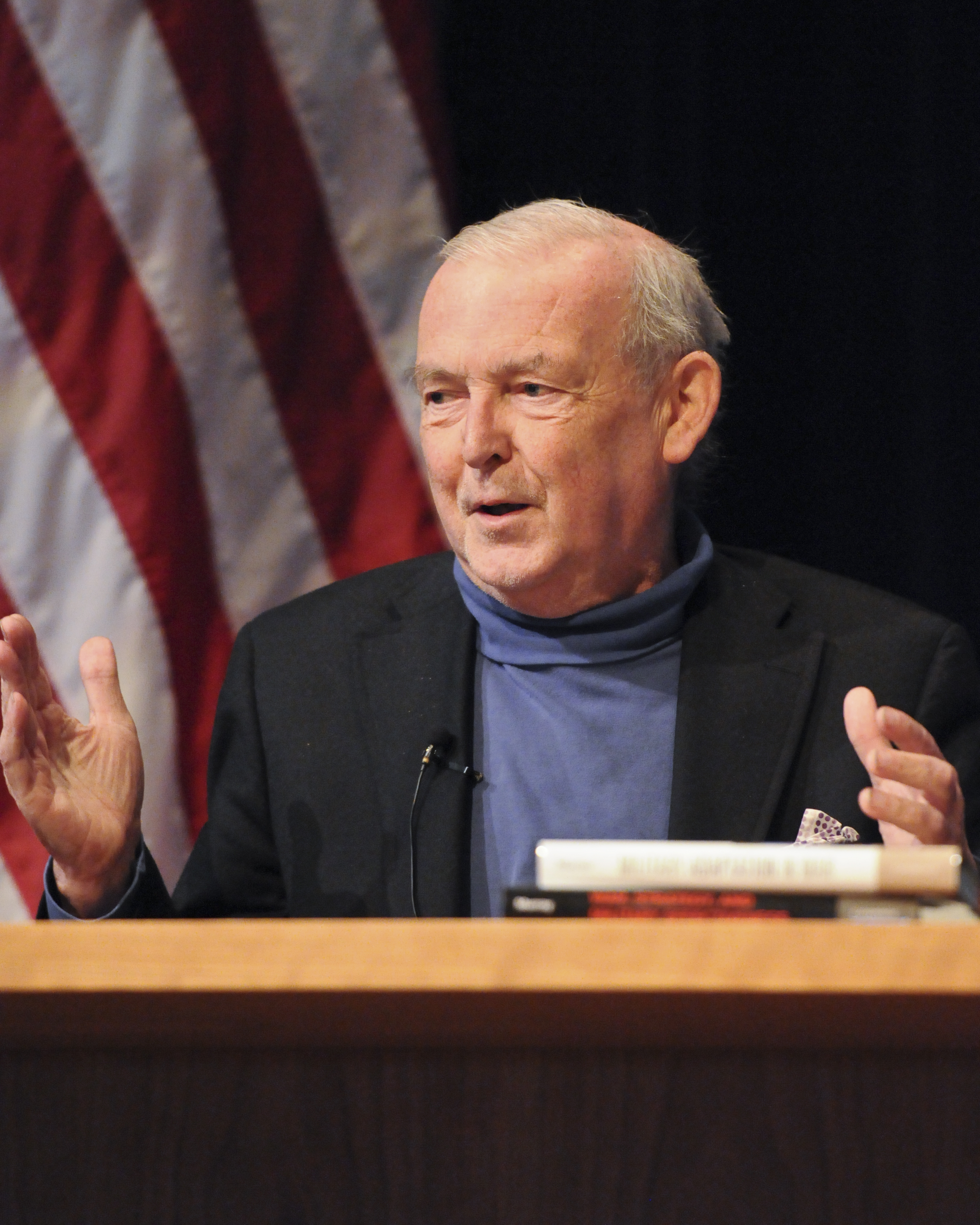
- Kennedy in 2012
- Born: 17 June 1945 (age 81); Wallsend, Northumberland, England

Academic background
- Education: Newcastle University (BA); St Antony's College, Oxford (DPhil)
- Doctoral advisor: A. J. P. Taylor; John Andrew Gallagher

Academic work
- Institutions: University of East Anglia; Yale University; London School of Economics
- Doctoral students: Richard Drayton; Matthew Connelly

Paul Michael Kennedy CBE FBA (born 17 June 1945) is a British historian specialising in the history of international relations, economic power and grand strategy. He is on the editorial board of numerous scholarly journals and writes for The New York Times, The Atlantic, and many foreign-language newspapers and magazines. His monthly column on current global matters is distributed worldwide by the Tribune Content Agency.

He has published on the history of British foreign policy and great power struggles, emphasizing the changing economic power base that undergirds military and naval strength, noting how declining economic power leads to reduced military and diplomatic weight.

== Life ==
Kennedy was born in Wallsend, Northumberland, and attended St. Cuthbert's Grammar School in Newcastle upon Tyne. Subsequently, he graduated with first-class honours in history from Newcastle University and obtained his doctorate from St Antony's College, Oxford, under the supervision of A. J. P. Taylor and John Andrew Gallagher. He was a member of the History Department at the University of East Anglia between 1970 and 1983. He is a Fellow of the Royal Historical Society, a former visiting fellow of the Institute for Advanced Study in Princeton, New Jersey, and of the Alexander von Humboldt Foundation in Germany. In 2007–2008, Kennedy was the Phillipe Roman Professor of History and International Affairs at the London School of Economics.

In 1983 he was named the J. Richardson Dilworth professor of British History at Yale. He is now also the Director of International Security Studies and along with John Lewis Gaddis and Charles Hill, teaches the Studies in Grand Strategy course there. In 2012, Professor Kennedy began teaching a course at Yale entitled "Military History of the West Since 1500", elaborating on his presentation of military history as inextricably intertwined with economic power and technological progress.

His most well known book, The Rise and Fall of the Great Powers, assesses the interaction between economics and strategy over the past five centuries. The book was very well received by fellow historians, with A. J. P. Taylor labelling it "an encyclopaedia in itself" and Sir Michael Howard crediting it as "a deeply humane book in the very best sense of the word". It has been translated into 23 languages.

In his 2006 book The Parliament of Man, Kennedy contemplates the past and future of the United Nations.

In 2010 he delivered the first Lucy Houston Lecture in Cambridge on the subject of "Innovation and Industrial Regeneration".

== Honours ==
Kennedy was elected to the American Academy of Arts and Sciences in 1989 and the American Philosophical Society in 1991. He was made a Commander of the Order of the British Empire in 2001 and elected a Fellow of the British Academy in 2003. The National Maritime Museum awarded him its Caird Medal in 2005 for his contributions to naval history. Kennedy was named the US Naval War College's Hattendorf Prize Laureate for 2014. Kennedy was awarded an honorary Doctor Of Letters by Durham University in 2026.

== Interpretations ==
=== The Rise and Fall of the Great Powers ===
In The Rise and Fall of the Great Powers (1987), Kennedy argues that economic strength and military power have been highly correlated in the rise and fall of major nations since 1500. He shows that expanding strategic commitments lead to increases in military expenditures that eventually overburden a country's economic base, and cause its long-term decline. His book reached a wide audience of policy makers when it suggested that the United States and the Soviet Union were presently experiencing the same historical dynamics that previously affected Spain, the Netherlands, France, Great Britain, and Germany, and that the United States must come to grips with its own "imperial overstretch".

However, the Cold War ended two years after Kennedy's book appeared, validating his thesis regarding the Soviet Union, but leaving the United States as the sole superpower and, apparently, at the peak of its economy.

In the text, Kennedy predicted the rise of China, noting that it was undergoing economic development which could transform the country in decades and that it was "only a matter of time" before China became a great power.

Nau (2001) contends that Kennedy's realist model of international politics underestimates the power of national, domestic identities or the possibility of the ending of the Cold War and the growing convergence of democracy and markets resulting from the democratic peace that followed.

=== World War I ===
In explaining why neutral Britain went to war with Germany, Kennedy (1980) recognised it was critical for war that Germany became economically more powerful than Britain, but he downplays the disputes over economic trade imperialism, the Baghdad Railway, confrontations in Eastern Europe, high-charged political rhetoric and domestic pressure-groups. Germany's reliance time and again on sheer power, while Britain increasingly appealed to moral sensibilities, played a role, especially in seeing the invasion of Belgium as a necessary military tactic or a profound moral crime. The German invasion of neutral Belgium was not important because the British decision had already been made and the British were more concerned with the fate of France (pp. 457–62). Kennedy argues that by far the main reason was London's fear that a repeat of 1870, when Prussia and the German states smashed France, would mean that Germany, with a powerful army and navy, would control the English Channel and northwest France. British policy-makers insisted that that would be a catastrophe for British security.

== Notable students ==
- Geoffrey Wawro (PhD 1992)
- Richard Drayton (PhD 1999)
- Fareed Zakaria (BA 1986)
- Frederick Kagan (PhD 1995)

== Bibliography ==
External videos
- Booknotes interview with Kennedy on Preparing for the 21st Century, March 19, 1993, C-SPAN

- Planning for War at Sea: 400 Years of Great Power Competition, edited by Evan Wilson and Paul Kennedy. (2025) ISBN 978-1-61251-725-4
- Victory at Sea: Naval Power and the Transformation of the Global Order in World War II (2022)
- Navies in Multipolar Worlds: From the Age of Sail to the Present, edited by Paul Kennedy and Evan Wilson. (2020) ISBN 978-0-367-69289-6
- Engineers of Victory: The Problem Solvers Who Turned the Tide in the Second World War (2013) ISBN 978-1-4000-6761-9
- The Parliament of Man: The Past, Present, and Future of the United Nations (2006) ISBN 0-375-50165-7
- From War to Peace: Altered Strategic Landscapes in the Twentieth Century co-editor (2000) ISBN 0-300-08010-7
- Preparing for the Twenty-first Century (1993) ISBN 0-394-58443-0
- Grand Strategies in War and Peace (editor) (1991) ISBN 0-300-04944-7
- The Rise of the Anglo-German Antagonism, 1860–1914 (2nd edn. 1988) ISBN 1-57392-301-X
- The Rise and Fall of the Great Powers: Economic Change and Military Conflict from 1500 to 2000 (1987) ISBN 0-394-54674-1
- The Rise and Fall of British Naval Mastery (1986) ISBN 1-57392-278-1 (2nd edn. 2006) ISBN 1-59102-374-2
- The First World War and the International Power System (1984)
- Strategy and Diplomacy 1870–1945 (1983) ISBN 0-00-686165-2
- The Realities Behind Diplomacy: Background Influences on British External Policy 1865–1980 (1981)
- The Rise of the Anglo-German Antagonism 1860–1914 (1980)
- Germany in the Pacific and Far East, 1870-1914 co-editor (1977)
- The Rise and Fall of British Naval Mastery (1976, paperback reissue 2001, 2004)
- The Samoan Tangle: A Study in Anglo-German-American Relations 1878–1900 (1974)
- Conquest: The Pacific War 1943–45 (1973)
- Pacific Onslaught 1941–43 (1972)
