= Judith M. Brown =

British historian

The Reverend Judith M. Brown FRHistS
- Born: 9 July 1944 (age 82); Gangtok, British Raj
- Occupations: Historian, academic, Anglican priest
- Spouse: Peter Diggle
- Honours: Raleigh Lecture on History (2012)

Academic background
- Education: Girton College, Cambridge

Judith Margaret Brown FRHistS (born 9 July 1944) is a British historian, academic and Anglican priest, who specialises in the study of modern South Asia.

== Early life and education ==
Brown was born in India to the Rev Wilfred George Brown and Joan Margaret Adams. She was educated in Britain, arriving at Girton College, Cambridge to read History in 1962 and receiving her PhD from the same institution in 1968. She spent the next two years as a research fellow at Girton and then became a tutorial fellow before leaving in 1970.

Brown felt the call to ordination when she was young, before the ordination of women was allowed in the Anglican Communion. She was trained at Ripon College Cuddesdon.

== Career ==
From 1990 to 2011, she was the Beit Professor of Commonwealth History and a Fellow of Balliol College, Oxford. Earlier she taught at the University of Manchester. She retired from teaching in 2011. Brown published widely on the history of modern South Asia, but is especially known for her work on Gandhi.

She was ordained in the Church of England as a deacon in 2009 and as a priest in 2010. From 2009 to 2010, she served her curacy at St Frideswide's Church, Osney, in the Diocese of Oxford. Since 2014, she has been an associate priest of St Mary Magdalen's Church, Oxford. She served as interim chaplain to Brasenose College, Oxford in 2017; the first woman to serve as chaplain of the college.

== Awards and honours ==
In 2000 Brown was awarded an honorary doctorate of social science from the University of Natal. She was elected to the Academia Europaea in 2011. Brown is also a fellow of the Royal Historical Society.

== Personal life ==
Brown married Peter Diggle in 1984.

== Selected bibliography ==
- Brown, Judith M. (1972), Gandhi's Rise to Power: Indian Politics 1915–1922. Cambridge: Cambridge University Press.
- Brown, Judith M. (1994), Modern India: The Origins of an Asian Democracy, Second Edition, Oxford: Oxford University Press. Pp. 480., ISBN 0-19-873113-2
- Brown, Judith M.; Louis, Wm. Roger, eds. (2001), Oxford History of the British Empire: The Twentieth Century, Oxford and New York: Oxford University Press. Pp. 800, ISBN 0-19-924679-3
- Brown, Judith M. (2005), Nehru: A Political Life, New Haven and London: Yale University Press. Pp. 416, ISBN 0-300-11407-9
- Brown, Judith M. (2006), Global South Asians: Introducing the modern Diaspora (New Approaches to Asian History), Cambridge: Cambridge University Press. Pp. 216, ISBN 0-521-60630-6
- Brown, Judith M. (2008), Gandhi and Civil Disobedience: The Mahatma in Indian Politics 1928-1934, Cambridge: Cambridge University Press. Pp. 436, ISBN 978-0-521-06695-2; 1st edition 1977
- Brown, Judith M.; Anthony Parel, eds. (2011), The Cambridge Companion to Gandhi, Cambridge: Cambridge University Press. Pp. 294, ISBN 0-521-60630-6

== See also ==
- British Raj
- Company rule in India
- Indian rebellion of 1857
