= University of Guyana =

National university

Coordinates: 6.81225°N 58.1171°W

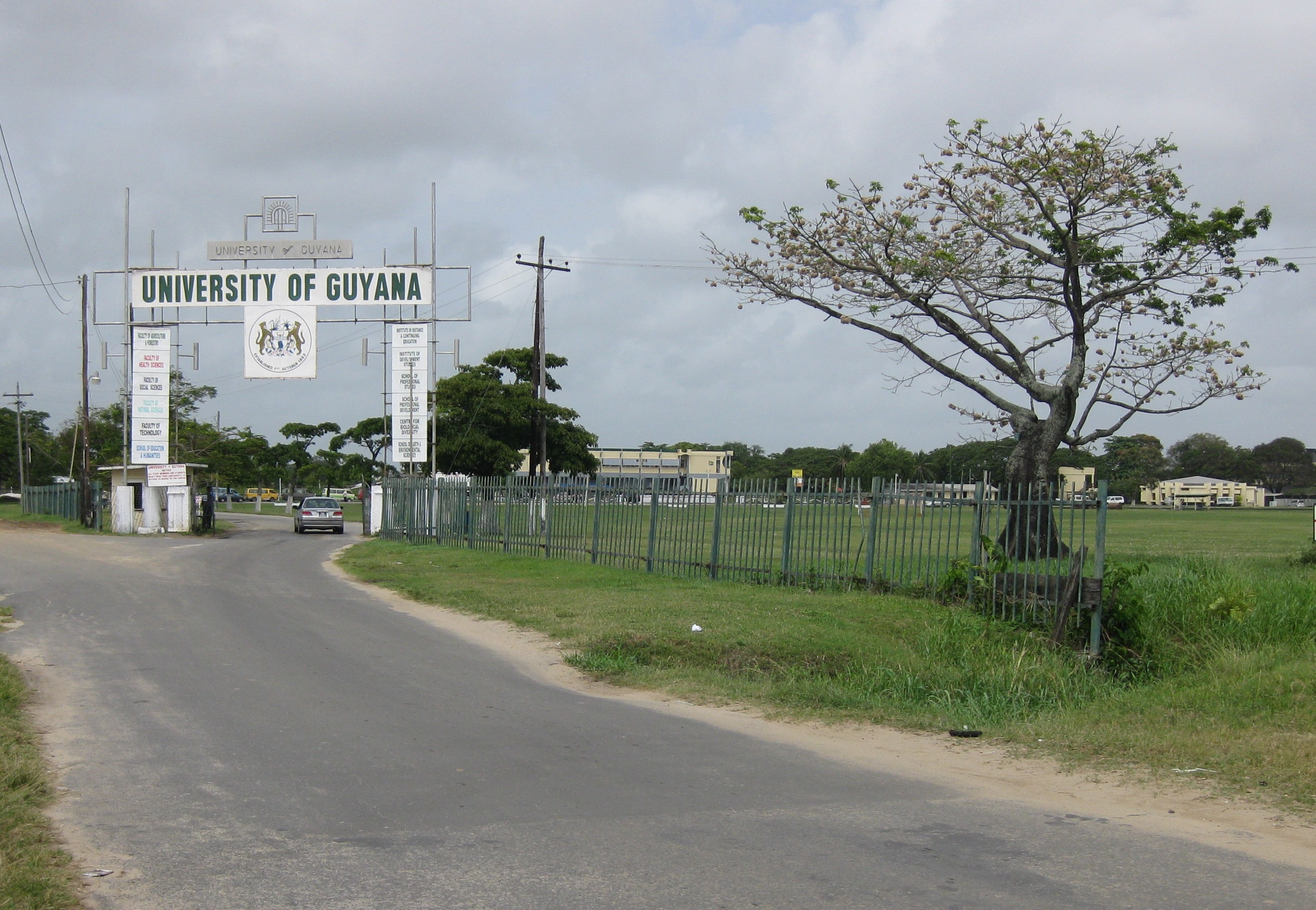
- Entrance to the University of Guyana
- Motto: "Serve Guyana"
- Type: Public university
- Established: April 1963; 63 years ago
- Affiliations: IHSE, Caribbean Community
- Chancellor: Prof. Edward Greene
- Vice-Chancellor: Prof. Paloma Mohamed-Martin
- Academic staff: 1,065 (2022) - (Academic & Administrative)
- Students: 11,000+ (2024)
- Location: Georgetown, Guyana
- Campus: Turkeyen Campus, Berbice Campus
- Tuition: Free (1976-1994, 2025 - Present) - (Guyanese Students)
- Colours: Green
- Nickname: UG
- Website: uog.edu.gy

The University of Guyana, in Georgetown, Guyana, is Guyana's national and most prestigious higher education institution. It was established in April 1963 and was the first national university of a Caribbean nation. The university's stated mission is: "To discover, generate, disseminate, and apply knowledge of the highest standard for the service of the community, the nation, and of all mankind within an atmosphere of academic freedom that allows for free and critical enquiry."

The University of Guyana offers more than 180 undergraduate and graduate programmes in over 80 disciplines. The university focuses on Natural Sciences, Engineering, Environmental Studies, Forestry, Urban Planning and Management, Tourism Studies, Education, Creative Arts, Economics, Law, Medicine, Optometry and Nursing among other areas of study. The university had its largest enrollment in 2024, with 4000 students, and has more than 71,000 alumni.

== University of Guyana: Other Campuses ==
The University of Guyana's Tain Campus became operational in 2000. It was established to make university education more accessible to Berbicians. In 2025, the university signed an agreement to open a new campus at Aishalton.

== History ==
Cheddi Jagan, then Premier of British Guiana, considered that the University of the West Indies, to which his government had contributed since 1948, was not meeting the demand of his countrymen for higher education. On 4 January 1962, Jagan wrote to Harold Drayton, then in Ghana, to ask him to seek the advice of W. E. B. Du Bois on starting a new university.

Drayton returned to British Guiana in December 1962, and it was on his advice that Jagan wrote to socialist scholars in the United Kingdom and United States, including Joan Robinson at the University of Cambridge, Paul Baran at Stanford University, and Lancelot Hogben at Birmingham to involve them in the recruitment of staff.

The university opened on the grounds of Queen's College on October 1, 1963. Its first chancellor was Edgar Mortimer Duke and its first Principal and Vice-Chancellor was the British biologist and mathematician Lancelot Hogben.

Guyana's 1964 general election held on 7 December saw the defeat of Cheddi Jagan's People's Progressive Party. Despite losing the election, Jagan refused to resign, and had to be removed by Governor Richard Luyt, with Forbes Burnham replacing him.

Burnham, as the new Prime Minister, relocated the University to lands donated by Bookers Agricultural Holdings. The University was then expanded to include more programmes, courses and faculties. By 1973, the University had lecturers from many countries, and its laboratories were described as meeting international standards. The University of Guyana was considered on par with the regional University of the West Indies in 1975. The following year, then Prime Minister Forbes Burnham abolished all University tuition and enshrined free education in the 1980 Constitution as a citizen's right. Tuition was reintroduced at the University in 1994 by the People's Progressive Party/Civic government. Tuition fees remained in place until 2025, when they were again abolished for Guyanese citizens.

The University of Guyana is Guyana's sole national higher education institution. It was established on April 18, 1963 with the following mission: “To discover, generate, disseminate, and apply knowledge of the highest standard for the service of the community, the nation, and of all mankind within an atmosphere of academic freedom that allows for free and critical enquiry.” At first, programmes were confined to the Arts, Natural Sciences, and Social Sciences. A Faculty of Education was created in 1967, followed by the Faculty of Technology in 1969, the Institute for Distance and Continuing Education (IDCE), which began as an extramural unit, in 1975, and the Faculties of Agriculture (1977) and Health Sciences (1981), the latter as an outgrowth of Natural Sciences.

A Forestry Unit was established in 1987 and subsequently became part of the Faculty of Agriculture, and in 2003 the Faculties of Arts and Education merged to become the School of Education and Humanities. Around the turn of the millennium, the School of Earth and Environmental Sciences (SEES) was formed through the merger of the Geography Department and the Environmental Studies Unit. Also created were the Biodiversity Centre, which supports the work of SEES and the Faculty of Agriculture and Forestry, and a Centre for Information Technology (CIT), which serves the entire university. The University of Guyana expanded in 2000 with the addition of the Tain Campus in the county of Berbice. In October 2016, as part of a broader reorganization, SEES was transformed into the Faculty of Earth and Environmental Studies, with a Dean as academic and administrative head of the unit.

== Organisation and Structure ==
The university offers certificate, diploma, associate degree, undergraduate degree, graduate (post-graduate) degree, and professional degree programmes. These programmes are delivered through the following nine organizational units, called Faculties, each of which is headed by a Dean:

- Faculty of Agriculture and Forestry,
- Faculty of Earth and Environmental Studies,
- Faculty of Education and Humanities,
- College of Medical Sciences,
- Faculty of Natural Sciences,
- Faculty of Social Sciences,
- Faculty of Engineering and Technology,
- College of Behavioural Sciences and Research, and
- School of Entrepreneurship and Business Innovation.

The university established its first doctoral program, the PhD in Biodiversity, in 2019. This program is interdisciplinary, spanning three Faculties: Earth and Environmental Sciences, Natural Sciences, and Agriculture and Forestry. The first graduates received their degrees in 2021.

=== Faculty of Agriculture and Forestry ===
The Faculty of Agriculture was established in 1977 offering a Bachelor of Science (B.Sc.) in Agriculture. A Diploma in Forestry was introduced in 1987 and the B.Sc. in Forestry in 1996. The Forestry Unit was initially under the Office of the Vice-Chancellor and was placed under the Faculty of Agriculture in November 1989. The curricula for both the Diploma and the B.Sc. in Forestry were extensively revised in September 2016. The Faculty also offers an M.Sc. in Agro-Technology and Business.

The Faculty of Agriculture was renamed the Faculty of Agriculture and Forestry in September 2002. Simultaneously, the Forestry Unit was upgraded to the Department of Forestry. To improve the quality of forestry education in Guyana, the UK Department for International Development provided funding through the Guyana Forestry Commission Support Project for a building for the Department of Forestry. This building was officially opened and handed over to the Faculty on October 25, 2002.

The Faculty's Research Station was launched on April 14, 2004. It is located on the Turkeyen Campus immediately east of the Faculty buildings.

Graduates of the Faculty work in the agricultural, fisheries and forestry sectors in Guyana and the region, including in middle and senior management positions in private and public enterprises.

=== Faculty of Earth and Environmental Studies ===
The Environmental Studies Unit (ESU) was established in 1993 for the purpose of promoting teaching and research and providing guidance to decision-makers and national agencies in the areas of natural resources management and environmental conservation. The ESU continued until 2005 when the School of Earth & Environmental Sciences (SEES) was established through a merger of the ESU and the Department of Geography (DoG). Following the merger, the degree programmes in Environmental Studies and Geography were offered within a single unit while retaining their separate identities. The merger expanded the areas of focus to include teaching and research in geographical information system (GIS) and remote sensing, which were then emerging fields in Guyana.

The School attained the status of Faculty of Earth and Environmental Sciences (FEES) on October 1, 2016. The Faculty provides tertiary education in the earth and environmental sciences and conducts interdisciplinary research and extension services (to those who are not enrolled in the regular programmes) in areas such as environmental management, sustainable land use planning, natural resources management, housing and settlement development, and earth surface dynamics.

In 2021, due to Guyana's shift toward becoming an oil-producing nation, the faculty introduced master's degrees in Oil and Gas and Renewable Energy, Natural Resources Management and Environmental Management.

=== Faculty of Education and Humanities ===
The Faculty of Education and Humanities was established in 2003 through a merger between the Faculty of Arts and the Faculty of Education. It comprises five Departments: Curriculum and Instruction, Foundation and Education Management, Language and Cultural Studies, Research and Graduate Studies and Social Studies.

=== Faculty of Natural Sciences ===
The Faculty of Natural Sciences has four departments: the Department of Biology, the Department of Chemistry, the Department of Computer Sciences and the Department of Mathematics, Physics and Statistics. As of 2024, the Department of Computer Science offered master's degrees in Artificial Intelligence.

=== Faculty of Social Sciences ===
The Faculty of Social Sciences is the largest faculty at the University of Guyana, with more than 1900 students enrolled in associate degree, diploma, bachelor's and master's programmes. The faculty provides teaching, research and professional training in the social sciences and contributes to national and regional academic and public-service activities.

The academic programmes offered in the Faculty of Social Sciences at the undergraduate level are: Associate Degree in Social Work, Diploma in Communication Studies, Diploma in Public Management, Bachelor of Social Science (Communication Studies), Bachelor of Social Science (Economics), Bachelor of Social Science (Business Economics), Bachelor of Laws, Bachelor of Social Science (International Relations), Bachelor of Social Science (Public Management), Bachelor of Social Science (Social Work) and Bachelor of Social Science (Sociology). The two programmes offered at the graduate level are: Commonwealth Masters in Business Administration and Commonwealth Masters in Public Administration.

=== Faculty of Engineering and Technology ===
The Faculty of Technology was established in 1969. From then until 1977, the regular academic programmes offered were the General Technical Diploma (GTD) and the Higher Technical Diploma (HTD) in Architecture and Building Technology, in Civil, Electrical and Mechanical Engineering.

Special one-year degree programmes were also offered in Public Health Engineering (1972) and Highway Engineering (1975). Certificate and Diploma courses in Industrial Management were introduced in 1972 and 1976 respectively. In 1978, the Faculty discontinued the GTD and HTD programmes and introduced the Diploma in Technology and Bachelor of Engineering in the aforementioned disciplines, as well as Bachelor of Science (Architecture) programmes. Majors in the Diploma in Technology were subsequently expanded to include Agricultural Engineering, Mining and Surveying. A Diploma in Technology programme in Aeronautical Engineering was introduced in 2005 in collaboration with the Art Williams/Harry Wendt Aeronautical School. All academic programmes are semester-based. The name was changed to Faculty of Engineering and Technology as of July 9, 2018.

The Faculty of Engineering & Technology comprises six departments. It offers four-year undergraduate BSc programmes that satisfy the academic requirements of the Council of Registered Professional Engineers for registration as Professional Engineers. In these engineering programmes, students must complete 10 months of industrial training, intended to give them exposure to the workplace.

The Faculty has an Advisory Board of members from industry, academia and the engineering profession, which advises the Faculty on standards for education and research and on curriculum review. The Faculty has used the Board to obtain input from industry for its curriculum design.

In 2019, an Associate of Science Degree in Petroleum Engineering was introduced. This was followed by the 2021 introduction of the Bachelor of Applied Science in Petroleum Engineering.

== Notable people ==
=== Alumni ===
- Carolyn Rodrigues, former foreign minister of Guyana
- Mahadai Das, Guyanese writer
- M. Jamal Deen, FRSC FCAE FINAE, Professor and Senior Canada Research Chair, McMaster University, Canada
- Odeen Ishmael, Guyanese diplomat and ambassador
- Merlin Udho, Guyanese educator and diplomat
- Denis Williams, Guyanese painter and archaeologist
- Shana Yardan, Indo-Guyanese poet

=== Faculty and administrators ===
- Joyce Sparer Adler, American critic, playwright, and teacher, as well as a founding faculty of the university in 1963
- Derek Bickerton, former lecturer, now Professor Emeritus of Linguistics at University of Hawai'i, Honolulu
- Horace B. Davis, United States Marxian economist
- Michael Gilkes, Guyanese writer and academic
- Stanley Greaves, Guyanese painter, former head of Creative Arts at the university
- Richard Hart, Jamaican lawyer and politician
- Lancelot Hogben, English zoologist and geneticist
- Abdur Rahman Slade Hopkinson, Guyanese writer and professor at the university (1966–68)
- Ali Mazrui, African and Islamic studies academic
- Clem Seecharan, Guyanese writer
- Bertrand Ramcharan, former Chancellor of the university
- Shridath Ramphal, former Guyanese foreign minister (1972–75) and the second Commonwealth Secretary General (1975–90)
- Walter Rodney, Pan-African writer and political theorist
- Rupert Roopnaraine, Guyanese writer, politician and academic
- Clive Y. Thomas, retired Professor of Economics and Director of the Institute of Development Studies

== See also ==
- Association of Commonwealth Universities
- University of the West Indies
