= Robert Crews =

Robert Denniston Crews (born in 1970) is an American historian and tenured Professor of History at Stanford University. His research focuses on Afghanistan, Russia, Central Asia, and Islam in global history. He is the author of For Prophet and Tsar: Islam and Empire in Russia and Central Asia (2006) and Afghan Modern: The History of a Global Nation (2015), both published by Harvard University Press, and serves on the editorial advisory board of Afghanistan, the peer‑reviewed journal of the American Institute of Afghanistan Studies published by Edinburgh University Press. He has previously served as that journal's editor-in-chief.

Crews’ scholarship has been discussed and evaluated in The American Historical Review, Slavic Review, Foreign Affairs, the London Review of Books, and The New York Review of Books. His work is also frequently cited in public‑facing analysis about Afghanistan and the Taliban. He served on the Selection Committee for the American Historical Association's John F. Richards Prize in South Asian History, from 2024 to 2025.

He appeared on the Lex Fridman Podcast in 2021.

== Background ==
Crews received a Bachelors degree from the University of North Carolina at Chapel Hill, an MA in History from Columbia University and a PhD degree in History from Princeton University.

== Views ==
Writing in February 2022, Crews highlights the Taliban's record of gender-based oppression and violence, including anti-Hazara atrocities, during the 1996–2001 emirate. He also explains their resurgence after 2001 through (what he considers to be) U.S. and NATO mistakes, such as civilian casualties, corruption, and flawed state-building. Crews states that while the U.S. government talked about establishing genuine democracy in Afghanistan, "...in practice, Washington undermined elections to ensure their favorites retained control of a highly centralized government, undercutting the credibility of alternatives to the Taliban". Crews states the Taliban used these issues in their propaganda while creating shadow governance and adopting modern media to present themselves as a “state in waiting.” Crews is critical of the Doha deal in 2020 and the subsequent U.S. withdrawal, stating that these developments opened the way for the Taliban's return to power in August 2021. However, Crews argues that the movement now faces challenges of governance amid economic collapse, drought, and public resistance, particularly from women: The Taliban are trying to portray themselves as both pious Islamist rulers and anti-imperial nationalists, positioning themselves against ISIS-K.

== Reception of work ==
Crews' work on Afghanistan has been described as "seeking to disrupt narratives ignoring Afghan agency in the twenty-first century".

=== The Taliban and the Crisis of Afghanistan ===
A review from the Air & Space Power Journal describes The Taliban and the Crisis of Afghanistan, (edited by Crews) as a “must-read” synthesis. The review highlights three main themes. First, it notes the historical contexts that restrict viewing the Taliban as solely an Afghan or Pashtun movement. Second, it discusses the ongoing challenges of building a state. Third, it addresses the country’s deep internal diversity and the dynamics between local and central power, including ethnic tensions. The reviewer, Jack D. Kem (A Colonel in the U.S. army), points out that many well-meaning actions by the U.S. and ISAF had negative effects due to misunderstandings of Afghanistan’s complexities. Kem notes the book does not provide clear policy recommendations and covers events only through 2008, before the surge. Overall, he finds the volume well written and particularly relevant for military audiences.

=== Afghan Modern ===
A H-Soz-Kult review by Philipp Casula (University of Basel) praises Afghan Modern: The History of a Global Nation for challenging the common views of Afghanistan as isolated, old-fashioned, or defined by conflict. Casula states that Crews instead successfully tracks Afghanistan’s long history of “globalism,” which is marked by high mobility, especially among its diaspora, and deep “hyperconnectivity.” Crews works backward from the present, highlighting changing global connections starting in the fifteenth century with “imperial cosmopolitans.” Casula documents how Crews covers state-led modernization, “progressive religiosity,” integration into global finance and nation-building in the 1930s, and Cold War ties, including tourism and 1968 trends. He also addresses the local push behind the late-1970s revolution and Afghanistan's reintegration into global networks after 2001. Casula finds the book very readable and packed with sources. He mentions two caveats: the distinction between “modernity” and “globalism” sometimes becomes unclear, the book could have been titled “Afghan Global”, and that global connectivity often focuses on specific locations or groups. Overall, Casula states the study effectively redefines Afghanistan as a historically interconnected space, where thinkers have continually promoted universal ideas, linking the country to the West's "own modern condition.”

Writing in the American Historical Review, Barnett Rubin finds Afghan Modern deeply researched and readable, but argues its headline claim, namely to overturn entrenched clichés of Afghanistan’s isolation and exceptionalism, is overstated and insufficiently engaged with earlier scholarship (notably Olivier Roy and his own work) that had already framed Afghanistan as globally entangled. He also faults Crews for thin evidence of the alleged ubiquity of those clichés and for dismissing “foreign commentators”. While praising the multilingual archival breadth, the critique highlights limits: an elite‑centric narrative that underplays how non‑elites interacted with global forces (e.g., poppy economies, Western languages), a sympathetic treatment of the People's Democratic Party of Afghanistan without explaining its pre‑CIA failure, some factual errors in later sections, and a critique of counterinsurgency (COIN) that misses how COIN can generate illusions of success. The reviewer welcomes the account of the Helmand Valley fiascoes but urges an update (e.g., Kajaki Dam’s unfinished status), and deems the post‑2001 analysis of rising Shi‘i currents valuable while seeing a gap on Sunni/Deobandi developments central to the Taliban.

In an International Affairs review, John Birch of the Royal College of Defense Studies finds the book to be a convincing response to the clichés about the “Hermit Kingdom.” Birch praises its broad narrative and its argument that Afghanistan has been connected to the world for a long time. However, he points out some significant issues. Per Birch there is excessive focus on Western tourists from the 1970s and not enough attention to the everyday concerns of ordinary Afghans, such as water and faith. He also notes the near omission of King Zahir Shah, despite his forty-year reign. While Crews calls for “new approaches,” he does not provide specific solutions. Nevertheless, Birch concludes by describing it as a “fine book” that accurately positions Afghanistan in its rightful, albeit troubled, place in global affairs.
