= Jonathan Mark Kenoyer =

American archaeologist known for his work on Indus Valley Civilization (born 1952)

Jonathan Mark Kenoyer (born 28 May 1952, in Shillong, India) is an American archaeologist and George F. Dales Jr. & Barbara A. Dales Professor of Anthropology at the University of Wisconsin–Madison. He earned his Bachelor of Arts, Master's, and Doctorate degrees at the University of California, Berkeley, finishing in 1983. Kenoyer is president of the Society of Bead Researchers.

Being focused on the Indus Valley Civilization, Kenoyer is involved in ongoing research on the Indus Civilization in the Indian Subcontinent as well as in adjacent regions such as Oman and Afghanistan. He has also expanded his areas of study into East and Southeast Asia to better understand the long-distance trade linking these regions to the Subcontinent. He was elected to the American Academy of Arts and Sciences in 2011 and is a member of the American Anthropological Association, as well as many other professional associations. He has been involved in numerous institutions that link US academics to regions of South Asia, such as the Council for American Overseas Research Centers, the American Institute of Indian Studies, the American Institute of Bangladesh Studies, the American Institute of Afghanistan Studies and the American Institute of Pakistan Studies. He is a fluent speaker of Urdu, Hindi, and Bengali.

== Publications ==
=== Books and edited volumes ===
- 2005: The Ancient South Asian World. By Jonathan Mark Kenoyer and Kimberly Heuston. Oxford University Press, New York.
- 1998: Ancient Cities of the Indus Valley Civilization. Oxford University Press and American Institute of Pakistan Studies, Karachi.
- 1998: Sarang and Jeevai: A coloring book story of the ancient Indus Valley. Oxford University Press, Karachi.
- 1994: From Sumer to Meluhha: Contributions to the Archaeology of South and West Asia in Memory of George F. Dales, Jr. Wisconsin Archaeology Reports, Volume 3. Department of Anthropology, University of Wisconsin at Madison.
- 1989: Old Problems and New Perspectives in the Archaeology of South Asia. Wisconsin Archaeology Reports, Volume 2. Department of Anthropology, University of Wisconsin at Madison.
- 1986: Excavations at Mohenjo-daro, Pakistan: The Pottery. By George F. Dales and Jonathan Mark Kenoyer, University Museum Monograph 53. University Museum, University of Philadelphia.
- 1983: Shell Working Industries of the Indus Civilization: An archaeological and ethnographic perspective. PhD dissertation at University of California-Berkeley.

=== Articles ===
- 2017: "Textiles and Trade in South Asia during the Proto-historic and Early Historic Period." In Silk: Trade and Exchange along the Silk Roads between Rome and China in Antiquity edited by Berit Hildebrandt. Oxbow Books, Oxford, Ancient Textiles Series (Vol. 29), ISBN 9781785702792.
- 2015: "New perspectives on Stone Bead Technology at Bronze Age Troy." Ludvik, G., J. M. Kenoyer, M. Pieniążek and W. Aylward. Anatolian Studies Journal 65 (2015): 1–18.
- 2015: "The Archaeological Heritage of Pakistan: The Indo-Gangetic Tradition: Early Historic Chiefdoms and States of the Northern Subcontinent." In History of Pakistan, edited by Roger Long, pp. 91–134. Oxford University Press: Karachi.
- 2015: "The Archaeological Heritage of Pakistan: From the Palaeolithic to the Indus Civilization." In History of Pakistan, edited by Roger Long, pp. 1–90. Oxford University Press: Karachi.
- 2014: "New Perspectives on the Indus Tradition: Contributions from recent research at Harappa and other sites in Pakistan and India", in Sindhu-Sarasvati Valley Civilization: New Perspectives: a Volume in Memory of Dr. Shikaripur Ranganatha Rao, edited by Nalini Rao, pp. 500–535. DK and Nalanda International.
- 2014: "The Indus Civilization." In The Cambridge Prehistory, edited by Colin Renfrew and Paul Bahn, pp. 407–432. Cambridge University Press: Cambridge.
- 2014: "Eye Beads from the Indus Tradition: Technology, Style and Chronology." Journal of Asian Civilizations 2013 Vol. 36(2):1-23
- 2013: "Iconography of the Indus Unicorn: Origins and Legacy." In Connections and Complexity: New Approaches to the Archaeology of South Asia, edited by S. Abraham, P. Gullapalli, T. Raczek, and U. Rizvi, pp. 107–125. Left Coast Press, Walnut Creek.
- 2013: "Connections between the Indus Valley and Mesopotamia: Preliminary Results of Strontium Isotope analyses from Harappa and Ur." J. M. Kenoyer, T. D. Price and J. Burton. Journal of Archaeological Science, Vol. 40: 2286–2297.
- 2012: "Stone Drill Bits from Dholavira – A Multi-faceted Analysis." Puratattva, 37, 8-25. Prabhakar, V. N., Bisht, R. S., Law, R. W. and J. M. Kenoyer
- 2011: "Changing Perspectives of the Indus Civilization: New Discoveries and Challenges." Puratattva Vol. 41:1-18.
- 2011: "A Reply to Ji-Huan He", by Irene Good, J. M. Kenoyer and R. H. Meadow. Archaeometry Vol. 53(6):1257-1258. (online version 4 April 2011).
- 2010: "Gandharan Cultural Traditions: Context, Chronology and Legacies of the Indus Civilization." In Ancient Punjab, Vol. 1:.
- 2009: "Indus Seals: An overview of Iconography and Style." Ancient Sindh 9 (2006–2007): 7-30.
- 2009: "What Happened to the Harappans?" ABC-CLIO online Social Studies Database, (http://www.ancienthistory.abc-clio.com)
- 2009: "New Evidence for Early Silk in the Indus Civilization." By Irene Good, J. M. Kenoyer and R. H. Meadow. Archaeometry 51(3):457-466.
- 2008: "Collaborative Archaeological Research in Pakistan and India: Patterns and Processes." The SAA Archaeological Record, 8(3):12-20.
- 2008: "What is it, Reading the Clues, What's New, Face to Face with History." In Ingenuity along the Indus: Birth of a civilization, edited by Rosalie F. Baker and Charles F. Baker. Calliope 18(5).
- 2005: "Steatite and faience manufacturing at Harappa: New evidence from Mound E excavations 2000–2001." Museum Journal. III-IV (Jan - Dec 2002): 43–56.
- 2005: "Uncovering the keys to the Lost Indus Cities." Scientific American. 15(1): 24–33.
- 2004: "Chronology and interrelations between Harappa and Central Asia." Journal of the Japanese Society for West Asian Archaeology. 5: 38–45.
- 2003: "Uncovering the keys to the lost Indus Cities." Scientific American. July: 67–75.
- 2001: "Early developments of art, symbol and technology in the Indus Valley Tradition." INDO-KOKO-KENKYU. 22: 1–18.
- 2001: "Recent discoveries and highlights from excavations at Harappa: 1998–2000." by R. H. Meadow and J. M. Kenoyer. INDO-KOKO-KENKYU. 22: 19–36.
- 2000: "The Indus Valley mystery." by R. H. Meadow and J. M. Kenoyer. Discovering Archaeology, April 2000, pp. 38–43.
- 1999: "Harappa in 3D: A powerful new tool rebuilds the past in the Indus Valley." Discovering Archaeology. March/April: 89–93. By Wayne R. Belcher, A. Keith Turner and J. Mark Kenoyer.
- 1998: "Seals and Sculpture of the Indus Cities." Minerva 9(2): 19–24.
- 1998: "Craft Traditions of the Indus Civilization and their Legacy in Modern Pakistan." Lahore Museum Bulletin. Vol. IX(2) 1996:1-8.
- 1997: "Trade and Technology of the Indus Valley: new insights from Harappa, Pakistan." World Archaeology 29(2):262-280.
- 1997: "New Inscribed Objects From Harappa." J. M. Kenoyer and R. H. Meadow. Lahore Museum Bulletin Vol. IX(1) 1996:1-20.
- 1996: "Antique bead and ornament replicas from South Asia: An alternative to antique bead collecting and the destruction of global cultural heritage." Ornament. 20(2): 68–71.
- 1996: "The Ancient City of Harappa. Asian Art and Culture." A. M. Sackler Gallery, Smithsonian Institution, Spring 1996: pp. 85–99.
- 1995: "Ideology and Legitimation in the Indus State as revealed through Public and Private Symbols." The Archaeological Review, 4(1&2): 87–131.
- 1994: "Harappan Technology: Methodological and Theoretical Issues." Bhan, K. K., M. Vidale and J. M. Kenoyer. Man and Environment 19(1–2): 141–157.
- 1994: "Faience Ornaments of Harappa and the Indus Civilization." Ornament 17(3):35-39,95.
- 1992: "La civiltà della Valle dell¹Indo." M. Vidale and J. M. Kenoyer. ARCHEO., Anno VII, 9(91) September : 54–99. Rome, Italy
- 1992: "Stratigraphic complexities and recording of archaeological sites: Models from recent excavations at Harappa." Journal of Pakistan Archaeologists Forum. 1(1):1-24.
- 1992: "A new look at stone drills of the Indus Valley Tradition" by J. M. Kenoyer and M. Vidale. In Materials Issues in Art and Archaeology, III, Vol. 267. Edited by P. Vandiver, J. R. Druzick, G. S. Wheeler and I. Freestone. Materials Research Society, Pittsburgh, pp. 495–519.
- 1992: "Lapis lazuli bead making in Afghanistan and Pakistan." Ornament, 15(3): 71–73.
- 1992: "Ornament Styles of the Indus Valley Tradition: Evidence from recent excavations at Harappa, Pakistan." Paléorient. 17(2) - 1991: 79–98.
- 1991: "The Indus Valley Tradition of Pakistan and Western India." Journal of World Prehistory 5(4): 331–385.
- 1991: "Contemporary stone beadmaking in Khambhat, India: patterns of craft specialization and organization of production as reflected in the archaeological record." World Archaeology. 23(1): 44–63. By J. M. Kenoyer, M. Vidale and K. K. Bhan.
- 1991: "Harappan craft specialization and the question of urban segregation and stratification." Eastern Anthropologist. 44(3–4).
- 1990: "Harappa Excavations 1988." By G.F. Dales and J. M. Kenoyer. Pakistan Archaeology 24: 68–176
- 1988: "Traditional Indian Potters at the Smithsonian." Expedition Vol. 29(3): 55–63, by Marilyn P. Beaudry, J. M. Kenoyer and Rita P. Wright.
- 1988: "Recent Developments in the Study of the Indus Civilization." The Eastern Anthropologist, Vol. 41(1): 65–76.
- 1987: "The Indus Civilization: Unfathomed Depths of South Asian Culture." Wisconsin Academy Review Vol. 33(2):22-26.
- 1986: "The Indus Bead Industry and Its Contribution to Bead Technology." Ornament, 10(1):18-23.
- 1984: "Nageshwar, A Mature Harappan Shell Working Site on the Gulf of Kutch, Gujarat." Oriental Institute. M.S.U. Baroda Vol. 33(3–4):67-80, by Kuldeep K. Bhan and J. M. Kenoyer.
- 1984: "Shell Working Industries of the Indus Civilization; A Summary." Paléorient 10(1):49-63.
- 1983: "An Upper Palaeolithic Shrine in India?" Antiquity Vol. LVII:88-94. by J. M. Kenoyer, J. D. Clark, J. N. Pal and G. R. Sharma.
- 1983: "Nageshwar: An Industrial Centre of the Chalcolithic Period." Puratattva, No. 12, 1980-81:115-120 by Kuldeep K. Bhan and J. M. Kenoyer.
- 1977: "Shell working at ancient Balakot, Pakistan. Expedition." 19(2): 13–19. by G. F. Dales and J. M. Kenoyer

=== Lectures ===
- 2020: The Indus Script Demystified: Origin, Character and Disappearance. Online, Dec 4, 2020.
