= Laurie Burgess =

American archaeologist

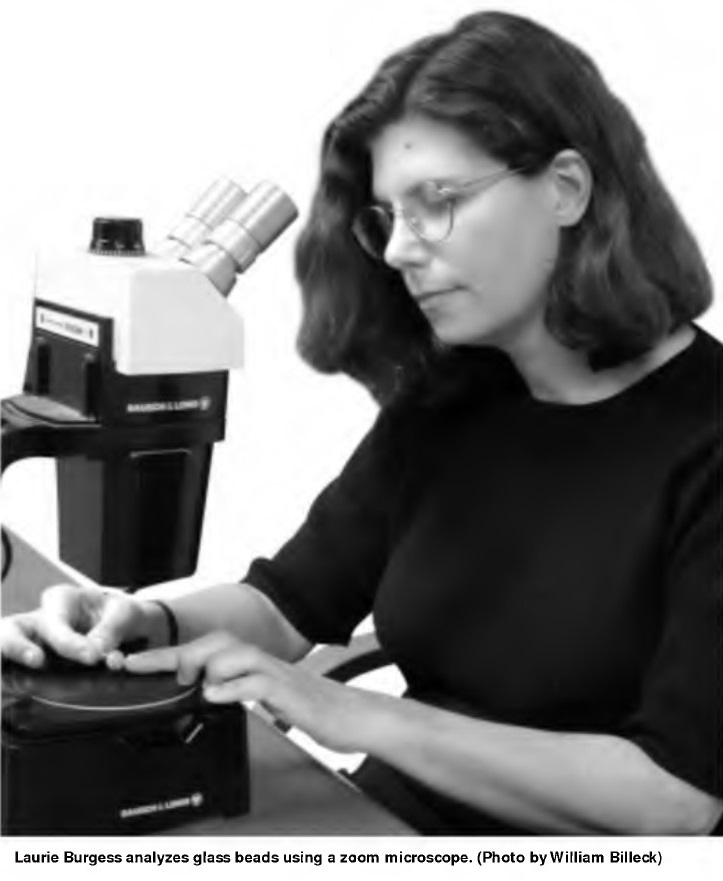
- Laurie Burgess analyses glass beads using a zoom microscope.
- Occupation: Historical archaeologist
- Known for: Study of glass beads, coffin hardware, repatriation

Academic background
- Education: Pennsylvania State University (Bachelor of Arts); University of Maryland (Master of Science)

Academic work
- Discipline: Historical archaeology
- Institutions: Smithsonian Institution

Laurie E. Burgess is an American museum professional, archaeologist, and repatriation expert specializing in glass trade beads and coffin hardware. She was the Co-Chair of the Department of Anthropology and developed an international repatriation program within the Smithsonian Institution’s National Museum of Natural History.

== Education ==
Burgess was educated at the University of Maryland, where she received a MS in Anthropology, and at Pennsylvania State University, where she received a BA in English in 1985; in 2022, she was awarded an Outstanding Scholar Alumni Mentor Award for her impact on young scholars.

== Research ==
Her research focuses on historic North American material culture, and in particular historic mortuary practices, coffin hardware, and glass trade beads as used for dating burials, human remains, and museum collections in anthropology. With Harold Mytum, she edited a scholarly monograph on mortuary culture as found in the study of coffins and burial vaults.

== Work ==
While Co-Chair of the Department of Anthropology at the National Museum of Natural History, Burgess led a program for international repatriation of human remains. She represented the museum on international repatriation and human remains issues featured in Pulitzer-nominated journalistic coverage. Burgess served as an expert archaeologist, alongside noted forensic anthropologist Doug Owsley, on preservation efforts at the United States’ Congressional Cemetery on Capitol Hill, when remains were excavated from and then returned to 19th-century burial vaults slated for restoration. For this project, Burgess “worked through layers of casket debris, bones, dirt and twigs to date and identify Washington’s early residents. Burgess dates the remains via coffin styles and ornamentation, as well as materials such as buttons and pins from clothing that has long since turned to dust."

== Service ==
Burgess served as president of the Council for Maryland Archaeology, on an national advisory board for the development of the research data management tool DMPTool, and has held multiple leadership roles in the Society of Bead Researchers.

== Selected works ==
Works contributing to mortuary anthropology and bead research include:

- Mytum, Harold C. and Burgess, Laurie E., editors. 2018. "Death Across Oceans: Archaeology of Coffins and Vaults in Britain, America, and Australia". Washington, D.C.: Smithsonian Institution Scholarly Press
- Burgess, Laurie E. and Owsley, Douglas. 2018. "Death, Dogs, and Monuments: Recent Research at Washington’s Congressional Cemetery." In Death Across Oceans: Archaeology of Coffins and Vaults in Britain, America, and Australia. Mytum, Harold C. and Burgess, Laurie E., editors. 249–262. Washington, D.C.: Smithsonian Institution Scholarly Press. In Smithsonian Contributions to Knowledge.
- Owsley, Douglas W., Bruwelheide, Karin S., Burgess, Laurie E., and Billeck, William T. 2007. "Human Finger and Hand Bone Necklaces from the Plains and Great Basin." In The Taking and Displaying of Human Body Parts as Trophies by Amerindians. Chacon, Richard J. and Dye, David H., editors. 124–166. New York: Springer.
- Burgess, Laurie E., and Laure Dussubieux. "Chemical composition of late 18th-and 19th-century glass beads from western North America: clues to sourcing beads." BEADS: Journal of the Society of Bead Researchers 19.1 (2007): 58-73.
