= Edwin Rich =

Edwin Rich may refer to:

- Edwin Rich (1561–1600), son of the 2nd Baron Rich, knighted on an expedition to Cadiz in 1596
- Edwin Rich (politician) (c. 1594–1675), English lawyer and MP, his son
- Edwin Rich (historian) (1904–1979), Vere Harmsworth Professor of Imperial and Naval History and Master of St Catharine's College, Cambridge
