= John F. Richards =

American historian (1938–2007)

- Born: November 3, 1938; Exeter, New Hampshire, U.S.
- Died: August 23, 2007 (aged 68); Durham, North Carolina, U.S.
- Education: University of New Hampshire; University of California, Berkeley (PhD)
- Occupation: Historian
- Spouse: Ann Berry (m. 1961)
- Children: 2

John F. Richards (November 3, 1938 – August 23, 2007) was a historian of South Asia and in particular of the Mughal Empire. He was professor of history at Duke University in North Carolina, and a recipient in 2007 of the Distinguished Contributions to Asian Studies Award. He participated in and encouraged a multi-disciplinary, multi-regional approach to studies.

== Life ==
John Richards was born on November 3, 1938, in Exeter, New Hampshire. His parents, Frank F. Richards and Ella Higgins Richards, subsequently had two more children.

Richards graduated from the University of New Hampshire as valedictorian in 1961 and on the same day he married his high school sweetheart, Ann Berry. The couple moved to California and, in 1968, to Madison when he received an appointment at the University of Wisconsin. He was awarded a PhD in history by the University of California, Berkeley, in 1970. His thesis, later published at Mughal Administration in Golconda (1975), was written under the direction of Thomas R. Metcalf. This established him as "one of the leading historians of the Mughal Empire in the United States", according to David Gilmartin, and he went on to write a volume of The New Cambridge History of India titled The Mughal Empire (1993).

Other works by Richards on the Mughal period include The Imperial Monetary System of Mughal India (1987) and Kingship and Authority in South Asia (1998). The impact of the Mughal empire on world events caused him to consider the Mughals to be an "early modern" empire, rather than the medieval one that most commentators believed it to be. It was this belief that led him into studies of world trade and state finances, as well as early modern world environmental history. In 2003, he published The Unending Frontier: Environmental History of the Early Modern World (2003).

Richards had worked at Duke University since 1977. He was heavily involved with administration of the Council of American Overseas Research Centers and in reforming the troubled American Institute of Pakistan Studies. He was also in the vanguard of establishing the American Institute of Afghanistan Studies, the first meeting of which took place at Duke University in 2003 and of which he was the founding president.

Richards died of cancer at home in Durham, North Carolina, on August 23, 2007, days before he was due to retire. He had two children.

A festschrift titled Expanding Frontiers in South Asian and World History: Essays in Honour of John F. Richards was published in 2013, edited by Richard M. Eaton, Munis D. Faruqui, Gilmartin and Sunil Kumar.

In 2011, the American Historical Association inaugurated a prize named in his honor. This is awarded for the best book on South Asian history published during each year.
