= The Cambridge History of the First World War =

Cambridge University Press publication

- Genre: non-fiction, war history, European history
- Publisher: Cambridge University
- Publication place: England

The Cambridge History of the First World War is a three-volume work, published in 2013 and 2014 by Cambridge University Press, that covers different aspects of the First World War.

== See all ==
- The Cambridge History of the British Empire
