= Alison Bashford =

Australian historian

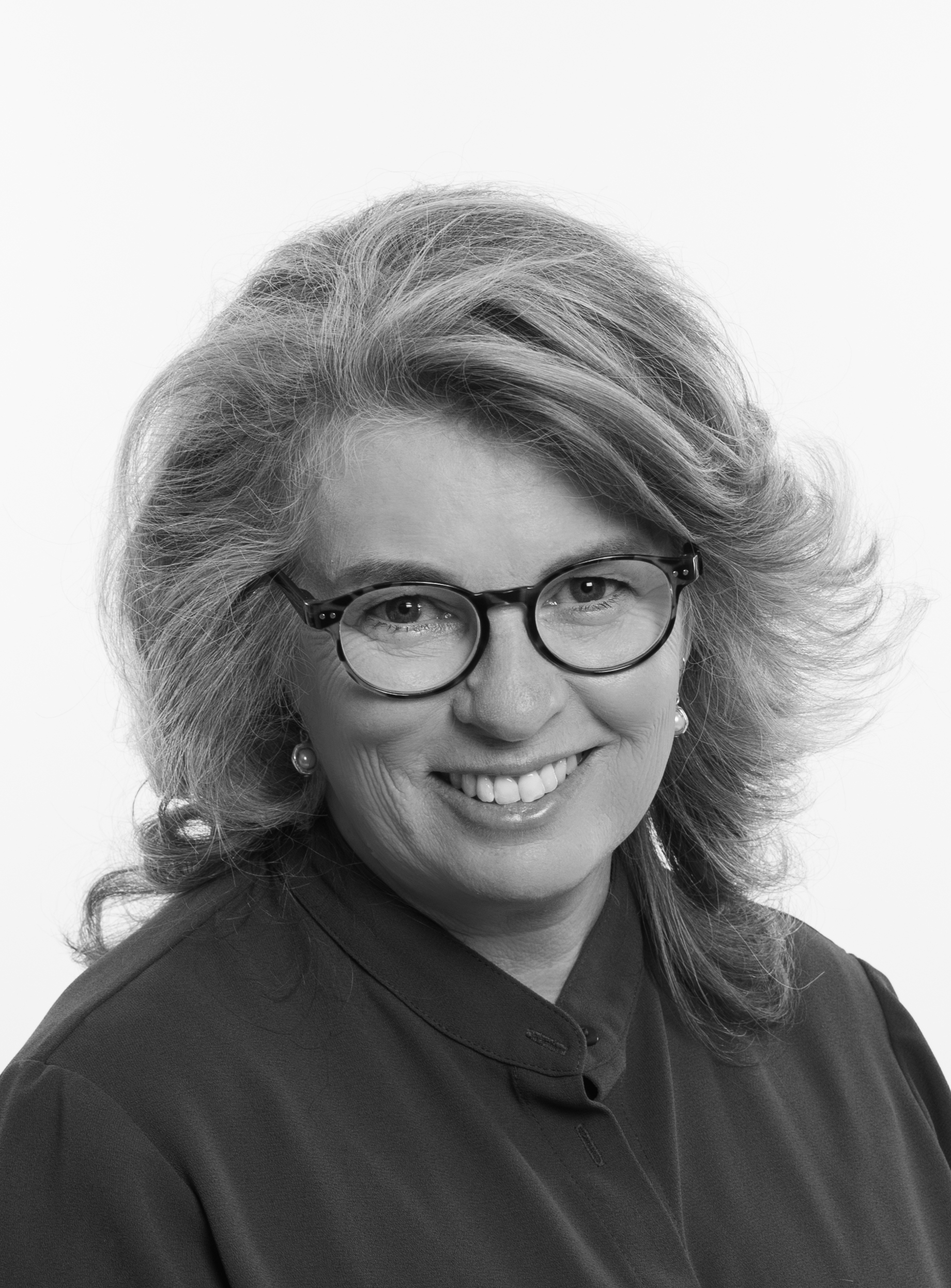
- Bashford in 2021
- Born: 1963 (age 62–63); Sydney, New South Wales
- Awards: Fellow of the Australian Academy of the Humanities (2010); Fellow of the British Academy (2017)

Academic background
- Education: University of Sydney (BA [Hons], PhD)

Academic work
- Discipline: History
- Sub-discipline: Global history History of science Environmental history
- Institutions: University of New South Wales (2017–); University of Cambridge (2013–17); University of Sydney (1996–2012)

Alison Caroline Bashford, FAHA, FBA (born 1963) is a historian specialising in global history and the history of science. She is Laureate Professor of History at the University of New South Wales and Director of the Laureate Centre for History & Population. Alison Bashford was previously Vere Harmsworth Professor of Imperial and Naval History at the University of Cambridge (2013–2017).

== Academic career ==
From 1996 to 2009, Bashford was a lecturer in history at the University of Sydney. She was appointed Professor of Modern History in 2009. Between 2009 and 2010, Bashford held the Chair of Australian Studies at Harvard University. Moving to England, she was Vere Harmsworth Professor of Imperial and Naval History at the University of Cambridge and a Fellow of Jesus College, Cambridge from 2013 to 2017. Since 2017, she has been Research Professor of History at the University of New South Wales and Director of the New Earth Histories Research Program.

Bashford has also held visiting positions at Warwick University and University College, London.

Bashford has published seven books, including An Intimate History of Evolution: The Story of the Huxley Family (Allen Lane, 2022) Purity and Pollution: Gender, Embodiment and Victorian Medicine (1998), Imperial Hygiene: A Critical History of Colonialism, Nationalism, and Public Health (2003), Global Population: History, Geopolitics and Life on Earth (2014) and The New Worlds of Thomas Robert Malthus: Re-reading the Principle of Population (2016), and has edited seven, including Medicine at the Border: Disease, Globalization and Security, 1850 to the Present (2006), the Oxford Handbook of the History of Eugenics (2010), and Pacific Histories: Ocean, Land, People (2014). Her current work focuses on cosmopolitan histories of modern earth sciences.

== Honours and recognition ==
In 2010, Bashford was elected a Fellow of the Australian Academy of the Humanities. In July 2017, she was elected a Fellow of the British Academy, the United Kingdom's national academy for the humanities and social sciences. She is also a Fellow of the Royal Society of New South Wales.

In 2021 she was awarded the Dan David Prize. An open letter signed by academics and researchers called on Bashford to reconsider her acceptance of the prize. She won the 2023 Nib Literary Award and was shortlisted for the 2023 Cundill History Prize for The Huxleys. Her 2025 book, Decoding the Hand, was shortlisted for both the Pickstone Prize (British Society for the History of Science) and the General History Prize (NSW History Awards) in 2026.

== Selected works ==
Besides a number of book chapters and peer-reviewed journal articles, Bashford has written or edited the following books:

=== Books written ===
- Purity and Pollution: Gender, Embodiment and Victorian Medicine (Macmillan, 1998). ISBN 9780333682487
- Imperial Hygiene: A Critical History of Colonialism, Nationalism and Public Health (Palgrave Macmillan, 2004). ISBN 9781403904881
- Griffith Taylor: Visionary, Environmentalist, Explorer (University of Toronto Press/National Library of Australia Press, 2008). Co-authored with Carolyn Strange. ISBN 9780802096630
- Global Population: History, Geopolitics, and Life on Earth (Columbia University Press, 2014). ASIN B00I2G6UXA
- The New Worlds of Thomas Robert Malthus: Re-reading the Principle of Population (Princeton University Press, 2016). Co-authored with Joyce E. Chaplin. ISBN 9780691164199
- An Intimate History of Evolution: The Story of the Huxley Family, (Allen Lane, 2022). The Huxleys: An Intimate History of Evolution, (University of Chicago Press, 2022). ISBN 9780226720111
- Decoding the Hand: A History of Science, Medicine, and Magic, (University of Chicago Press, 2025). ISBN 9780226831152

=== Books edited ===
- Contagion: Historical and Cultural Studies (Routledge, 2001). Co-edited with Claire Hooker. New edition: Contagion: Epidemics, history and culture from smallpox to anthrax (Pluto Press, 2003). ISBN 9780415246712
- Isolation: Places and Practices of Exclusion (Routledge, 2003). Co-edited with Carolyn Strange. ISBN 9780415309806
- Medicine at the Border: Disease, Globalization and Security from 1850 to the Present (Palgrave Macmillan, 2006). ISBN 9781137444660
- The Oxford Handbook of the History of Eugenics (Oxford University Press, 2010). Co-edited with Philippa Levine. ISBN 9780199945054
- The Cambridge History of Australia, 2 vols (Cambridge University Press, 2013). Co-edited with Stuart Macintyre. ISBN 9781107447516
- Pacific Histories: Ocean, Land, People (Palgrave Macmillan, 2014). Co-edited with David Armitage. ISBN 9781137001634
- Oceanic Histories (Cambridge University Press, 2018), with David Armitage and Sujit Sivasundaram. ISBN 9781108434829
