= Elphinstone High School =

English school in Bombay, India

Coordinates: 18.9271413°N 72.8284738°E

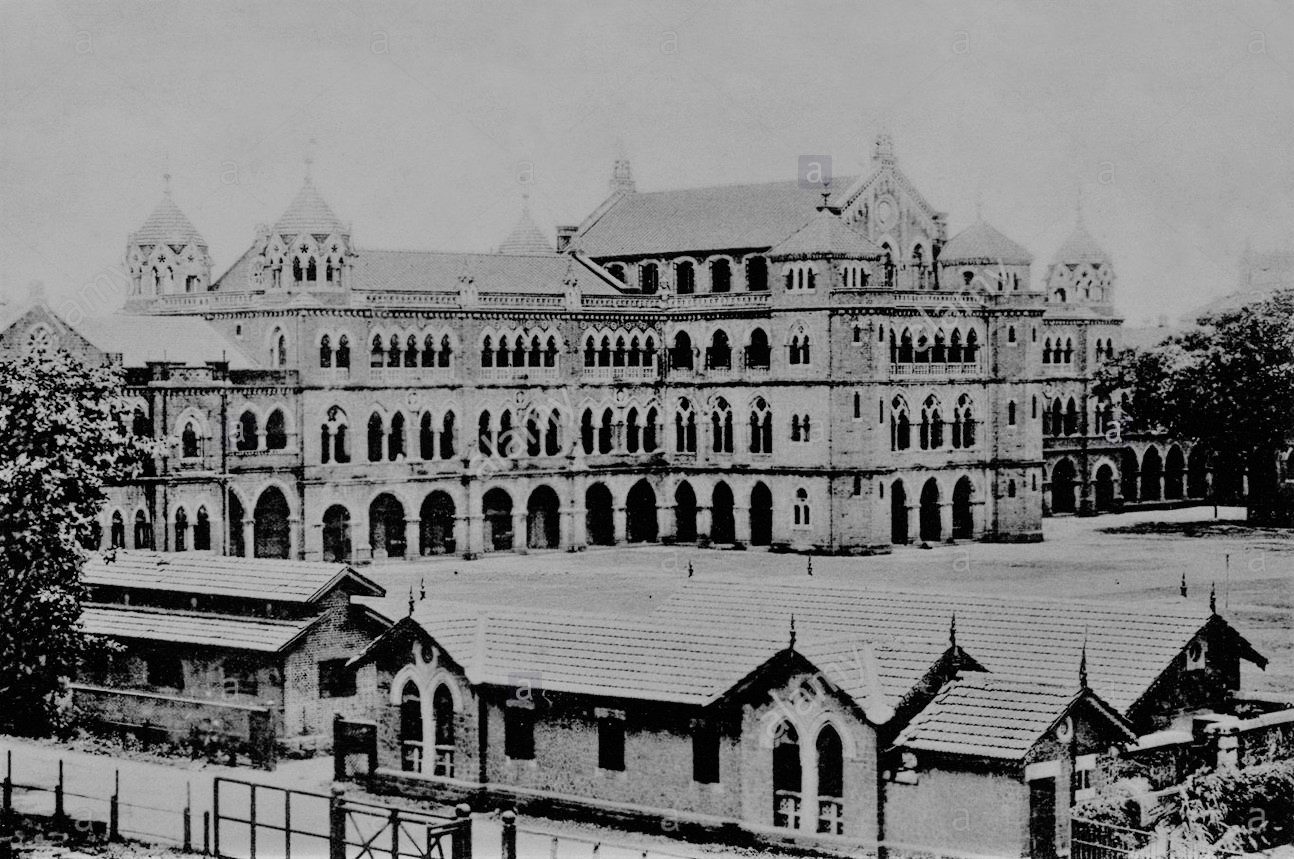
A photo of Elphinstone High School

Elphinstone High School was an English-medium school established in 1824 in Bombay, India in honour of Mountstuart Elphinstone, the then Governor of Bombay (1819–1827). In 1836 the Elphinstone Institute was founded, which started the Elphinstone College.

Shah Mahmoud Hanifi, in his book Mountstuart Elphinstone in South Asia: Pioneer of British Colonial Rule mentions that the relationship between Elphinstone High School and the Elphinstone College was unclear until 1856, when both were formally separated.

Economist and politician B. R. Ambedkar attended Elphinstone High School from 1904 to 1907, becoming the first person from the Dalit caste in India to attain this achievement. The author P.C. Wren was principal of the school from 1915 to 1917.
