= The Cambridge Shorter History of India =

1934 book edited by H. H. Dodwell

The Cambridge Shorter History of India is a 1934 book on Indian history edited by H. H. Dodwell and published by the Cambridge University Press.

== Description ==
This work is based on published volumes of The Cambridge History of India but claims to be "far from a mere resumé of the larger work". The book is divided into three sections: Ancient India (by John Allan), Moslem India (by T. Wolseley Haig), and British India (by Dodwell). The book has been criticised for devoting almost half its volume to sixty years of British rule (until the Government of India Act 1919); although the first half of the book was also considered too technical and "almost unreadable." According to a review by Franklin Edgerton, "serious scholars will hardly find the book useful, for lack of reference to source materials. And for the present reviewer, at least, it is difficult to believe that many laymen will find it interesting."

The 1958 reprint by S. Chand & Co. contains additional chapters by R. R. Sethi on "The Last Phase (1919–1947)".
