= The New Cambridge History of India =

Multi-volume work of historical scholarship

The New Cambridge History of India is a major multi-volume work of historical scholarship published by Cambridge University Press. It replaced The Cambridge History of India published between 1922 and 1937.

The new history is being published as a series of individual works by single authors and, unlike the original, does not form a connected narrative. Also unlike the original, it only covers the period since the fourteenth century. The whole has been planned over four parts:

- Pt. I The Mughals and their Contemporaries.
- Pt. II Indian States and the Transition to Colonialism.
- Pt. III The Indian Empire and the beginnings of Modern Society.
- Pt. IV The Evolution of Contemporary South Asia.

== Titles ==
=== The Mughals and their Contemporaries ===
- Pearson, M. N. (1987). The Portuguese in India. p. 198.
- Stein, Burton (1989). Vijayanagara. p. 167.
- Beach, Milo Cleveland (1992). Mughal and Rajput Painting. p. 336.
- Asher, Catherine B. (1992). Architecture of Mughal India. p. 386.
- Richards, John F. (1995). The Mughal Empire. p. 337.
- Michell, George (1995). Architecture and Art of Southern India: Vijayanagara and the Successor States 1350–1750. p. 316.
- Michell, George; Zebrowski, Mark (1999). Architecture and Art of the Deccan Sultanate. p. 328.
- Eaton, Richard M. (2005). A Social History of the Deccan, 1300–1761 Eight Indian Lives. p. 236.

=== Indian States and the Transition to Colonialism ===
- Bayly, Christopher Alan (1988). Indian society and the making of the British Empire. p. 225.
- Marshall, P. J. (1987). Bengal: The British Bridgehead. Eastern India 1740–1828. p. 204.
- Grewal, J. S. (1990). The Sikhs of the Punjab. p. 293.
- Gordon, Stewart (1993). The Marathas 1600–1818. p. 211.
- Prakash, Om (1998). European commercial enterprise in pre-colonial India. p. 383.

=== The Indian Empire and the Beginnings of Modern Society ===
- Jones, Kenneth W. (1989). Socio-religious reform movements in British India. p. 246.
- Bose, Sugata (1993). Peasant Labour and Colonial Capital: Rural Bengal since 1770. p. 212.
- Tomlinson, B. R. (1993). The Economy of Modern India, 1860–1970. p. 249.
  - Second edition: Tomlinson, B. R. (2013). The Economy of Modern India: From 1860 to the Twenty-First Century.
- Metcalf, Thomas R. (1995). Ideologies of the Raj. p. 252.
- Arnold, David (2000). Science, Technology and Medicine in Colonial India. p. 248.
- Ramusack, Barbara N. (2004). The Indian Princes and Their States. p. 299.

=== The Evolution of Contemporary South Asia ===
- Brass, Paul (1994). The Politics of India since Independence.
- Forbes, Geraldine (1996). Women in Modern India. p. 302.
- Bayly, Susan (1999). Caste, Society and Politics in India from the Eighteenth Century to the Modern Age. p. 426.
- Ludden, David (1999). An Agrarian History of South Asia. p. 261.

== See also ==
- Murty Classical Library of India
- The History of India, as Told by Its Own Historians
