= Shah Mahmoud Hanifi =

Shah Mahmoud Hanifi is a full Professor of History at James Madison University in Harrisonburg, Virginia. Hanifi received the degree of Bachelor of Arts from the University of Wisconsin–Madison. He subsequently attended the University of Michigan at Ann Arbor.

As a student of South Asian expert Juan Cole, Hanifi received his Ph.D. in history in 2002 following the completion of his thesis, Inter-regional Trade and Colonial State Formation in Nineteenth-century Afghanistan. He won the 2004 Gutenberg-e Prize from the American Historical Association for this doctoral thesis.

Hanifi is serving as the Principal Investigator and Project Director for The Afghan Diaspora Remittance Project, a project funded by the Asian Development Bank and the American Institute of Afghanistan Studies.

== Honors and accomplishments ==
- Rackham Graduate School Outstanding Dissertation Award
- The AHA's Gutenberg-e Prize 2004
- Treasurer of American Institute of Afghanistan Studies
- Principal Investigator and Project Director for The Afghan Diaspora Remittance Project for the Asian Development Bank.

== Works ==
- Connecting histories in Afghanistan: market relations and state formation on a colonial frontier. Palo Alto: Stanford University Press, 2011.
- Mountstuart Elphinstone in South Asia : pioneer of British colonial rule. London: Hurst & Company, 2019.
