= Ernest Alfred Benians =

British academic and historian

Ernest Alfred Benians (23 October 1880 – 13 February 1952) was a British academic and historian.

He was born in Goudhurst, Kent, and was educated at Bethany School, where his father was headmaster. He went to the University of Cambridge in 1899, where he was admitted to St John's College, and became President of the Nonconformist Union. After graduating, he became a Fellow of St John's in 1906, followed by a succession of teaching appointments within the university. He was Master of St John's 1933–1952 and Vice-Chancellor of the University of Cambridge 1939–1941. In 1947 he was elected an honorary fellow of Trinity College Dublin.

== Selected publications ==
- The Cambridge History of the British Empire. General editor.

== References and sources ==
Sources

- Janus Catalogue (biographical notes)

Academic offices
| Preceded by Robert Forsyth Scott | Master of St John's College, Cambridge; 1933–1952 | Succeeded by James Wordie |
