= David Armitage (historian) =

British historian (born 1965)

Professor David Armitage
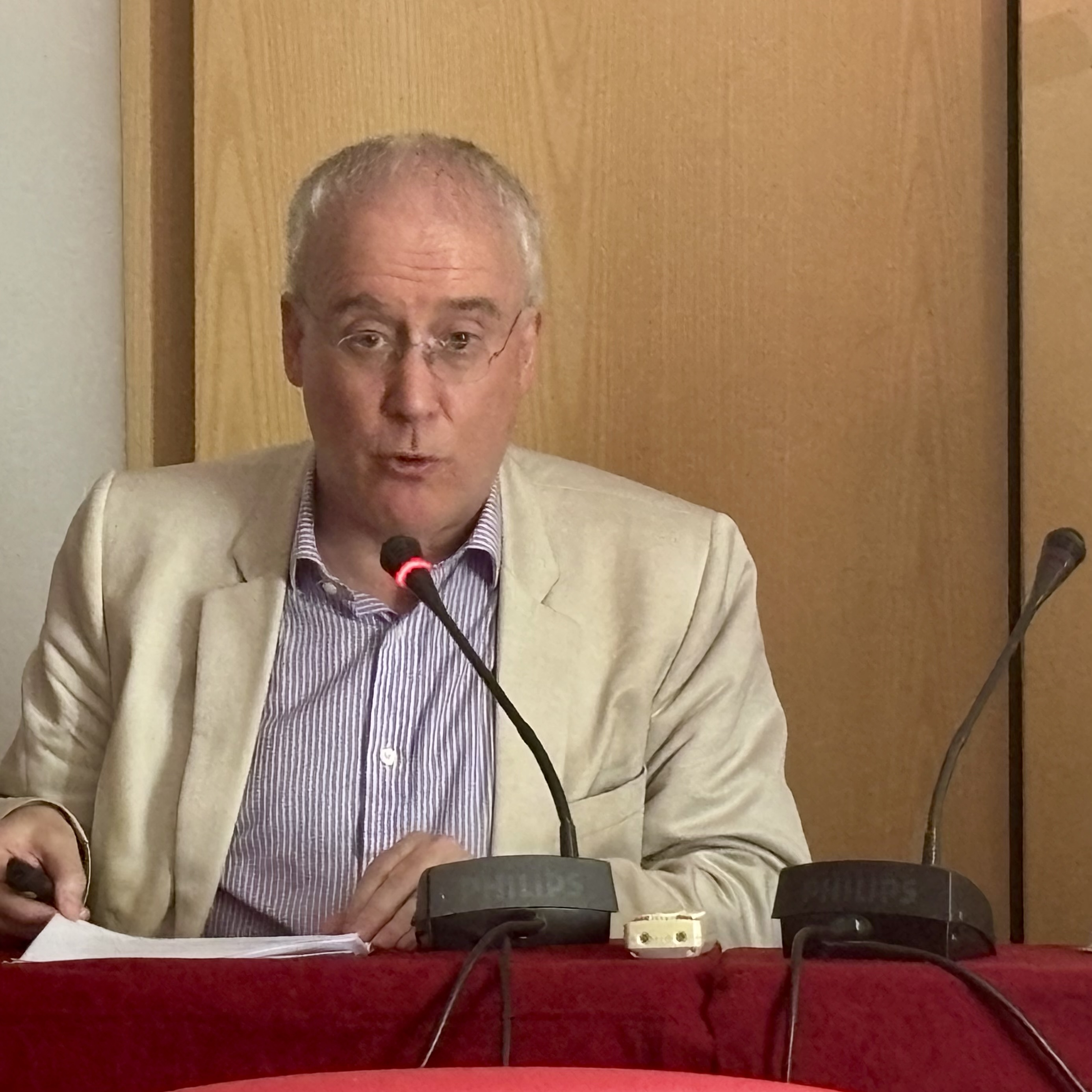
- Born: 1 February 1965 (age 61); Stockport, England
- Education: St Catharine's College, Cambridge (BA, PhD)
- Occupations: Historian and academic
- Employers: Emmanuel College, Cambridge; Columbia University; Harvard University

David Armitage (born 1 February 1965) is a British historian who has written on international and intellectual history. He has been chair of the history department and is Lloyd C. Blankfein Professor of History at Harvard University.

== Early life and education ==
Armitage was born in Stockport, England, on 1 February 1965, and attended Stockport Grammar School before attending St Catharine's College, Cambridge, where he read English as an undergraduate. After receiving his Bachelor of Arts, he embarked on a PhD in English, initially intending to write his doctoral dissertation on Shakespeare's classical sources and the English neoclassical poets.

During the course of his research, he became interested in the relationship between republicanism and empire in the works of John Milton and was increasingly attracted to the discipline of intellectual history. Funded by a Harkness Fellowship, he took two years off from his PhD to retrain as a historian at the Institute for Advanced Study in Princeton, New Jersey. He was awarded his doctorate in history from the University Cambridge in 1992. His dissertation, The British empire and the civic tradition, 1656–1742, was a study of the relationship between English literature and Britain's imperial ventures in the Americas.

== Career ==
After completing his PhD at the University of Cambridge, Armitage remained at the university until 1993, where he was a junior research fellow at Emmanuel College. He then joined the history faculty at Columbia University. He was awarded a fellowship from Harvard University, which he completed in 2000 and 2001. In 2004, he joined the Harvard University faculty, and later became the Lloyd C. Blankfein Professor of History and Chair of the Department of History.

In 2008, Harvard University named Armitage a Walter Channing Cabot Fellow for "achievements and scholarly eminence in the fields of literature, history or art". He is a Fellow of the Royal Society of Edinburgh, the Royal Historical Society and the Australian Academy of the Humanities.

== Books ==
- The Ideological Origins of the British Empire (Cambridge University Press, 2000)
- Greater Britain, 1516–1776: Essays in Atlantic History (Ashgate, 2004)
- The Declaration of Independence: A Global History (Harvard University Press, 2007)
- Foundations of Modern International Thought (Cambridge University Press, 2012)
- The History Manifesto (with Jo Guldi, Cambridge University Press, 2014)
- Civil Wars: A History in Ideas (Penguin Random House, 2017)

=== Edited volumes ===
- Milton and Republicanism (with Armand Himy and Quentin Skinner, Cambridge University Press, 1995)
- Bolingbroke: Political Writings (Cambridge University Press, 1997)
- Theories of Empire, 1450–1800 (Ashgate, 1998)
- The British Atlantic World, 1500–1800 (with Michael Braddick, Palgrave Macmillan, 2002)
- British Political Thought in History, Literature and Theory, 1500–1800 (Cambridge University Press, 2006)
- Shakespeare and Early Modern Political Thought (with Conal Condren and Andrew Fitzmaurice, Cambridge University Press, 2009)
- The Age of Revolutions in Global Context, c. 1760–1840 (with Sanjay Subrahmanyam, Palgrave 2010)
- Pacific Histories: Ocean, Land, People (with Alison Bashford, Palgrave, 2014)
- A Cultural History of Peace in the Age of Enlightenment (with Stella Ghervas, Bloomsbury Academic, 2020)

== Personal life ==
Armitage was married to Harvard history professor Joyce Chaplin.
