= A. P. Newton =

British historian

Arthur Percival Newton (1873–1942) was a historian of the British Empire who was Rhodes Professor of Imperial History at King's College London from 1920 to 1938. He was a general editor of The Cambridge History of the British Empire.

== Selected publications ==
- The colonising activities of the English Puritans: The last phase of the Elizabethan struggle with Spain. Yale University Press, New Haven, 1914.
- The empire and the future, a series of imperial studies lectures delivered in the University of London, King's College. Macmillan, London, 1916.
- An introduction to the study of colonial history. Society for Promoting Christian Knowledge, London, 1919.
- The staple trades of the empire. Dent, London, 1918.
