= The American Historical Review =

- Front cover of the February 2018 edition
- Discipline: History
- Language: English
- Edited by: Mark Philip Bradley

Publication details
- History: 1895–present
- Publisher: Oxford University Press (United States)
- Frequency: Quarterly, 1895–1967, 2022–present; 5/year, 1967–2021
- Impact factor: 1.807 (2021)

Standard abbreviations
- ISO 4: Am. Hist. Rev.

Indexing
- CODEN: AMHRA2
- ISSN: 0002-8762 (print); 1937-5239 (web)
- LCCN: 05018244
- JSTOR: 00028762
- OCLC no.: 01830326

Links
- Journal homepage; American Historical Review

The American Historical Review is a quarterly academic history journal published by Oxford University Press on behalf of the American Historical Association, for which it is an official publication. It targets readers interested in all periods and facets of history and has often been described as the premier journal of American history in the world.

In the 2011 Journal Citation Reports, the AHR had the highest impact factor among all history journals.

The journal publishes four issues per year, in March, June, September, and December with research articles, reviews, and other items. The acceptance rate for research article submissions is 8-10%. The journal publishes approximately 650 reviews per year.

== History ==
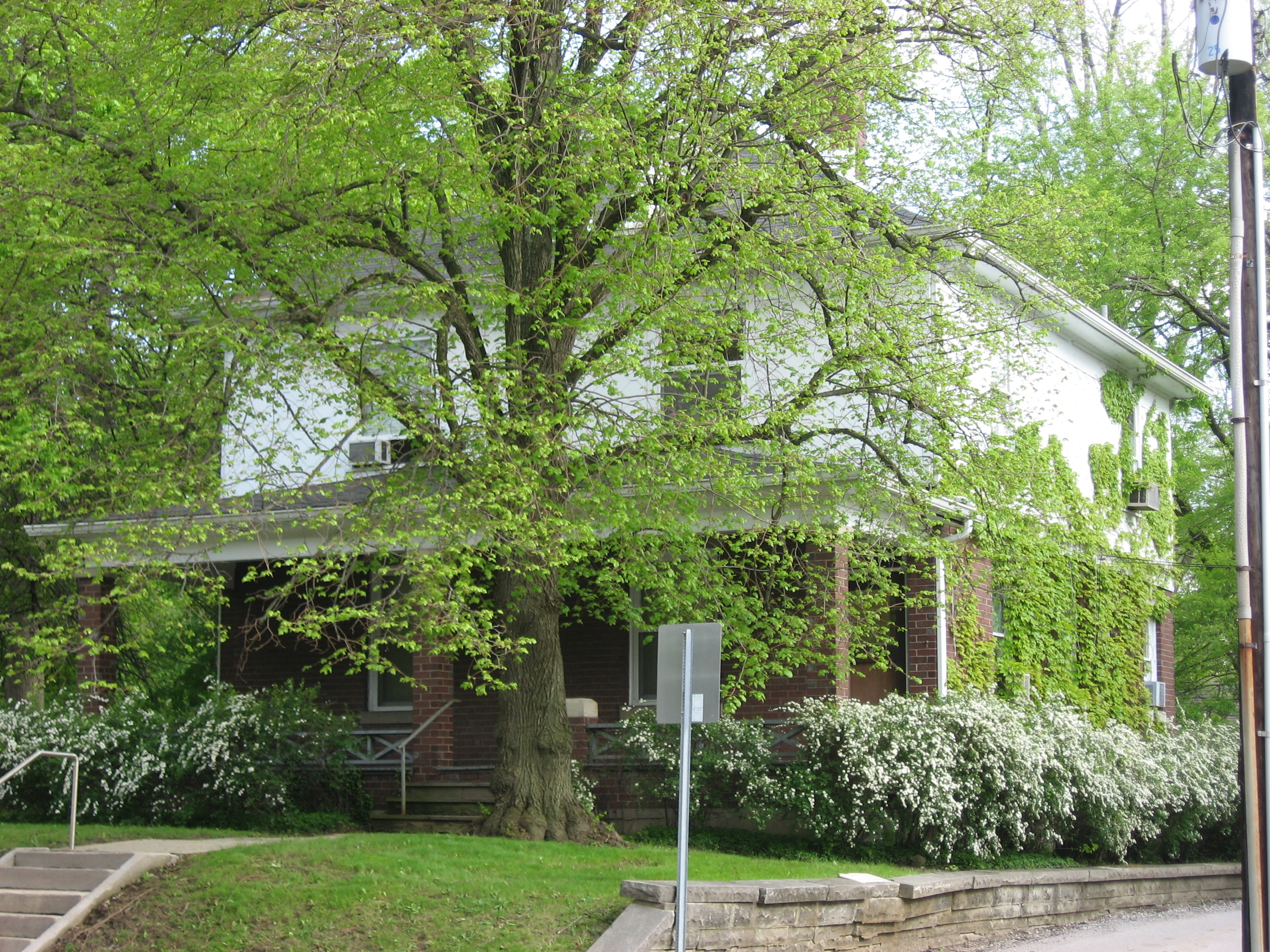
The journal's offices in Bloomington, Indiana

Founded in 1895, The American Historical Review was a joint effort between the history departments at Cornell University and at Harvard University, modeled on The English Historical Review and the French Revue historique, "for the promotion of historical studies, the collection and preservation of historical documents and artifacts, and the dissemination of historical research." Plans to establish a journal were initiated during the American Historical Association meeting in December 1894. At a conference in April 1895, 26 historians from a diverse group of North American universities set out the main guidelines and structure of the journal.

The motivation was to create a journal of history that was more rigorous and scientific than existing historical magazines. It was created at a time when the number of American university historians had increased substantially, with many of them being trained at German universities. In Europe, they had been exposed to rigorous academic journals in history, such as Historische Zeitschrift and Revue Historique.

== Staff and editors ==
The editorial offices are located at the American Historical Association headquarters in Washington D.C., where a small staff produces the publication. The journal is overseen by a board of editors and a team of associate review editors.

From the October 2007 issue until 2011, the journal was published by the University of Chicago Press. As of 2023, the journal has been published by the Oxford University Press.

The editorial board of the AHR is composed of scholars who represent all fields of historical study.

== See also ==
- American Historical Association
- History journals
