= Samita Sen =

Indian historian and academic

Samita Sen is an Indian historian and academic. Having previously taught at the University of Calcutta and Jadavpur University, she has been Vere Harmsworth Professor of Imperial and Naval History at the University of Cambridge since 2018.

== Early life and education ==
Sen studied history at the University of Calcutta, graduating with Bachelor of Arts (BA) and Master of Arts (MA) degrees. She then studied at the University of Cambridge, completing her Doctor of Philosophy (PhD) degree in 1992. Her doctoral thesis was titled Women workers in the Bengal jute industry, 1890-1940: migration, motherhood and militancy.

== Academic career ==
Sen was a Prize Fellow at Trinity College, Cambridge between 1990 and 1994. From 1994 to 2018, she taught history at the University of Calcutta, and women's studies at Jadavpur University. She reached the rank of reader at Calcutta and professor at Jadavpur. She was dean of the Faculty of Interdisciplinary Studies at Jadavpur University from 2016 to 2018. Additionally, she was the first vice-chancellor of Diamond Harbour Women's University from 2013 to 2015; during her time in charge, she was the only permanent member of staff, with lectures mainly given by visiting staff.

Since 1 October 2018, she has been Vere Harmsworth Professor of Imperial and Naval History at the University of Cambridge. She is a fellow of Trinity College, Cambridge.

== Books ==
- Women and Labour in Late Colonial India. The Bengal Jute Industry; Cambridge University Press, 1999
- Domestic Days: Women, Work and Politics in Contemporary Kolkata; (co-authored with Nilanjana Sengupta) Oxford University Press, 2016
