= Vere Harmsworth Professor of Imperial and Naval History =

Professorship at the University of Cambridge

The Vere Harmsworth Professorship of Imperial and Naval History is one of the senior professorships in history at the University of Cambridge. After the Beit Professorship of Colonial History at Oxford (founded in 1905) and the Rhodes Professorship of Imperial History at King's College London (founded in 1919), it is the third oldest chair in its subject in the world.

In 1919 Harold Harmsworth, 1st Viscount Rothermere endowed a "Professorship of Naval History" at Cambridge with a donation of £20,000, in memory of his son Vere who was killed at the Battle of Ancre in November 1916. In 1932 the Royal Empire Society successfully campaigned for Cambridge to accept the renaming of the chair to "The Professorship of Imperial and Naval History", under which rubric a new professor was appointed in 1934. Among the holders of this prestigious chair, only Admiral Sir Herbert Richmond has specialized in naval history, while the others have tended to be scholars of imperial history.

== Vere Harmsworth Professors ==
- John Holland Rose (1919–1933)
- Admiral Sir Herbert Richmond (1934–1936)
- Eric Anderson Walker (1936–1951)
- Edwin Ernest Rich (1951–1971)
- John Andrew Gallagher (1971–1980)
- David Kenneth Fieldhouse (1981–1992)
- Sir Christopher Alan Bayly (1992–2013)
- Alison Bashford (2013–2017)
- Samita Sen (2018–Present)
