= The Cambridge History of India =

The Cambridge History of India was a major work of historical scholarship published in five volumes between 1922 and 1937 by Cambridge University Press. Some volumes were also part of The Cambridge History of the British Empire. Production of the work was slowed by the First World War and the ill health of contributors, and Volume II was eventually abandoned.

The Cambridge Shorter History of India, edited by H. H. Dodwell, appeared in 1934. The New Cambridge History of India was published from the late 1980s.

== Volumes I and II ==
E. J. Rapson noted in his Preface to Volume I that the bulk of that volume had been prepared by 1914, but the onset of the First World War had delayed completion. Rapson was an authority on the coins of ancient India, and once worked in the Department of Coins and Medals at the British Museum. The Times noted in their review of the volume that coin evidence provided some of the only sources for the earliest rulers mentioned, there being in many cases no surviving written sources.

Rapson was known for his scrupulous attention to detail and for checking not only his own references carefully, but the references of every other contributor. He also invariably agreed to help fellow scholars with their work. These factors, possibly combined with increasing age, meant that Volume II of the History, for which he was the editor, was incomplete at the time of his death in 1937. He had confided to colleagues that the slow pace of the work meant that large parts of it needed to be updated to include the latest scholarship. It remains unpublished.

== Volumes III and IV ==
Volumes III and IV were assigned to Wolseley Haig, former Professor of Arabic, Persian and Hindustani at Trinity College, Dublin. Later, lecturer in Persian at the School of Oriental Studies, University of London. Unfortunately, Haig was only able to fully complete volume III before illness set in and volume IV had to be completed by Richard Burn to Haig's plan. It was published in 1937, the year before Haig's death. Reviewers complained it was too old-fashioned in methods; one said it was "history as it was understood by our grandfathers."

== Volumes V and VI ==
Volumes V and VI were edited by H. H. Dodwell, Professor of History and Culture of the British Dominions in Asia at the School of Oriental and African Studies (SOAS) from 1922 to 1946. They doubled as volumes IV and V, respectively, of The Cambridge History of the British Empire.

== Volumes ==
- Vol. I Ancient India. 1922. Edited by E. J. Rapson.
- Vol. II – not published
- Vol. III Turks and Afghans. 1928. Edited by Wolseley Haig.
- Vol. IV The Mughul period. 1937. Planned by Wolseley Haig, edited by Richard Burn.
- Vol. V British India, 1497–1858. 1929. Edited by H. H. Dodwell. (doubles as Vol. IV of The Cambridge History of the British Empire)
- Vol. VI The Indian Empire, 1858–1918. With chapters on the development of administration, 1818–1858. 1932. Edited by H. H. Dodwell. (doubles as Vol. V of The Cambridge history of the British Empire)

Associated works

- Wheeler, Mortimer. (1953) The Indus civilisation: Supplementary volume to The Cambridge History of India. Cambridge: Cambridge University Press. (third edition 1968 linked)
- Sethi, R.R. (1958) The last phase of British sovereignty in India (1919–1947): Being the concluding chapters of The Cambridge history of India, Vol. VI, and The Cambridge shorter history of India. Delhi: S. Chand.

== See also ==
- Historiography of the British Empire
