= Barbara N. Ramusack =

American historian (born 1937)

- Born: Barbara Nelle Ramusack; November 5, 1937 (age 89)

Academic background
- Education: University of Michigan

Academic work
- Institutions: University of Cincinnati
- Main interests: Indian and Chinese History
- Website: Official

Barbara Nelle Ramusack (born November 5, 1937) is an American historian and Charles Phelps Taft Professor of History Emerita at the University of Cincinnati. Her focus was on Indian and Chinese History. She obtained her Ph.D. in 1969 from the University of Michigan.

== Selected bibliography ==
=== Books ===
- Ramusack, Barbara N.; Sievers, Sharon (1999). Women in Asia: restoring women to history. Restoring women to history. Bloomington, Indiana: Indiana University Press. ISBN 9780253212672.
- Ramusack, Barbara N. (2004). The Indian princes and their states. The New Cambridge History of India. Cambridge New York: Cambridge University Press. ISBN 9780521039895.
- Ramusack, Barbara N. History Of contraception In India. India: Penguin. ISBN 9780670081868.

=== Chapters in books ===
- Ramusack, Barbara N. (1981), "Catalysts or helpers? British feminists, Indian women's rights, and Indian independence", in Minault, Gail (ed.), The extended family: women and political participation in India and Pakistan, Columbia, Missouri: South Asia Books, pp. 109–150, ISBN 9780836407655.
- Ramusack, Barbara N. (2004), "Cousins, Margaret Elizabeth (1878–1954)", in Cannadine, David (ed.), Oxford Dictionary of National Biography, Oxford: Oxford University Press, doi:10.1093/ref:odnb/46323.
- Ramusack, Barbara N. (2006), "Authority and ambivalence: Medical women and birth control in India", in Hodges, Sarah (ed.), Reproductive health in India: History, politics, controversies, New perspectives in South Asian history, New Delhi: Orient Longman, pp. 51–84, ISBN 9788125029397.

=== Journal articles ===
- Ramusack, Barbara N. (Fall 1989). "Embattled advocates: The debate over birth control in India, 1920-1940". Journal of Women's History. 1 (2): 34–64. doi:10.1353/jowh.2010.0005.
- Ramusack, Barbara N. (1990). "Cultural missionaries, maternal imperialists, feminist allies: British women activists in India, 1865–1945". Women's Studies International Forum. 13 (4): 309–321. doi:10.1016/0277-5395(90)90028-V.
- Ramusack, Barbara N. (1969). "Incident at Nabha: Interaction between the Indian States and British Indian Politics, The Journal of Asian Studies, Vol. 28, No. 3, pp. 563–577.
