= Eric A. Walker (historian) =

English historian and academic

Eric Anderson Walker (6 September 1886 – 23 February 1976) was an English historian who served as King George V Professor of History at the University of Cape Town and Vere Harmsworth Professor of Imperial and Naval History at the University of Cambridge. He was a pioneer in writing the history of South Africa and later an important historian of the British Empire, though by the end of his life his work was seen as dated and Eurocentric.

== Early life and education ==
Walker was born in Streatham, London on 6 September 1886 to William Walker, a mercantile clerk of Scottish descent, who worked for Union-Castle Line and Jessie née Goodman. He began his education at Mill Hill School, followed by a scholarship to Merton College, Oxford, from where he graduated in modern history with a first class (1908).

== Career ==
=== South Africa ===
Walker was employed as a lecturer at the University of Bristol for a short time, where he co-wrote a textbook for secondary schools on English history that remained in publication for a long time.

In 1911, he ventured south to the newly formed Union of South Africa, where two of his uncles were already employed. He took up a lectureship at the South African College in Cape Town, subsequently the University of Cape Town, where he was soon appointed as a professor of history at the age of 24. He introduced a first-year survey course in 1923, that was taught for sixty years. In the early 1930s, he became the dean of the arts faculty.

Walker was a prolific writer and contributed to South African historiography immensely. He wrote the first historical atlas of South Africa in 1922, the first one-volume history of South Africa for the school-final examination in 1926, and in 1928, the first important general history of South Africa. The latter was reflected pro-British leanings and replaced the settler-centric historiography of George McCall Theal and George Cory to be the official textbook until the 1950s. He was also an accomplished biographer, writing the lives of Lord Henry de Villiers, the former chief justice of the Cape Colony (1925) and W.P. Schreiner (1937) in a sympathetic fashion. His history of The Great Trek (1934) was couched in the narrative of a romantic adventure and he later deemed it to be his best work.

In 1930, Walker gave an influential lecture in Oxford, printed as The frontier tradition in South African history (Oxford University Press, London, 1930), in which he outlined his theory that the origins of the apartheid system in South Africa lay in conflict between blacks and whites on the frontier regions in the nineteenth century which was then imported into the interior where it was institutionalised in the constitutions of the Orange Free State and the South African Republic. Walker's theory owed much to Frederick Jackson Turner and The Oxford History of Historical Writing described him as "in some respects the George Stanley of South Africa". His ideas in this area have since been largely rebutted.

He was a captain in the Cape Garrison Artillery, but left due to cardiac ailments from lifting of heavy ammunition.

=== Cambridge ===
In 1936, Walker became the Vere Harmsworth Professor of Imperial and Naval History at Cambridge University. He continued to write, but with a wider focus than previously now that his chair enjoyed the title of "Imperial".

He acted as an air-raid warden in Cambridge in World War II. By 1942, he was the only history professor still teaching at the university; most of the students and teaching staff had left for the war. In February 1944, Jan Smuts made an offer for him to return to South Africa to be the editor-in-chief of a volume of South African war history. Before Walker was able to take a decision, he suffered a mental breakdown, being treated in a mental hospital for over a year. In July 1946, Walker underwent a leucotomy and was subsequently able to resume teaching.

On the whole, says Ronald Hyam, the war and his mental breakdown meant he had little impact at Cambridge.

=== Retirement ===
Walker retired in 1951, but continued to write. He produced a third edition of his history of South Africa in 1957 (retitled A History of Southern Africa) and edited the second edition of the South African volume of The Cambridge History of the British Empire, published in 1963. This last, however, was criticised for not following the latest historical methods. In 1968, Walker, and wife Lucy, returned to South Africa, where he died in Durban in 1976.

== Personal life ==
He had two sisters and two brothers, one of whom was Graham William Walker. His nephew, through Graham, was motorsport commentator Murray Walker.

Walker married Lucy Stapleton (1883–1977) in 1913 in Cape Town. They had two daughters: Jean (1914–1985) and Hilary (1919–2006). Walker had a keen interest in fishing.

== Selected works ==
- Historical atlas of South Africa. Oxford University Press, Cape Town, 1922.
- Lord de Villiers and his times: South Africa 1842—1914. Constable, London, 1925.
- A history of South Africa. Longmans, Green and Co., London, 1928. (From 1957 titled A history of Southern Africa.)
- The SA College and the University of Cape Town: 1829–1929. Cape Times for the Council of the University of Cape Town, 1929.
- The frontier tradition in South African history. Oxford University Press, London, 1930.
- The great trek. A. & C. Black, London, 1934. (Many later editions.)
- Cambridge history of the British Empire. Volume 8. 1st edition. Cambridge University Press, Cambridge, 1936.
- The British Empire: Its structure and spirit. Royal Institute of International Affairs & Oxford University Press, London, 1943.
- Colonies. Cambridge University Press, Cambridge, 1944.
- The Cambridge History of the British Empire. 2nd edition. Cambridge University Press, Cambridge, 1963. (editor)
