= Department of History (Harvard University) =

School in Cambridge, Massachusetts, US

- Faculty: 60 Core Professors, 10 Affiliated Faculty, 3 Lecturers & Preceptors, 18 Professors Emeriti
- Students: 150-200 undergraduates and 100-130 graduate students
- Location: Cambridge, Massachusetts, United States
- Website: history.fas.harvard.edu

The Department of History is an academic department within the Faculty of Arts and Sciences at Harvard University in Cambridge, Massachusetts, United States.

The department offers bachelor's degrees in history, doctorate degrees in history, and a certificate in digital history.

== History ==
The Harvard History Department is one of the oldest departments focused on historical studies in the United States. As early as 1643, Harvard College required its students to allocate one hour per week to the study of history. Between the mid-1600s and the early 1800s, the subject remained a minor part of the curriculum. In 1839, the university established the McLean Professorship of Ancient and Modern History, the nation's second dedicated history professorship after Cornell University. The chair strengthened the study of history on campus as a distinct discipline worthy of financial investment. Historian, educator, and Unitarian minister, Jared Sparks, held the position between 1839 and 1849, delivering a dozen lectures before the Lowell Institute in Boston in 1842. Sparks played a role in requiring a matriculation examination in Ancient History and Geography.

By the late 1800s, Harvard paved the way for the professionalization of the study of history at the graduate level by awarding its first Doctor of Philosophy in history in 1873. In the 1880s and 1890s, the graduate program trained professional historians, teachers, and statesmen alike such Henry Cabot Lodge who, in 1876, completed his dissertation titled "The Anglo-Saxon Land Law." Members of the department also played a foundational role in creating the American Historical Association in the 1880s, the premier scholarly association for historians in the United States. During this period, W.E.B. Du Bois earned his Ph.D. in history from the department in 1895, becoming the first African American to earn a doctorate from Harvard. His dissertation title was "Suppression of the African Slave Trade in the United States of America, 1638-1871".

In the 1910s, Frederick Jackson Turner, well-known for his "Frontier Thesis," joined the faculty, coming from the University of Wisconsin. He taught at Harvard until 1924 and influenced the study of American history. Many others joined him in furthering the department as one of the hubs for the study of the American past. Arthur M. Schlesinger Sr. arrived in 1924. He pushed the department, which in turn influenced the broader historical profession, towards social history, emphasizing the study of everyday life and social movements. He was later joined by his son, Arthur M Schlesinger Jr., an intellectual historian who also served as an advisor to President John F. Kennedy. John K. Fairbank, a historian of China, came in 1924 and helped build a center for East Asian Studies that is now named after him (Fairbank Center for Chinese Studies). Edwin O. Reischauer built on Fairbank's focus on global and non-Western historian by expanding the curriculum to include Japanese history. Additionally, Helen Maud Cam, a medieval historian from Cambridge University, became the first woman to hold a tenured professorship at Harvard in 1948. Other notable historians who joined the department during the twentieth century include Carter G. Woodson, one of the founders of African American historiography, Bernard Bailyn, a Pulitzer Prize winner and historian of the American Revolution, and Oscar Handlin, who pioneered the history of immigration.

During the 2000s, the department's foremost civil war historian, Drew Gilpin Faust, became Harvard's first female president after leading the Radcliffe Institute.

== Academics ==
The Harvard University Department of History is home to some of the world's leading and most renowned scholars in history. The department focuses on multiple areas within history "including social life, the economy, culture, thought, and politics. Students of history study individuals, groups, communities, and nations from every imaginable perspective." The department also runs the History of Science program, which "deals with important questions about the rise and impact of science, medicine, and technology, both east and west, and at all periods, including the very recent past."

Undergraduate students can concentrate in history and receive an A.B. degree. Students are also able to take courses in joint-degree programs, including the Joint Concentration in Ancient History (Greek and Roman), the Joint Concentration in East Asian History, and the Joint Concentration in Near Eastern History.

Graduate students can work towards a M.A. or Ph.D. in history. Students may also work towards a joint J.D. / Ph.D. degree.

The department is affiliated with a number of research centers and programs at Harvard, including:

- Center for Hellenic Studies
- Charles Warren Center for Studies in American History
- Harvard Collection of Historical Scientific Instruments
- Harvard Ukrainian Research Institute
- W. E. B. Du Bois Institute
- Weatherhead Center for International Affairs

== Harvard and Slavery ==
The Harvard and Slavery initiative was established in 2006 in order to recognize and "research the historical connections between Harvard University and slavery". The program began as Harvard and Slavery: Seeking a Forgotten History, which summarized undergraduate research linking the history of slavery to local history. According to professor of history Sven Beckert, "We want to inspire others to dig deeper into this history, but even more so we want to encourage a broader debate on what this history means for us today." A report on the findings of this research (Full Report of the Findings of History 84G) was subsequently published in 2011. They found that Harvard was supported by donations from a slave-based economy, affiliated with scholars who promoted ideas of scientific racism, and hired professors and students who owned slaves.

In 2016, then Harvard University President Drew Gilpin Faust and Congressman John Lewis unveiled a plaque dedicated to the memory of four enslaved people, Titus, Venus, Bilhah, and Juba, who worked at the university. Scholars described this ceremony as an important step in recognizing the historic legacy of slavery. In 2017, a memorial was built at Harvard Law School to honor "the enslaved whose labor created wealth that made possible the founding of the Harvard Law School." The next University President, Lawrence S. Bacow, announced another $5 million would be invested to continue investigating Harvard's ties to slavery, led by Radcliffe Institute for Advanced Study Dean Tomiko Brown-Nagin.

In January 2025, Harvard University laid off the staff of the Harvard Slavery Remembrance Program, a team responsible for identifying the direct descendants of those enslaved by Harvard-affiliated administrators, faculty, and staff. In response, Harvard history professor Vincent Brown resigned from the initiative. In his resignation letter, he wrote that he "learned that the entire [HSRP] team had been laid off in sudden telephone calls with an office in Harvard's human resources department." According to the fired founding director of the remembrance program, Richard Cellini, the vice provost Sara Bleich had instructed him "not to find too many descendants." University officials announced that the efforts to connect with descendants will continue through a third party.

== Rankings ==
The Department of History is frequently cited as one of the premier institutions for the study of history. U.S. News & World Report ranks the department at #4. According to the QS World University rankings in history, Harvard has consistently ranked first among history faculties worldwide from 2020 to 2023.

== Notable faculty ==
- David Armitage
- Sven Beckert
- Allan M. Brandt
- Vincent Brown
- Tomiko Brown-Nagin
- Joyce Chaplin
- Lizabeth Cohen
- Emma Dench
- Peter Galison
- Drew Gilpin Faust
- Peter Gordon
- Andrew Gordon
- Annette Gordon-Reed
- Evelynn Hammonds
- Tamar Herzog
- Maya Jasanoff
- Walter Johnson
- Cemal Kafadar
- Joseph Koerner
- Ewa Lajer-Burcharth
- Jill Lepore
- Charles S. Maier
- Tiya Miles
- Naomi Oreskes
- Fredrik Logevall
