= Diamond Harbour Women's University =

University in West Bengal, India

- ডায়মন্ড হারবার মহিলা বিশ্ববিদ্যালয়
- Type: Public
- Established: 28 January 2013 (13 years ago)
- Academic affiliations: UGC; AIU
- Budget: ₹11.77 crore (US$1.2 million) (2023–24)
- Chancellor: Governor of West Bengal
- Vice-Chancellor: Mita Bandhopadhyay
- Academic staff: 71 (2025)
- Students: 1,558 (2025)
- Undergraduates: 284 (2025)
- Postgraduates: 1,123 (2025)
- Doctoral students: 151 (2025)
- Location: Diamond Harbour, West Bengal, 743368, India; 22°15′28.30″N 88°11′34.77″E
- Campus: Suburb
- Website: dhwu.ac.in

Diamond Harbour Women's University is a women's university in Diamond Harbour, West Bengal. Established in 2013, it is the state's first women's university which will provide an education in humanities and basic sciences.

== Organisation and Administration ==
The Vice-chancellor of the Diamond Harbour Women's University is the chief executive officer of the university. Mita Bandhopadhyay is the current Vice-chancellor of the university.

List of All Vice-Chancellors
No.	Name
1.	Prof. Samita Sen
2.	Prof. Anuradha Mukhopadhyay
–	Prof. Kajal De (acting)
3.	Prof. Mita Bandhopadhyay

=== Faculties and Departments ===
Diamond Harbour Women's University has 13 departments organized into three schools.

- Faculty of Science

Thus School consists of the departments of Mathematics, Physics, Chemistry, Geography, and Zoology.

- Faculty of Arts

This school consists of the departments of Bengali, English, Sanskrit, History, Political Science, Philosophy, Education, and Women's Studies.

== Notable people ==
- Samita Sen, first Vice-Chancellor (2013–2015)

== See also ==
- List of universities in India
- Education in West Bengal
