= The Cambridge History of the British Empire =

The Cambridge History of the British Empire was a major work of historical scholarship published in eight volumes between 1929 and 1961 by Cambridge University Press. Volume seven was divided into two parts. The general editors were John Holland Rose, A. P. Newton and Ernest Alfred Benians. The original set of eight volumes was issued between 1929 and 1936. A number of the volumes were reissued in revised and expanded editions.

The work appeared during a period of transition from the British Empire to the British Commonwealth and the position of the United Kingdom with respect to its colonies was very different by the time the last volume appeared in 1959 to what it had been in 1929. This was reflected in reaction to the later volumes and the historiographical approaches taken. Eric Walker's second edition of the South Africa volume in 1963, for instance, was criticised for using an outdated approach and the series is currently out of print. The Cambridge Illustrated History of the British Empire, a one-volume work edited by P. J. Marshall, was published in 1996 but that also is out of print.

Historian Caroline Elkins has described the work as promoting a teleological Whig history of the British Empire that minimises, ignores or explains away the role of violence in expanding and maintaining the British Empire.

== Volumes ==
- Volume I: Rose, John Holland; Newton, A. P.; Benians, Ernest Alfred, eds. (1929). The Old Empire From The Beginnings To 1783. The Cambridge History of the British Empire. Vol. I. Cambridge University Press.
- Volume II: Rose, John Holland; Newton, A. P.; Benians, Ernest Alfred, eds. (1968) [1940]. The Growth of the New Empire: 1783–1870. The Cambridge History of the British Empire. Vol. II. Cambridge University Press.
- Volume III: Benians, Ernest Alfred; Butler, J. R. M.; Mansergh, P. N. S.; Walker, E. A., eds. (1959). The Empire-Commonwealth: 1870–1919. The Cambridge History of the British Empire. Vol. III. Cambridge University Press.
- Volume IV: Dodwell, H. H., ed. (1929). British India: 1497–1858. The Cambridge History of the British Empire. Vol. IV. Cambridge University Press. Doubled as volume V of The Cambridge History of India.
- Volume V: Dodwell, H. H., ed. (1932). The Indian Empire: 1858–1918. The Cambridge History of the British Empire. Vol. V. Cambridge University Press. Doubled as volume VI of The Cambridge History of India.
- Volume VI: Rose, John Holland; Newton, A. P.; Benians, Ernest Alfred, eds. (1930). Canada and Newfoundland. The Cambridge History of the British Empire. Vol. VI. Cambridge University Press.
- Volume VII Part 1: Rose, J. Holland; Newton, A. P.; Benians, Ernest Alfred, eds. (1933). Australia. The Cambridge History of the British Empire. Vol. VII Part I. Cambridge University Press. Reissued in unaltered form in 1988 for the Australian Bicentenary.
- Volume VII Part 2: Rose, John Holland; Newton, A. P.; Benians, Ernest Alfred, eds. (1933). New Zealand. The Cambridge History of the British Empire. Vol. VII Part II. Cambridge University Press.
- Volume VIII: Newton, A. P.; Benians, Ernest Alfred, eds. (1936). South Africa, Rhodesia and the Protectorates. The Cambridge History of the British Empire. Vol. VIII. Cambridge University Press. Second edition (1963) edited by Eric A. Walker.

== See also ==
- Historiography of the British Empire
- The Cambridge Illustrated History of the British Empire
- The Oxford History of the British Empire
