= Susan Bayly =

Professor

Susan Bayly is Professor Emerita of Historical Anthropology in the Cambridge University Department of Social Anthropology and a Life Fellow of Christ's College, Cambridge. She is a former editor of the Journal of the Royal Anthropological Institute.

Her research interests include the South Asian caste system. She was married to fellow Cambridge historian, Christopher Bayly, until his death in 2015.

To mark her retirement, and her scholarly works, former students and colleagues published a collected volume of essays in her honour in 2023, and in 2025, she contributed to a collection of reflections on her work in the journal Religion and Society.

== Works ==
- Susan Bayly (May 2024). Asian Lives in Anthropological Perspective. Berghahn Books. ISBN 978-1-80539-500-3.
- Susan Bayly (2007). Asian Voices in a Post-Colonial Age: Vietnam, India and Beyond. Cambridge University Press. ISBN 978-0-521-86885-3.
- Susan Bayly (22 February 2001). Caste, Society and Politics in India from the Eighteenth Century to the Modern Age. The New Cambridge History of India. Cambridge University Press. ISBN 978-0-521-79842-6.
- Susan Bayly (1989). Saints, Goddesses and Kings: Muslims and Christians in South Indian Society, 1700-1900. Cambridge University Press. ISBN 978-0-521-37201-5.
