= Christopher Bayly =

British historian (1945–2015)

- Born: 18 May 1945
- Died: 18 April 2015 (aged 69); Hyde Park, Chicago
- Education: Balliol College, Oxford; St Antony's College, Oxford
- Occupations: Historian, Author

Sir Christopher Alan Bayly, FBA, FRSL (18 May 1945 – 18 April 2015) was a British historian specialising in British Imperial, Indian and global history. From 1992 to 2013, he was Vere Harmsworth Professor of Imperial and Naval History at the University of Cambridge.

== Biography ==
Bayly was from Tunbridge Wells, England, where he attended The Skinners School. He studied at Balliol College, Oxford and graduated with a Bachelor of Arts (BA) degree. He then remained at the University of Oxford and undertook post-graduate study at St Antony's College, Oxford. He completed his Doctor of Philosophy (DPhil) degree in 1970 with a thesis titled The development of political organisation in the Allahabad locality, 1880–1925 under John Andrew Gallagher.

Bayly was the Vere Harmsworth Professor of Imperial and Naval History at the University of Cambridge from 1992 to 2013. He was also a trustee of the British Museum. In 2007, he succeeded Sir John Baker as President of St Catharine's College, Cambridge. Bayly also became the Director of Cambridge's Centre of South Asian Studies. He was co-editor of The New Cambridge History of India and sat on the editorial board of various academic journals. He also served on the inaugural Social Sciences jury for the Infosys Prize in 2009.

In 1990, Bayly was elected a Fellow of the British Academy (FBA). In 2004 he was awarded the Wolfson History Oeuvre Prize for his many contributions to the discipline. In the 2007 Queen's Birthday Honours, it was announced that he had been appointed a Knight Bachelor 'for services to History'. Upon being informed of the knighthood, he stated: "I regard this not only as a great personal honour but, as an historian of India, as recognition of the growing importance of the history of the non-western world."

Bayly was married to Susan Bayly, a professor of historical anthropology at the University of Cambridge. Bayly died in Hyde Park, Chicago, on 18 April 2015, a month before his 70th birthday. He was in his second and last year as the Vivekananda Visiting Professor when he died. In 2016, Bayly became the first person to be posthumously awarded the Toynbee Prize for global history. After Bayly's death, the Royal Asiatic Society established in his honour the annual Bayly Prize for a distinguished doctoral thesis in an Asian subject.

== Selected bibliography ==
- The Local Roots of Indian Politics: Allahabad, 1880–1920 (1975)
- Rulers, Townsmen and Bazaars: North Indian Society in the Age of British Expansion, 1770–1870 (1983)
- Indian Society and the Making of the British Empire (1988)
- Imperial Meridian: The British Empire and the World, 1780–1830. London and New York: Longman (1989)
- Empire and Information: Intelligence Gathering and Social Communication in India, 1780–1870 (1996)
- Origins of Nationality in South Asia: Patriotism and Ethical Government in the Making of Modern India (1997)
- The Birth of the Modern World: 1780–1914 (2004)
- Bayly, Christopher; Harper, Timothy (2005). Forgotten Armies: The Fall of British Asia, 1941–1945. Harvard University Press. ISBN 978-0-674-01748-1.
- Bayly, Christopher; Harper, Timothy (2007). Forgotten Wars: Freedom and Revolution in Southeast Asia. Harvard University Press. ISBN 978-0-674-02153-2.
- Bayly, Christopher Alan (2012). Recovering Liberties: Indian Thought in the Age of Liberalism and Empire. Cambridge University Press. ISBN 978-1-139-50518-5.
- Remaking the Modern World, 1900–2015: Global Connections and Comparisons (2018)
