= Om Prakash (historian) =

Indian economic historian (born 1940)

- Awards: Order of the Netherlands Lion

Academic background
- Education: Delhi School of Economics

Om Prakash (born January 1940, in Delhi) is an Indian economic historian. He is noted for his work on the Dutch East India Company in Bengal, and also for his work on coinage, precious metal trade, and other aspects of pre-colonial commerce between Europe and India. In 2005, he was knighted by the Dutch queen.

== Early life and education ==
He did his M.A. from the Delhi School of Economics in 1961, ranking first, and continued with his PhD in Economic History. His thesis, The Dutch East India Company and the Economy of Bengal, 1630-1720, is based on archival material from the Nationaal Archief at the Hague. It was published as a book by the Princeton University Press in 1985.

== Career ==
Subsequently, Prakash joined the Delhi School of Economics faculty from 1965 and 2005. His work is highly regarded in the Netherlands, where he is a Foreign Member of the Royal Netherlands Academy of Arts and Sciences, Haarlem (since 2000). In April 2005, he was honoured as a "Knight in the Order of the Netherlands Lion" by Queen Beatrix.

He is also the author of European commercial enterprise in pre-colonial India (1998), published under the New Cambridge History of India series (part II, v.5).
