= Munis D. Faruqui =

Munis D. Faruqui is an Indian historian and an associate professor, Department of South and Southeast Asian Studies, University of California, Berkeley.

He has written a number of books such as Aurangzeb 'Alamgir and the Mughal Empire: A History Retold.
