= Edwin Rich (historian) =

English historian (1904–1979)

Edwin Ernest Rich
- Born: 4 August 1904; Bristol, England
- Died: 7 July 1979; Heydon, England
- Occupation: Historian

Edwin Ernest Rich (4 August 1904 – 7 July 1979) was a 20th-century historian.

== Education ==
Rich was born in Bristol. He was educated at Colston's School and Selwyn College, Cambridge. He was fellow of St Catharine's College, Cambridge, from 1930 to 1957; Proctor of Cambridge University in 1939; Vere Harmsworth Professor of Imperial and Naval History from 1951 to 1970; and Master of St Catharine's College, Cambridge from 1957 to 1973. He died in Heydon, Cambridgeshire, in 1979.
