= Society of Bead Researchers =

Scholarly society for bead research

- Formation: 1981
- Founder: Peter Francis, Jr., Elizabeth J. Harris, Jamey D. Allen
- Type: Nonprofit
- Purpose: Scientific study of beads
- Headquarters: PO Box 13719
- Location: Portland, OR, USA
- President: J. Mark Kenoyer
- Website: beadresearch.org

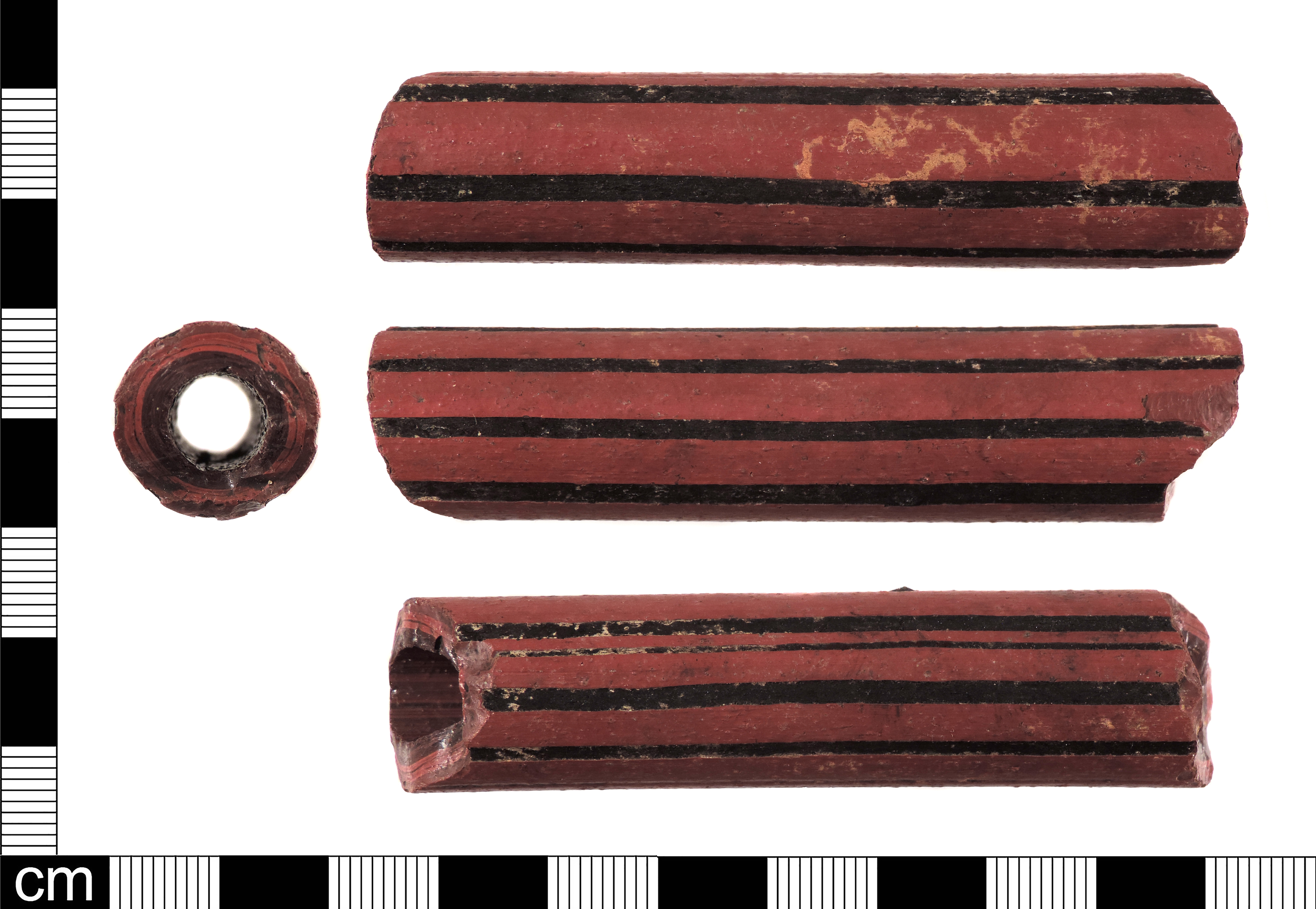
An incomplete Post Medieval production tube for bead manufacture dating from the 17th century.

The Society of Bead Researchers is a scholarly association for those studying beads and beadmaking in the context of history, ethnology and archaeology worldwide. The society was founded in 1981 by Peter Francis, Jr., director of the Center for Bead Research in Lake Placid, New York, Elizabeth J. Harris and Jamey D. Allen. The Society of Bead Researchers was officially incorporated as a tax-exempt, non-profit corporation in 1999.

The society publishes a scholarly journal, Beads: Journal of the Society of Bead Researchers, which first appeared in 1989. The founding and current editor of Beads is Karlis Karklins, formerly Head of Material Culture Research at Parks Canada.

The society also publishes a biannual newsletter, The Bead Forum. The Bead Forum was first published in 1982. Its purpose was to enhance communication between isolated researchers and "promote the scientific study of beads". The Bead Forum, particularly prior to the first publication of Beads, has included information on the materials, cultures, geographies, and time periods of beads. A 2009 issue of Beads, "Twenty Years of The Bead Forum", republished a selection of 85 articles on bead research from the newsletter's first twenty years. The Bead Forum newsletter is currently edited by Michele Hoferitza at Utah State University.

The current president of the Society of Bead Researchers is J. Mark Kenoyer of the University of Wisconsin-Madison, and the Secretary/Treasurer is Alice Scherer. Previous presidents include Peter Francis, Jr. (1982-1986), Marvin T. Smith (1987-1990), Jamey D. Allen (1991-1993), Mary Elizabeth Good (1994-1996), Jeffrey M. Mitchem (1997-2003), Roderick Sprague (2004-2007), William T. Billeck (2008-2013) and Stefany Tomalin (2014-2016).
