= John Holland Rose =

English historian (1855–1942)

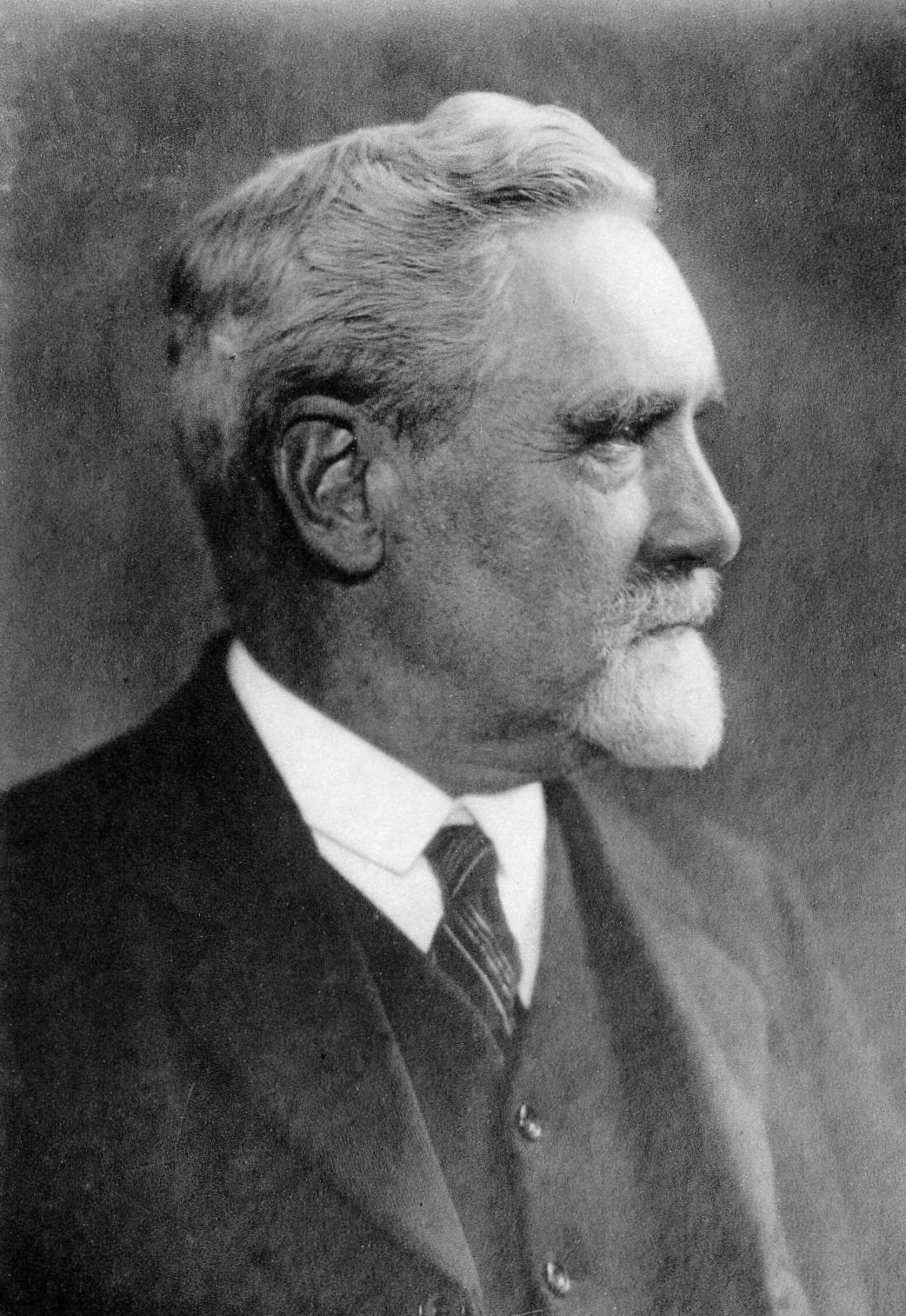
- Born: 28 June 1855; Bedford, England
- Died: 3 March 1942 (aged 86); Cambridge, England
- Education: Bedford Modern School
- Alma mater: Owen's College, Manchester; Christ's College, Cambridge

John Holland Rose (28 June 1855 – 3 March 1942) was an influential English historian who wrote famous biographies of William Pitt the Younger and of French emperor Napoleon Bonaparte. He also wrote a history of Europe, entitled The Development of the European Nations among other historical works. He was Vere Harmsworth Professor of Imperial and Naval History at the University of Cambridge between 1919 and his retirement in 1934.

== Career ==
Holland Rose was born in Bedford in 1855. He was educated at Bedford Modern School where he was an exhibitioner, at Owens College, Manchester, and at Christ's College, Cambridge.

In 1911–1919, Holland Rose was a reader in modern history at the University of Cambridge. He was the first Vere Harmsworth Professor of Naval History at the University of Cambridge between 1919 and his retirement in 1933. He was an honorary member of the Polish Academy of Arts and Sciences.

Holland Rose was the basis for C. P. Snow's fictional character M. H. L. Gay (see "Years of Hope: Cambridge, Colonial Administrator in the South Seas, and Cricket" by Philip Snow).

== Family life ==
In 1880, Holland Rose married Laura K. Haddon; they had one son, Charles and two daughters.

He died on 3 March 1942.

== Selected works ==
- A Century of Continental History, 1780–1880 (London: E. Stanford, 1891; 2nd ed. 1906) read online
- The Revolutionary and Napoleonic Era, 1789–1815 (Cambridge University Press, 1894, 1904, 1919, 1925) read online
- The Rise of Democracy (London: Blackie and Son, 1897, 1904, 1912) read online
- The Rise and Growth of Democracy in Great Britain (Chicago: Stone, 1898) read online
- The Life of Napoleon I (2 vols.) (1902; 11th ed. 1935) read online
- The French Revolution: A History, by Thomas Carlyle (ed.) (London: G. Bell, 1902) read online
- Napoleonic Studies (London: G. Bell, 1904, 1914) read online
- Select Despatches from the British Foreign Office Archives, Relating to the Formation of the Third Coalition Against France, 1804–1805 (London: Royal Historical Society, 1904) read online
- The Development of the European Nations; 1870–1921 (6th ed.). New York and London: G.P. Putnam's Sons. 1922 – via Internet Archive. read online
- Dumouriez and the Defence of England Against Napoleon (with Alexander Meyrick Broadley) (London: J. Lane, 1908) read online
- A History of Malta During the Period of the French and British Occupations, 1798–1815 (by William Hardman) (ed. John Holland Rose) (London: Longman, Green and Company, 1909) read online
- William Pitt and National Revival (London: G. Bell and Sons, 1911) read online
- William Pitt and the Great War. G. Bell and Sons. 1911.
- The Personality of Napoleon: The Lowell Lectures for 1912 (New York: G.P. Putnam's Sons, 1912, 1930) read online
- Pitt and Napoleon: Essays and Letters (London: C. Bell and Sons, Ltd., 1912) read online
- How the War Came About. London: The Patriotic Publishing Co., 1914
- The Origins of War: Lectures Delivered in the Michaelmas Term, 1914 (Cambridge University Press, 1914) read online
- The Origins of the War, 1871–1914 (New York: G.P. Putnam's Sons, 1915) read online
- Germany in the Nineteenth Century: Five Lectures by J. H. Rose, C. H. Herford, E. C. K. Gonner, and M. E. Sadler, with an introductory note by Viscount Haldane, ed. C.H. Herford (Manchester: Manchester University Press, 1915) read online
- Nationality as a Factor in Modern History (London: Rivingtons, 1916) read online
- Nationality in Modern History (New York: Macmillan and Company, 1916) read online
- Why We Carry On (London: T.F. Unwin, 1918) read online
- Naval History and National History: The Inaugural Lecture Delivered to the University of Cambridge on Trafalgar Day, 1919 (Cambridge University Press, 1919) read online
- Lord Hood and the Defence of Toulon (University of Cambridge Press, 1922) read online
- The Indecisiveness of Modern War, and Other Essays (Kennikat Press, 1927) read online
- Contributor to The Thinkers of the Revolutionary Era (1930)
- The Mediterranean in the Ancient World (Cambridge University Press, 1933) read online
- Man and the Sea: Stages in Maritime and Human Progress (W. Heffer and Sons, 1935) read online
- Co-editor of and contributor to The Cambridge History of the British Empire
- Chapters in The Cambridge Modern History (vols. viii and ix), and The Cambridge History of British Foreign Policy (vol. i)
- Articles in English Historical Review, Edinburgh, Nineteenth Century and After, Contemporary Review, Cambridge Historical Journal, et al.
