= H. H. Dodwell =

English Indologist (1879–1946)

Henry Herbert Dodwell (1879 – 30 October 1946) was Professor of History and Culture of the British Dominions in Asia at the School of Oriental and African Studies (SOAS) from 1922 to 1946. He was the first holder of that chair.

Dodwell was educated at Thame Grammar School, then at St. John's College, University of Oxford. In 1908 he married Lily May, daughter of Henry Mason. They had four children. Dodwell entered the Indian Education Service in 1908 and was there until 1922, just before the service began to be dismantled. After his return to Britain, Dodwell edited two volumes of The Cambridge History of India. He died in Chertsey, 30 October 1946, aged 67.

A small amount of papers relating to Dodwell, donated in 1989, are held in the SOAS archive.

== Selected publications ==
- A sketch of the history of India from 1858-1918. Longmans Green & Co., 1925.
- The Cambridge History of India Vol. V British India, 1497-1858. Cambridge, Cambridge University Press, 1929. (Editor) (doubles as Vol. IV of The Cambridge History of the British Empire)
- The founder of modern Egypt: A study of Muhamad 'Ali. Cambridge, University Press, 1931.
- The Cambridge History of India Vol. VI The Indian Empire, 1858-1918. With chapters on the development of administration, 1818-1858. Cambridge, Cambridge University Press, 1932. (Editor) (doubles as Vol. V of The Cambridge History of the British Empire)
- The Cambridge shorter history of India. Cambridge, Cambridge University Press, 1934. (Editor)

The papers of H. H. Dodwell including illustrations and letters relating to India are held by SOAS Archives.

== Archives ==
The papers of H H Dodwell are held by SOAS Special Collections
