= Joyce Chaplin =

American historian and academic (born 1960)

Academic background
- Education: Northwestern University, Johns Hopkins University

Academic work
- Discipline: History
- Institutions: Vanderbilt University, Harvard University

Joyce E. Chaplin (born July 28, 1960, in Antioch, California) is an American historian and academic known for her writing and research on early American history, environmental history, and intellectual history. She is the James Duncan Phillips Professor of Early American History at Harvard University. She was a Guggenheim Fellow and American Academy of Arts and Sciences Fellow of 2019. In 2020 she was elected to the American Philosophical Society. She is on the Editorial Board of the Journal of the History of Ideas.

== Life ==
After receiving her BA from Northwestern University and her PhD from Johns Hopkins University in 1986, she taught at Vanderbilt University in Nashville for fourteen years (1986-2000). She became Professor of History at Harvard in 2000.

== Selected works ==
- An Anxious Pursuit: Agricultural Innovation and Modernity in the Lower South, 1730-1815 Chapel Hill: University of North Carolina Press, 1993. ISBN 9780807846131, OCLC 916396138
- Subject Matter: Technology, the Body, and Science on the Anglo-American Frontier, 1500-1676 Cambridge, Mass. : Harvard University Press, 2001. ISBN 9780674004535, OCLC 924957626
- The First Scientific American: Benjamin Franklin and the Pursuit of Genius New York : Basic Books, 2006. ISBN 9780465009558, OCLC 62897551
- Round About the Earth: Circumnavigation from Magellan to Orbit New York: Simon & Schuster, 2012. ISBN 9781416596196, OCLC 779266177
- with Alison Bashford, The New Worlds of Thomas Robert Malthus: Re-reading the Principle of Population, Princeton : Princeton University Press, 2016. ISBN 9780691164199, OCLC 995299915
