= American Institute of Afghanistan Studies =

American non-profit organization

The American Institute of Afghanistan Studies (AIAS), founded in 2003, is a non-profit organization dedicated to promoting the advanced study of Afghanistan in the United States. The institute is housed at Boston University in Massachusetts. The center is a member of the Council of American Overseas Research Centers.

John F. Richards, of Duke University in North Carolina, was in the vanguard of establishing the AIAS and its inaugural meeting was held at Duke.

Since its founding many academic institutions from across the United States have become affiliated with the institute. Among these are: Boston University, Columbia University, University of Chicago, New York University, University of Michigan, University of Virginia, and James Madison University.

The Institute promotes multi-disciplinary approaches to the study of Afghanistan and provides a fellowship grant available by application to those seeking to do field-work in Afghanistan while pursuing a relevant PhD.

The official journal of the American Institute of Afghanistan Studies is Afghanistan: Journal of the American Institute of Afghanistan Studies (ISSN 2399-357X), which has been published twice yearly beginning in 2018 by Edinburgh University Press. Afghanistan Studies is where Near Eastern Studies, Central Asian Studies, and South Asian Studies overlap. The journal, therefore, does not focus solely on geographic Afghanistan, but publishes articles that straddle these three subject areas where the pre-modern histories and cultures of Afghanistan connect.
