= Rupununi uprising =

Secessionist insurrection in Guyana

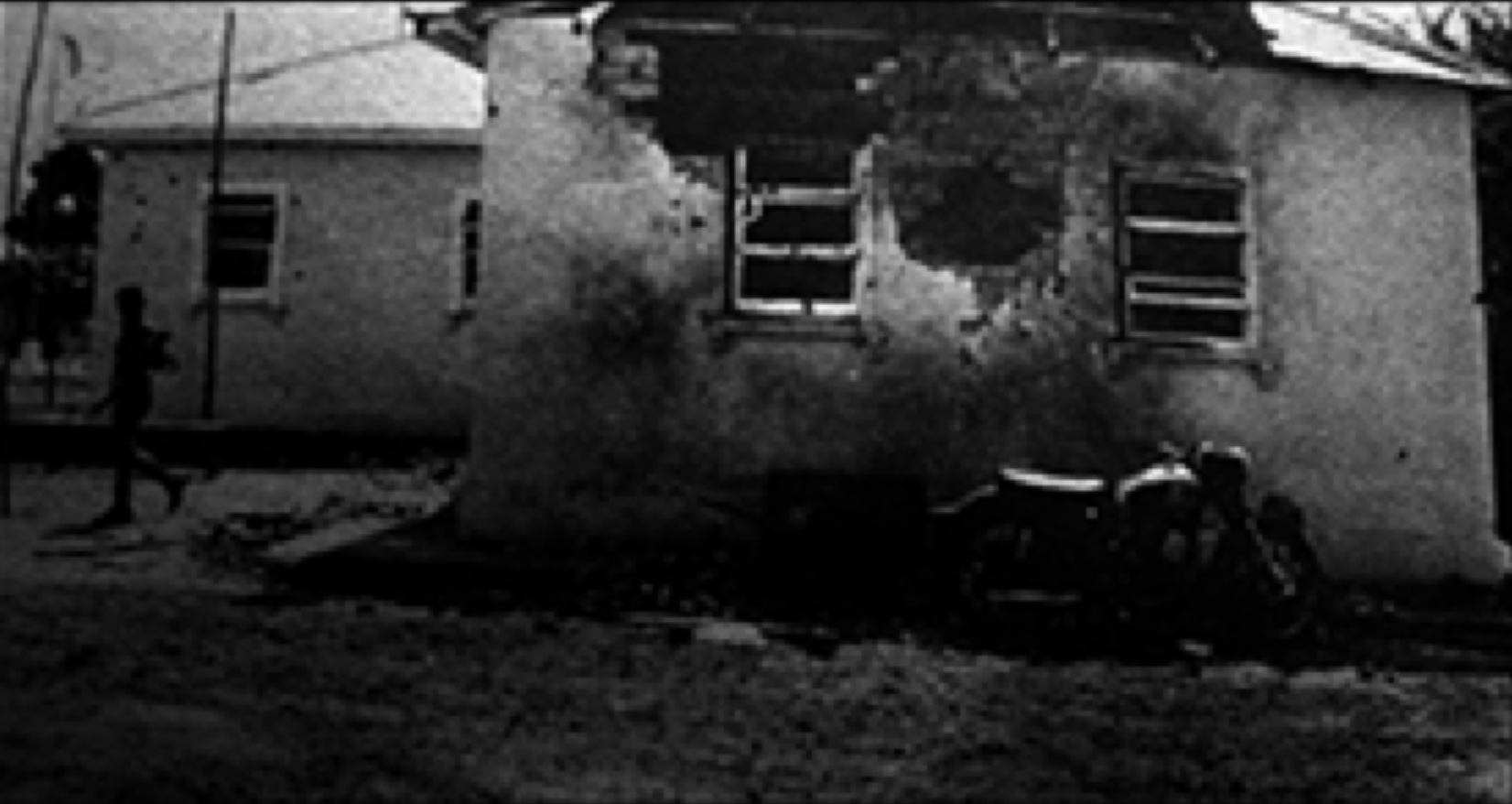
- Damage to the Lethem police station from rebel bazookas
Date	2–4 January 1969
Location	Upper Takutu-Upper Essequibo
Result	Guyanese victory

Belligerents
(Guyana (1966–1970)) Guyana: Guyana Defence Force	Rupununi rebels Supported by: Venezuela (Note: Venezuela denies any involvement in the rebellion.)

Commanders and leaders
(Guyana) Forbes Burnham	Valerie Hart; Elmo Hart; James Hart; Averrel Melville

Strength
200 soldiers	120–300 rebels

Casualties and losses
5 police officers killed 2 civilians killed 20 total wounded	2–3 Amerindians killed 28 rebels arrested

The Rupununi uprising was a secessionist insurrection in Guyana that began on 2 January 1969, led by cattle ranchers who sought to control 22,300 square miles (58,000 km^{2}) of land. Occurring less than two years after Guyana's independence from the United Kingdom, it constituted the country's earliest and most severe test of statehood and social solidarity. The rebels were ultimately dispersed by the Guyana Defence Force, with the group's leaders fleeing to Venezuela.

== Background ==
=== Guyana–Venezuela territorial dispute ===
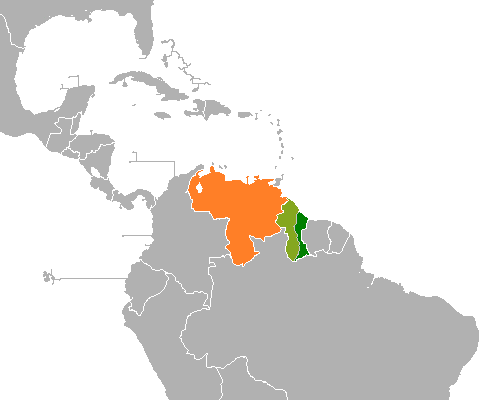
The Essequibo is in light green, with the rest of Guyana is shown in dark green and Venezuela in orange.

Venezuela supported and equipped the Rupununi rebels and their secession movement according to various academic sources. In the Journal of Global South Studies, Taylor wrote, "Guyana faced a serious external threat from its much larger neighbor, Venezuela, which was pressing its historic claim to two-thirds of Guyana, the area west of the Essequibo River", further stating that while the Guyana Defence Force had 750 soldiers with no navy or aviation units, the Venezuelan Armed Forces had 15,000 troops along with a well-functioning air force and navy.

Shortly after Guyana achieved its independence from the United Kingdom and the departure of the British Armed Forces in May 1966, Venezuela began to encroach on Guyana's territory, with Venezuelan troops capturing and occupying Ankoko Island in October 1966. In 1967, reports emerged that Venezuela was enacting economic warfare against Guyana and later in the year, a British national was expelled from Guyana for provoking indigenous groups to support Venezuela territorial claims. Venezuela then made territorial claims in August 1968 that land two miles to the east that spanned from the Amacuro River to the Essequibo River. Simultaneously with its other actions, Venezuela launched a propaganda campaign to support its claims that included "hints of a developing revolutionary war against Guyana" according to Rau, with Venezuelan diplomat Carlos Perez DeLaCova saying in a letter to The New York Times that Venezuelans were "victims of British expansionism, and Guyana is the heir and beneficiary of that encroachment on our territory."

According to Jackson, Venezuela established "Amerindian subordination and displacement" by arguing that indigenous peoples were not present in certain areas and demanded that Spain's own imperial claims were to be respected.

=== Ranch leadership ===
The rebellion was primarily led by ranch heads who feared their land rights would be revoked by the new Guyanese government following the 1968 Guyanese general election. The Hart family was one of the main groups organizing the plot. Valerie Hart, a United Force politician, her two brothers, James and Elmo, and two Americans named Harry and Richard Lawrence, also led the rebellion. Another participant was Clement Tezarik, son of a Czechoslovak miner.

The motive for the rebellion has been in dispute. The rebellion was led by ranch owners, with the New York Times saying the ranchers "objected to the Negro-dominated Government of Prime Minister Forbes Burnham." Guyanese Agriculture Minister Robert Jordan declared that the government would not recognize the inhabitants' land ownership certifications and warned that the zone would be occupied by the African American population. After the rebellion, James Hart cited the declaration as a reason for the uprising, saying that the Guyanese government denied the ranchers a 25-year lease request for the land they occupy and feared that farmers arriving from Jamaica and Barbados would take their land, saying that they opposed the transfer of frontier farmlands and gold and diamond mining areas from the indigenous people to African-Guyanese and Indo-Guyanese. The Guyanese government was already in the process of creating a commission for issuing land certificates to indigenous families in the area, though the review of 20,000 square miles (52,000 km^{2}) of land was required.

According to Valerie Hart, the region's population rebelled against the government because their constitutional rights were not respected and because of continuous intimidation and repression directed against them. Valerie was present at the First Conference of Amerindians Leaders, named the "Cabacaburi Congress" in 1968, presenting demands to Burnham who represented the community of around 40,000 indigenous people of the Rupununi district. The movement, according to Venezuelan Navy officer Pedro González Caro, defended the integration of natives to Guyanese society, inconsonant with Burnham's afrocentrist policies. Sanders instead said that the rebellion "was not an Amerindian rising, although many Rupununi Amerindians probably would have approved secession from Guyana."

== Events ==
=== Preparation ===
Planning for the rebellion involved a small group of 100 individuals in order to ensure secrecy. According to Guyanese diplomat Odeen Ishmael, the majority of Amerindians involved in the plot were employees of the ranchers. The New York Times noted in an article discussing the rebellion that "Venezuela has long laid claim" to the territory that rebels attempted to secede from Guyana.

At a 23 December 1968 meeting, rebels finalized plans of a separated Rupununi state. The plan was to control the Rupununi region for three days, which plotters assumed would result with recognition from Venezuela. There were reports that evidence was shared that Venezuela provided rebels with modern armaments according to The New York Times. Other reports, which one rebel named Colin Melville corroborated, said that Venezuela provided training to rebels, flying them into its own territory for exercises on how to use bazookas and machine guns. An aircraft of the Venezuelan Army was reported to have flown into Rupununi and transporting rebels into Venezuela for a week of training before being flown back to the Rupununi region on 1 January 1969.

=== Attack ===
Shortly after rebels reportedly returned from Venezuela, the operation was launched, according to Ishmael. Valerie stayed in the capital of Venezuela, Caracas, while her brothers and the Lawrences participated in the rebellion in Guyana. The command centre of the rebellion was at the Hart ranch, which was about 15 miles (24 km) from the town of Lethem, the principal settlement of the Rupununi region. Rebels armed with machine guns and bazookas began their attacks on Lethem around 11:00am on 2 January 1969, first attacking a police station with about 12 officers present. Five police officers— constables James McKenzie, William Norton, Michael Kendall, Sergeant James Anderson and Inspector Whittington Braithwaite—along with two civilians, Victor Hernandez and Thomas James, were killed while the rebels destroyed buildings belonging to the Guyanese government with bazooka fire. Two other individuals were reported dead, with The New York Times reporting that a total of nine people were killed.

The rebels locked citizens in their homes and blocked airfields in Lethem, Annai, Good Hope, Karanambo and Karasabai, attempting to block staging areas for Guyanese troops. In Annai, around 90 individuals were locked in a slaughterhouse by rebels.

=== Counterattack ===
==== 2 January ====
News about the insurrection reached Georgetown by midday on 2 January, prompting the deployment of policemen and soldiers of the Guyana Defence Force (GDF). In the afternoon, a small group of police and GDF troops arrived at an open airstrip 5 miles (8.0 km) away from Lethem, being fired at by rebels upon their landing. The night of the attack, the Hart family fled to Ciudad Bolívar, before going to Caracas to request military aid from the Venezuelan government; according to Valerie, her goal was, on behalf of the rebels, to create an independent region of Guyana.

==== 3 January ====
In the afternoon, Valerie Hart met in Caracas with the Venezuelan Foreign Affairs Minister Ignacio Iribarren Borges at the Yellow House, the headquarters of the Ministry of Foreign Affairs. In an effort to obtain support, Valerie explained the uprising to Iribarren Borges and said that the rebels had the intention of ceding Guyana's disputed Essequibo territory to Venezuela. Iribarren Borges said that Venezuela was bound to the 1966 Geneva Agreement with the United Kingdom and Guyana, and that Venezuela could not intervene in favour of the rebels even if it wanted to. In a press statement following the meeting, Valerie would state "Venezuela must assert her rightful claim and not only the Rupununi but all the 50,000 square miles of territory of the disputed Essequibo region." Guyanese ambassador to Venezuela Eustace R. Braithwaite later questioned Borges on how Valerie was able to land a private aircraft in Venezuela, immediately meet with Borges and then proceed to hold press events in Caracas; Borges responded saying that he was required to meet with Valerie, that she was personally aided due to humanitarian concerns and denied Venezuelan involvement.

Eighteen hours after the first group of Guyanese troops arrived, a large group of GDF soldiers began their approach on Lethem. As troops approached, the rebels quickly fled and the uprising ended. As the towns of Annai and Good Hope were liberated from rebel groups, tied up policemen were tossed from trucks by dispersing rebel forces.

==== 4 January ====
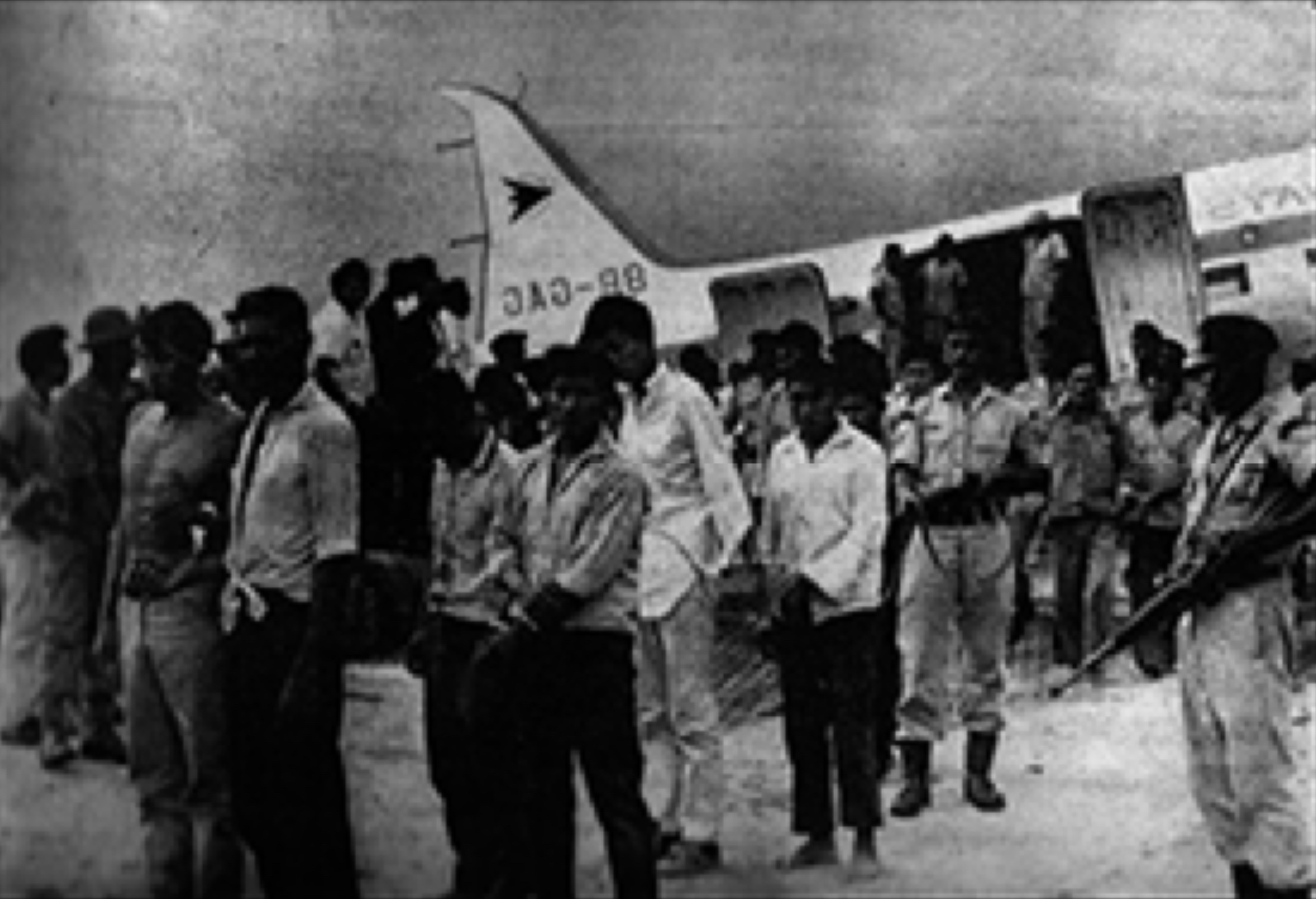
Detained rebels before being flown to Georgetown, Guyana shortly after the failed rebellion

On 4 January, captain Edgar Gavidia Valero flew to Santa Elena de Uairén sent by the Venezuelan government with the orders that the Venezuelan military institutions had to unblock the airfields and start the evacuation of both the Amerindian population and the uprising leaders. Hours afterwards, Guyanese soldiers arrived at the area.

Fighting continued in Annai, and by the end of the day the Guyanese government reported that it had defeated the rebellion.

== Aftermath ==
Members of the failed uprising fled to Venezuela for protection after their plans unravelled, with Hart and her rebels being granted Venezuelan citizenship by birth since they were recognized as being born in the disputed territory that Venezuela recognized as its own and called Guayana Esequiba. The Venezuelan government later settled the leaders of the rebellion into the Gran Sabana region. On 20 January 1969, Valerie Hart met with exiled rebels in Ciudad Bolívar to encourage them to maintain their fighting.

=== Criminal charges ===
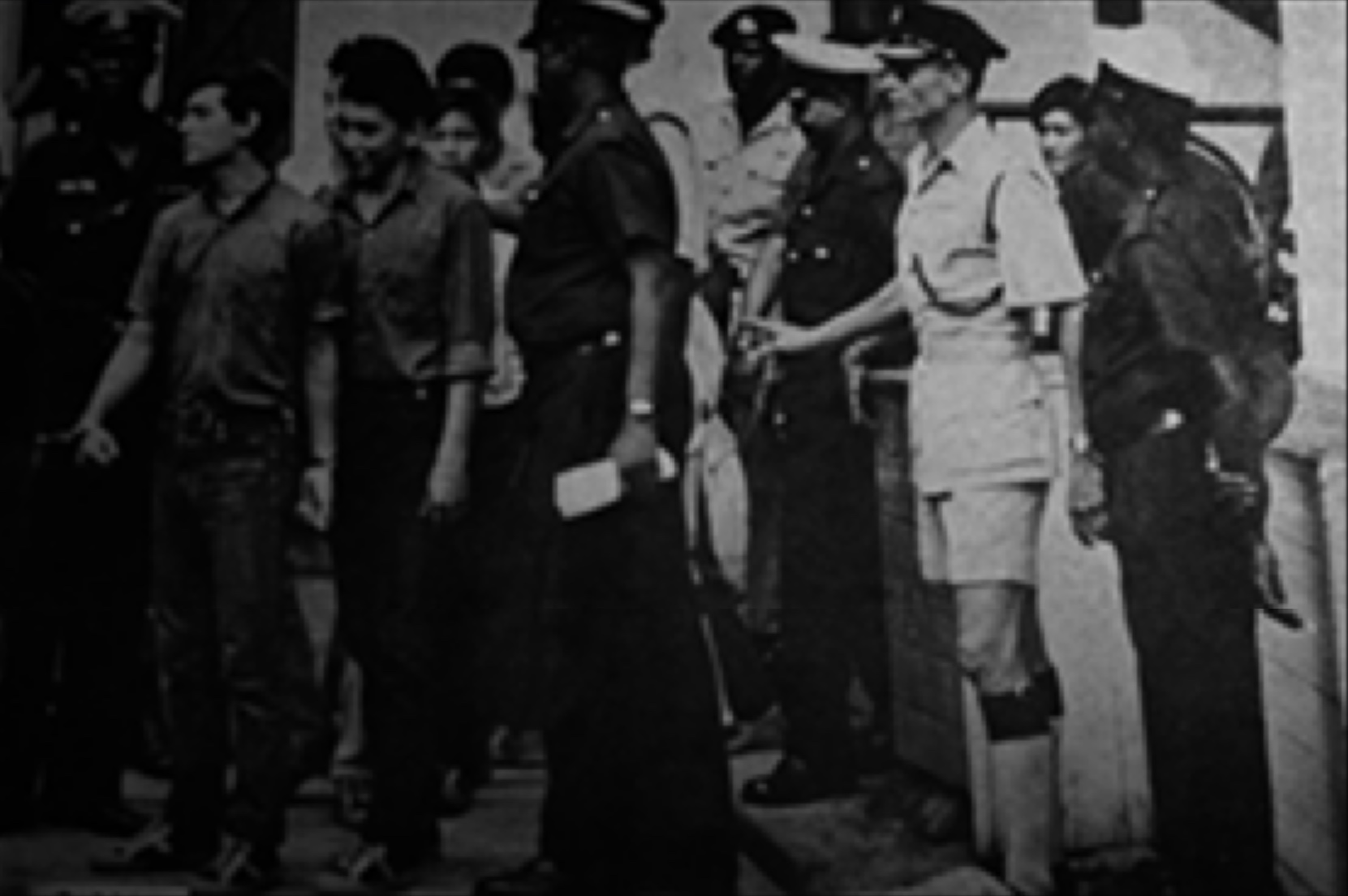
Arrested rebels being presented by Guyanese authorities

About 30 of the rebels were arrested following the uprising. Guyana charged 57 individuals with murder. Of the 28 rebels arrested, 18 were released on 24 January 1969 after having murder charges dropped. The ten remaining individuals were Anaclito Alicio, Ignatius Charlie, Charles Davis, Francis James, Colin Melville, Patrick Melville, Damian Phillips, Aldwyn Singh, Brenton Singh and Handel Singh.

During a jury trial in late 1969, Guyanese prosecutors presented evidence of Venezuelan armaments and oversight of the rebels, though the defence for those accused argued that his clients were under duress when they participated in the rebellion. On 16 January 1970, the verdict of the jury was determined after seven hours of deliberation; seven of the ten accused were found not guilty while a verdict was not presented for Aldwyn, Colin and Patrick. The judge overlooking the trial ordered a retrial, though the three remaining individuals were later acquitted and released.

=== Political responses ===
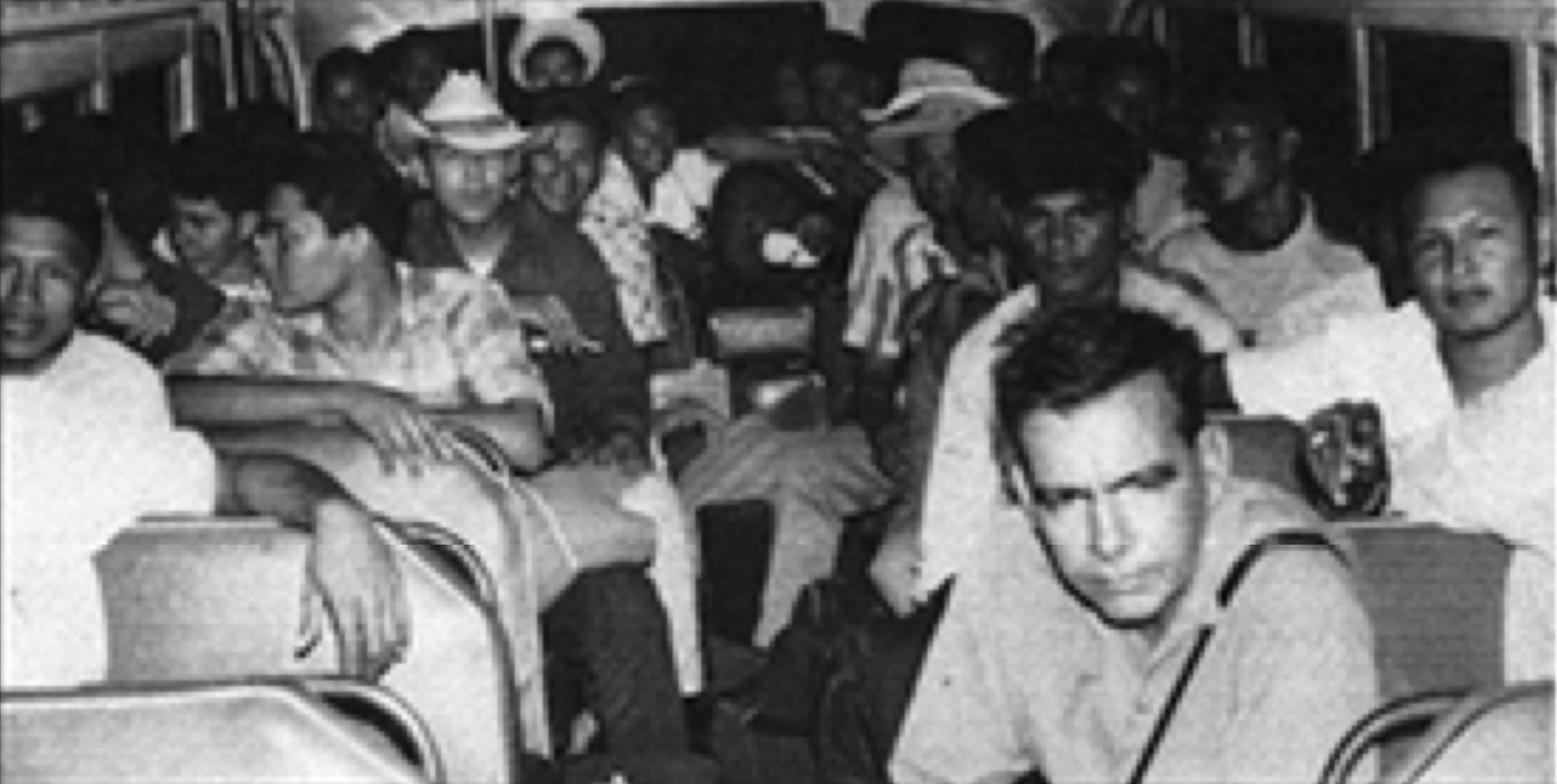
An image provided by the Guyanese government, reportedly showing rebels on a bus in Venezuela

The Guyanese government accused the leaders of the uprising of misleading the region's indigenous people by saying that the government would take their land and said that rebels looted tens of thousands of dollars in the region after detaining local residents. Guyana also accused Venezuela of assisting the rebels, saying that Valerie was provided facilities in Venezuela where she could make radio broadcasts promoting her movement, asking for aid from individuals from the United States.

The government also alleged that 40 rebels were flown by the Venezuelan Army to Santa Elena de Uairén on 24 December 1968, bussed to Santa Teresa the next day where they flew two hours to a military camp for a week of training, before being flown back to the Hart family ranch in Pirara on 1 January 1969. It released images reportedly showing rebels on buses in Venezuela being transported to training facilities, and that Venezuela provided rebels with modern military equipment. Guyanese Prime Minister Forbes Burnham said in a radio broadcast that the rebellion was the "beginning" and that Guyana "must therefore expect further acts of aggression and intimidation from the new imperialism on our western doorstep", describing the rebels as "terrorists" trained by the Venezuelan army. On 5 January, Burnham said that Guyana would present a complaint against Venezuela to the United Nations. Captured rebel Colin Melville stated that rebels trained in Venezuela, including on how to use bazookas and machine guns.

Venezuelan Minister Iribarren Borges strongly denied the accusations that Venezuela assisted the rebels. Venezuelan Interior Affairs Minister Reinaldo Leandro Mora stated that some Guyanese individuals were provided military training in Venezuela after being encouraged by their family members. The minister also said that individuals displaced as a result of the conflict were "a zone that is considered Venezuelan and are being persecuted", that they would be provided jobs and that such individuals would be awarded land. Guyanese minister Ptolemy Reid said that Mora's declaration was further evidence of Venezuela's involvement.

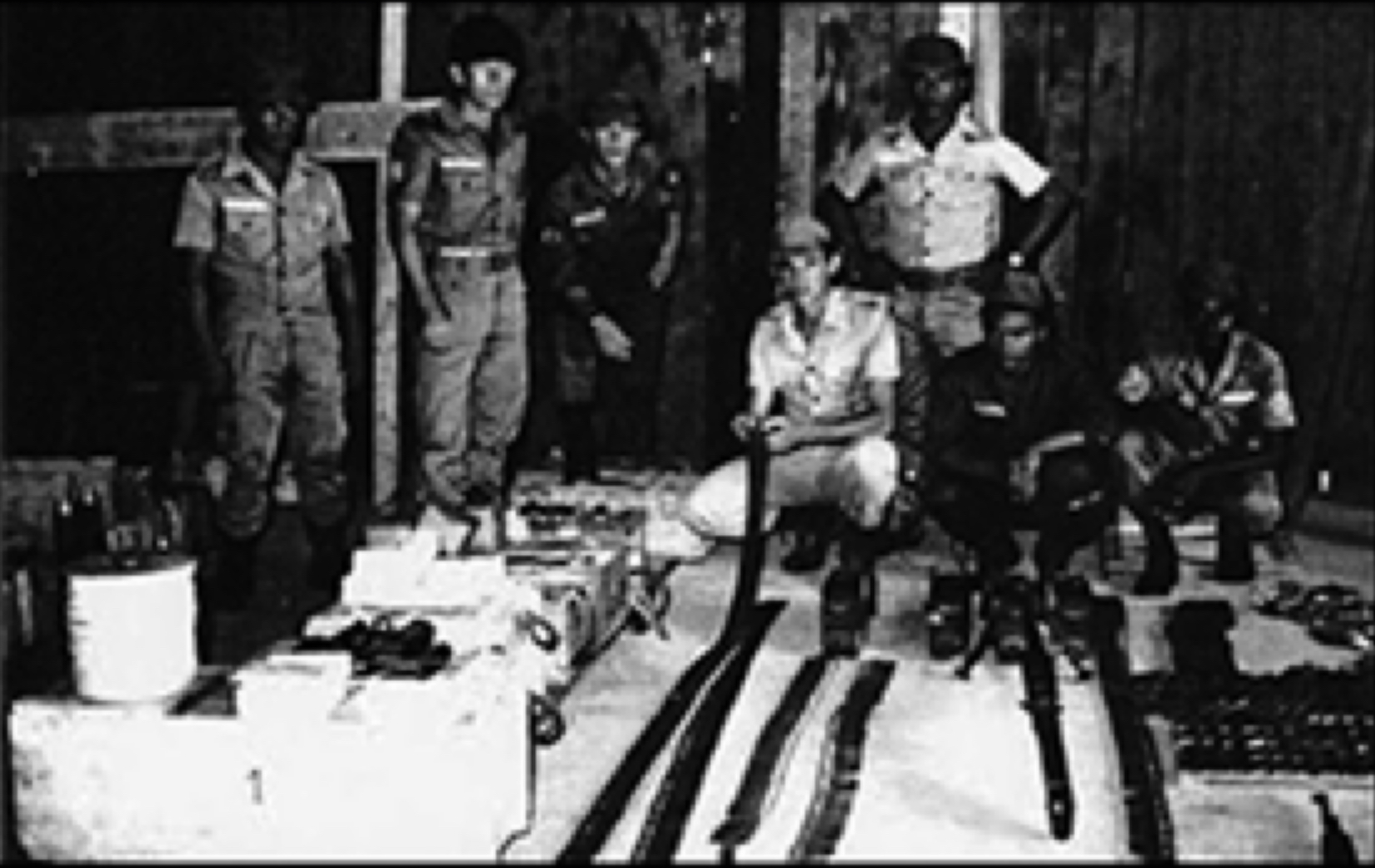
Members of the Brazilian Armed Forces present weapons captured from detained rebels who fled into Brazil

On 6 January 1969, Valerie was expelled from United Force, with the party saying that she was involved "with the rebellion and plot by a foreign power." According to Guyanese diplomat Odeen Ishmael, a Reuters report on 8 January said that Valerie Hart stated "If Venezuela does not intervene right now with troops they would have in their hands a situation similar to the Bay of Pigs".

The Ministry of Foreign Affairs of Brazil released a statement in support of Guyana on 7 January, saying Brazil "has expressed to the Guyanese government in this difficult moment its belief that this bordering and friendly nation will completely overcome the movement that disturbs its internal security and menaces its territorial integrity."

The Guyanese ambassador to the United Nations presented its official letter to Secretary-General of the United Nations, U Thant, on 9 January, saying "The government of Guyana is now in possession of irrefutable proof that the individuals who organized and carried out those crimes were trained for the purpose within the territory of the Republic of Venezuela, and supplied with arms by authorities of the Republic of Venezuela." In March, Guyana instituted a three percent fee on imports to fund defence spending in response to the incident. Between 28 February and 3 March 1969, Burnham held meetings with 160 Amerindians and all Amerindian chiefs (touchaus). The indigenous groups present condemned the actions of Venezuela, with the touchaus declaring in a joint statement that they pledged loyalty to Guyana, that they would never accept Venezuelan territorial claims and that they condemned individuals who collaborated with foreign nations.

On 7 October, Venezuelan ambassador Andrés Aguilar denied allegations that Venezuela assisted rebels at a United Nations meeting.

Venezuelan President Rafael Caldera and Burnham were alarmed at the uprising and vowed to focus their attentions on the issue of the territorial dispute between their two countries, leading to the Port of Spain Protocol in June 1970.

=== Reports of abuses ===
Venezuela and Indigenous activist groups accused Guyanese forces of attacking and killing Amerindians in the region. According to Sanders, "reliable sources" reported two or three Amerindians killed and said that accusations that up to 70 deaths occurred were "rumors." The Guyanese government and its authorities denied any killings.

A pilot of the Guaica airline, who stayed at Lettem, said two C-47 planes landed, Guyanese forces burned houses, tortured inhabitants and raped women. Opposition leader Cheddi Jagan attempted to send two of his Amerindian personnel to the region in order to observe the situation but they were reportedly held at the airfield Lethem by GDF troops and flown back to Georgetown. Bishop of Georgetown R. Lester Guilly travelled to the area and said he witnessed no atrocities. Some Amerindians relocated as a result of the rebellion, with many moving to Brazil.

== See also ==
- Guyana–Venezuela relations
- Tigri Area, another territorial dispute involving Guyana
