= States of Venezuela =

Federated states of the Bolivarian Republic of Venezuela

States, Federal Dependencies and Capital District Estados, Dependencias Federales y Distrito Capital (Spanish)
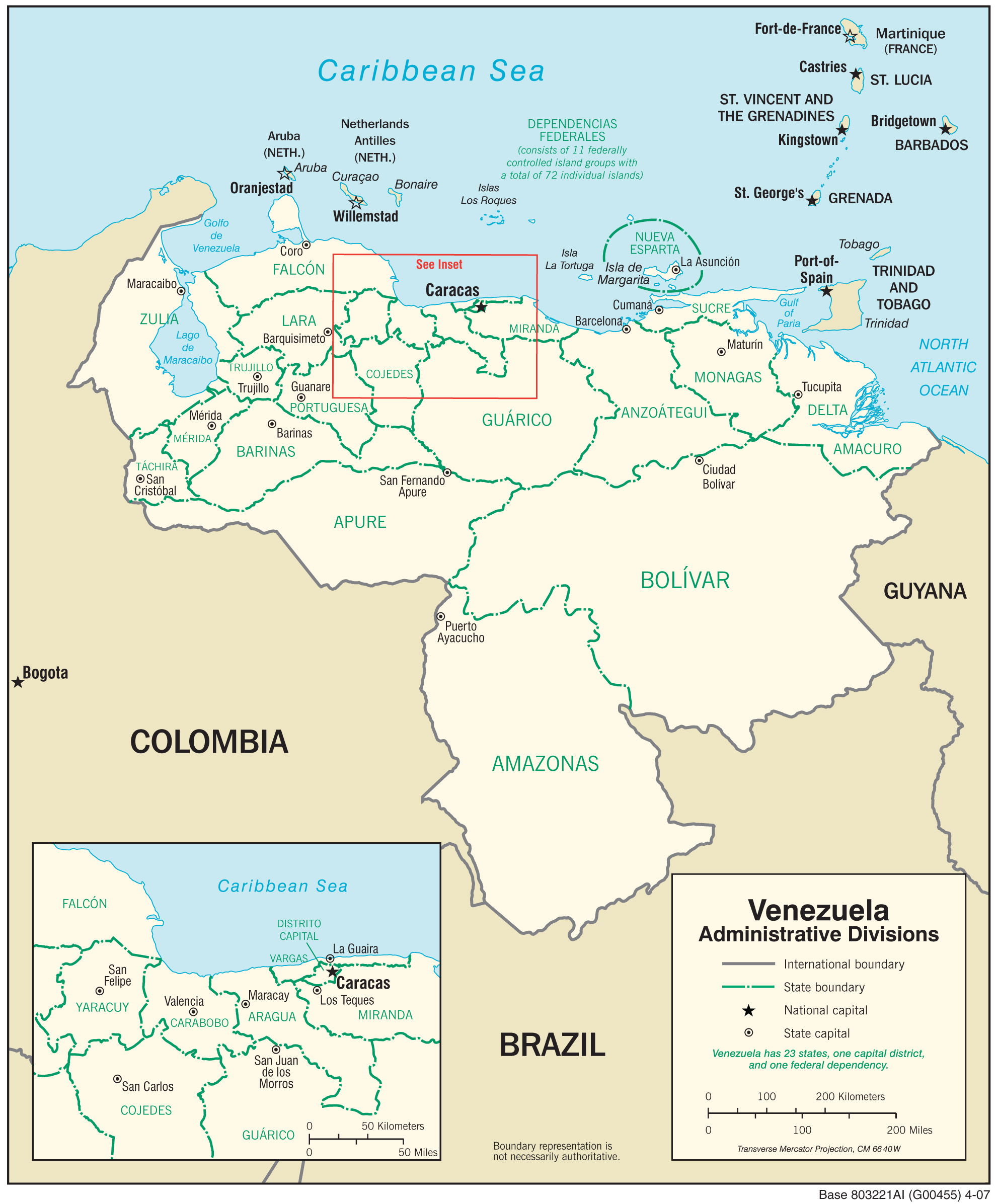
- Category: Federated state
- Location: Bolivarian Republic of Venezuela
- Number: 23 states; 1 Capital District; 1 Federal Dependency
- Populations: 146,480 (Amazonas) – 3,704,404 (Zulia)
- Areas: 1,100 km^{2} (440 sq mi) (Nueva Esparta) – 240,000 km^{2} (92,000 sq mi) (Bolívar)
- Government: State government
- Subdivisions: Municipality Island (Federal Dependencies)

The Bolivarian Republic of Venezuela is a federation made up of twenty-three states (Spanish: estados), a Capital District (Spanish: Distrito Capital) and the Federal Dependencies (Spanish: Dependencias Federales), which consist of many islands and islets in the Caribbean Sea. Venezuela claims the disputed Essequibo territory as one of its states, which it calls Guayana Esequiba, but the territory is controlled by Guyana as part of six of its regions.

The states and territories of Venezuela are usually organized into regions (Spanish: regiones), although these regions are mostly geographical entities rather than administrative entities.

== Historical states ==
Prior to the Federal War (1859–1863), the country was divided into provinces rather than states (see Provinces of Venezuela). The victorious forces were supposed to grant more autonomy to the individual states, but this was not implemented.

From 1863 to the early 1900s there were numerous territorial changes, including the merger and splitting of states, but from then until the 1990s the states were left unchanged. States that existed during this time included Guzmán Blanco State (1873–1889). Originally a renamed Aragua State, in 1881 the states of Miranda, Guárico, Nueva Esparta and the Vargas department of the Federal District were merged into the state. This was part of a territorial reorganisation reducing the number of states from 20 to 9, which was reversed in 1901.

The 1990s saw the creation of three new states: Delta Amacuro (1991), Amazonas (1994), and Vargas (1998, renamed La Guaira in 2019).

== Proposed states ==
On 5 December 2023, following a referendum held two days earlier, Venezuelan president Nicolás Maduro published a new map showing the claimed region of Guayana Esequiba as part of Venezuela. He urged legislators to create a law which would establish a new state covering the disputed region. The Venezuelan referendum on annexing the area led to a diplomatic crisis with Guyana.

== Regions ==
Venezuela's territory is generally divided into nine geographical regions, which are mostly used for geographical, cultural and planning purposes but do not have active administrative bodies.

Region	Spanish	States
Andean	Andina	Mérida, Táchira, Trujillo
Capital	Capital	Caracas (Capital District), La Guaira, Miranda
Central	Centro	Aragua, Carabobo
Central-Western	Centro-Occidente	Falcón, Lara, Yaracuy
Guayana	Guayana	Amazonas, Bolívar, Delta Amacuro
Insular	Insular	Nueva Esparta, Federal Dependencies
Los Llanos	Los Llanos	Apure, Barinas, Cojedes, Guárico, Portuguesa
Eastern	Oriental	Anzoátegui, Monagas, Sucre
Zulian	Zulia	Zulia

== States ==
Below is a list of the 23 states of Venezuela. The states are listed along with their correspondent emblems, data and location.

Flag	State	Capital	Largest city	Population (2021)	Population (2011)	Area (km^{2})	Density per km^{2} (2021)	Density per km^{2} (2011)	Region	Map
	Amazonas	Puerto Ayacucho		180,000	146,480	180,145	0.99	0.81	Guayana	
	Anzoátegui	Barcelona		1,570,000	1,469,747	43,300	36.26	33.94	Eastern	
	Apure	San Fernando de Apure		570,000	459,025	76,500	7.45	6.00	Llanos	
	Aragua	Maracay		1,640,000	1,630,308	7,014	233.82	232.44	Central	
	Barinas	Barinas		1,030,000	916,264	35,200	23.58	23.19	Andean	
	Bolívar	Ciudad Bolívar	Ciudad Guayana	1,730,000	1,410,964	238,000	7.27	5.93	Guayana	
	Carabobo	Valencia		2,240,000	2,245,744	4,650	481.72	482.96	Central	
	Cojedes	San Carlos		330,000	323,165	14,800	22.29	21.84	Central	
	Delta Amacuro	Tucupita		190,000	167,676	40,200	4.72	4.17	Guayana	
	Falcón	Coro	Punto Fijo	990,000	902,847	24,800	39.92	36.41	Central-Western	
	Guárico	San Juan de los Morros	Calabozo	830,000	747,739	64,986	12.77	11.51	Llanos	
	La Guaira	La Guaira		340,000	352,920	1,496	227.27	235.91	Capital	
	Lara	Barquisimeto		1,870,000	1,774,867	19,800	94.44	89.64	Central-Western	
	Mérida	Mérida		880,000	828,592	11,300	77.88	73.33	Andean	
	Miranda	Los Teques		2,970,000	2,675,165	7,950	373.58	336.50	Capital	
	Monagas	Maturín		930,000	905,443	28,930	32.15	31.30	Eastern	
	Nueva Esparta	La Asunción	Porlamar	570,000	491,610	1,150	495.65	427.90	Insular	
	Portuguesa	Guanare	Acarigua	930,000	876,496	15,200	61.18	57.66	Central-Western	
	Sucre	Cumaná		990,000	896,291	11,800	83.90	75.96	Eastern	
	Táchira	San Cristóbal		1,030,000	1,168,908	11,100	92.79	105.31	Andean	
	Trujillo	Trujillo	Valera	770,000	686,367	7,400	104.05	92.75	Andean	
	Yaracuy	San Felipe		670,000	600,852	7,100	94.37	84.63	Central-Western	
	Zulia	Maracaibo		3,830,000	3,704,404	63,100	60.70	58.71	Zulian	
Disputed state whose territory is controlled by Guyana:
	Guayana Esequiba	Tumeremo (administrative center)		128,000	125,000	159,542	0.8	0.78	Guayana	

=== By Human Development Index ===
HDI of Venezuelan states in 2017

Rank	State	HDI (2023)
High human development
1	Capital District	0.753
2	Miranda	0.740
3	Aragua	0.734
4	Carabobo	0.729
5	La Guaira	0.729
6	Nueva Esparta	0.728
7	Anzoátegui	0.719
8	Bolívar	0.712
—	Venezuela	0.709
9	Táchira	0.706
10	Monagas	0.700
Medium human development
11	Falcón	0.698
12	Mérida	0.698
13	Zulia	0.694
14	Delta Amacuro	0.693
15	Barinas	0.688
16	Lara	0.688
17	Cojedes	0.686
18	Sucre	0.679
19	Trujillo	0.678
20	Yaracuy	0.676
21	Guárico	0.671
22	Portuguesa	0.657
23	Amazonas	0.657
24	Apure	0.638

== Special status areas ==
Flag	State	Capital	Population (2011)	Area (km^{2})	Region	Map
	Capital District	Caracas	1,943,901	433	Capital	
	Federal Dependencies	Los Roques	2,155	342	Insular	

== State name etymologies ==
Several states are named for historical figures:

- Anzoátegui for José Antonio Anzoátegui
- Bolívar for Simón Bolívar
- Falcón for Juan Crisóstomo Falcón
- Lara for Jacinto Lara
- Miranda for Francisco de Miranda
- Monagas for José Tadeo Monagas and José Gregorio Monagas
- Sucre for Antonio José de Sucre

Several states are named for natural features:

- Amazonas is named for the Amazon rainforest
- Apure is named for the Apure River
- Aragua for the Aragua River
- Cojedes for the Cojedes River
- Delta Amacuro for the river delta of the Orinoco, and for the Amacuro River
- Guárico for the Guárico River
- Portuguesa for the Portuguesa River
- Táchira for the Táchira River
- Yaracuy for the Yaracuy River
- Zulia for the Zulia River, its name meaning "navigable river" in Chibcha language

Other naming origins:

- Barinas, named after the indigenous ethnic group in the area
- Carabobo, from the local Arawaco language expression Karau-bo-bo, meaning "Savannah of a lot of Ravines"
- Caracas, named for the Caracas indigenous group
- La Guaira, for the capital city, La Guaira, named after an indigenous Carib settlement called Huaira
- Mérida, for the capital city, Mérida, itself named for Mérida in Spain
- Nueva Esparta ("New Sparta") is named for the heroism shown by its inhabitants during the Venezuelan War of Independence, deemed similar to that of the Spartan soldiers of Ancient Greece.
- Trujillo, for the capital city, Trujillo, itself named for Trujillo in Spain

== See also ==
- ISO 3166-2:VE
- Administrative divisions of Venezuela
- Demographics of Venezuela
- List of cities and towns in Venezuela

== Bibliography ==
- Some information was retrieved from the Venezuelan National Institute of Statistics.
