= Amacuro =

Amacuro may refer to:

- Amacuro River
- Delta Amacuro State
