= Guyana–Venezuela territorial dispute =

Territorial dispute between Guyana and Venezuela

Coordinates: 6.3°N 59.7°W

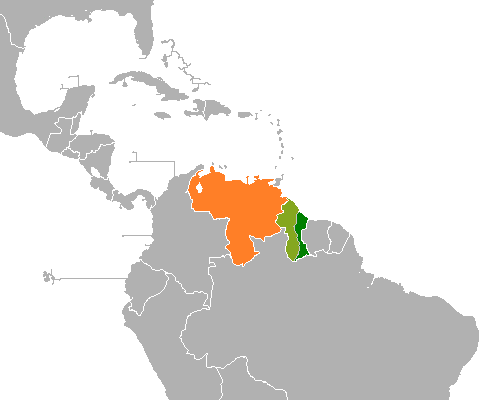
The Essequibo is in light green, with the rest of Guyana shown in dark green and Venezuela in orange.

There is an ongoing territorial dispute between Guyana and Venezuela over the Essequibo region (Spanish: Guayana Esequiba; Spanish pronunciation: [ɡwaˈʝana eseˈkiβa]), a 159,500 km^{2} (61,600 sq mi) area west of the Essequibo River and even parts south of it. The territory, excluding the Venezuelan-controlled Ankoko Island, is controlled by Guyana as part of six of its regions, (Note: Barima-Waini, Pomeroon-Supenaam, Essequibo Islands-West Demerara, Cuyuni-Mazaruni, Potaro-Siparuni and Upper Takutu-Upper Essequibo) based on the 1899 Paris Arbitral Award. It is also claimed by Venezuela as the Guayana Esequiba State. The boundary dispute, also known as the Essequibo conflict, which began under the colonial powers (Spain in the case of Venezuela, and the Netherlands and the United Kingdom in the case of Guyana) and has persisted following the independence of Gran Colombia and Guyana.

As part of the Anglo-Dutch Treaty of 1814, arising from the Napoleonic Wars, the Netherlands ceded Essequibo to Great Britain. In 1835, the UK government commissioned German-born explorer and naturalist Robert Hermann Schomburgk to survey British Guiana's boundaries as the 1814 treaty did not define the western border. This survey resulted in what came to be known as the "Schomburgk Line", which was rejected by Venezuelan and British governments, as even the extended Schomburgk Line did not include the entire Cuyuní River basin which was claimed by Britain. After negotiations in the 1850s, the countries were unable to come to a settlement. Tensions worsened after the discovery of gold mines in the region in 1876, culminating with Venezuelan president Antonio Guzmán Blanco severing diplomatic relations with the United Kingdom in 1887. Venezuela then called upon the Monroe Doctrine, asking the USA to intervene on Venezuela's behalf. Under threat of a possible invasion from the United States, the United Kingdom agreed to an international arbitration by means of the 1897 Treaty of Washington. The arbitration resulted in the Paris Arbitral Award in 1899, a ruling largely in favour of Britain. There was little protest from Venezuela, likely due to outstanding loans to international allies and internal political upheaval.

The matter was considered settled until 1949, when a posthumous memorandum by Severo Mallet-Prevost was published in the American Journal of International Law. Mallet-Prevost had been part of the US–Venezuela delegation in the arbitration. His letter stated that the Arbitral Award resulted from the pressure by the Tribunal President Friedrich Martens and a political deal between Russia and Britain. In 1961, the UK granted British Guiana internal self-government. In 1962, Venezuela brought the memorandum and territorial dispute to the United Nations, which resulted in the Geneva Agreement, signed by Venezuela, the UK, and British Guiana on February 17, 1966. British Guiana achieved independence from the UK on May 26, 1966. Five months later, Venezuelan troops crossed the international border and seized Ankoko Island.

The 1966 Geneva Agreement stipulates that the parties will agree to find a "practical, peaceful, and satisfactory solution" to the dispute. Should there be a stalemate, according to the treaty, the decision as to the means of settlement is to be referred to an "appropriate international organ" or, failing agreement on this point, to the secretary-general of the United Nations. The secretary-general referred the entire matter to the International Court of Justice (ICJ). On 18 December 2020, the ICJ accepted the case submitted by Guyana to settle the dispute. In December 2023, Venezuela held a referendum asking the Venezuelan electorate whether the region should become a state of Venezuela and its population become citizens, where it declared that the results showed overwhelming support for such action. No vote was held in the disputed region.

Currently, Venezuela claims all of the land west of the Essequibo River, which it refers to as Zona en Reclamación or Zone in Reclamation. Historically, this did not include the tributaries of the Amazon River and the Pirara area, which were only ceded to British Guiana in 1904 during arbitration with Brazil. The Northwestern border of the Essequibo follows the 1905 border as established by the British-Venezuelan Mixed Boundary Commission, in accordance with the Arbitral Award of 3 October 1899. Venezuela currently seeks to abrogate the legal borders and currently agrees only to the Essequibo River boundary.

In March 2024, Venezuela passed a law that designates Essequibo as a new state of Venezuela, governed from the city of Tumeremo. The law was submitted to the Supreme Court to validate its constitutionality.

== Demographics ==
In 2023, the population of Essequibo was estimated to be around 125,000 inhabitants, 15.8% of the total population of Guyana.

== Colonial history ==
Before the arrival of European colonizers, the Guianas were populated by different groups of indigenous peoples. The Warao people are considered to be the first inhabitants of Guyana, followed by the Lokono and Kalina people. The native tribes of the Northern Amazon are most closely related to the natives of the Caribbean. Most evidence suggests that the Lokono immigrated from the Orinoco and Essequibo River Basins in Venezuela and Guiana into the northern islands, and were then supplanted by more warlike tribes of Carib Indians, who departed from these same river valleys a few centuries later.

Spain had already claimed ownership of this region, as per the papal bull issued by Pope Alexander VI and the Treaty of Tordesillas. The treaty was not signed nor recognized by other colonial nations, such as the Dutch or the English which disputed papal authority and continued to colonize the area, nor was it recognized by most indigenous peoples of the Americas.

=== 15th century ===
The first European encounter of the region was by the ships of Juan de Esquivel, deputy of Don Diego Columbus, son of Christopher Columbus, in 1498. The region was named after Esquivel. In 1499, Amerigo Vespucci and Alonso de Ojeda explored the mouths of the Orinoco, and reportedly were the first Europeans to explore the Essequibo.

=== 16th century ===
In 1581, on the banks of the Pomeroon River, Dutch colonists from Zeeland established a trading post and were colonizing the land situated west of the Essequibo. The Pomeroon colony was incorporated into the Essequibo colony and became a major destination for trade for the Dutch colonialists, before control was transferred to the British.

Dutch colonisation of the Guianas occurred primarily between the mouths of the Orinoco River in the west and the Amazon River to the east. Their presence in the Guianas was noted by the late 1500s, though many documents of early Dutch discoveries in the region were destroyed. The Dutch were present as far west as the Araya Peninsula in Venezuela utilising salt pans in the area. By the 1570s, it was reported that the Dutch were commencing trade in the Guianas, but little evidence of this exists. At the time, neither the Portuguese nor the Spanish had made any establishments in the area. A Dutch fort was built in 1596 at the mouth of the Essequibo River on an island, which was destroyed by the Spanish later that year.

In 1597, Dutch interest in travelling to the Guianas became common following the publication of The Discovery of Guiana by Sir Walter Raleigh. On 3 December 1597, a Dutch expedition left Brielle and travelled the coasts between the Amazon and Orinoco. The report, written by A. Cabeljau and described as having "more realistic information about the region" than that of Raleigh, showed how the Dutch had travelled the Orinoco and Caroní River, discovering dozens of rivers and other previously unknown lands. Cabeljau wrote of good relations with the natives and that the Spanish were friendly when they encountered them in San Tomé. By 1598, Dutch ships frequented Guiana to establish settlements.

=== 17th century ===
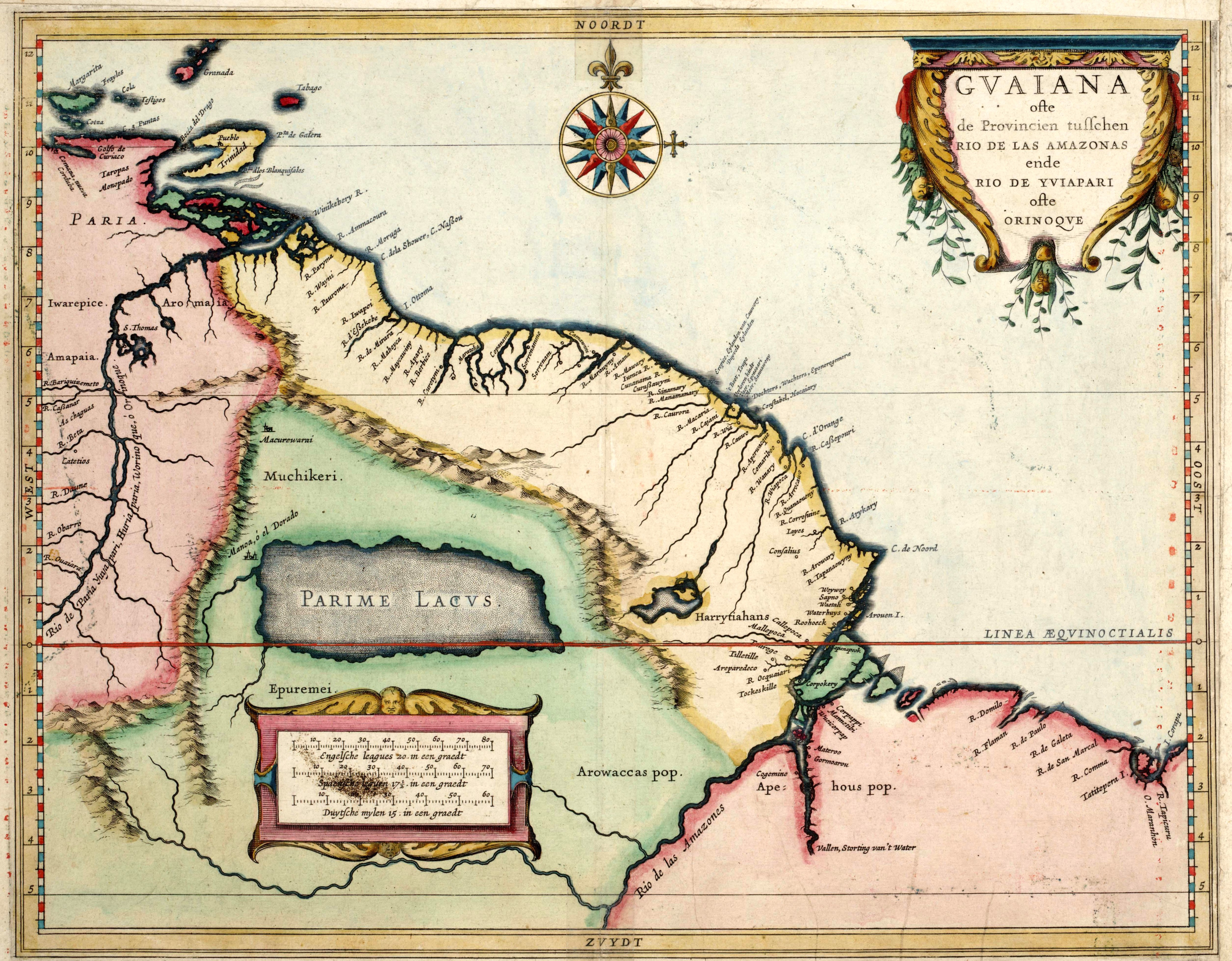
A 1625 map by Hessel Gerritsz, showing Dutch territory, in yellow, ranging from the Orinoco River to the Amazon River

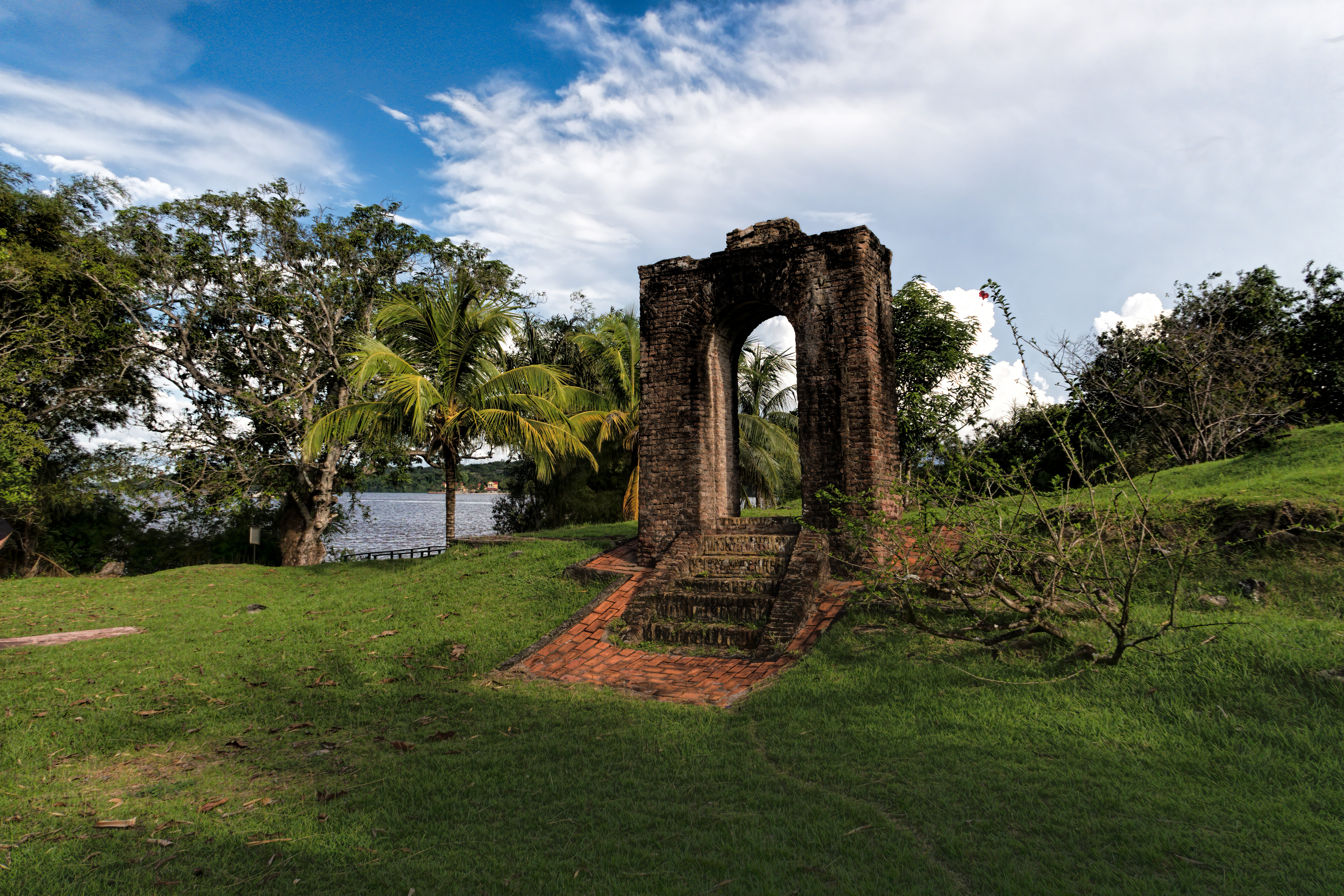
Ruins of Fort Kyk-Over-Al, constructed by the Dutch in 1616

Another Dutch fort supported by indigenous groups was established at the mouth of the Essequibo River in 1613, which was destroyed by the Spanish in November 1613. In 1616, Dutch ship captain Aert Adriaenszoon Groenewegen established Fort Kyk-Over-Al located 20 miles (32 km) down the Essequibo River, where he married the daughter of an indigenous chief, controlling the Dutch colony for nearly fifty years until his death in 1664.

To protect the Araya salt flats, the "white gold" of the time, from English, French, and Dutch incursions, the Spanish Crown ordered the construction of a military fortress, which they finished building at the beginning of the year 1625. It was given the name of Real Fuerza de Santiago de Arroyo de Araya. Santiago, from the patron of Spain; Arroyo, from the governor Diego de Arroyo Daza and Araya, from the name of the place. It was the first important fortress of the captaincy of Venezuela. As the years passed, the Spanish Crown was concerned about the high cost of maintaining the fortress. In 1720 it had 246 people, and a budget of 31,923 strong pesos per year to which is added the serious damage to the structure caused by the earthquake in 1684 and later the devastating effects of the hurricane that flooded the salt flats in 1725.

By 1637, the Spanish wrote that, "In those three settlements of Amacuro, Essequibo and Berbis the [Dutch] have many people... all the Aruacs and Caribs are allied with him", with later reports of the Dutch building forts from Cape North at the Amazon River to the opening of the Orinoco River. In 1639, the Spanish stated that the Dutch in Essequibo "were further protected by 10,000 to 12,000 Caribs in the vicinity of which they frequent, and who are their allies". Captain Groenewegen was recognised as keeping both the Spanish and Portuguese from settling in the area.

In a speech to the Parliament of England that took place on 21 January 1644, English settlers who had explored the Guianas stated that the Dutch, English, and Spanish had long sought to find El Dorado in the region. The English said that the Dutch were experienced with travelling the Orinoco River for many years. Due to the skillful travel of the Dutch on the Orinoco, the Spanish would later encounter the Dutch and prohibit them from travelling the river.

In 1648 Spain signed the Peace of Münster with the Dutch Republic, whereby Spain recognised the Republic's independence and also small Dutch possessions located east of the Essequibo River, which had been founded by the Dutch Republic before it was recognised by Spain. However, a few decades after the Peace of Münster, the Dutch began to spread gradually west of the Essequibo River, inside the Spanish Guayana Province. These new settlements were regularly contested and destroyed by the Spanish authorities.

Serious Dutch colonisation west of the Essequibo began in the early 1650s, while the colony of Pomeroon was being established between the Moruka River and Pomeroon River. Many of these colonists were Dutch-Brazilian Jews who had left Pernambuco. In 1673, Dutch settlements were established as far as the Barima River.

=== 18th century ===
A 1775 map of the Americas by Rigobert Bonne.

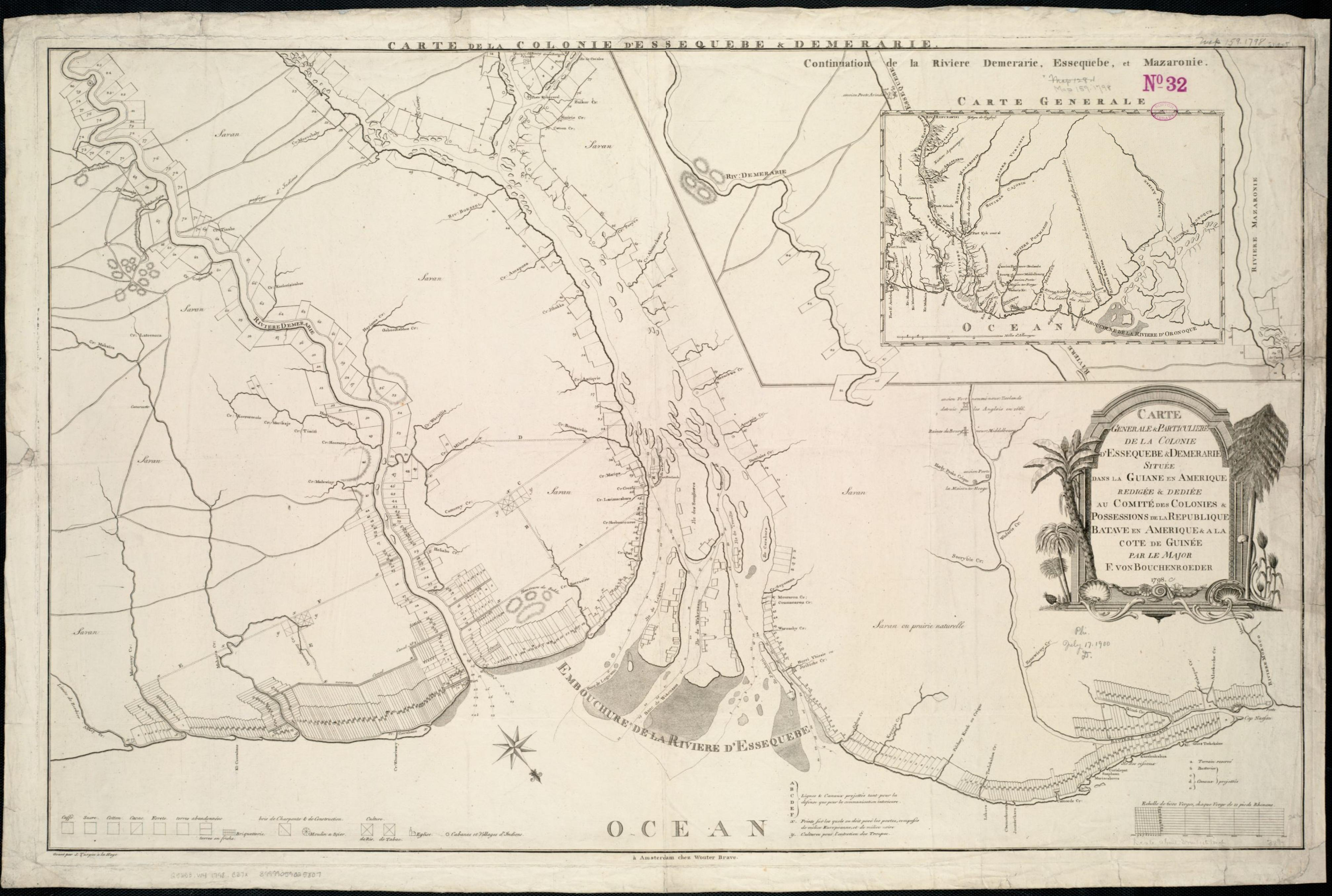
Map of Dutch colonies of Essequibo and Demerara in 1798.

In 1732, the Swedes made an attempt to settle between the Low Orinoco and the Barima River. Nevertheless, by 1737 Major Sergeant Carlos Francisco de Sucre y Pardo (Antonio de Sucre's grandfather) expelled them from the forts at Barima, preventing the Swedish attempt at colonization for the time being. By 1745, the Dutch had several territories in the region, including Essequibo, Demerara, Berbice, and Surinam. Dutch settlements were also established on the Cuyuni River, Caroní River and Moruka River. Domingos, Bandeira Jerónimo and Roque described Essequibo and Demerara as "sophisticated and promising slave colonies".

When Spain created the Captaincy General of Venezuela in 1777 under Charles III, the Essequibo River was restated as the natural border between Spanish territory and the Dutch colony of Essequibo.

Dutch slaves in Essequibo and Demerara recognised the Orinoco River as the boundary between Spanish and Dutch Guiana, with slaves often attempting to cross the Orinoco to live with increased, though limited, liberties in Spanish Guiana.

== 19th century ==
Under the Anglo-Dutch Treaty of 1814, the Dutch colonies of Demerara, Berbice and Essequibo were transferred to the United Kingdom. By this time, the Dutch had defended the territory from the British, French, and Spanish for nearly two centuries, often allying with natives in the region who provided intelligence about Spanish incursions and escaped slaves. According to scholar Allan Brewer Carías, the Anglo-Dutch Treaty of 1814 did not establish a western border of what would later be known as the British Guiana, which is why explorer Robert Schomburgk would later be commissioned to draw a border.

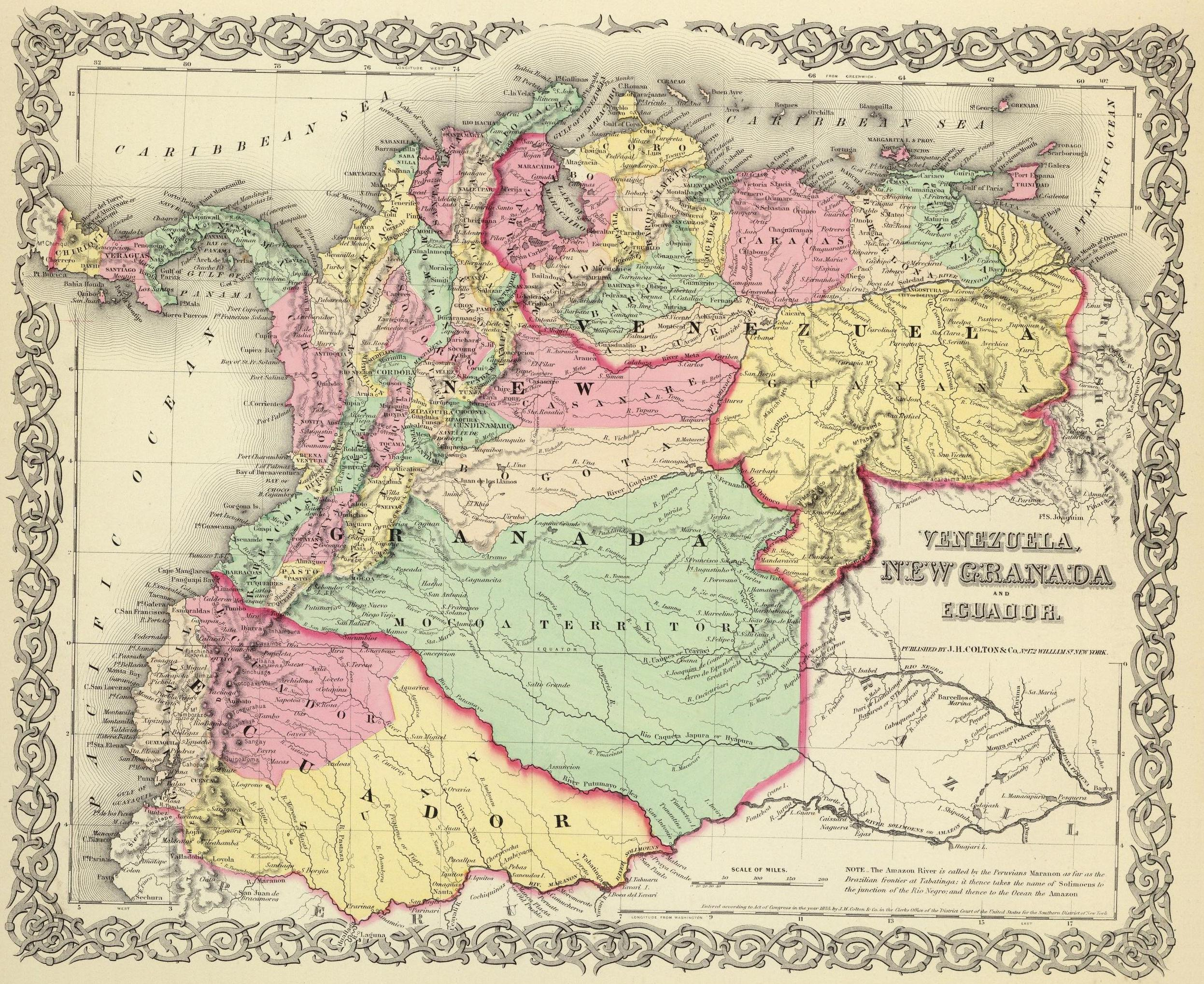
An 1855 map of Venezuela including British Guayana, the entire Essequibo region, and New Granada.

Following the establishment of Gran Colombia in 1819, territorial disputes began between Gran Colombia, later Venezuela, and the British. In 1822 José Rafael Revenga, Minister Plenipotentiary of Gran Colombia to Britain, complained to the British government at the direction of Simón Bolívar about the presence of British settlers in territory claimed by Venezuela: "The colonists of Demerara and Berbice have usurped a large portion of land, which according to recent treaties between Spain and Holland, belongs to our country at the west of Essequibo River. It is absolutely essential that these settlers be put under the jurisdiction and obedience to our laws, or be withdrawn to their former possessions."

In 1824 Venezuela appointed Manuel José Hurtado as its new Ambassador to Britain. He officially presented to the British government the Venezuelan claim to the border at the Essequibo River, which was not objected to by Britain. However, the British government continued to promote colonization of territory west of the Essequibo River in succeeding years. In 1831, Britain merged the former Dutch territories of Berbice, Demerara, and Essequibo into a single colony, British Guiana.

=== Schomburgk Line ===
Under the aegis of the Royal Geographical Society, the German-born explorer and naturalist Robert Hermann Schomburgk conducted botanical and geographical exploration of British Guiana in 1835. This resulted in a sketch of the territory with a line marking what he believed to be the western boundary claimed by the Dutch. As a result of this, he was commissioned in 1840 by the British government to survey Guiana's boundaries. This survey resulted in what came to be known as the "Schomburgk Line". The line went well beyond the area of British occupation and gave British Guiana control of the mouth of the Orinoco River. According to Schomburgk, it did not contain all the area that Britain might legitimately claim.

Venezuela disputed Schomburgk's placing of border markers at the Orinoco River, and in 1844 claimed all of Guiana west of the Essequibo River. In the same year, a British proposal to Venezuela to modify the border to give Venezuela full control of the Orinoco River mouth and adjacent territory was ignored. In 1850, Britain and Venezuela reached an agreement whereby they accepted not to colonise the disputed territory, although it was not established where this territory began and ended.

Schomburgk's initial sketch, which were published in 1840, was the only version of the "Schomburgk Line" published until 1886, which led to later accusations by US President Grover Cleveland that the line had been extended "in some mysterious way".

=== Gold discoveries ===
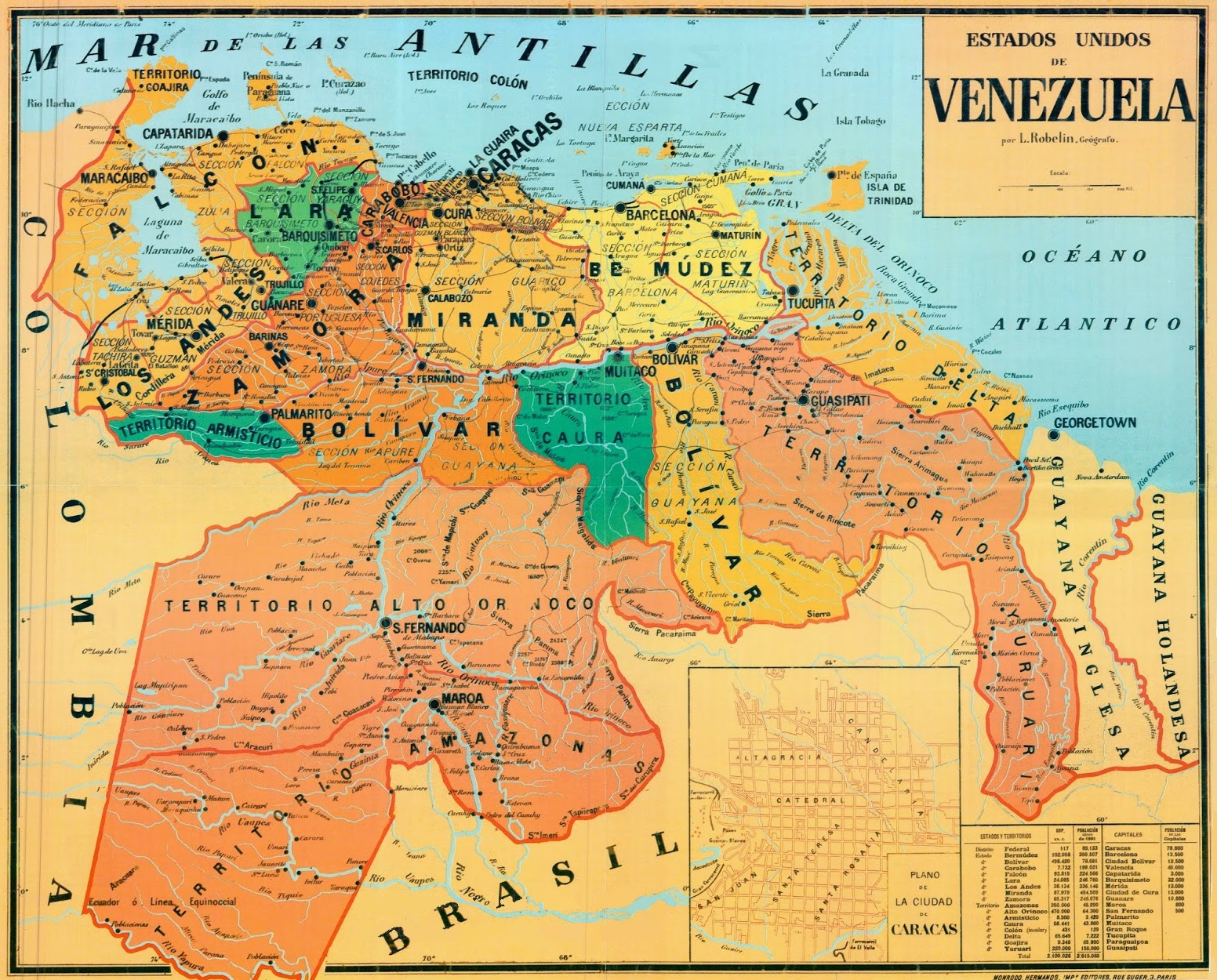
A map of the United States of Venezuela by L. Robelin 1890, which shows the Venezuelan historical claim to the region.

The dispute went unmentioned for many years until gold was discovered in the region, which disrupted relations between the United Kingdom and Venezuela. In 1876, gold mines inhabited mainly by English-speaking people had been established in the Cuyuni basin, which was Venezuelan territory beyond the Schomburgk line but within the area Schomburgk thought Britain could claim. That year, Venezuela reiterated its claim up to the Essequibo River, to which the British responded with a counterclaim including the entire Cuyuni basin, although this was a paper claim the British never intended to pursue.

In October 1886 Britain declared the Schomburgk Line the provisional frontier of British Guiana, and in February 1887 Venezuela severed diplomatic relations. In 1894, Venezuela appealed to the United States to intervene, citing the Monroe Doctrine as justification. The United States did not want to get involved, only going as far as suggesting the possibility of arbitration.

=== Venezuela crisis of 1895 ===
The longstanding dispute became a diplomatic crisis in 1895 when Venezuela hired William Lindsay Scruggs as its lobbyist in Washington, D.C. Scruggs took up Venezuela's argument that British action violated the Monroe Doctrine. Scruggs used his influence to get the US government to accept this claim and get involved.

President Grover Cleveland adopted a broad interpretation of the Doctrine that did not just simply forbid new European colonies but declared an American interest in any matter within the hemisphere.

British Prime Minister Lord Salisbury and British ambassador to the US Lord Pauncefote both misjudged the importance the American government placed on the dispute. The key issue in the crisis became Britain's refusal to include the territory east of the Schomburgk Line in the proposed international arbitration. Ultimately Britain backed down and tacitly accepted the US right to intervene under the Monroe Doctrine. This US intervention forced Britain to accept arbitration of the entire disputed territory.

=== Treaty of Washington and arbitration ===
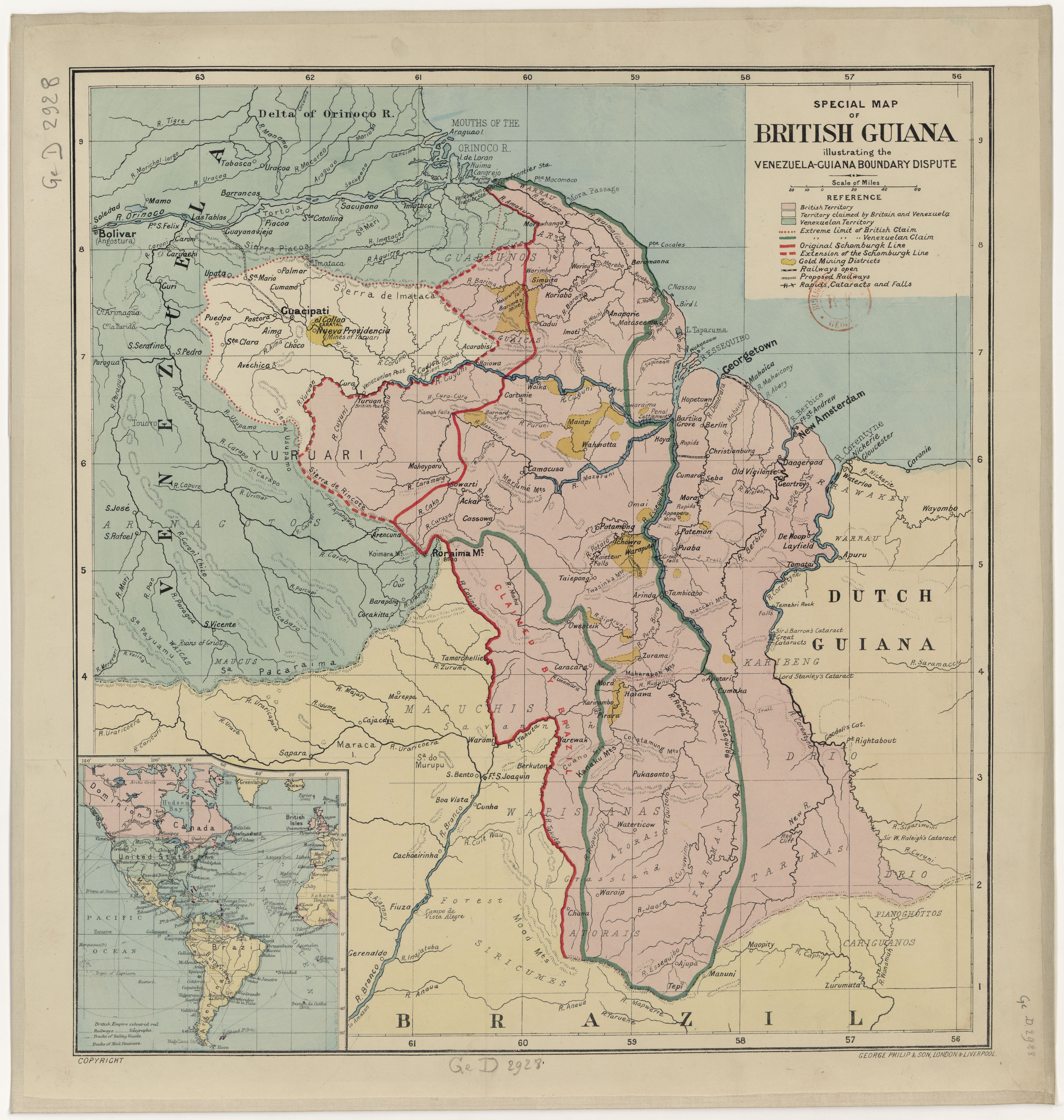
An 1897 map showing territorial claims by British Guiana, including western boundary ceded to Venezuela

The Treaty of Arbitration between the UK and Venezuela was signed in Washington on 2 February 1897. This treaty specifically stipulated the legal framework for the arbitration, its first article stating that "An Arbitral Tribunal shall be immediately appointed to determine the boundary-line between the Colony of British Guiana and the United States of Venezuela."

The Treaty provided the legal framework, procedures, and conditions for the Tribunal to solve the issue and reach to determine a border. Its third article established that "The Tribunal shall investigate and ascertain the extent of the territories belonging to, or that might lawfully be claimed by the United Netherlands or by the Kingdom of Spain respectively at the time of the acquisition by Great Britain of the Colony of British Guiana, and shall determine the boundary line between the Colony of British Guiana and the United States of Venezuela". The Treaty also established the rules and principles to be followed by the Tribunal to draw the borderline.

With the Treaty of Washington, Great Britain and Venezuela both agreed that the arbitral ruling in Paris would be a "full, perfect, and final settlement" (Article XIII) to the border dispute.

Venezuela argued that Spain–whose territory they had acquired–controlled land from the Orinoco River to the Amazon River in present-day Brazil. Spain, according to Venezuela, only designated its claimed Guiana territory to the Dutch, which did not include much land within the disputed territory. Meanwhile, Britain, who had acquired the Dutch territory, stated that the disputed Guiana region was not Spanish because it was so remote and uncontrolled, explaining that the original natives in the land had shared the territory's land with the Dutch instead of the Spanish and were thus under Dutch and British influence.

As an early postwar effort at diplomacy, in January 1899 the United States sent the cruiser USS Wilmington up Orinoco River to signal its readiness to defend American commercial interests.

In April 1899 the rival claims were presented in Paris to a tribunal of five arbitrators: two from Britain, two from the US (representing Venezuela's interest), and one from Russia, who were presumed neutral. The U.S. represented Venezuela on the panel in part because the Venezuelan government had broken off diplomatic relations with Britain.

On 3 October 1899 the Tribunal ruled largely in favour of Britain. The Schomburgk Line was, with two deviations, established as the border between British Guiana and Venezuela. One deviation was that Venezuela received Barima Point at the mouth of the Orinoco, giving it undisputed control of the river, and thus the ability to levy duties on Venezuelan commerce. The second placed the border at the Wenamu River rather than the Cuyuni River, giving Venezuela substantial territory east of the line. However, Britain received most of the disputed territory and all of the gold mines.

The Venezuelan representatives, claiming that Britain had unduly influenced the decision of the Russian member of the tribunal, protested the outcome. Periodic protests, however, were confined to the domestic political arena and international diplomatic forums.

The evolutions of subdivisions, régions, provinces, départements, districts of Venezuela since 1830:

1840

1856

1901

1909

1990

=== Immediate reactions ===
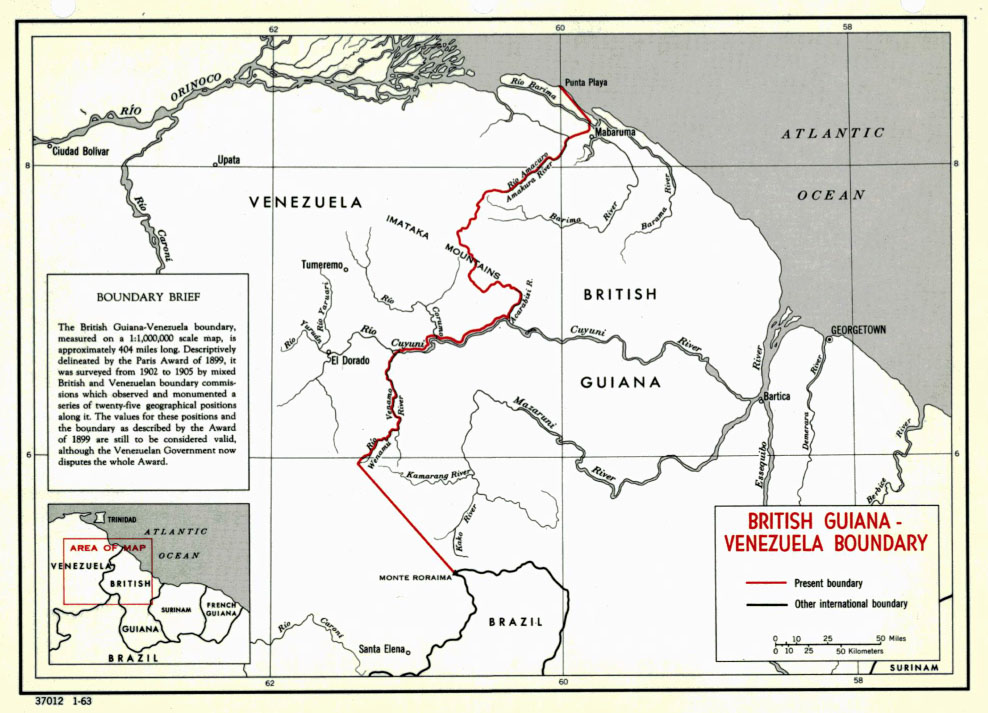
Finalized boundary Venezuelan and British boundary that was made legally binding in 1905, following the Arbitral Award of 1899.

Immediately after the arbitration ruling in 1899, the US counsels for Venezuela, former US President Benjamin Harrison, Severo Mallet-Prevost, Benjamin F. Tracy, James R. Soley, and José María Rojas, were interviewed jointly, and stated their first claims against the ruling:

"The award gives Point Barima, with a strip of land fifty miles long, to Venezuela, which thereby obtains entire control of the River Orinoco. Three thousand square miles in the interior are also awarded to Venezuela. Thus, by a decision in which the British arbitrators concurred, the position taken by Great Britain in 1895 is shown to be unfounded. This, however, in no wise expresses the full extent of Venezuela's victory. Great Britain had claimed 30, 000 square miles of territory west of the Schonburgk line and this she was disposed to arbitrate in 1890. Every foot of that section is now awarded to Venezuela. The award practically endorses the judgment of Sir Robert Schomburgk, whose line it follows except in a few particulars. Great Britain acquires the whole of the river Cuyni, including a site which Venezuela alleged to be a fort at the junction of the Curum and the Cuyuni. The marshy Barima district has been awarded to Venezuela, possibly on the principle of national security, but the condition that the Orinoco shall be a free waterway to all nations. This piece of land covers about thirty square miles. It had been offered with much more land by every British foreign minister since the time of Lord Aberdeen. Great Britain has substantiated almost all her extreme claims. All the valuable plantations and gold fields are now indisputably settled within British territory."

The Venezuelan government showed almost immediate disapproval with the 1899 Arbitral Award. As early as 7 October 1899, Venezuela voiced its condemnation of the Award, and demanded the renegotiation of her eastern border with British Guiana: that day, Venezuelan Foreign Minister José Andrade stated that the Arbitral Award was the product of political collusion and it should not be adhered to by Venezuela. In accordance with the 1899 Arbitral Award, a mixed British-Venezuelan Boundary Commission began work in 1900 to demarcate the border. Representing Venezuela, Abraham Tirado, Carlos Grisanti and Elias Toro surveyed the area of the boundary by the Award, along with two British surveyors who all signed off on the border in 1905.

== 20th century ==
=== Renewed dispute ===
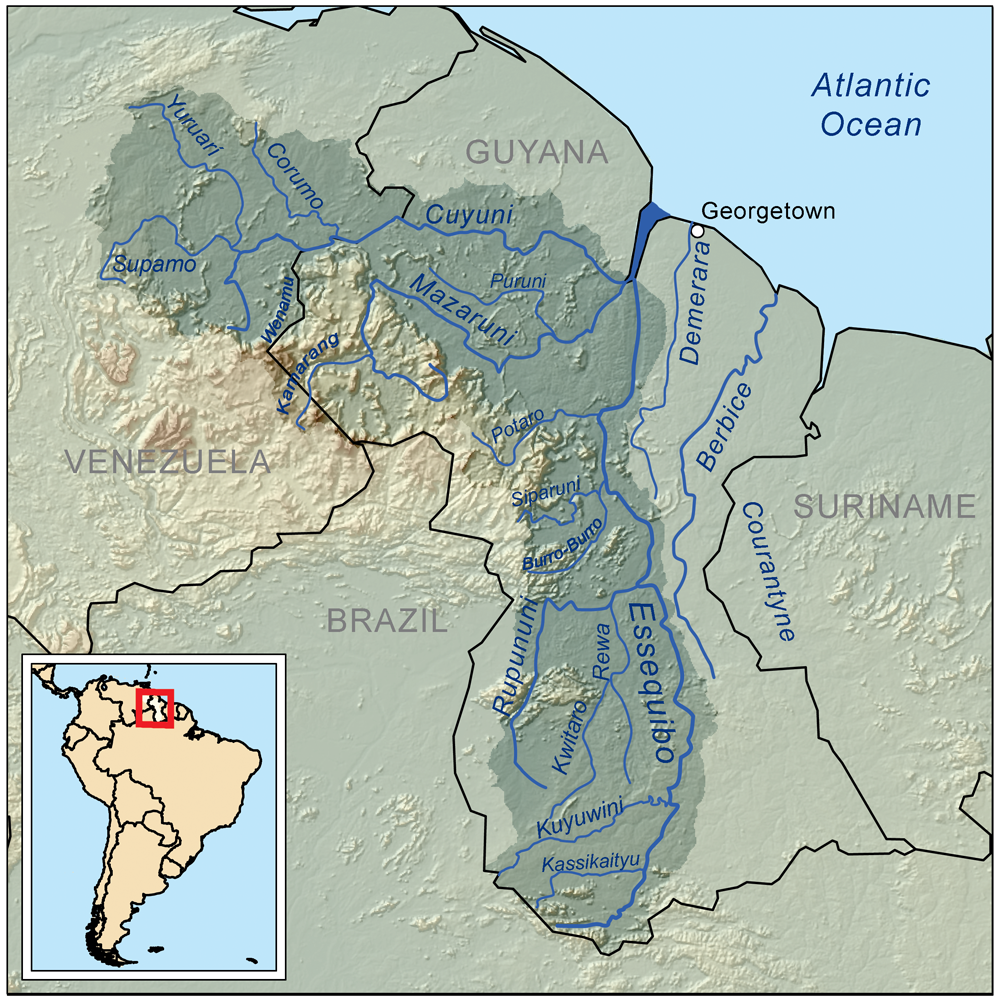
A map of Guyana, showing the Essequibo River and the river's drainage basin (shaded dark). Venezuela claims territory up to the western bank of the river. The historical claim by the UK included the river basin well into current-day Venezuela.

After numerous bilateral diplomatic attempts failed to convince the United Kingdom of its seriousness to nullify the award, Venezuela denounced it before the first assembly of the United Nations in 1945.

In 1949, the US jurist Otto Schoenrich gave the Venezuelan government a memorandum written by Mallet-Prevost, which was written in 1944 to be published only after his death. Mallet-Prevost surmised from the private behavior of the judges that there had been a political deal between Russia and Britain, and said that the Russian chair of the panel, Friedrich Martens, had visited Britain with the two British arbitrators in the summer of 1899, and subsequently had offered the two American judges a choice between accepting a unanimous award along the lines ultimately agreed, or a 3 to 2 majority opinion even more favourable to the British.

The alternative would have followed the Schomburgk Line entirely, and given the mouth of the Orinoco to the British. Mallet-Prevost said that the American judges and Venezuelan counsel were disgusted at the situation and considered the 3 to 2 option with a strongly worded minority opinion, but ultimately went along with Martens to avoid depriving Venezuela of even more territory. This memorandum provided further motives for Venezuela's contentions that there had in fact been a political deal between the British judges and the Russian judge at the Arbitral Tribunal, and led to Venezuela's revival of its claim to the disputed territory.

By the 1950s, Venezuelan media led grassroots movements demanding the acquisition of the Essequibo. Under the dictatorship of Marcos Pérez Jiménez, the Venezuelan government began plans to invade the Essequibo. President Pérez Jiménez anticipated the invasion of Guyana in 1958, but was ultimately overthrown in the 1958 Venezuelan coup d'état before this was finalised.

=== United Nations General Assembly complaint ===
Venezuela formally raised the issue again at an international level before the United Nations in 1962, four years before Guyana won independence from Britain. On 12 November 1962, Venezuelan foreign minister Marcos Falcón Briceño gave an exposition in the Special Political and Decolonization Committee of the United Nations General Assembly to denounce the 1899 Paris Tribunal Arbitration, citing the Mallet-Prevost memorandum. Briceño argued that collusion and nullity vices led to the favourable ruling.

In his exposition, he stressed that Venezuela considered the Paris Arbitration as null and void because of "acts contrary to good faith" of the British government and the Tribunal members. Said complaints led to the 1966 Geneva Agreement. Venezuela also identified several improprieties and vices in the ruling, especially Ultra Vires. It claimed that the referees exceeded the scope of powers granted by the arbitration treaty in 1897 when it drew the border between British Guiana, Brazil, and Suriname, and also decreed freedom of navigation in the Amacuro and Barima rivers

The Venezuelan claim of the nullity of the 1899 ruling has been acknowledged by several foreign scholars and jurists, such as J. Gillis Wetter of Sweden, in his work The International Arbitral Process (1979), awarded by the American Society of International Law. After searching the British official archives, Wetter found further evidence of collusion between Britain and Russia, concluding that the ruling was marred by serious procedural and substantive defects, and that it was more a political compromise than a court ruling. Uruguayan jurist Eduardo Jiménez de Aréchaga, former president of the International Court of Justice, came to similar conclusions.

=== Geneva Agreement ===
At a meeting in Geneva on 17 February 1966, the governments of British Guiana, the United Kingdom, and Venezuela signed the "Agreement to resolve the controversy over the frontier between Venezuela and British Guiana", best known thereafter as the Geneva Agreement of 1966. The agreement established the regulatory framework to be followed by the parties to resolve the issue. According to the agreement, a Mixed Commission was installed to seek satisfactory solutions for the practical settlement of the border controversy. However, the parties never agreed to implement a solution within this Commission due to differing interpretations of the agreement:

- Guyana argued that, before starting the negotiations over the border issue, Venezuela should prove that the Arbitral Award of 1899 was null and void. Guyana did not accept that the 1899 decision was invalid, and held that its participation on the commission was only to resolve Venezuela's assertions.
- Venezuela argued that the Commission did not have a juridical nature or purpose but a deal-making one, so it should go ahead to find "a practical and satisfactory solution", as agreed in the treaty. Venezuela also claimed that the nullity of the Arbitral Award of 1899 was implicit, as otherwise, the existence of the 1966 agreement would be meaningless.

The fifth article of the Geneva Agreement established the status of the disputed territories. The provisions state that no acts or activities taking place on the disputed territories while the Agreement is in force "shall constitute a basis for asserting, supporting or denying a claim to territorial sovereignty." The agreement also has a provision prohibiting both nations from pursuing the issue except through official inter-government channels.

=== Guyanese independence and the occupation of Ankoko Island ===
Five months after Guyana's independence, Venezuelan troops began their occupation of Ankoko island and surrounding islands in October 1966 with Venezuelan troops quickly constructing military installations and an airstrip. Subsequently, on the morning of 14 October 1966, Forbes Burnham, as Prime Minister and Minister of External Affairs of Guyana, dispatched a protest to the Foreign Minister of Venezuela, Ignacio Iribarren Borges, demanding the immediate withdrawal of Venezuelan troops and the removal of installations they had established.

Venezuelan minister Ignacio Iribarren Borges replied stating "the Government of Venezuela rejects the aforementioned protest, because Anacoco Island is Venezuelan territory in its entirety and the Republic of Venezuela has always been in possession of it". The island remained under Venezuelan administration, where a Venezuelan airport and a military base operated.

=== Rupununi uprising ===
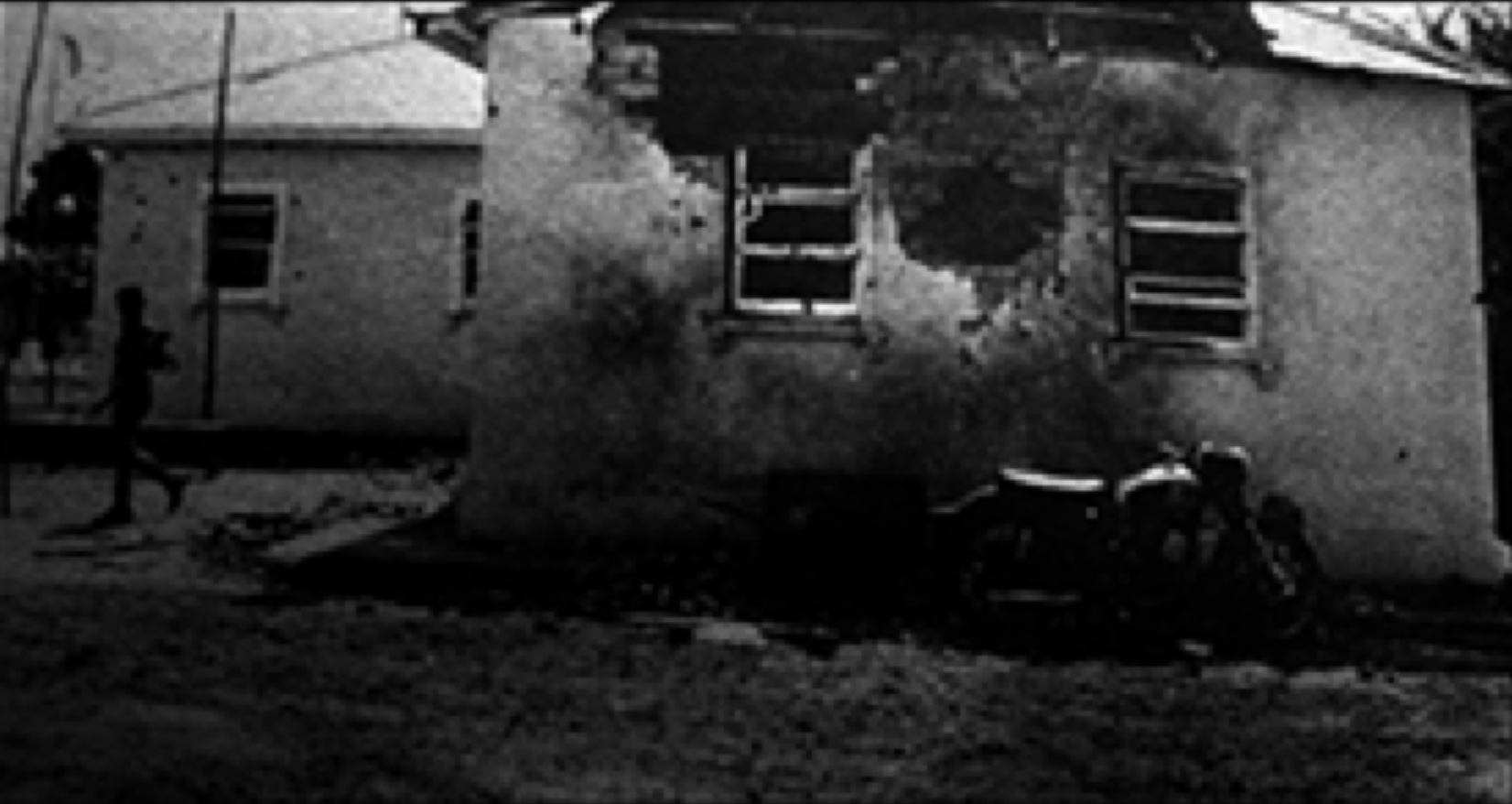
The police station in Lethem, damaged by rebel bazooka fire during the Rupununi uprising

The rebellion was primarily led by ranch owners in the Rupununi district who thought their land rights would be revoked by the new government of Prime Minister Forbes Burnham following the 1968 Guyanese general election. The Guyanese government was in the process of creating a commission for issuing land certificates to indigenous families in the area, though the review of 20,000 square miles (52,000 km^{2}) of land was required.

At a 23 December 1968 meeting, rebels finalised plans of a separated Rupununi state. Venezuela reportedly supported and equipped the Rupununi rebels and their secession movement. Valerie Hart stayed in the capital of Venezuela, Caracas, while her brothers and the Lawrences participated in the rebellion in Guyana.

Rebels armed with machine guns and bazookas began their attacks on Lethem on 2 January 1969, first attacking a police station, killing five police officers along with two civilians while the rebels destroyed buildings belonging to the Guyanese government with bazooka fire. The rebels locked citizens in their homes and blocked airfields in Lethem, Annai Good Hope, Karanambo and Karasabai, attempting to block staging areas for Guyanese troops.

News about the insurrection reached Georgetown by midday prompting the deployment of policemen and soldiers of the Guyana Defence Force (GDF). GDF troops arrived at an open airstrip 5 miles (8.0 km) away from Lethem. As Guyanese soldiers made their approach to the town, the rebels quickly fled, ending the uprising. Academic accounts reported that two or three Amerindians were killed, while rumors reported up to 70 dead.

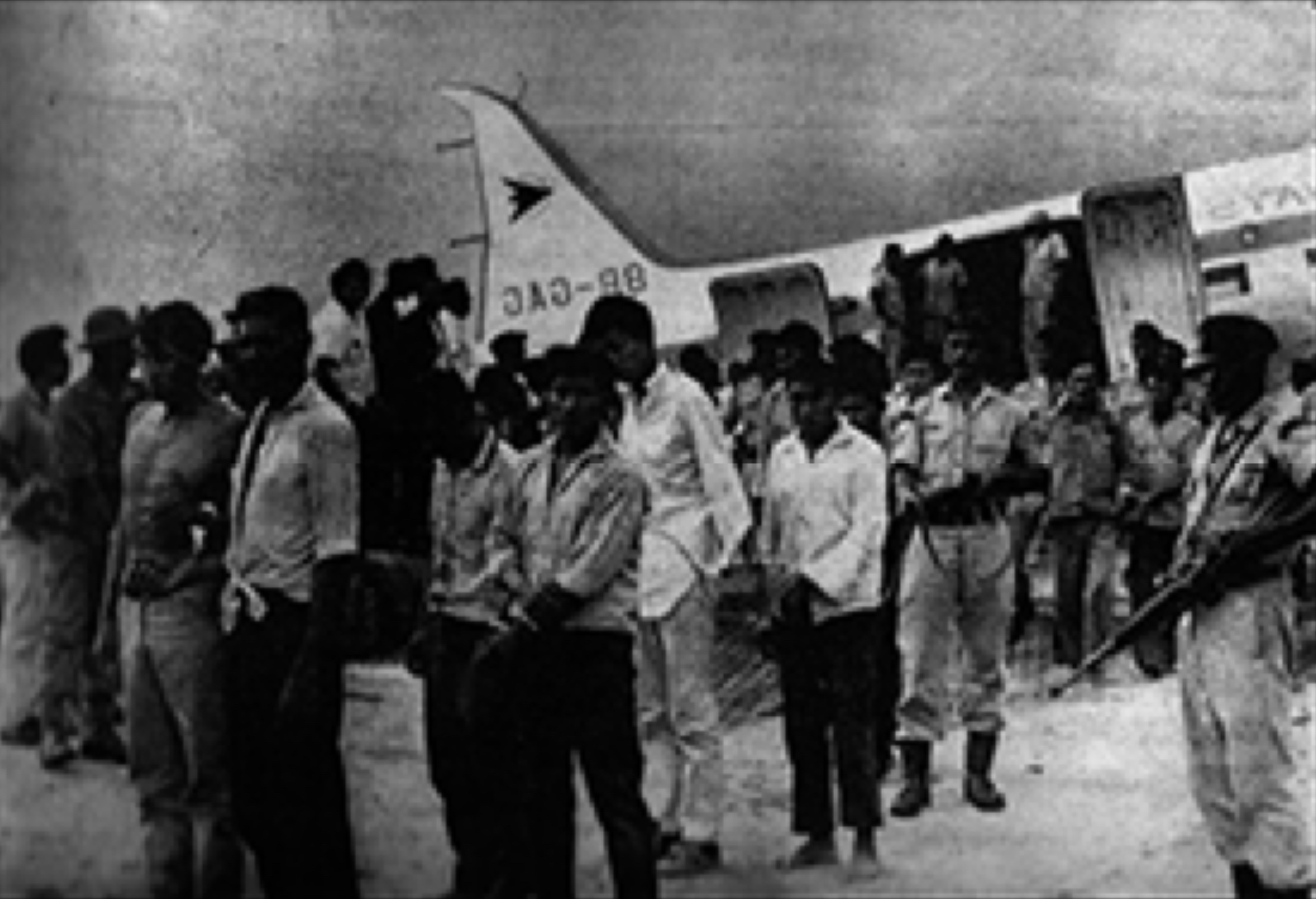
Rebels detained following their attempted rebellion in Rupununi

The Guyanese government accused Venezuela of assisting the rebels, accusations that the Venezuelan government rejected. Members of the failed uprising fled to Venezuela for protection after their plans unraveled, with Valerie Hart and her rebels being granted Venezuelan citizenship by birth since they were recognised as being born in the Essequibo disputed territory. The ranchers who organized the rebellion were settled into the Gran Sabana region by the Venezuelan government. On 6 January 1969, Hart was expelled from the United Force, with the political party saying that she was involved "with the rebellion and plot by a foreign power."

Guyana charged 57 individuals with murder. Of the 28 rebels arrested, 18 were released on 24 January 1969 after having their murder charges dropped while the ten remaining individuals were released later. In late February to early March 1969, Amerindian leaders met with Prime Minister Burnham to declare loyalty to the Guyanese government and condemn the reported involvement of Venezuela. Some Amerindians relocated as a result of the rebellion.

=== Port of Spain Protocol ===
In 1970, after the expiration of the Mixed Commission established according to the Geneva Agreement of 1966, Presidents Rafael Caldera and Forbes Burnham signed the Port of Spain Protocol. The signed protocol declared a 12-year moratorium on Venezuela's reclamation of the Essequibo to allow both governments to promote cooperation and understanding while the border claim was in abeyance. The protocol was formally signed by the Minister of Foreign Affairs of Venezuela Aristides Calvani, Guyanese Minister of Foreign Affairs Shridath Ramphal and British High Commissioner to Trinidad and Tobago Roland Hunte.

The Parliament of Guyana voted for the agreement on 22 June 1970, with only People's Progressive Party voting against believing that the United Nations should resolve the matter. MPs from almost all parties in the Parliament of Venezuela voiced their sharp criticism of the agreement.

In November 1978, more than 900 members of the Peoples Temple cult committed suicide or were forced to commit suicide at Jonestown, a cult settlement which was located in the region.

During the Falklands War between Argentina and the United Kingdom in 1982, Venezuela shared renewed interest to its territorial claims. At the time, a high-level general of the Brazilian Armed Forces warned Venezuela not to attempt any action against Guyana, saying that it would immediately result in a response from the United Kingdom and the United States. Months before the expiration of the Port of Spain Protocol, prominent Venezuelan politician and former interior minister Reinaldo Leandro Mora said in an interview with Venezuelan newspaper El Nacional that if Guyana attempted to develop parts of the Essequibo, that Venezuela would have to "abandon the channels of peaceful negotiation which our national government aspires to and turn to methods involving action."

In 1983, when the Port of Spain Protocol expired, the Venezuelan President Luis Herrera Campins decided to not extend it, resuming his country's effective claim over the territory. Since then, the contacts between Venezuela and Guyana within the provisions of the Treaty of Geneva are under the recommendations of a UN Secretary General's representative which can occasionally be changed with the agreement of both parties. While diplomatic contacts between the two countries and the Secretary General's representative continue, there have been some clashes. The latest personal representative in these efforts is the Norwegian Dag Nylander, appointed in March 2017 by UN Secretary-General António Guterres.

== 21st century ==
=== Chávez administration ===
Venezuela adopted an eight-starred flag in 2006, with the additional star representing the former Guayana Province

President Hugo Chávez eased border tensions with Guyana under advice of his mentor Fidel Castro. In 2004, Chávez said, during a visit in Georgetown, Guyana, that he considered the dispute to be finished.

The 2006 changes to the flag of Venezuela included the addition of an eighth star to represent the previously existing Guayana Province and was seen as an attempt for Chávez to establish his legacy.

Venezuela, with maritime claims in blue and Essequibo (without attendant maritime claims) in gray.

In September 2011, Guyana made an application before the United Nations' Commission on the Limits of the Continental Shelf in order to extend its continental shelf by a further 150 nautical miles (280 km; 170 mi). Since the Commission requests that the areas to be considered cannot be subject to any kind of territorial disputes, the Guyanese application disregarded the Venezuelan claim over the Essequibo, by saying that "there are no disputes in the region relevant to this submission of data and information relating to the outer limits of the continental shelf beyond 200 nautical miles [370 km; 230 mi]."

Venezuela sent an objection to the commission, rejecting the Guyanese application and warning that Guyana had proposed a limit for its continental shelf including "the territory west of the Essequibo river, which is the subject of a territorial sovereignty dispute under the Geneva Agreement of 1966 and, within this framework, a matter for the good offices of the Secretary-General of the United Nations". Venezuela also said that Guyana consulted its neighbours Barbados, Suriname and Trinidad and Tobago before making the application, but did not do the same with Venezuela. "Such a lack of consultation with the Bolivarian Republic of Venezuela, serious in itself in that it violates the relevant rules, is inexplicable in so far as the coast whose projection is used by the Republic of Guyana in its attempt to extend the limits forms part of the disputed territory over which Venezuela demands and reiterates its claim to sovereignty rights", said the Venezuelan communiqué.

=== Oil discovery in Guyana ===
On 10 October 2013, the Venezuelan Navy detained an oil exploration vessel conducting seafloor surveys on behalf of the government of Guyana. The ship and its crew were escorted to the Venezuelan Margarita Island to be prosecuted. The Guyanese Ministry of Foreign Affairs said the vessel was in Guyanese waters, but its Venezuelan counterpart sent a diplomatic note to Guyana stating that the ship was conducting oil research in Venezuelan waters with no authorisation from the country, and demanded an explanation. The vessel, Teknik Perdana, together with its crew, was released the next week, but its captain was charged with violating the Venezuelan exclusive economic zone.

Despite diplomatic protests from Venezuela, the government of Guyana awarded the American oil corporation ExxonMobil a licence to drill for oil in the disputed maritime area in early 2015. In May the government of Guyana announced that ExxonMobil had indeed found promising results in their first round of drilling on the so-called Stabroek Block, an area offshore the Essequibo territory with a size of 26,800 km^{2} (10,300 sq mi). The company announced that further drillings would take place in the coming months to better evaluate the potential of the oil field.

Venezuela responded to the declaration with a decree issued on 27 May 2015, including the maritime area in dispute in its national marine protection sphere, thus extending the area that the Venezuelan Navy claims into the disputed area. This in turn caused the government of Guyana to summon the Venezuelan ambassador for further explanation. The tensions have further intensified since and Guyana withdrew the operating licence of Conviasa, the Venezuelan national airline, stranding a plane and passengers in Georgetown.

On 7 January 2021, there was the issuance of Decree No. 4415 by the President of Venezuela, Nicolas Maduro, with the support of Venezuela's National Assembly, which seeks to reinforce Venezuela's claim to Guyana's Essequibo Region and its attendant maritime space.

=== International Court of Justice ===
In the case that by December 2017, the UN understood that there was no "significant progress" in resolving the dispute, the Secretary-General of the United Nations António Guterres would intend to refer the case to the International Court of Justice (ICJ), unless the two countries explicitly requested it not to do so. In January 2018, Guterres concluded that the Good Offices Process had not determined a peaceful conclusion and the UN referred the case. Guterres chose to have the controversy settled by the ICJ on whether the 1899 award was valid.

On 29 March, Guyana gave a request to the ICJ to solve the territorial dispute. Venezuela proposed that Guyana restore the diplomatic contacts to attempt to find a solution regarding the territorial dispute, arguing that Guterres "exceeded the competences given to him as the Good Offices Figure" and that the decision "contravenes the spirit, purpose and reason of the Geneva Agreement". The Venezuelan government also stated that it did not recognise the jurisdiction of the Court as mandatory.

On 19 June, Guyana announced that it would ask the Court to rule on their favour, citing Article 53 of the ICJ Statute, which states that "if any of the two parties does not show at the tribunal or fails to defend their case, the other party has the right to communicate with the court and to rule in favour of their claim". In July 2018, the government of Venezuela, led by Nicolás Maduro, argued that the ICJ did not hold jurisdiction over the dispute and said that Venezuela would not participate in the proceedings. The Court stated that Guyana would have until 19 November to present their arguments and Venezuela would have until 18 April 2019 to present their counterarguments. During the Venezuelan presidential crisis, disputed acting President Juan Guaidó and the pro-opposition National Assembly of Venezuela ratified the territorial dispute over the territory.

The oral audiences were planned to take place from 23 to 27 March 2020, in which the ICJ would determine if they held jurisdiction in the dispute, however this was delayed indefinitely due to the worldwide COVID-19 pandemic. Venezuela did not take part in the hearings which were rescheduled for 30 June. On 18 December 2020, the Court ruled that it had jurisdiction and accepted the case. On 8 March 2021, Venezuela was given until 8 March 2023 to submit a counter-memorial.

On 18 September 2020, the United States announced that it would join Guyana on sea patrols in the area. The first agreement in the negotiations between the Maduro government and the Venezuelan opposition in Mexico in September 2021 was to act jointly in the claim of Venezuelan sovereignty over Essequibo.

The ICJ ruled that it had jurisdiction to determine the territorial dispute in April 2023.

=== Venezuelan consultative referendum ===
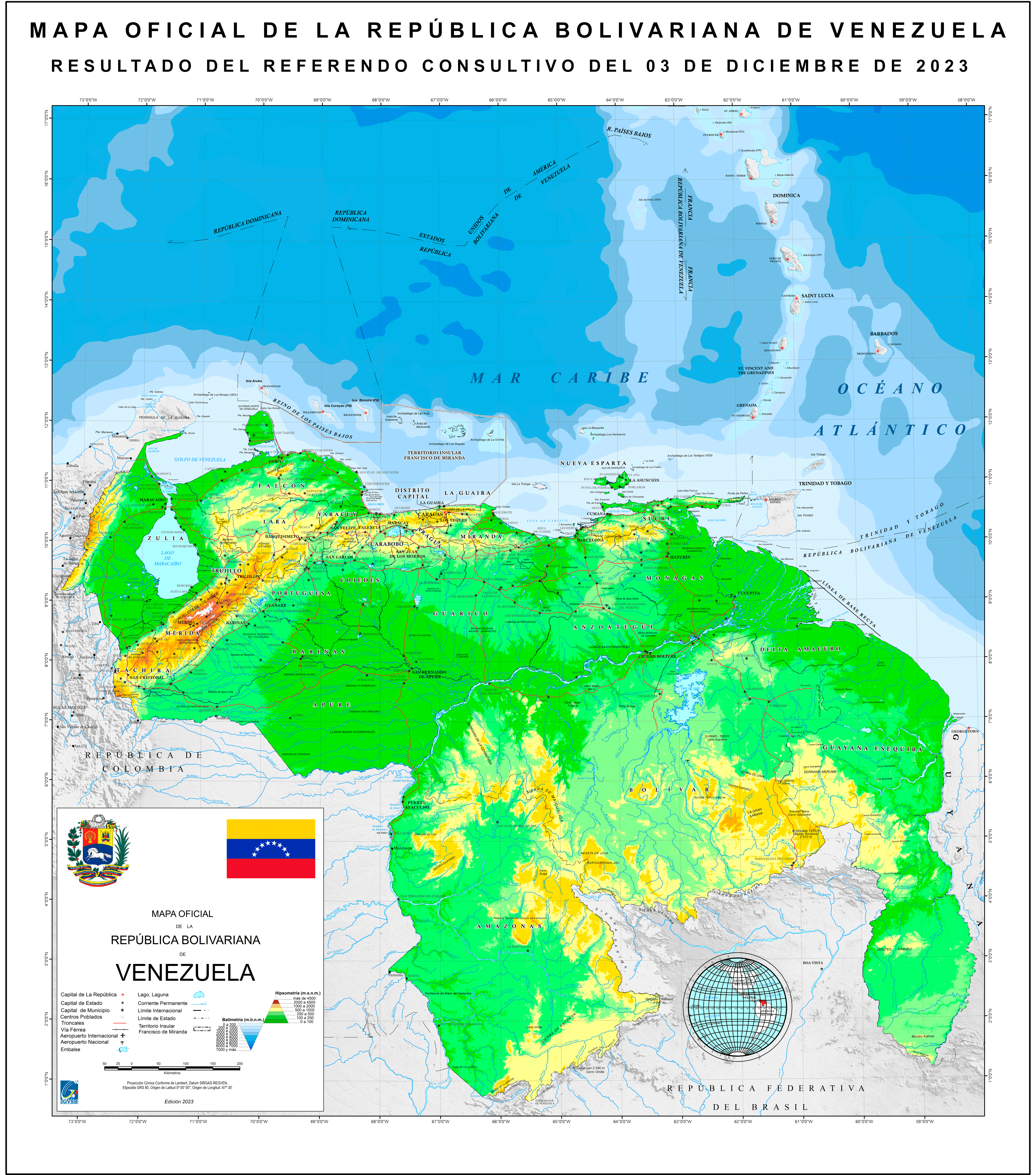
Among his decrees shortly after the referendum, Venezuelan president Nicolás Maduro ordered the publication of a new map, including the Esequibo territory, "in all schools, public entities, universities and 'in all homes' in the country"

On 31 October 2023, the government of Guyana filed a request with the ICJ requesting intervention against a proposed referendum approved by the Venezuelan National Electoral Council on 23 October 2023, asking to support its position in the dispute, arguing that the referendum served as a pretext for the Venezuelan government to abandon negotiations with Guyana. The proposed referendum was condemned by the Commonwealth of Nations and Caribbean Community (CARICOM), who both issued statements in support of Guyana and the agreed ICJ process for dispute resolution.

In response to the increased tensions, the Brazilian military on 29 November 2023 "intensified defensive actions" along its northern border. On 1 December 2023, the ICJ ordered Venezuela to not make any attempts to disrupt the current territory controlled by Guyana until the court makes a later determination. The referendum took place on 3 December, and the National Electoral Council initially reported that Venezuelans voted "yes" more than 95% of the time on each of the five questions on the ballot. International analysts and media reported that turnout had been remarkably low and that the Venezuelan government had falsified the results.

There has been no similar consultation conducted, by either Venezuela or Guyana, with the indigenous people of the region.

== Venezuelan administrative laws ==
Súper Bigote, Venezuelan propaganda cartoon about the Venezuelan referendum on Esequibo, 2023.

According to some interpretations of Venezuelan legislation, Guayana Esequiba is an integral part of the jurisdiction of the states of Bolívar and Delta Amacuro, whose common boundary runs along the cusp of the Imataka mountain range.

The state of Bolívar, in its constitution, establishes the following:

Article 15º The territory and other geographical spaces of the State of Bolivar are those that historically corresponded to the Guayana Province of the Captaincy General of Venezuela, before the political transformation initiated on 19 April 1810, then delimited in accordance with the Political Territorial Law of the Republic of 28 April 1856, with the modifications that have resulted from the laws of the Republic, the agreements and other legal acts validly celebrated in accordance with the Constitution, the national laws and the laws of the State. In all acts of the State, in which its territory is described or referred to, the reservation that the Arbitral Award of Paris of 1899 is void and null, according to the principles of law and justice that govern the international community and contribute to affirm territorial integrity, shall be understood to be incorporated, even if not expressly so, in all acts of the State. The State of Bolivar will collaborate and support the Bolivarian Republic of Venezuela in the achievement of a satisfactory solution for the practical settlement of the territorial dispute, based on the Geneva Agreement of 17 February 1966.

The original territory of what is now the state of Delta Amacuro extends from the Orinoco delta to the Esequibo River. The information website of the governor's office of this state states the following about its territoriality:

When the Federal Territory of Delta Amacuro was created, it had an area of 63,667 km², and currently has 40,200 km². The difference between these two areas was lost by the Delta Amacuro due to the Paris Arbitral Award signed on 3 October 1899, by which 23,467 km² of its territory was taken away by English Guyana.

Historically in Venezuela, the central power (government and other Venezuelan state agencies) has been directly in charge of the treatment of the case of Guayana Esequiba, leaving the local governors' and mayors' offices with very little participation and power of action. A special and differentiated treatment is given to the jurisdictions of these national states, which do not usually include in their maps their territorial portion within the Guayana Esequiba, although in the national maps of the country the inclusion of the area under claim is mandatory. This has led some people to erroneously think that the Guayana Esequiba is a new Venezuelan state or federal territory.

In 1999, when the new Venezuelan Magna Carta was enacted, Article 10 of the Constitution of the Venezuela established the following as Venezuelan territory:

The territory and other geographic spaces of the Republic are those that corresponded to the Captaincy General of Venezuela before the political transformation initiated on 19 April 1810, with the modifications resulting from treaties and arbitration awards not vitiated by nullity.

In August 2015, some deputies of the Venezuelan National Assembly proposed the creation of state number 25 (Estado Esequibo) uniting the territory of Guayana Esequiba (159,500 square kilometers) and the Sifontes Municipality (24,393 square kilometers), with capital in Tumeremo, the latter territory currently under the jurisdiction of the state of Bolivar. The proposal was officially introduced before the secretariat of the National Assembly, but was not approved.

== See also ==
- Belizean–Guatemalan territorial dispute
- Borders of Venezuela
- Essequibo (colony)
- Gran Colombia
- Guayana Region
- Guyana–Venezuela relations
- South American territorial disputes
- Pirara Area, another territorial dispute involving Brasil
- Tigri Area, another territorial dispute involving Suriname

== Bibliography ==
- LaFeber, Walter. "The Background of Cleveland's Venezuelan Policy: A Reinterpretation." American Historical Review 66 (July 1961), pp. 947–2967.
- Schoult, Lars. A History of U.S. Policy Toward Latin America Cambridge: Harvard University Press, 1998.
- U.S. Department of State, Office of the Historian, "Venezuela Boundary Dispute, 1895–1899"
- Border Controversy between Guyana and Venezuela, United Nations
