= Ankoko Island =

Island at the confluence of the Cuyuni and the Wenamu

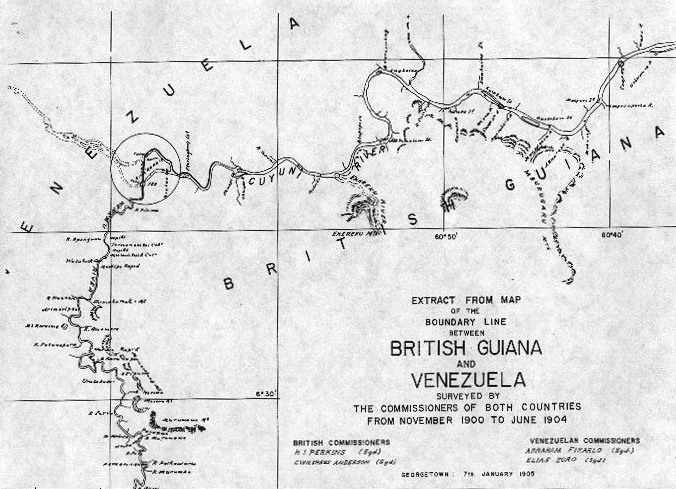
1905 Map of Ankoko Island (shown in the circle)

Ankoko Island (Spanish: Isla de Anacoco) is an island located at the confluence of the Cuyuni River and Wenamu River, at 6°43′N 61°8′W, on the border between Venezuela and Guyana.

The Ankoko Island border was finalized in 1905 by the British-Venezuelan Mixed Boundary Commission, in accordance with the Arbitral Award of 3 October 1899. Venezuelan commissioners Abraham Tirado and Elias Toro surveyed the area of the boundary for demarcation and, along with two British surveyors, all participants agreed and signed off on the border in 1905. Domestically, Venezuelans were vocal in their disappointment with the 1899 ruling. In the 20th century, the government of Venezuela officially sought to abrogate the legal borders and revert to the colonial boundary of the Essequibo River as set by the Spanish Empire. In 1966, five months after Guyana gained independence, the Venezuelan armed forces crossed the boundary on Ankoko Island and has occupied the Guyanese side of the island ever since, in violation of the peace treaty set forth by the Geneva Agreement.

The status of the island is subject to the Geneva Agreement, which was signed by the United Kingdom, Venezuela and British Guiana on 17 February 1966. This treaty stipulates that the parties will agree to find a practical, peaceful and satisfactory solution to the border dispute. Venezuela, which claims Ankoko Island as its own in the Guyana–Venezuela territorial dispute, established a military base on the island in 1966, which Guyana claims as an intrusion and aggression on its sovereign territory.

Due to a stalemate in talks and lack of progress with the Geneva Agreement, the Secretary-General referred the entire matter to the International Court of Justice. On 18 December 2020, the ICJ accepted the case submitted by Guyana to settle the dispute.

== History ==
=== Venezuelan occupation ===
In February 1966, the governments of Venezuela, the United Kingdom and Guyana signed the Geneva Agreement aimed at resolving the controversy over the Essequibo territorial dispute.

Five months after Guyana's independence from the United Kingdom, Venezuelan troops began their occupation of Ankoko Island in October 1966. Venezuelan troops quickly constructed military installations and an airstrip.

Subsequently, on the morning of the 14 October 1966, Forbes Burnham, as Prime Minister and Minister of External Affairs of Guyana, dispatched a protest to the Foreign Minister of Venezuela, Ignacio Iribarren Borges, demanding the immediate withdrawal of Venezuelan troops and the removal of installations they had established. Venezuelan minister Ignacio Iribarren Borges replied stating "the Government of Venezuela rejects the aforementioned protest, because Anacoco Island is Venezuelan territory in its entirety and the Republic of Venezuela has always been in possession of it". The island remains under Venezuelan administration, where a Venezuelan airport and a military base operate.

=== Recent history ===
During the Venezuelan presidential crisis, interim president Juan Guaidó and the National Assembly of Venezuela renewed territory disputes with Guyana regarding sovereignty of the island. National Assembly deputies visited the island "as an act of ratification of Venezuelan sovereignty over the area".

== Gallery ==
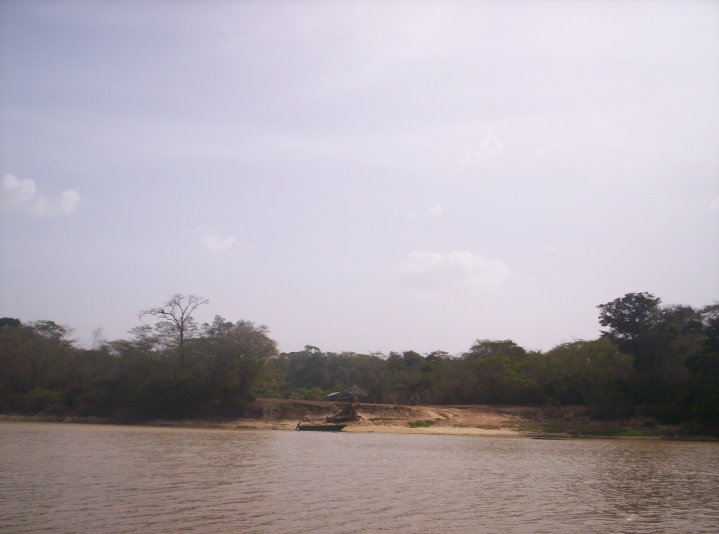
Caño "Brazo Negro" that emerges from the main channel of the Cuyuní River to the North and forms the island of Anacoco (in the background).

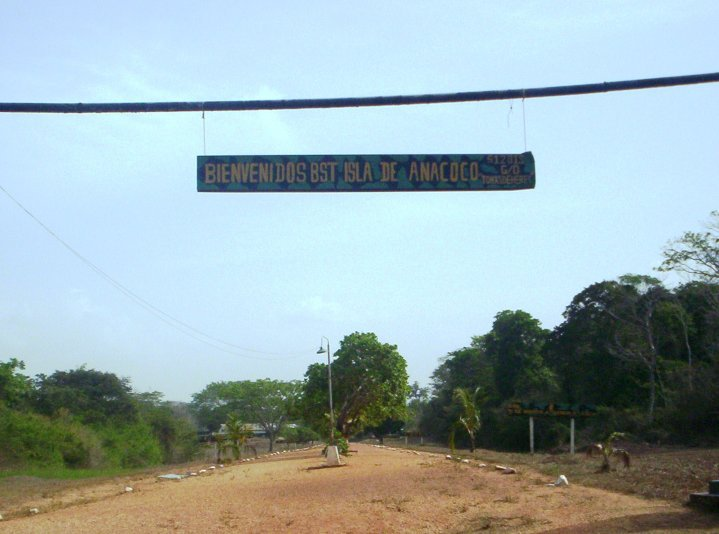
Entrance to the military post of the Venezuelan army on the island of Anacoco through the Caño "Brazo Negro".

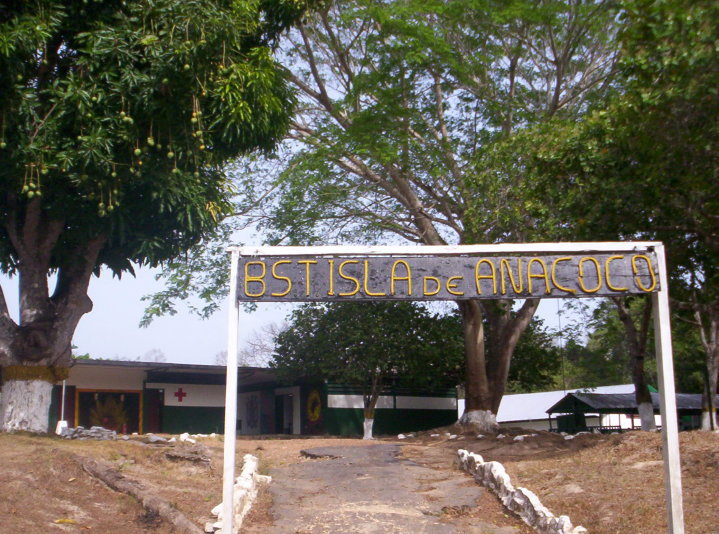
Venezuelan military post on the island of Anacoco.

== See also ==
- Guyana–Venezuela relations
- Venezuelan crisis of 1895
- Corocoro Island
