= Corocoro Island =

Island on the Venezuela–Guyana border

Coordinates: 8°32′49″N 60°04′07″W

Location of Corocoro Island in South America

Corocoro Island (Isla Corocoro) is an island near the mouth of the Amacuro River and in the delta of the Barima River in South America. The northernmost part of the land border between Guyana and Venezuela runs through the island. It is one of the few islands that is divided between more than one sovereign state. The vast majority of the island is Venezuelan territory (610 square kilometers). The north side of the island is the Atlantic Ocean and the south side is the Barima River. The Island was claimed by British Guiana but mostly ceded to Venezuela, following the Paris Arbitral Award of 1899. Corocoro Island contains the northernmost point of the disputed border with Guyana, an area referred to instead as Guayana Esequiba by Venezuela.

Isla Corocoro Lighthouse (8°33′-40N 59°59′-75W), marking the boundary between Guyana and Venezuela, stands on Punta Playa.

== Reserve ==
The Venezuelan-controlled part of 61,000 hectares or 610 km² is part of a natural reserve protected by the Venezuelan government, called the Imataca Reserve, and is part of the so-called Coastal Protection Zone.

== See also ==
- List of divided islands
