= Guyana–Venezuela relations =

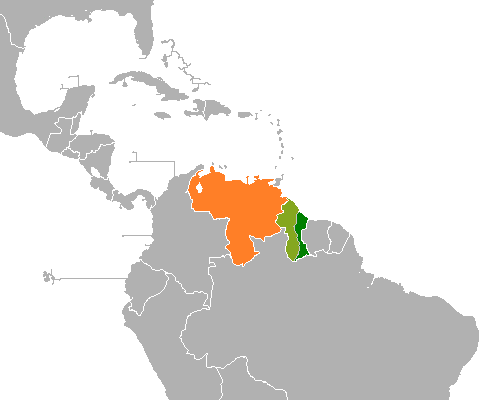

- Guyana: Venezuela

Guyana–Venezuela relations include diplomatic, economic and other interactions between the neighboring countries of the Co-operative Republic of Guyana and the Bolivarian Republic of Venezuela.

== Border dispute ==
Guyana and Venezuela have a long history of debate surrounding their border. In 1897, the matter was taken to international arbitration.

Venezuela claimed more than half of the territory of the British colony of Guyana at the time of the Latin American wars of independence. Guyana argues that the boundary between the nations was clarified in the Arbitral Award of 1899 signed by Guyana, whereas Venezuela called the award an "Anglo-Russian conspiracy". In 1962, Venezuela declared that it would no longer abide by the arbitration decision, which ceded mineral-rich territory in the Orinoco basin to Guyana. The disputed area is called "Guayana Esequiba" by Venezuela. A border commission was set up in 1966 with representatives from Guyana, Venezuela and the United Kingdom, but failed to reach agreement. Venezuela vetoed Guyana's bid to become a member of the Organization of American States (OAS) in 1967. In 1969, Venezuela backed an abortive uprising in the disputed area.

Under intense diplomatic pressure, Venezuela agreed in 1970 to a 12-year moratorium on the dispute with the Protocol of Port-of-Spain. In 1981, Venezuela refused to renew the protocol. However, with changes to the governments of both countries, relations improved, to the extent that Venezuela sponsored Guyana's 1990 bid for OAS membership.

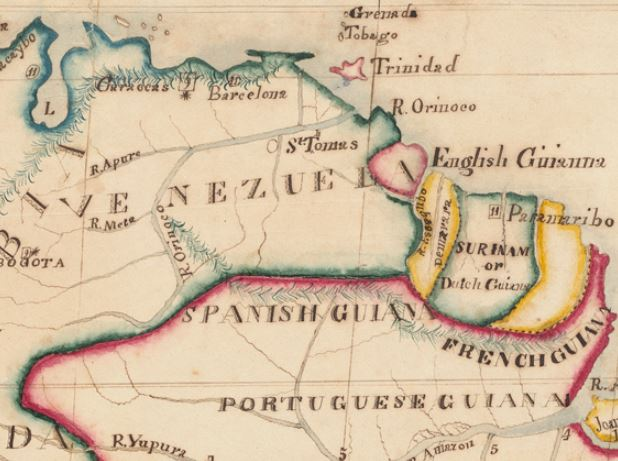
Venezuela and British Guiana (Guyana) in 1831, according to English cartography.

In 1999, tensions flared up once more as Venezuelan troops inundated the border areas, inciting protests in Georgetown. In 2007, Guyana claimed Venezuelan troops destroyed Guyanese gold-mining dredges by the border.

In 2013, the Venezuelan navy seized an oil exploration vessel operating in disputed waters claimed as Exclusive Economic Zones by both Venezuela and Guyana. In taking the case to the ICJ, Guyana looks to authorize the division of the area with Venezuela. The zone at issue is west of Guyana's Essequibo River. The disclosure of oil off the coast has started a discussion among Guyana and Venezuela over the border itself, with both claiming the area.

The dispute was taken to the International Court of Justice (ICJ) in 2018. Venezuela did not participate in the hearing that was held on 30 June 2020, arguing that the ICJ did not have jurisdiction. In September 2020, the United States announced that it would join Guyana on sea patrols in the area. UN Secretary-General António Guterres alluded the case to the ICJ in 2018. Pressures additionally heightened when Venezuela's naval force held onto an oil research transport in 2013 and moved toward another in 2018.

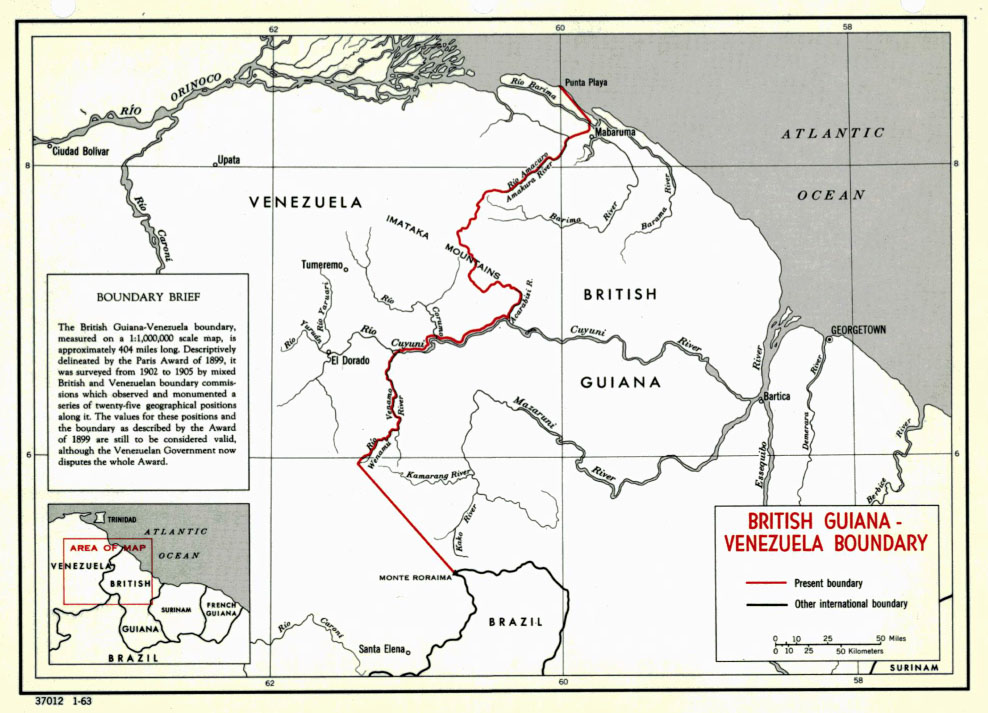
The demarcated border for Venezuela and British Guiana that was made legally binding in 1905 following the Arbitral Award of 1899. It established the first and only accepted boundary between Spanish-speaking Venezuela and its Anglophone counterpart.

On 21 January 2021, 12 fishermen were detained by Venezuelan naval troops operated in the Waini River, arbitrated to be inside Guyanese territory. The prisoners were to be detained for 45 days "pending investigation". All fisherman were released from custody by 3 February.

In September 2022, the Venezuelan president Nicolas Maduro published a photo of the Kaieteur Falls, the world's largest single-drop waterfall and Guyana's main tourist attraction, on social media with a map including Essequibo in Venezuela. Many Guyanese demanded that Facebook and Twitter remove the "illegal and offensive publications".

American multinational ExxonMobil and its commercial partners have discovered 46 oil fields in Guyana since 2015. In 2023 alone, four oil fields were found off the coast of Guyana, of which the latest one was announced in October 2023 and whose location was in the disputed Essequibo region, which makes up more than two thirds of Guyana's current total territory.

In April 2023, the International Court of Justice ruled that it has jurisdiction over the dispute in a lawsuit filed by Guyana in 2018.

In a December 2023 referendum for Venezuelan voters, 95% voted to claim the Essequibo region. The Venezuelan National Electoral Council reported a voter turnout of 10.5 million voters out of 20.6 million eligible people, meaning that more people participated in the referendum than voted for Hugo Cháves in 2012. The validity of this figure has been questioned by Reuters witnesses and The Associated Press, as the local voting centers seemed to not reflect this turnout. The electoral authority purportedly posted and later deleted a photo showing 2 million votes for each of the five questions, suggesting a turnout of 10%. Intelligence collected by Guyana suggested a turnout of fewer than 1.5 million people.

In October 2023, it was reported that the Venezuelan military was building a runway near the border with Guyana's Essequibo "to develop" the region. Guyana's president Irfaan Ali responded by saying the country will not give up "an inch" of the region.

In November 2023, Guyanese Prime Minister Mark Anthony Phillips took the case to the Organization of American States (OAS) where he accused Venezuela of a military buildup near the Essequibo border, and warned of the consequences of it for Guyana's sovereignty. OAS' Secretary-General Luis Almagro, the Caribbean Community (CARICOM), and the United States government expressed their support for Guyana. Additionally Guyana asked the International Court of Justice (ICJ) for an "urgent" injunction to block Venezuela's incoming referendum, which the Court agreed to hear about on 1 December. No hearing dates were set, however, for the main dispute.

On 3 January 2026, the United States carried out a military operation in Venezuela that led to the capture of President Nicolás Maduro and his wife. Guyanese president Irfaan Ali said his government had been monitoring the situation throughout the morning, and that the security forces were fully mobilised and watching developments. Prime Minister Mark Phillips also reassured citizens that the country was secure and prepared. Opposition parties urged the government to put protective measures in place and to keep its guard up. Ali later said that the regional security climate had improved after Maduro's capture, with "greater stability" and "less rhetoric" than under the Maduro government. In February 2026, however, he cautioned that Maduro's fall did not lessen the threat to the Essequibo.

Delcy Rodríguez, who took power as acting president of Venezuela after Maduro's removal, maintained Venezuela's claim to the Essequibo. In April 2026, Ali wrote to CARICOM chairman Terrance Drew to object to a brooch showing a map of Venezuela that included the Essequibo, which Rodríguez wore during visits to Grenada and Barbados.

The International Court of Justice held oral hearings on the merits of the case in The Hague beginning on 4 May 2026. Rodríguez travelled to the Netherlands and attended the final day of hearings on 11 May, calling the case a "legal absurdity". Venezuela stated that its participation did not amount to recognition of the court's jurisdiction. The Guyanese government has said it expects a final judgment, which would be binding on both countries, between November 2026 and January 2027.

== Trade ==
In 2019, Venezuela exported US$8.96 million worth of goods to Guyana which consisted mainly refined petroleum. In 2019, Guyana exported US$73.9 million to Venezuela which consisted mainly of rice.

== Ambassadors ==
=== Guyanese ambassadors to Venezuela ===
- Bayney Karran
- Odeen Ishmael, 2003–2011
- Geoffrey da Silva, 2011–2015
- Cheryl Miles, 2016–2019
- Richard Van West-Charles, since 2024

=== Venezuelan ambassadors to Guyana ===
- Reina Margarita Arratia Díaz, 2015
- Patrick Hossain, honorary consul, 2017
- Luis Edgardo Diaz Monclus, active in 2021
- Carlos Amador Perez Silva, since 2022

== See also ==
- Ankoko Island
- Corocoro Island
