= Dag Halvor Nylander =

Norwegian diplomat

Dag Halvor Nylander (born 24 March 1969) is a Norwegian diplomat, who formerly served as the Personal Representative of the United Nations Secretary-General on the Border Controversy between Guyana and Venezuela. He was appointed to this position on 27 February 2017.

== Career ==
Nylander is a graduate of the University of Oslo with a degree in law. A career diplomat, he has represented his government in various capacities. From 2012 to 2016, he was Norway's Special Envoy to the Colombia peace process and also served as Head of Norway's Mission in Bogotá from 2006 to 2008. He represented his country as a delegate to the United Nations from 2001 to 2004 and at Norway's Embassy in Buenos Aires from 1999 to 2001.
