= Valerie Hart =

Guyanese indigenous political leader (1933–2021)

President of the Essequibo Free State
- In office 28 December 1963 – 4 February 1969
- Preceded by: Position created
- Succeeded by: Position dissolved

Personal details
- Born: Valerie Paul Hart; 13 March 1933 Georgetown, British Guiana
- Died: 26 February 2021 (aged 87) Vero Beach, Florida, U.S.
- Party: Guyana's Amerindian Party (1967–1969)
- Spouse: Harry Jim Hart
- Occupation: Politician

Valerie Aurelia Hart (13 March 1933 – 26 February 2021) was a Guyanese indigenous political leader from the Wapishana ethnic group and a member of Guyana's Amerindian Party, opposed to the Forbes Burnham government; she ran for the 1968 general elections, although she was not elected. She was exiled after participating in the Rupununi uprising.

== Separatist movement ==
Being a member of Guyana's Amerindian Party along with her husband's family, she was present at the First Conference of Amerindians Leaders, named the Cabacaburi Congress, that presented several demands to the Prime Minister Forbes Burnham representing the community of around 40,000 indigenous people of the region.

In the 1968 Guyanese general election, Hart ran for a seat in the National Assembly of Guyana under The United Force party.

On the morning of 2 January 1969, there was a peasant uprising against the authorities of the district and took public buildings, airports, and hostages. Valerie was named First President of the Essequibo Free State that immediately requested protection from the Venezuelan government of Raúl Leoni. That night, the rebellion was violently suppressed by Guyanese Defense Forces, resulting in the destruction of several indigenous homes, around 100 fatalities and the escape of many indigenous to Brasil and Venezuela.

== Exile ==
That same night, Valerie Hart fled with her family to Ciudad Bolívar, before going to Caracas to request military aid from the Venezuelan government; according to her, her goal was, on behalf of the rebels, to create an independent region of Guyana.

Nosotros, los habitantes del Rupununi de la Guayana Esequiba y en consecuencia venezolanos por nacimiento, según el articulo 35 de la Constitución Nacional, hacemos un llamado al gobierno, al pueblo y a las Fuerzas Armadas de Venezuela para que nos ayuden e impidan que las hordas del Primer Ministro de Guyana nos masacren.

— Valerie Hart, Caracas, 1969
Translation:

We, the inhabitants of the Rupununi of the Guayana Esequiba and in consequence Venezuelans by birth, according to article 35 of the National Constitution, make a call upon the government, to the people and to the Armed Forces of Venezuela to help us and prevent the hordes of the Prime Minister of Guyana from massacring us.

Valerie Hart had private meetings with Venezuelan Interior and Foreign Ministers, Reinaldo Leandro Mora and Ignacio Iribarren Borges, respectively, in search of help, as well as expressing interest in requesting an interview with the President Raúl Leoni and with the winning candidate of the last elections and next president Rafael Caldera. From the interviews conducted with the Venezuelan Foreign and Interior ministers, she said that they had not made any offer, since they told her that they were very sensitive international political issues. Minutes after, questioned by journalists after leaving his office, the Minister declared that "Venezuela is not considering aiding the Guyana rebels". Interior Affairs Minister Reinaldo Leandro Mora declared that "the movement would not have failed if Venezuela had intervened". In a press conference nearby, in the Antímano Lounge of El Conde hotel, Valerie Hart declared indignate that: "I want it to be well understood that if the Venezuelan government, by pressure of the United States, does not lend any help to the Rupununi people, it would be equal to support the Burnham government".

== Personal life ==
According to David Granger, “She was not an indigenous woman but a coastlander of Chinese extraction. She grew up in a village on the West Coast of Demerara with her parents and several siblings, one of whom, Mrs. Wong was visiting when the uprising began.” Hart owned a ranch at Moreru.

Valerie Hart got her last name from her husband, Harry Hart, who was a pilot with whom she had five children. Hart's husband’s family moved to Guyana from North Dakota in 1914. He had six brothers, American citizens who were educated in the United States. Both Valerie and her husband participated in the celebrations of the Independence of Guyana in 1966 in an aerobatic display.

Hart became an Evangelical Christian later in life. She died in Vero Beach, Florida on 26 February 2021, at the age of 87.
