= Amacuro River =

Location
- Countries: Venezuela; Guyana

Physical characteristics
- Mouth: Orinoco River
  - location: Venezuela
  - coordinates: 08°32′00″N 60°28′00″W

The Amacuro River is a river in South America. It forms part of the northern section of the international boundary between Venezuela and Guyana. It is part of the Orinoco River basin.

The river boundary is a part of the Guyana-Venezuela border dispute. There are reports that the Dutch were in the Amacuro in 1637, with settlements reaching the river in the mid-17th century. Venezuelan claims dispute the fact, citing the History of the colonies of Essequibo, Demerara and Berbice (1785) stated that "the Netherlands’ control had not extended to the Amacuro or even the Barima".

It is an area traditionally of Warao people. Many Venezuelan indigenous peoples, some of whom are related to Whitewater residents or persons from other communities in the sub-region, cross the Amacuro River daily in search of food and to seek medical attention.

Whitewater is an Amerindian settlement on the Amacuro.

== See also ==
- List of rivers of Venezuela
- Corocoro Island

== Bibliography ==
- Rand McNally, The New International Atlas, 1993.
