= Hinterland energy in Guyana =

In Guyana, the areas outside of the coastal plain are referred to as hinterland. Approximately twenty percent of the Guyanese population live in the hinterland. The population mostly consists of Amerindian communities who have little access to modern energy services such as electricity, light and modern fuels for cooking and transportation. This situation contrasts with the coastal plain, where there is access to the electricity grid. Several initiatives are in place to improve energy services in the hinterland.

According to a 2013 survey of Amerindian villages done by the Inter-American Development Bank, "the most common source of electricity was a government-donated 65kW photovoltaic panel, and the second most common was a village-operated diesel generator. A few households reported having personal generators and privately purchased photovoltaic panels. In most villages, electric service is intermittent, provided for only four to six hours per day." St. Ignatius is an exception, as the community receives electricity from the Lethem grid.

== Photovoltaic installations ==
Photovoltaic systems can be Solar Home Systems, installations for a specific application (like a water pump or freezer) or community or mini-grids serving multiple users.

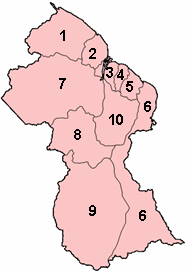
Regions of Guyana

No public records exist on private solar home systems in use in Guyana. However, several development projects have comprising solar home system (SHS) installations or portable systems (Pico-PV) for small lights etc. have been carried out in Hinterland villages. These projects typically use a one size fits all approach to serve a large number of beneficiaries. Solar systems for community use or specific consumers are generally larger in size, and designed specifically to meet the electric load.

== Biofuels ==
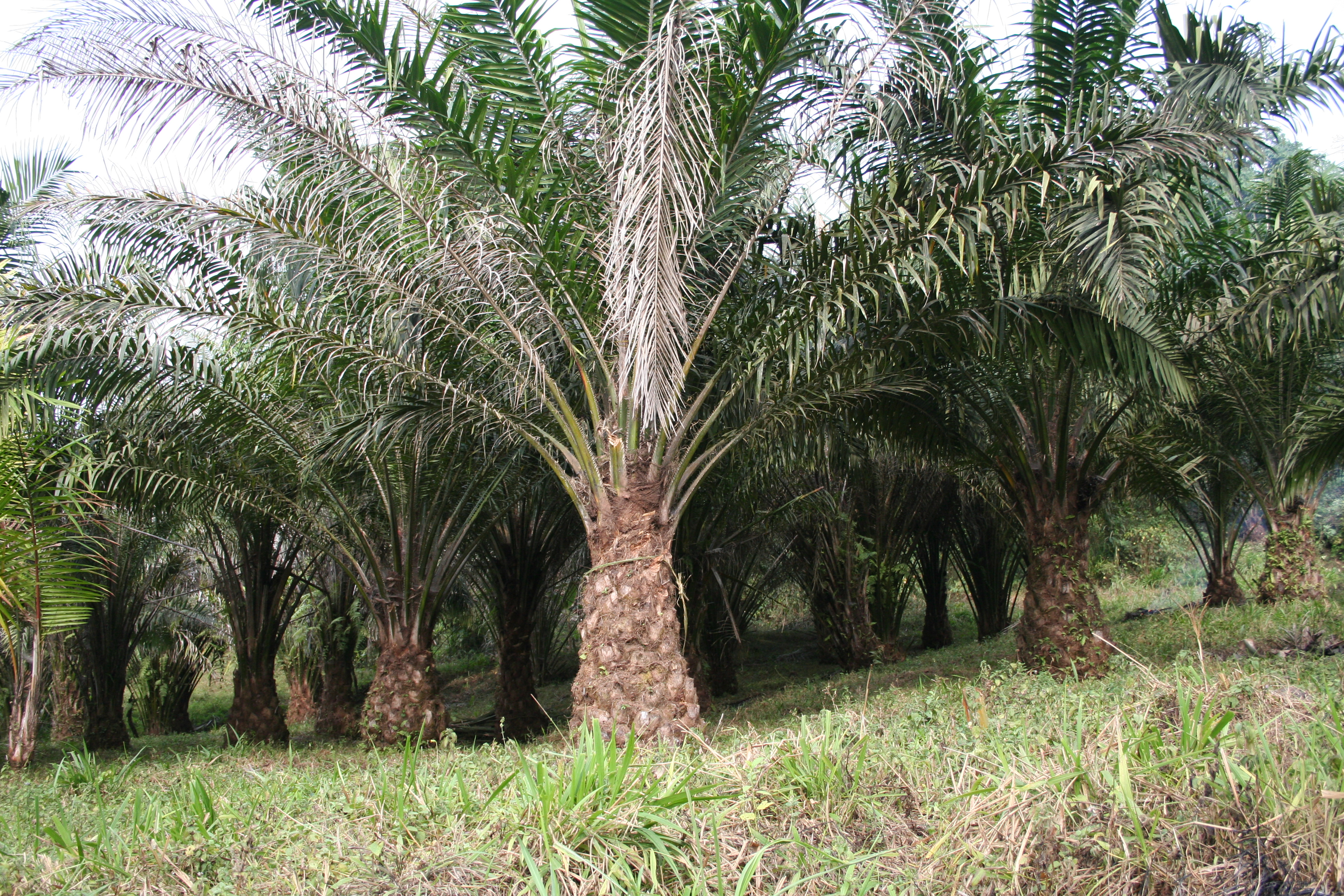
Oil palm tree (Elaeis guineensis)

The Institute of Applied Science and Technology has been investigating rice husk for combustion, and vegetable oils (palm, coconut, jathropa, wastes) for biodiesel production, with large scale palm oil based production facilities in Wauna, Region 1. Development of a national Agro-Energy Policy has been reported, but information has not been updated since 2008.

== Biogas ==
The GEA reports small scale biogas production at 5 sites in Georgetown, Linden and Berbice, using mostly low-cost polyethylene-film tube digesters of plug-flow digesters. Many have been supported by IDB and the Institute of Private Enterprise Development. Pay-back periods of 3-7 months have been reported. A similar digester has been built in Bina Hill, but this digester is currently not operational.

== Projects and initiatives ==
=== 2004-2010 Unserved Areas Electrification Programme ===
The Government of Guyana implemented this programme with loan support from the Inter-American Development Bank (IDB) in 2004, to make improvements for Guyana Power and Light, and a hinterland energy component, using Solar Home Systems and community-based systems for schools to provide community and household access to electricity. The systems in Yarakita, Capoey, Kurukubaru and Muritaro comprised a 125 W monocrystalline panel and flooded lead acid battery. The schools in these villages received 250 W system with inverter, 8x25W bulbs and 120 V outlets. Another 12 villages received a total of 1200 SHS with 65 W panels and maintenance-free AGM battery, and one 260 W system for the school. Wind speed measurements were carried out in Orealla, Jawalla, Campbelletown and Yupukari, but wind power potential was found to be insufficient

=== 2009 Rural Electrification Project ===
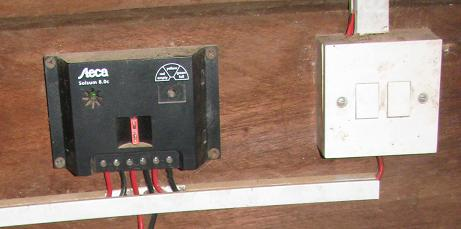
Solar controller used in SHS

This project was funded by CIDA, implemented jointly by the Latin American Energy Organisation (OLADE) and the University of Calgary School of Business. The Guyana Energy Agency was the national supporting agency. In the village of Wowetta the following were installed; 49 Solar Home Systems (40W MC Kyocera panel, 92Ah Deka AGM battery, 8 Amp Steca controller, one 7W and one 15W CFL 12V lightbulb), a freezer for the village shop (SunDanzer 24V freezer, 2x130W Kyocera panels, a 15 Amp Steca controller and two 12V lightbulbs), a Lorenz submersible water pump for irrigation of vegetable garden (four 85W panels, Lorenz 200 pump controller), an electric 110 V cassava mill powered by a diesel generator, and a joinery shop. A field visit in May 2011 showed that the SHS and solar freezer were working well, but the water pump was defective. In addition, due to several overcast days the freezer was temporarily emptied due to insufficient cooling.

=== 2006-2008 Hinterland Electrification by Renewable Energy Pilot Project ===
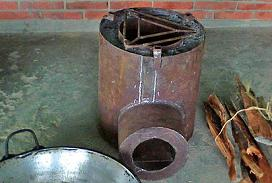
Efficient wood stove used in Orealla

The United Nations Development Programme and Office of Prime Minister installed 3 PV systems for income generation, one in Wauna to support a peanut processing business, one in Kato for a vaccine freezer and battery charging service and one in Orealla to support Fruit Cheese production. Also, efficient woodstoves were introduced in Orealla and Kato to reduce firewood consumption and respiratory illnesses from smoke inhalation. Wind measurement was carried out in Paramakatoi, but proved insufficient for wind power generation In Kato an opportunity was identified to use small hydro-power at the Chiung River to operate a water pump for irrigation purposes, and a prefeasibility study was carried out. In 2011 the hydro-power option is pursued by OPM and under EU support to provide the school in Kato with electricity and irrigation for the nearby fields.

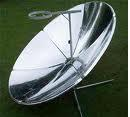
Parabolic solar cooker

The UNDP further expanded on this in 2011-2012 and 2013–2015 by a needs assessment survey carried out in Regions 1 and 7 to identify specific energy needs and potential energy sources.

=== Solar home light kits ===
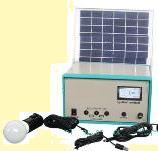
Portable solar light kit

In 2009 the Guyana Energy Agency and Office of Prime Minister in collaboration with Ministry of Amerindian Affairs provided 1000 portable solar light kits to 19 Villages in Regions 1,2,7,8 and 9. The kit consists of a 15W panel, a charge control cabinet containing a 20Ah battery and three 11W CFL light bulbs. In 2011 another 100 solar light kits were procured, with new design and LED light bulbs.

=== 2011 Hinterland Electrification Programme ===
In 2011 the government made plans to invest more on distributed PV technology by deploying 11.000 Solar Home Systems (65W) to mostly Amerindian Hinterland and riverine communities as part of the Low Carbon Development Strategy (LCDS). The systems will be equipped with maintenance-free AGM batteries. Due to delays in accessing funding by the Guyana REDD+ Investment Fund (GRIF) the acquired equipment will be paid from the national treasury and the government will seek retroactive financing.

The project will also include training the communities to install and maintain their systems.

=== NGOs and privately funded projects ===
This German foundation Eerepami Regenwaldstiftung has carried out several renewable energy initiatives in Guyana. In Bina Hill and Shell Beach 1 kW PV systems have been installed, and the Bina Hill system will later be extended to 11 kW. In Annai and Agatash a set of 100 solar lights have been distributed. The foundation also encourages other hinterland activities and volunteering.

After identifying the lack of knowledge on PV technology the Peace Corps has initiated efforts to provide engineering support to specific locations in the Hinterland as well as prepare training for community volunteers in 2011. Support consisted of 2 volunteers stationed in Region 1 and Region 9.

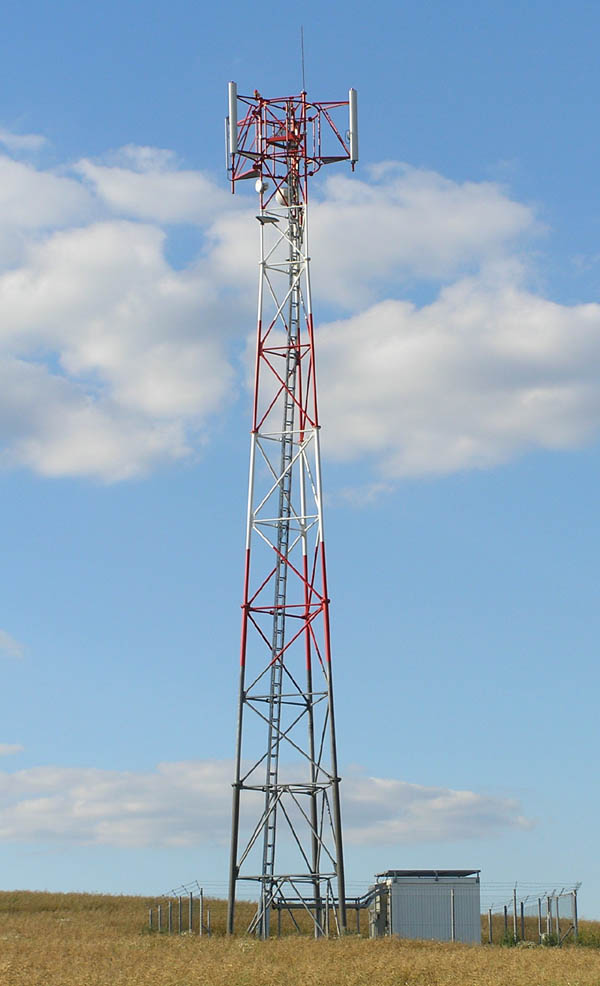
Mobile Base Station

Mobile operators (Digicel and GTT) are expanding their coverage to off-grid areas and thus require electricity for the base stations. As conventional diesel generators face maintenance and fuel cost issues and the price of PV equipment is declining, it is envisaged that mobile base stations will be powered by PV systems. Digicel has already installed PV power systems in the villages of Wakapau, Kwebanna, Red Hill and Matthews Ridge, 58 miles, Mahdia Trail, Mahdia, Port Kaituma and Mabaruma. To support local communities and improve the mobile communication potential a phone charging service is provided to the communities free of charge.

Holiday cabin using solar power

Several private users and tourism businesses have installed renewable energy systems in the Hinterland. PV electricity, typically using diesel backup, is in use at least at Iwokrama Field Station, Surama Ecolodge, Gamell's Back Shop (Kumaka), Adel's Eco-Resort, Arrow Point and Karinambo.

The stalled Amaila Falls Hydro Energy project was projected to create electrical power is 165MW, mainly for mining.

=== CREDP/GIZ ===
The Caricom Renewable Energy Development Programme (CREDP) is a joint project of CARICOM and the German International Cooperation GIZ, formerly GTZ, delivering technical expertise to renewable energy projects. CREDP seeks to remove barriers for the use of Renewable Energy and application of Energy Efficiency measures in the Caribbean Region. In Guyana, CREDP is currently providing technical support to a small hydro-power project in Kato, as well as a business in Georgetown in utilising PV.

=== SIDS DOCK ===
The SIDS DOCK Support Programme is a joint initiative of UNDP and the World Bank, developed in close consultation with the Alliance of Small Island States. This initiative aims to support Small Island Developing States (SIDS) to transition to low-emission economies through development and deployment of renewable energy resources and promotion of greater energy efficiency. An important component is the one-stop-shop function, facilitating SIDS's access to global financial flows, especially from the carbon market enabling them to fund transformational energy policies.

The programme was from July 2011 to December 2012. Funding of US$14.5 million was mobilized from the Government of Denmark.

== See also ==
- Electricity sector in Guyana
- Off-the-grid
- Rural development
