= 1996 World Monuments Watch =

The World Monuments Watch is a flagship advocacy program of the New York–based private non-profit organization World Monuments Fund (WMF) and American Express aimed at identifying and preserving the world’s most important endangered cultural landmarks. It targets selected sites for immediate action, to call attention to the need for innovative approaches to protect threatened sites throughout the world.

== Selection process ==
Every two years, the program publishes a select list known as the Watch List of 100 Most Endangered Sites that is in urgent need of preservation funding and protection. The sites are nominated by governments, private organizations active in the field of heritage conservation, and concerned individuals. An independent panel of international experts then convene to evaluate and select 100 candidates from these entries to be part of the Watch List, based on the significance of the urgency of its situation, the viability of proposed remedies, and the site's overall significance. WMF and American Express award grants to sites included on the Watch List through the WMF Fund, which is composed of donations from corporate, individual and foundation sponsors. These grants are meant to support activities such as strategic planning, emergency and technical assistance, educational and local fund raising programs, and conservation treatment.

== 1996 Watch List ==
The 1996 World Monuments Watch List of 100 Most Endangered Sites was launched on August 4, 1995.

=== List by country/territory ===
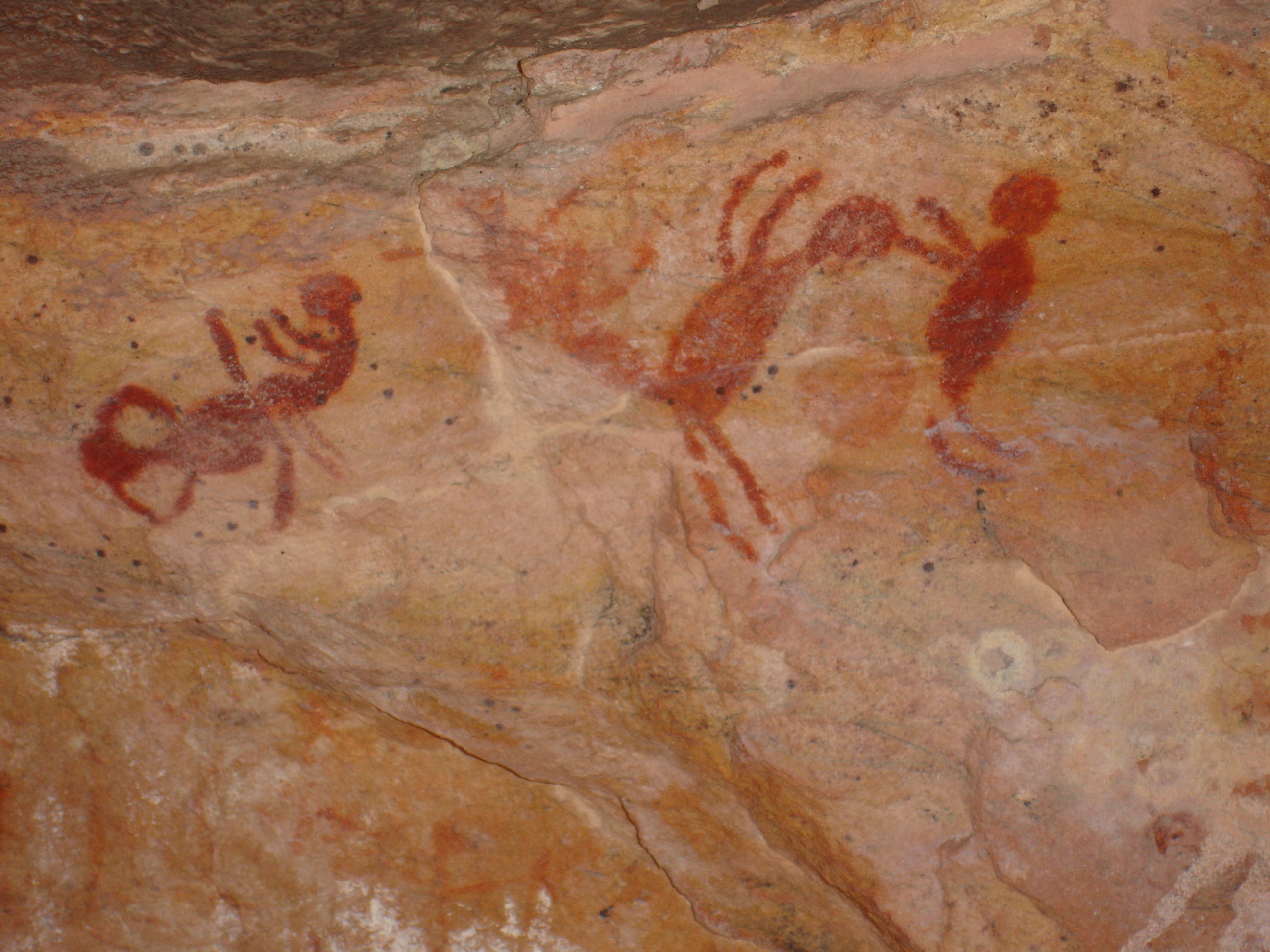
Brazil's Serra da Capivara National Park has the largest concentration of prehistoric small farms on the continent.

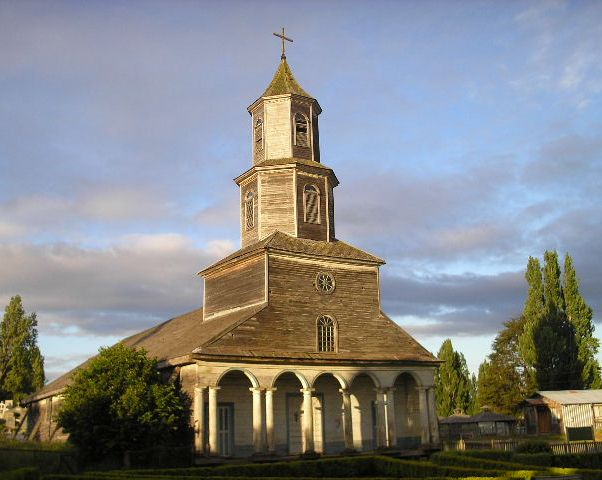
The Churches of Chiloé in Chile are a unique architectural phenomenon in the Americas and one of the most prominent buildings of Chilota architecture.

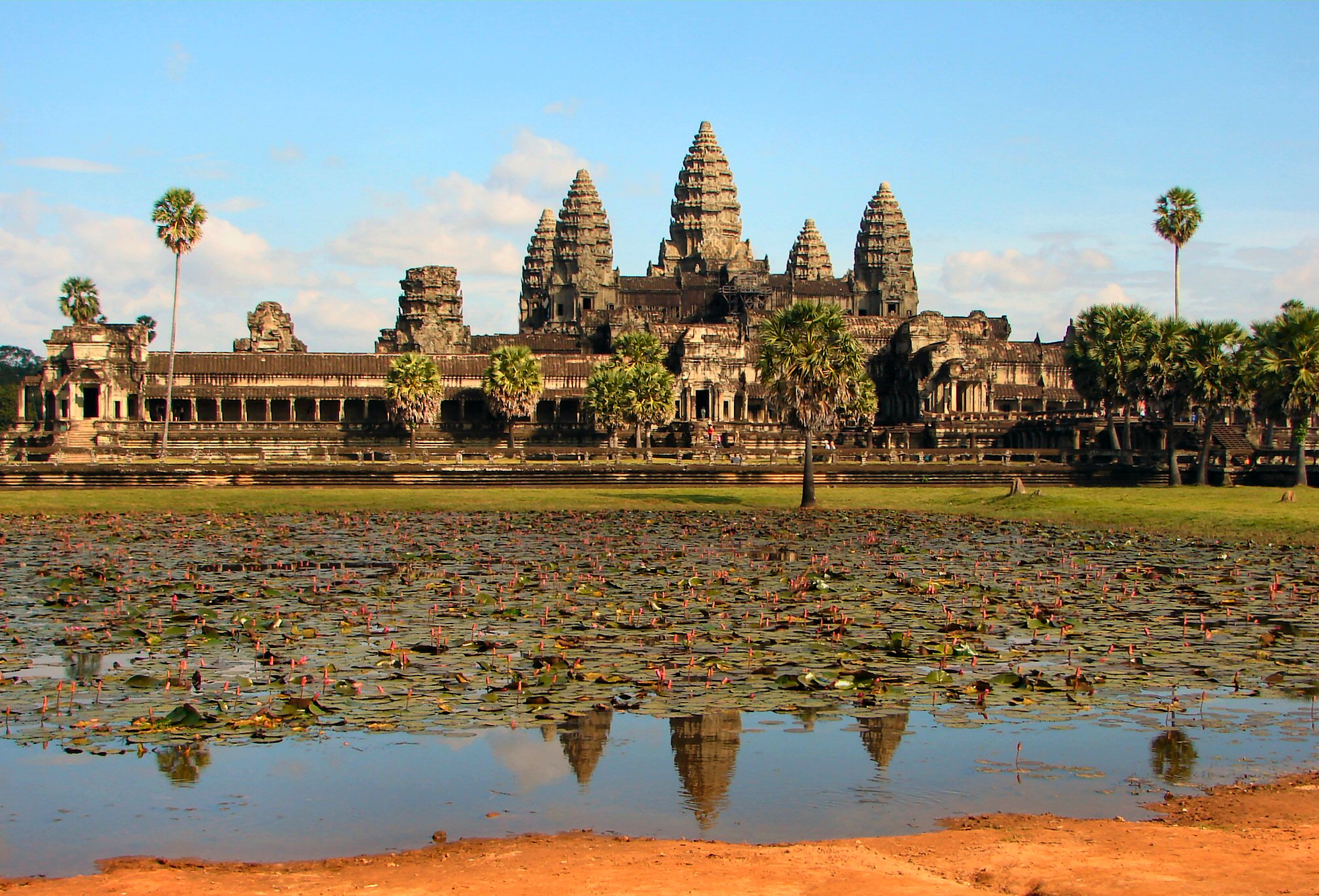
The temples of the Angkor area in Cambodia comprise the most significant site of Khmer architecture.

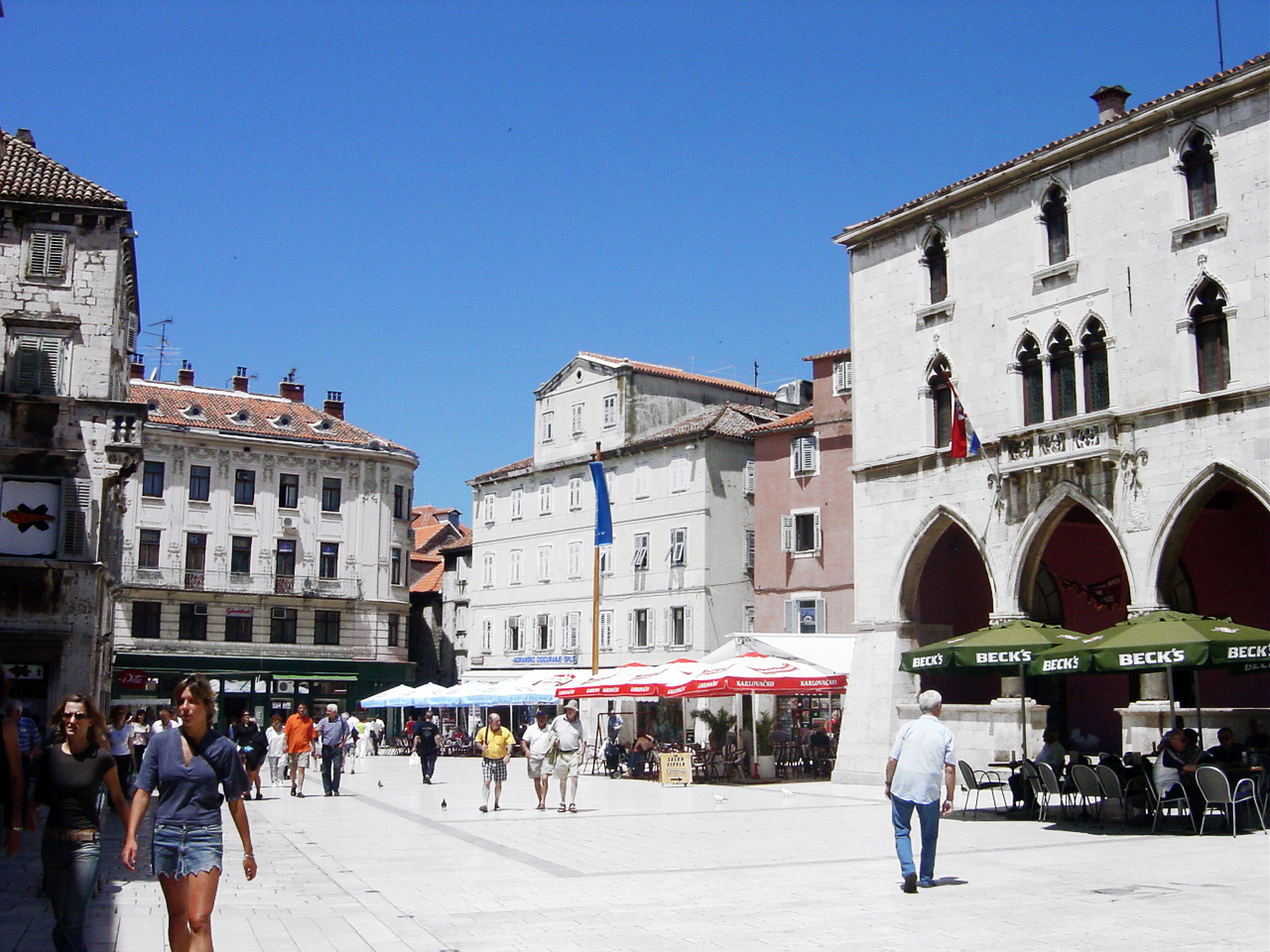
The historic center of Split, centered on Diocletian’s splendid palace, is today the cultural heart of the Croatian city.

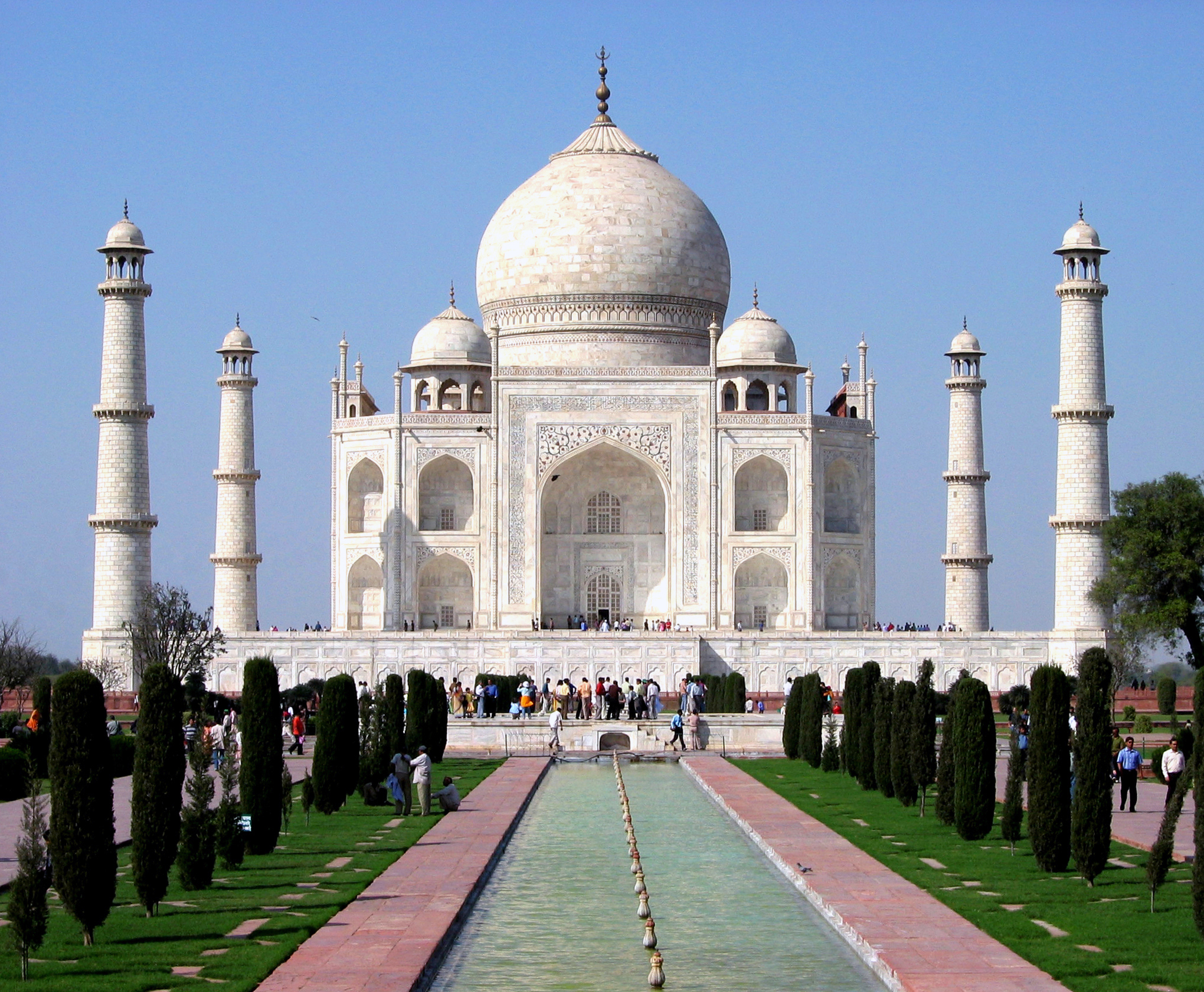
India’s Taj Mahal is considered the finest example of Mughal architecture.

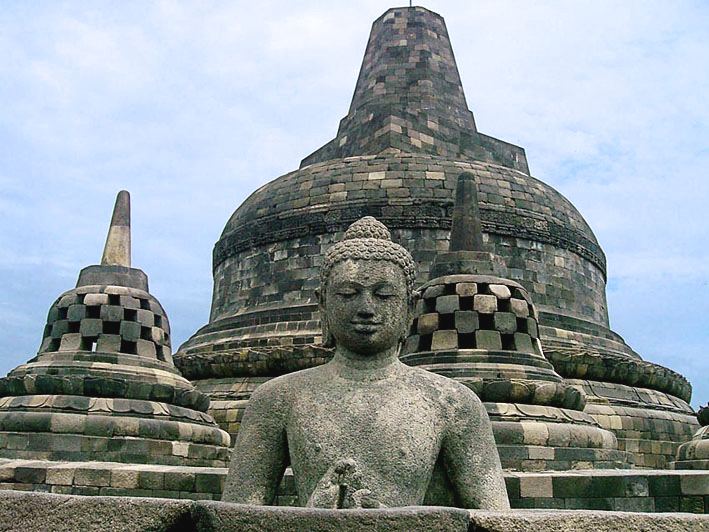
Borobudur, a shrine to the Lord Buddha and a place for Buddhist pilgrimage, is Indonesia's single most visited tourist attraction.

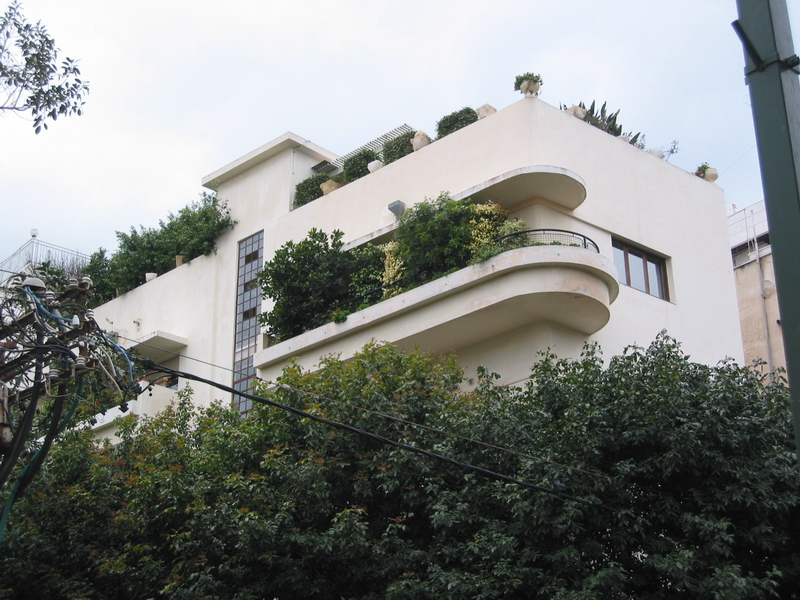
In 2003, UNESCO proclaimed the White City in Tel Aviv, Israel a World Heritage Site, as "an outstanding example of new town planning and architecture in the early 20th century."

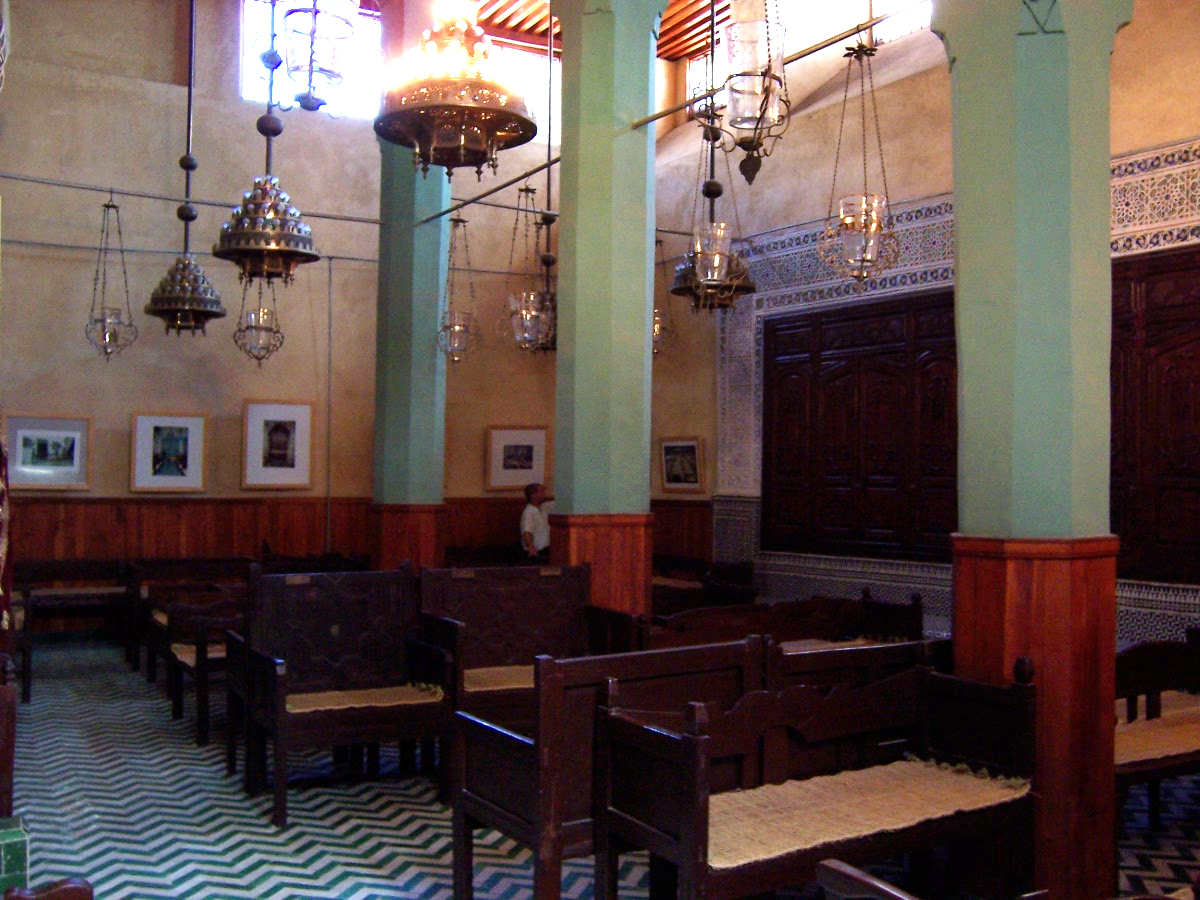
The Ibn Danan synagogue contains perhaps the only complete set of Moroccan synagogue fittings in existence.

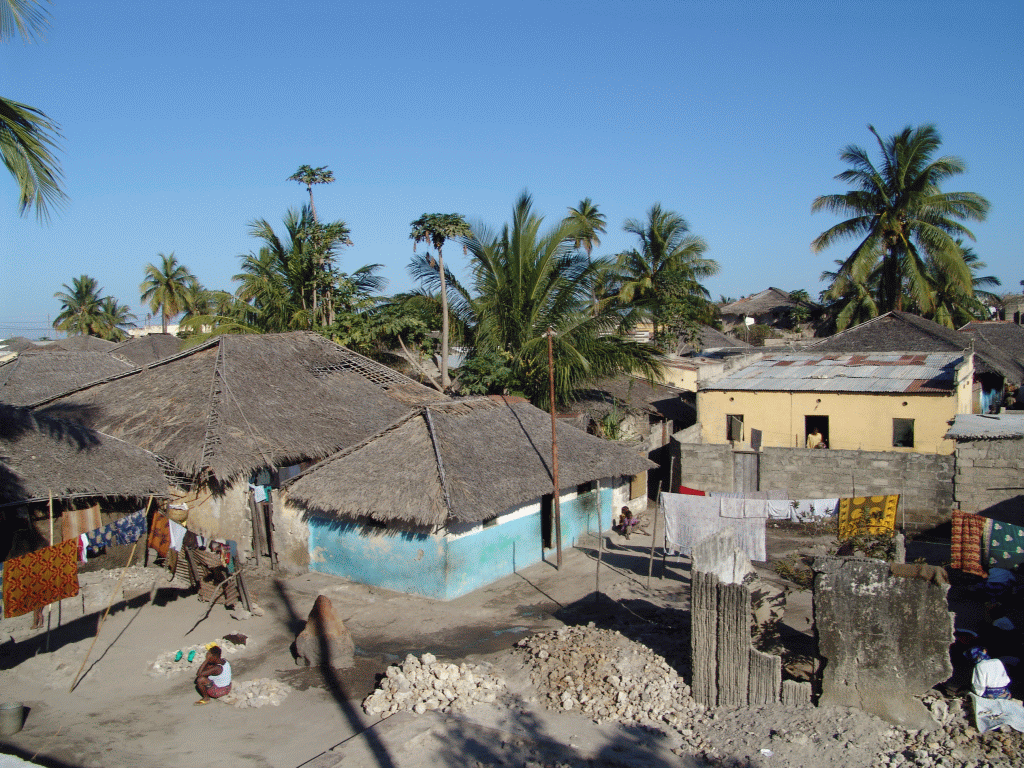
Typhoon Nadia in 1994 and an influx of refugees escaping civil war on the mainland have strained the already stressed architectural environment of Mozambique Island.

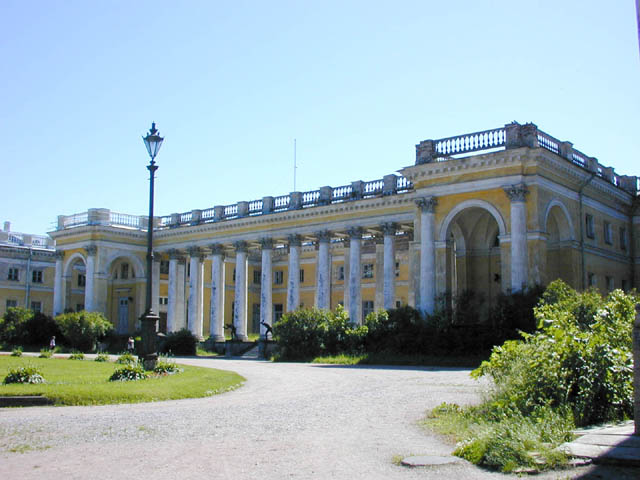
Russia’s Alexander Palace is primarily known as the favoured residence of the last Russian Emperor, Nicholas II, and his family.

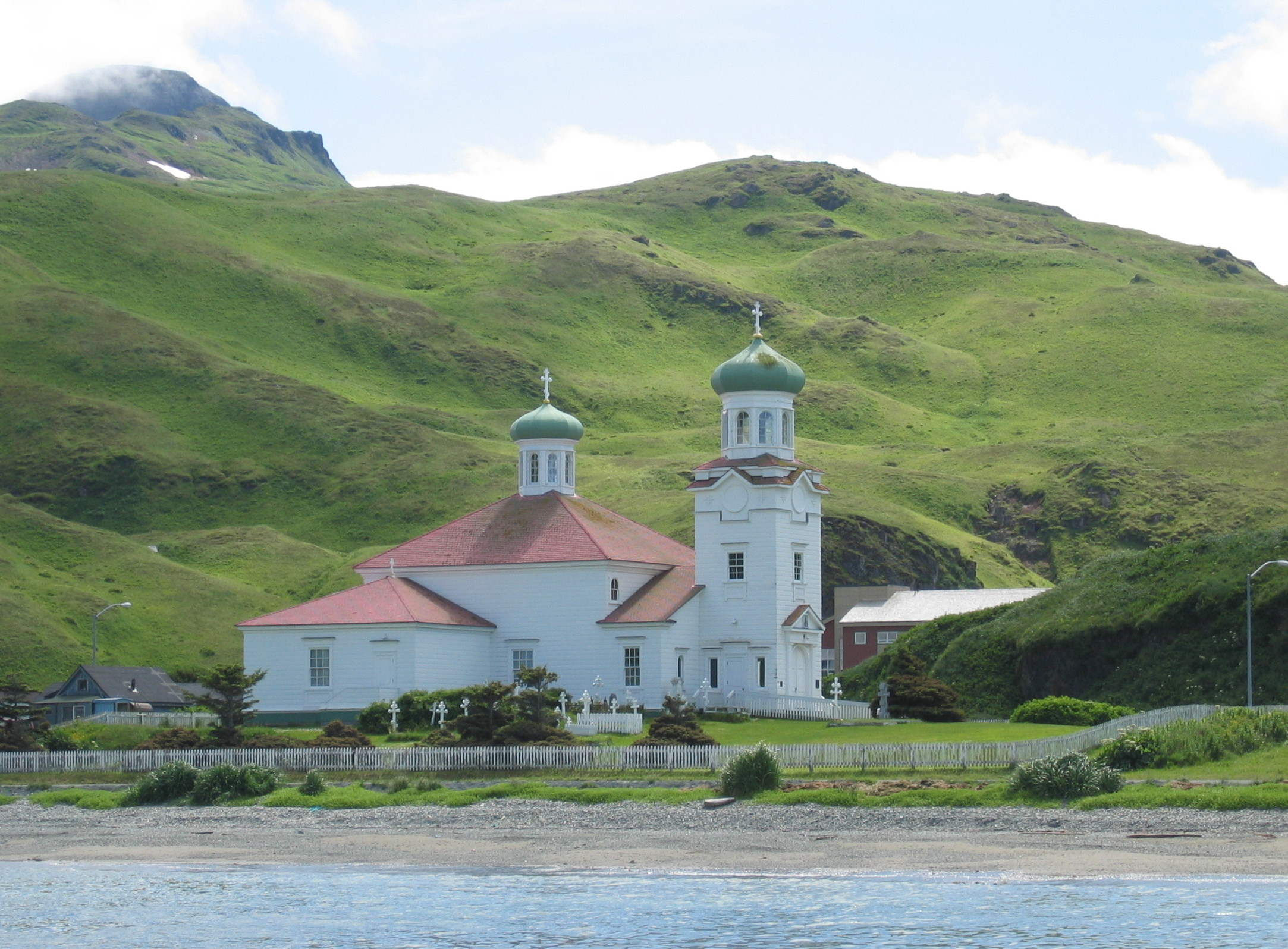
The Church of the Holy Ascension played a significant role in evangelizing the indigenous people in then Russian Alaska.

Number^{[A]}	Country/Territory	Site^{[B]}	Location^{[C]}	Period^{[C]}
1	Albania	Butrint Archaeological Site	Sarande	8th century BC–18th century AD
2	Argentina	San Ignacio Miní	San Ignacio	17th century
3	Austria	Belvedere Gardens	Vienna	1700–1721
4	Austria	Franciscan Church	Vienna	1603–1742
5	Barbados	Morgan Lewis Sugar Mill	St. Andrew	18th century
6	Belgium	Tour and Taxis (transport hub)	Brussels	1897–1907
7	Belize	El Pilar Archaeological Reserve	Belize River Area	5th century BC–10th century AD
8	Benin	Royal Palaces of Abomey	Abomey	1645–1906
9	Bosnia and Herzegovina	Village of Počitelj	Počitelj	1444–present
10	Brazil	Serra da Capivara National Park	Sao Raimundo Nonato, Piaui	Stone Age
11	Bulgaria	Madara Horseman	Kaspichan	8th–9th century
12	Cambodia	Angkor Archaeological District	Siem Reap	9th–13th century
13	Chile	Churches of Chiloe	Chiloe Archipelago	17th–20th century
14	Chile	Elevators of Valparaiso	Valparaiso	1883–1915
15	Chile	Orongo	Easter Island	15th–18th century
16	China	Liao dynasty Site	Chi Feng City, Inner Mongolia	916–1125
17	China	Namseling Manor	Drachi, Tibet	14th century
18	China	San Xing Dui Site	Guang Han City, Sichuan Province	5th–3rd millennium BC
19	Croatia	Lopud Franciscan Monastery	Dubrovnik-Neretva County	1400–1430
20	Croatia	Old City Harbor	Dubrovnik	13th–19th century
21	Croatia	Split Historic Center	Split	295–present
22	Croatia	Village of Tvrđa	Osijek	1730–present
23	Cuba	Convent of Santa Clara of Assisi	Santa Clara	1638–1644
24	Czech Republic	Český Krumlov Garden	Český Krumlov	1550–1575
25	Czech Republic	Kladruby Benedictine Monastery	Kladruby	1115–1775
26	Ecuador	Church of the Compañia	Quito	1605–1765
27	Egypt	Qa'itbay Sebil (Fountain House)	Cairo	1477–1478
28	France	Chateau Aqueduct	Castelnau-Pegayrolles	11th century
29	France	Saint-Emilion Monolithic Church	Saint-Emilion	11th–15th century
30	Georgia	Pitareti Monastic Complex	Tetritskaro District	1216–1222
31	Germany	Festspielhaus Hellerau	Dresden Hellerau	1911
32	Greece	Etz Hayim Synagogue	Hania, Crete	15th–19th century
33	Guyana	Moruka-Waini Cultural Landscape	Warao Settlements	5th millennium BC
34	Hungary	Royal Garden Pavilions	Budapest	1875–1882
35	India	Jaisalmer Fort	Rajasthan	12th century
36	India	Taj Mahal	Agra	1632–1643
37	Indonesia	Borobudur	Central Java	9th century
38	Ireland	Clonmacnoise New Graveyard	County Offaly	6th–13th century
39	Israel	Gemeindehaus	German Colony, Haifa	1869
40	Israel	The White City	Tel Aviv	1930–1939
41	Italy	Ancient Pompeii	Naples	1st century BC–AD 79
42	Italy	Bartolomeo Colleoni Monument	Venice	1488–1496
43	Italy	Garden of Villa Medici at Castello	Florence	1500–1799
44	Italy	Grottos of San Michele	Salerno	8th–9th century
45	Italy	Neopitagorica Basilica	Rome	1st century
46	Italy	Nero's Palace (Domus Aurea)	Rome	AD 64
47	Italy	Ruins on the River Centa	Albenga (Savona)	1st century BC–1st century AD
48	Italy	San Giacomo Maggiore Portico	Bologna	1477–1481
49	Italy	Santa Maria in Stelle	Verona	2nd–5th century
50	Italy	Sts. Ambrogio and Carlo al Corso	Rome	1612–1685
51	Italy	Temple of Hercules	Forum Boarium, Rome	179–142 BC
52	Jordan	Petra Archaeological Site	Wadi Mousa	1st–6th century
53	Jordan	Southern Temple	Petra, Wadi Mousa, Petra	100–599
54	Laos	Vat Sisaket	Vientiane	1819–25
55	Latvia	Abava Valley Cultural Landscape	Kurzeme	13th–19th century
56	Lebanon	Ancient Tyre	Tyre	3rd millennium BC–Present
57	Mali	Djenne-Djeno Archaeological Site	Djenne	3rd century BC–13th century AD
58	Mexico	Church of Jesus Nazareno	Atotonilco, Guanajuato	1740–1776
59	Mexico	Modern Mural Paintings	various cities	1920–1950
60	Mexico	San Juan de Ulua Fort	Veracruz	1535–1786
61	Mexico	Yucatan Indian Chapels	Yucatan Peninsula	16th–18th century
62	Mongolia	Bogd Khaan Palace Museum	Ulaanbaatar	1893–1903
63	Morocco	Medieval Sijilmassa	Rissani	757–1393
64	Morocco	Rabbi Shlomo Ibn Danan and Mansano Synagogues	Fez	17th century
65	Mozambique	Mozambique Island	Nampula Province	16th century – present
66	Nepal	Gombas of Upper Mustang	Lo Manthang, Mustang	15th century
67	Nepal	Teku Thapatali Monument Zone	Kathmandu	18th–19th century
68	Norway	Vaga Old Church	Vagamo, Oppland	12th century, 1625–1630
69	Pakistan	Tamba Wari	Indus River Delta, Sindh	11th century
70	Peru	Cusco Historic Center	Cusco	13th–17th century
71	Peru	Murals of Allauca Church	Rapaz	17th century
72	Philippines	Angono Petroglyphs	Rizal	3rd millennium BC
73	Poland	Debno Parish Church	Nowy Targ	15th century
74	Poland	Our Lady's Assumption Basilica	Kraków	13th–14th century
75	Poland	Prozna Street	Warsaw	1881–1912
76	Portugal	Côa Valley Petroglyphs	Vila Nova de Foz Côa	Stone Age
77	Romania	Constantin Brâncuși's Endless Column	Târgu Jiu	1937–1938
78	Romania	Roman Catholic Church	Ghelinţa	13th century
79	Russia	Alexander Palace	Tsarskoye Selo, St. Petersburg	1792–1796
80	Russia	Kizhi Pogost	Kizhi Island, Lake Onega	18th century
81	Russia	Paanajarvi Village	Kemi Province	14th century – present
82	Spain	Moorish Houses of Granada	Granada	14th–16th century
83	Suriname	Jodensavanne Archaeological Site	Redi Doti	1660–1830
84	Tanzania	Kilwa Kisiwani Portuguese Fort	Lindi Region	13th–15th century
85	Thailand	Ayuttaya and other flooded sites along Chao Praya River	Central Thailand	14th–18th century
86	Turkey	Ani Archaeological Site	Ocarli Koyu, Kars	3rd–14th century
87	Turkey	Çatalhöyük	Cumra, Konya	10th millennium BC
88	Turkey	Hagia Sophia	Istanbul	AD 532–563
89	Ukraine	Ancient Chersonesos	Sevastopol, Crimea	5th century BC–15th century AD
90	United States	Adobe Missions of New Mexico	New Mexico	17th–20th century
91	United States	Chaco Culture National Historic Park	McKinley County, New Mexico	900–1150
92	United States	Eastern State Penitentiary	Philadelphia, Pennsylvania	1822–1836
93	United States	Ellis Island	New York, New York	1892–1954
94	United States	Golden Gate Park Conservatory	San Francisco, California	1876–1878
95	United States	Holy Ascension Church	Unalaska, Alaska	1826–1896
96	United States	Lafayette Cemetery No. 1	New Orleans, Louisiana	1833–present
97	Vietnam	Minh Mang Tomb	Huế	1840
98	Vietnam	My Son Temple District	Duy Xuyen District	3rd–12th century
99	Yugoslavia	Subotica Synagogue	Subotica	1902
100	Zimbabwe	Khami National Monument	Bulawayo	Mid-15th century – mid-17th century

== Statistics by country/territory ==
The following countries/territories have multiple sites entered on the 1996 Watch List, listed by the number of sites:

Number of sites	Country/Territory
11	Italy
7	United States of America
4	Croatia and Mexico
3	Chile, China, Poland, Russia and Turkey
2	Austria, Czech Republic, France, India, Israel, Jordan, Morocco, Nepal, Peru, Romania and Vietnam

== Notes ==
A. Numbers list only meant as a guide on this article. No official reference numbers have been designated for the sites on the Watch List.
B. Names and spellings used for the sites were based on the official 1996 Watch List as published.
C. The references to the sites' locations were based on the official 1996 Watch List as published.
