= Moruka River =

- Location of the mouth in Guyana

Location
- Country: Guyana

Physical characteristics
- Mouth: Atlantic Ocean
  - coordinates: 7.669°N 58.782°W

The Moruka River or Moruca River is a river in the Barima-Waini region of northern Guyana.

The mouth of the river opens to the Atlantic Ocean. Mangrove forests make up the shoreline, turning into swampy savannah wetlands as it moves west. The Moruka River's water level varies dramatically depending on the season.

== Settlement ==
Around 5300 years ago, Warao people on the Moruka River developed the dugout canoe, making possible people travel in the Caribbean.

During their occupation period the Dutch maintained outposts on the Moruka River.

Settlements along the river include Santa Rosa, Kamwatta and Asakata.

== See also ==
- List of rivers of Guyana
- List of rivers of the Americas by coastline
