= Arakaka =

- Community
- Location in Guyana
- Coordinates: 7°35′N 60°01′W
- Country: Guyana
- Region: Barima-Waini

Population (2012)
  - Total: 196

Arakaka is a community in the Barima-Waini region of Guyana, standing on the Barima River and 12 miles southerly of Port Kaituma, at an altitude of 63 metres (209 feet).

It is the centre of the gold-bearing district, featuring lateritic-saprolitic deposits. Gold mining in the area has attracted international mining companies, such as Alicanto Minerals Ltd (Australia) and Barrick Gold Corporation (Canada).

The population of Arakaka varies according to the amount of mineral extraction in the region. Launches formerly ascended the river regularly to Arakaka, where a mining warden was stationed. Arakaka has a police outpost.

Matthews Ridge is a nearby settlement also in the Matarkai sub-region.

== Demographics ==
According to the 2012 population census, it had 196 inhabitants. This number varies according to the mineral extraction activity in the region.

Population by Occupation
Data	Officials	Professionals and technicians	Clergy	Commerce and Services	On. agricultural	On. industrial	Occup. elementals	S/D	Total
Population	0	6	0	101	10	5	64	87	276
