= Assakata =

Assakata Asakata
- Village
- Location in Guyana
- Coordinates: 7°44′0″N 59°4′0″W
- Country: Guyana
- Region: Barima-Waini

Population (2013)
  - Total: c.300

Assakata or Asakata is a village in Barima-Waini region, in the north of Guyana. Assakata is an Amerindian village inhabited by Warao and Lokono people, located in the swamps and marshes between the Barima and Pomeroon River.

== History ==
Assakata was founded in 1938 as the Assakata mission, and is part of the North West Amerindian District. Since 1996, the area is governed by the Moruca Land Council with Santa Rosa as the main settlement. The population as of 2013 is approximately 300 people spread over four settlements.

== Overview ==
The economy is based on subsistence farming. Loggers used to be active in the region, however the village council ended all agreements in 2012. The village has a primary school and a health care centre, however the nearest secondary school is in Santa Rosa. The community began receiving electricity in 2004 when a diesel generator was donated by Monty Niathally, proprietor of Variety Woods and Greenheart Limited.

== Bibliography ==
- Atkinson, Sharon (2016). Our Land, Our Life (PDF). Amerindian Peoples Association and Forest Peoples Programme. ISBN 978-0-9935190-7-9.
