= Region One =

Region One may refer to:

- The Barima-Waini region of Guyana
- Region One School District in Connecticut, USA
- Region 1 DVD
