= Whitewater, Guyana =

Whitewater Ho Ko
- Village
- Location in Guyana
- Coordinates: 8.1488°N 59.8852°W
- Country: Guyana
- Region: Barima-Waini
- Settled: 1966

Government
  - Toshao: Ernst Samuel

Population (2012)
  - Total: 1,220

Whitewater (Warao: Ho Ko sometimes spelled as White Water) is a village in the Barima-Waini Region of Guyana. Whitewater is located close to the border with Venezuela and is inhabited by Warao Amerindians.

== Overview ==
Whitewater was founded in 1966 by four families. It has developed rapidly and at the 2012 census, a population of 1,220 people was recorded. The village has seven satellites including Blackwater.

The economy of Whitewater is based on farming, fishing and craft making. The main crops are peanuts, ginger and cassava. The village has a primary school, however secondary education and health care are only provided in neighbouring Mabaruma. The village owns a school bus. Water is provided by wells. There is no electricity except for privately owned Diesel generators and solar panels. In May 2021, it was announced that the village will receive electricity. A traditional government has been established in the village. The toshao (village chief) as of 2021 is Ernst Samuel.

The Crisis in Venezuela has resulted in criminal gangs from Venezuela moving into the Whitewater area. In February 2018, a military post of the Guyana Defence Force was established in Whitewater to protect the border.
