= Baramita =

- Community
- Location in Guyana
- Coordinates: 7°21′N 60°29′W
- Country: Guyana
- Region: Barima-Waini

Government
  - Toshao: Sharmain Rambajue (2019)

Baramita, is a community in the Barima-Waini region of northern Guyana, standing about 20 miles west of Matthew's Ridge, at an altitude of 99 metres (328 feet).

It is one of the largest Amerindian settlements in the country. It is inhabited by the Kalina people. and the village council is responsible for 22 satellite villages as well. The total population of the indigenous area is 3,500 people. Baramita could only be easily reached only by air, however a road has been built to link it with Matthew's Ridge. The main economic activity in the village is mining and subsistence farming.
