= Morawhanna =

- Village
- Location in Guyana
- Coordinates: 8°16′N 59°45′W
- Country: Guyana
- Region: Barima-Waini

Population (2012)
  - Total: 203
- Time zone: UTC-04:00 (GYT)

Morawhanna is a small Atlantic coast village in northern Guyana, on the left side of the Barima River, near to Venezuela.

The 2012 census had a population count of 203, mostly Amerindians. It has a secondary school, with nursery and secondary departments, and a health post. Major economic activities include fishing and crab-catching.

Morawhanna was declared a port-of-entry in the mid-1950s, and developed to facilitate the export of manganese from Matthew's Ridge and Port Kaituma to Trinidad and Tobago. This was done until the early 1970s, when the manganese company closed its operations. In the 1980s, it was converted into Morawhanna fish port complex, a now-defunct plan for local fish processing. The port serves as a rest-point for ferry services.

The area suffers regular flooding from the Barima River and lacks drainage to handle it. The port sees major oil smuggling from Venezuela, which resulted in closure of a GuyOil fuel farm in the 1990s. The area also has high numbers of Venezuelan migrants.

Other villages near Morawhanna include Smith Creek and Imbotero.
