= Kwebanna =

Village in Barima-Waini region, Guyana

- Village
- Location in Guyana
- Coordinates: 7.48824190°N 59.65644940°W
- Country: Guyana
- Region: Barima-Waini

Population (2012)
  - Total: 658

Kwebanna is an Amerindian village in Barima-Waini region, in the north of Guyana. Kwebanna is connected by road to Kumaka, Barima-Waini.

== Economy ==
In the 1990s, logging companies began exploiting timber in the area. The area is a producer of cabbage and sweet cassava. In December 2018, construction began of a $26 million cassava flour processing factory in the village. The Ministry of Social Protection's Co-operative Society Department overlooked the establishment of the Kwebanna Farmers’ Co-operative in the village.
