= Kamwatta Hill =

- Village
- Location in Guyana
- Coordinates: 8°07′N 59°51′W
- Country: Guyana
- Region: Barima-Waini

Government
  - Toshao: Maurice Henry

Population (2012)
  - Total: 565

Kamwatta Hill is a community in the Barima-Waini Region, in northern Guyana. Kamwatta is an Amerindian village inhabited by Warao and Lokono people.

Kamwatta Hill is located at an altitude of 34 m (114 feet). Its population as of 2012 is 565 inhabitants. The economy is based on subsistence farming. Kamwatta Hill has a health centre and a primary school, however secondary education is provided in Wauna or Hosororo. The community began receiving electricity in 2006, when a diesel-powered generator was donated by Mr. Monty Niathally, proprietor of Variety Woods and Greenheart Limited.

== Bibliography ==
Atkinson, Sharon (2016). OUR LAND, OUR LIFE (PDF). Amerindian Peoples Association and Forest Peoples Programme. ISBN 978-0-9935190-7-9.
