= Barima River =

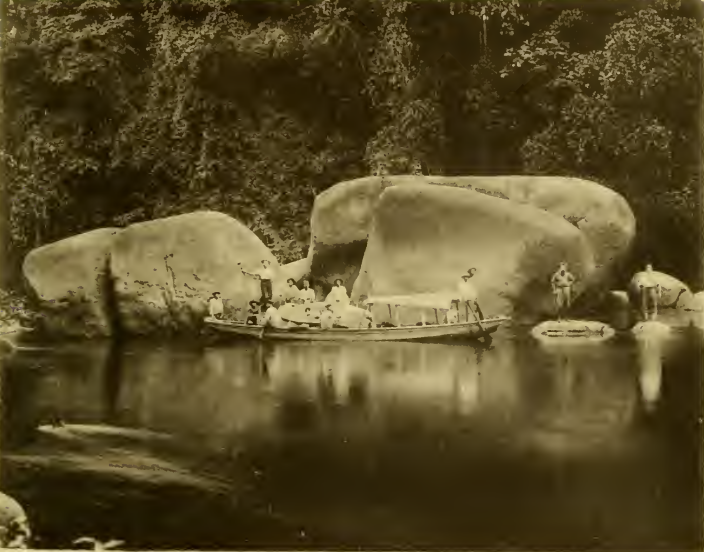
- Arawatta Rock in the Barima River

- Location of mouth

Location
- Country: Guyana, Venezuela

Physical characteristics
- Mouth
  - location: Barima Point
  - coordinates: 8°35′N 60°25′W

The Barima River is a tributary of the Orinoco River, entering 6 kilometres (4 mi) from the Atlantic Ocean. It originates from the Imataka Mountains in Guyana, flowing for approximately 340 kilometres (210 mi) before entering Venezuela about 80 kilometres (50 mi) from its mouth.

== Features ==
Early recorded explorations of the Barima were made by Robert Hermann Schomburgk, which was mapped as far as the tributary Rocky River.

The head of the Barima rises in a steep gorge of the Imataka mountains, 950 ft (290 m) above sea level. Near the Duquari Creek, the Arawatta Rock, a distinct large granite rock, is located.

== Settlements ==
Mabaruma, Koriabo, and Morawhanna are Barima-Waini Region communities on the Barima River.

== See also ==
- Corocoro Island
