= Santa Rosa, Guyana =

Santa Rosa
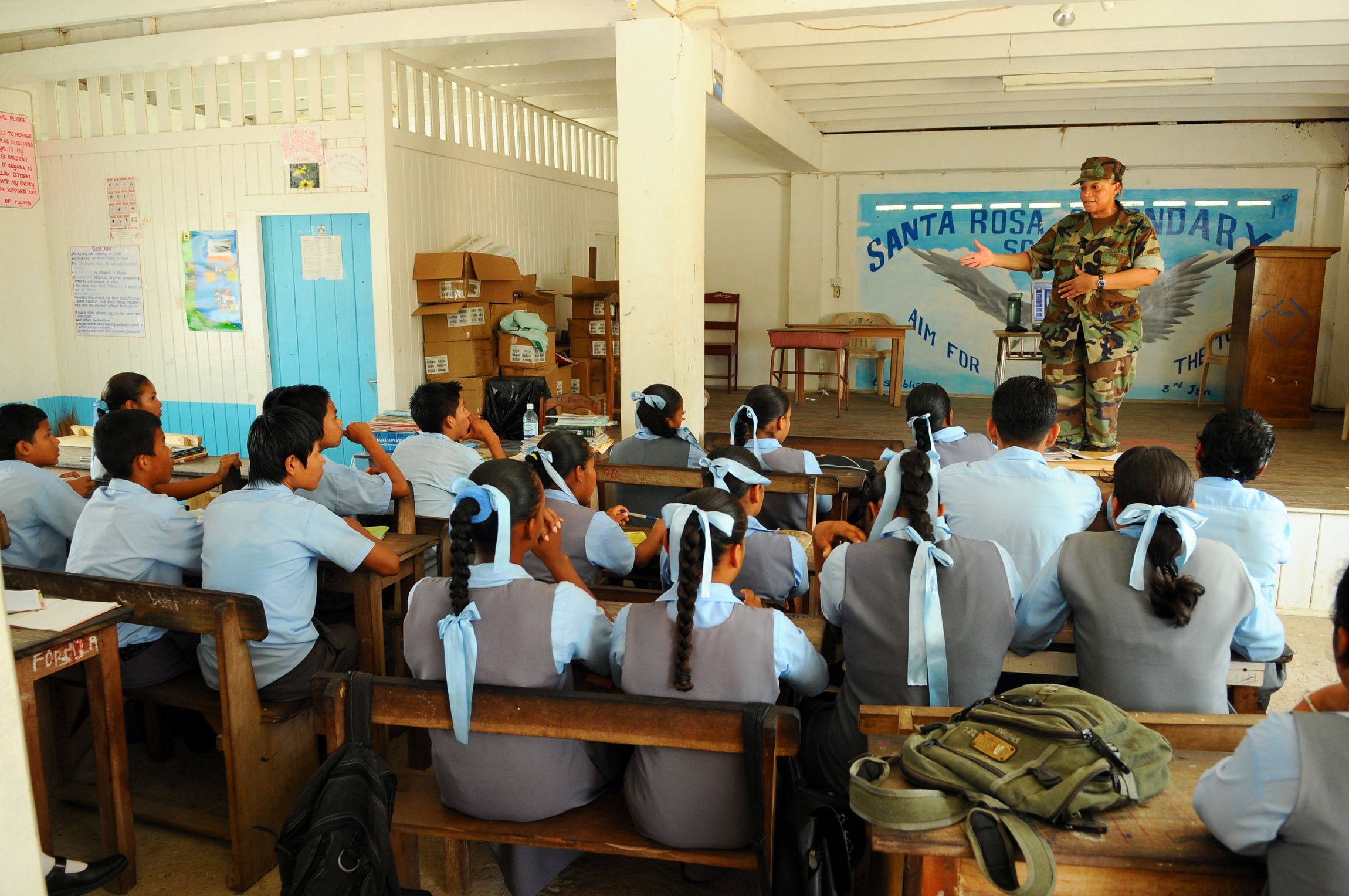
- Santa Rosa Secondary School

- Location in Guyana
- Coordinates: 7°39′0″N 58°57′0″W
- Country: Guyana
- Region: Barima-Waini

Population (2012)
  - Total: 913

Santa Rosa is a community in the Barima-Waini region of northern Guyana. Santa Rosa mission was established in 1840, and is one of the earliest Catholic Missions in Guyana. The village is part of the North West Amerindian District.

== Overview ==
The population of the mostly Lokono village and the mission is 913 people as of 2012, however the area has a population of 6,046 people as of 2013, making Santa Rosa is the largest Amerindian settlement in Guyana. The village is made from eleven settlements on wetlands on the Moruka River. As of 1996, the area is governed by the Moruca Land Council with Santa Rosa as the main settlement.

The community began receiving electricity in 2004 when a diesel-powered generator was donated by Mr. Monty Niathally, proprietor of Variety Woods and Greenheart Limited.

Santa Rosa contains a secondary school, Santa Rosa Secondary School, established in 1991, and a health centre. (The first, North West Secondary School in Mabaruma, was set up in 1965.) The economy is mainly based on subsistence farming.

== Notable people ==
- Stephen Campbell (1897–1966), first Amerindian member of Parliament.

== Bibliography ==
Atkinson, Sharon (2016). OUR LAND, OUR LIFE (PDF). Amerindian Peoples Association and Forest Peoples Programme. ISBN 978-0-9935190-7-9.
