= Hosororo =

- Village
- Location in Guyana
- Coordinates: 8°10′N 59°48′W
- Country: Guyana
- Region: Barima-Waini

Population (2012)
  - Total: 723

Hosororo is a community in the Barima-Waini region of northern Guyana, on the west bank of the Aruka River, 10 km (6.2 mi) from the river's mouth, and three miles from Mabaruma.

It is known for its production of organic cocoa and is home to a nursery and propagation centre.

The Arawak started to settle in the area about 3,500 years ago. The village known for its fertile soils, and is the earliest known site of cassava cultivation by Amerindians in Guyana. In 2016, Horosoro was joined with Mabaruma into a single town.

Aubrey Williams, the abstract expressionist painter, who was banished to Hosororo as a result of his activism for the sugar farmers, was inspired by the Amerindian art and culture he found here.
