= Koriabo =

- Village
- Location in Guyana
- Coordinates: 7°37′N 59°38′W
- Country: Guyana
- Region: Barima-Waini

Population (2012)
  - Total: 565

Koriabo is a community in the Barima-Waini region of Guyana, standing at an altitude of 36 metres. Barima and Koriba form an Amerindian community which is mainly inhabited by Warao people with a minority of Lokono and Kalina people.

Dutch plantations were established in the area in the 1760s. Koriabo was established as a mission in 1946. The economy is based on subsistence farming. Gold mining in the area is threatening the water supply.

== Bibliography ==
Atkinson, Sharon (2016). OUR LAND, OUR LIFE (PDF). Amerindian Peoples Association and Forest Peoples Programme. ISBN 978-0-9935190-7-9.
