= Kumaka, Barima-Waini =

Kumaka
- Village
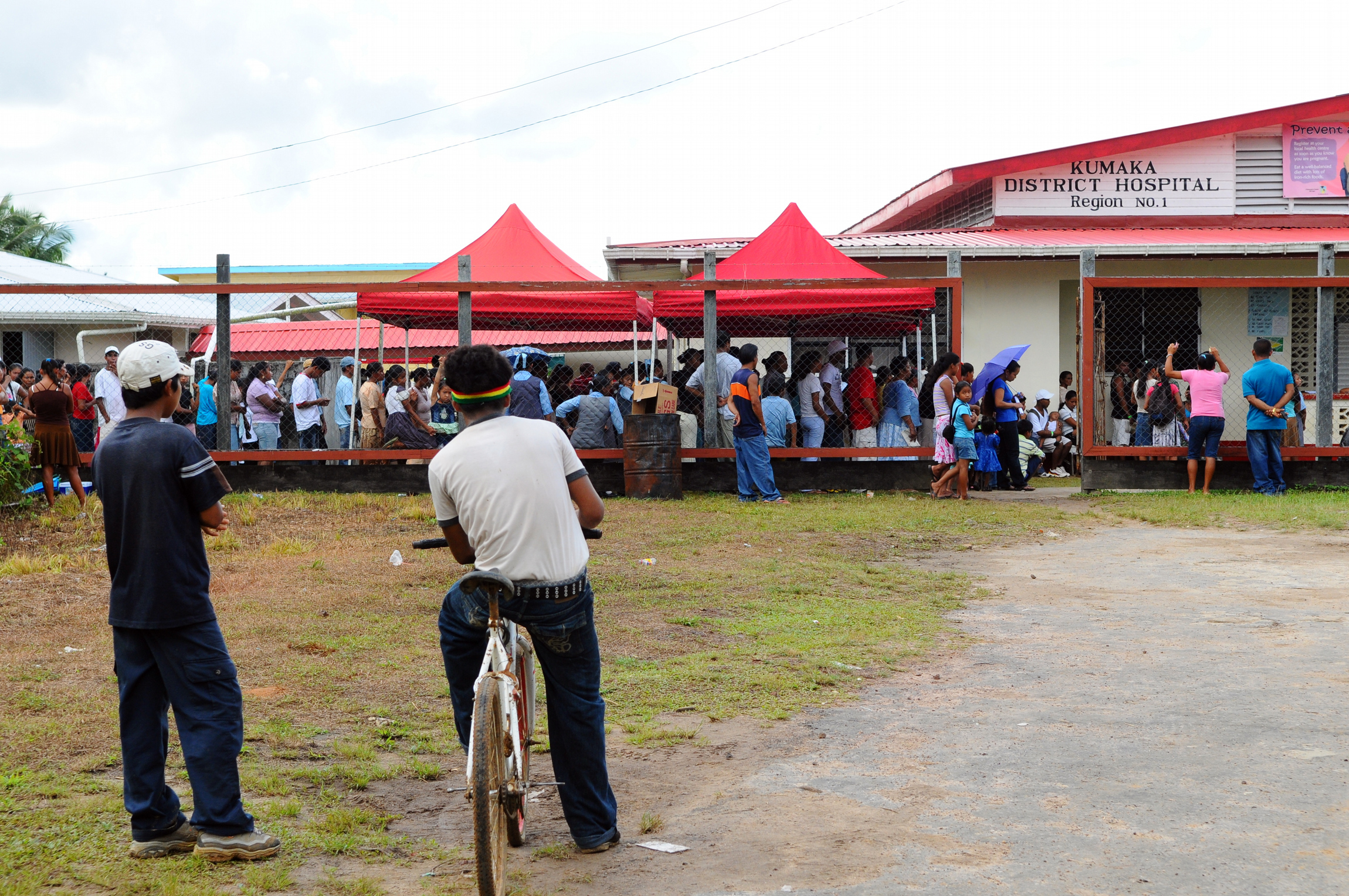
- Kumaka District Hospital

- Location in Guyana
- Coordinates: 7°39′N 58°57′W
- Country: Guyana
- Region: Barima-Waini

Population (2012)
  - Total: 497

Kumaka is a community in Barima-Waini region, in northern Guyana.

Kumaka stands about 35 km (22 mi) southeasterly of Baramanni and about 18 km (11 mi) inland from the Atlantic coast, and at an altitude of 30 m (98 ft). Kumaka is site of Kumaka District Hospital. It adjoins the village of Santa Rosa, and is the business centre of the community.
