= Warao people =

Indigenous people inhabiting northeastern Venezuela and western Guyana

Warao
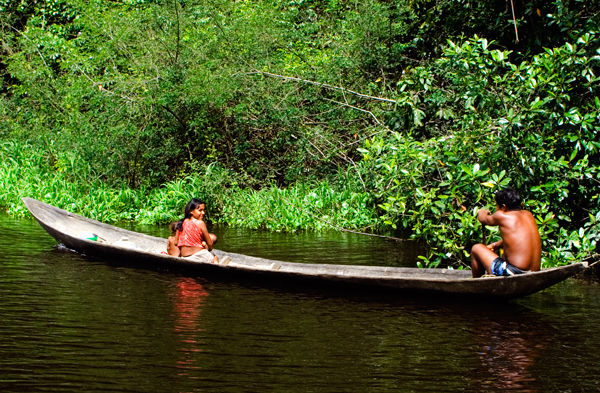
- A Warao family in their canoe.

Total population
- c. 54,771

Regions with significant populations
- Venezuela: 49,271 (2011)
- Guyana: c. 5,000
- Suriname: c. 500
- Trinidad and Tobago: unknown

Languages
- Warao, Spanish, English, Guyanese Creole, Dutch, Sranan Tongo

Religion
- Traditional beliefs, Christianity

The Warao are an Indigenous Amerindian people inhabiting northeastern Venezuela, Trinidad and Tobago, Guyana, and Suriname. Alternative common spellings of Warao are Waroa, Guarauno, Guarao, and Warrau. The term Warao translates as "the boat people", after the Warao's lifelong and intimate connection to the water. Most Warao inhabit Venezuela's Orinoco Delta region, with smaller numbers in neighbouring Guyana, Trinidad and Tobago, and Suriname. With a population of 49,271 people in Venezuela during the 2011 census, they were the second largest Indigenous group after the Wayuu people. They speak an agglutinative language, Warao.

== Lifestyle ==
=== Transportation ===
Warao use canoes as their main form of transportation. Other modes, such as walking, are hampered by the hundreds of streams, rivulets, marshes, and high waters by the Orinoco River. Warao babies, toddlers, and small children are famed for their ability to hold tight to their mothers' necks, as well as to paddle. They often learn to swim before they learn to walk.

The Warao use two types of canoes. Bongos, which carry up to 5 people, are built in an arduous process that starts with the search for large trees. When an old bongo is no longer usable, a consensus is reached by the leaders of each household on which tree is best. At the start of the dry season, they find the tree and kill it. At the end of the dry season, they return to cut it down. It is then hollowed out and flattened with fire and stone tools traded from the mountains (or local shell tools). Traditionally, the work of making the larger canoes by the young men is done with instructions from the elder female of the household, handed down by her daughters to their husbands.

The other type of canoe is small, seating only three people, and is used for daily travel to and from food sources.

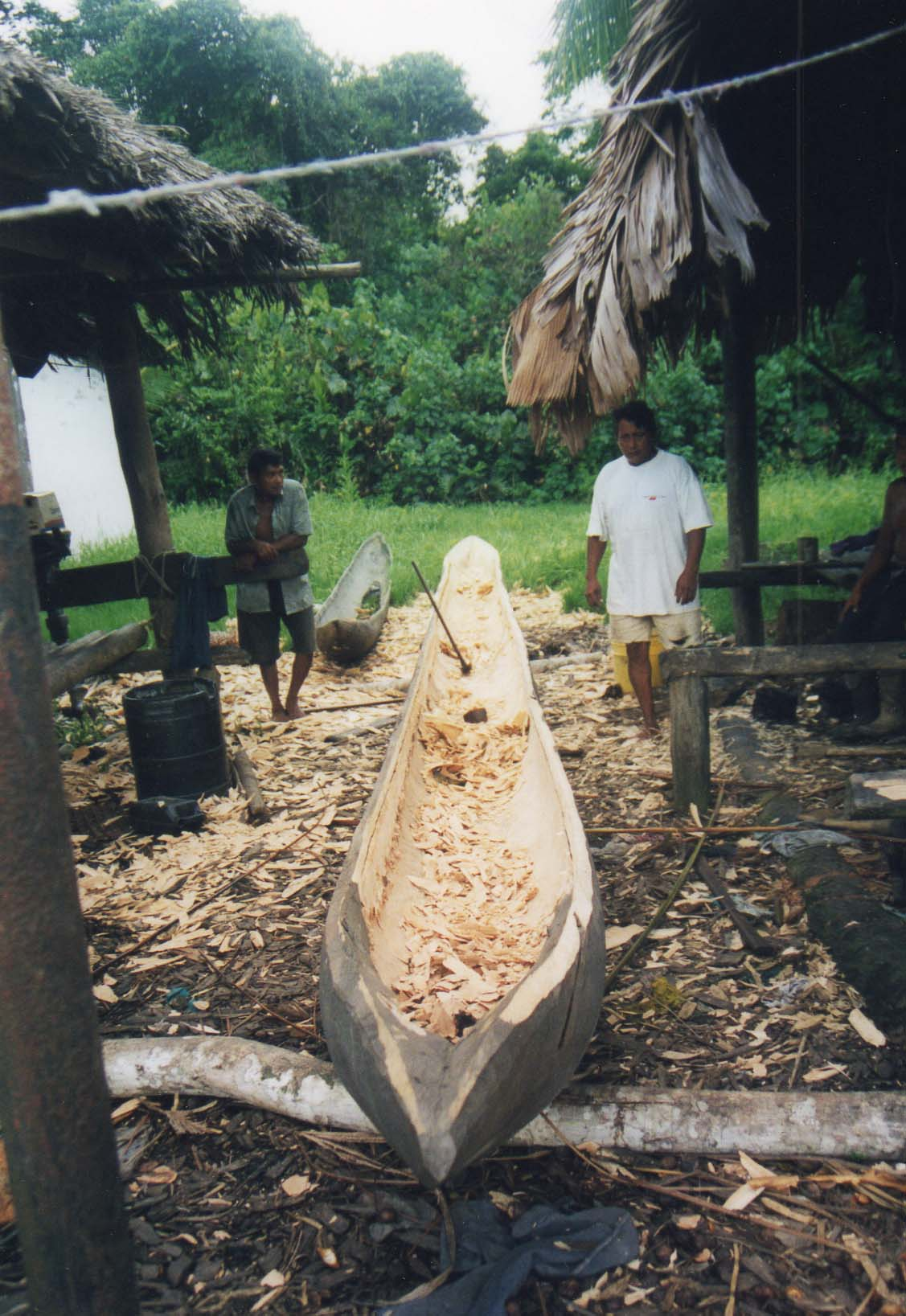
Warao Indians constructing a traditional dugout canoe, Orinoco delta. Simoina area, Delta Amacuro, Venezuela.

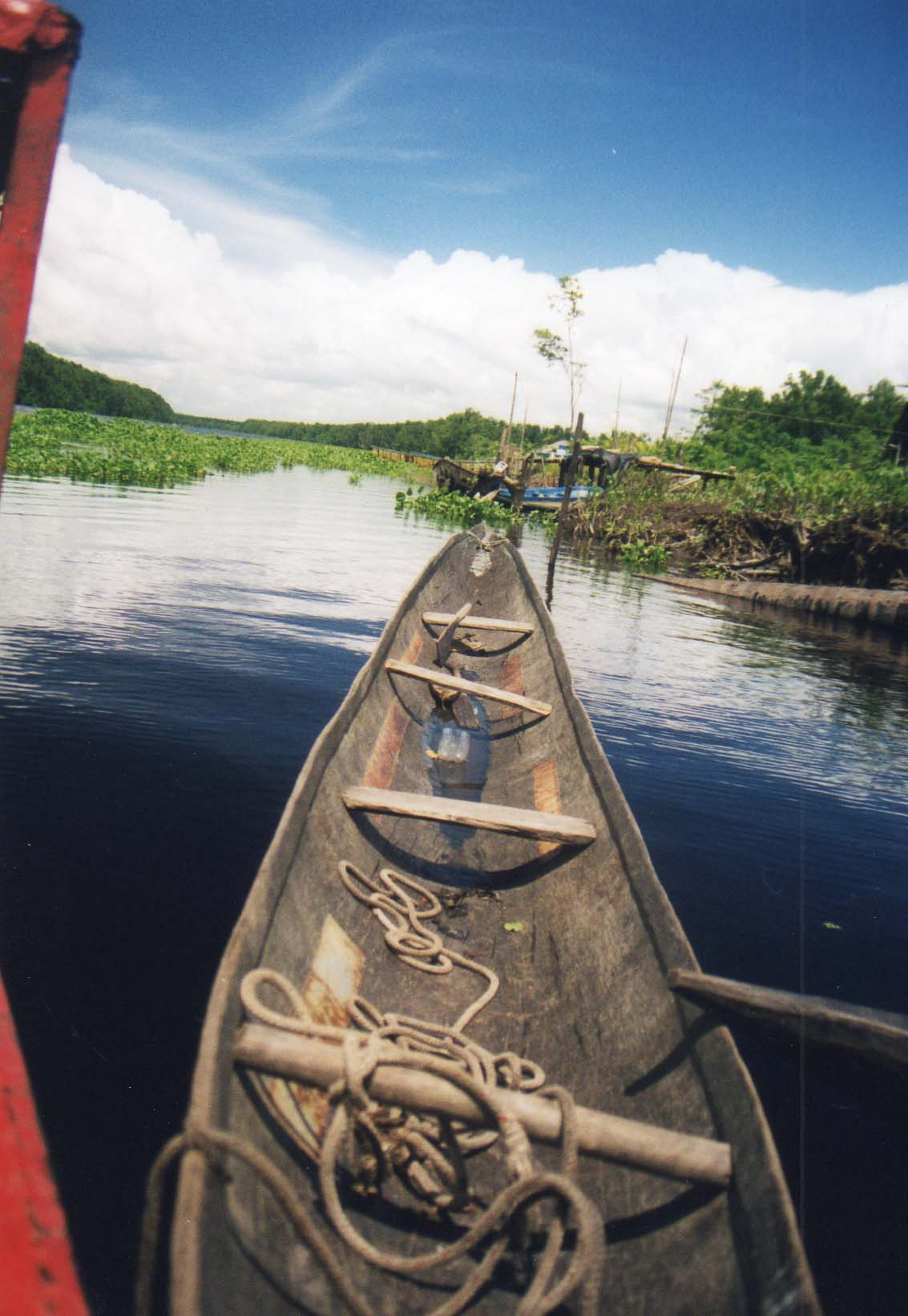
Traditional bongo.

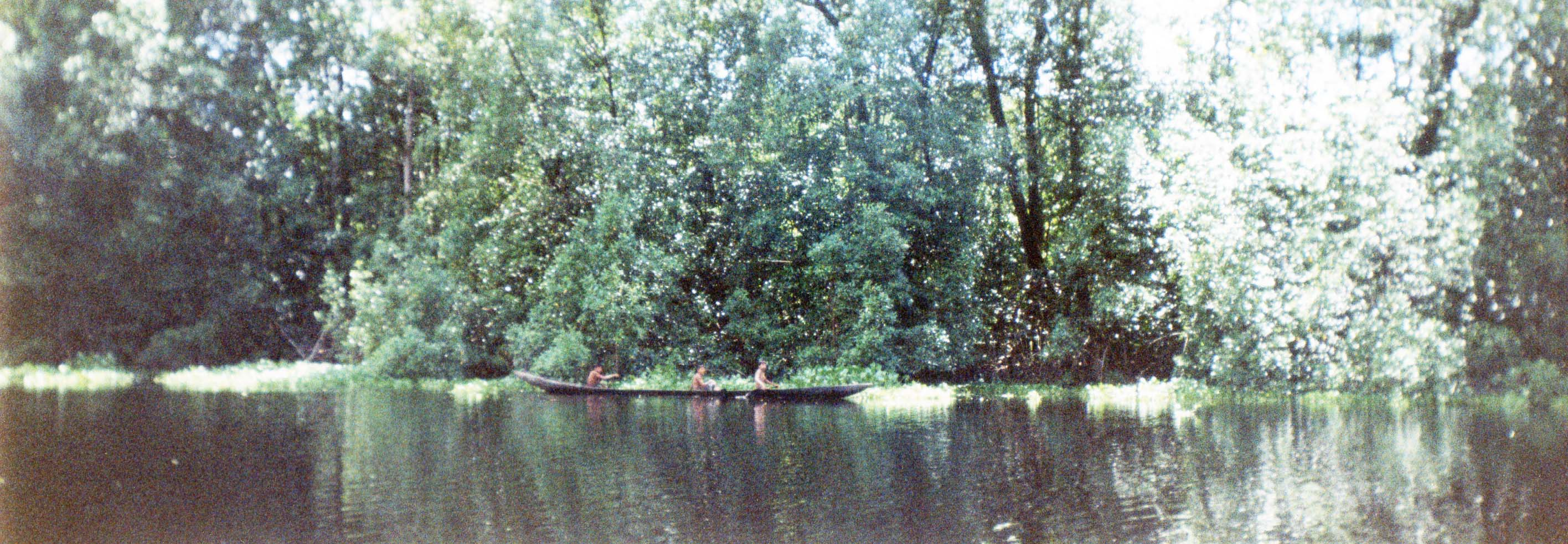
Typical Warao canoe.

=== Diet ===
The Warao diet is varied with an emphasis on the products of the delta, mostly fish. By 1500 they had acquired basic horticulture; many of their daily fruits and vegetables come from the domesticated and cultivated Palm orchards of the delta. In July and August, Warao feast on crabs when they come to the delta from the beach. Hunting is generally avoided due to cultural taboos. They occasionally also eat grubs found in the moriche palm tree. Pith of the palm was also eaten, but contemporary consumption is more likely to have it added as an additional ingredient for cassava bread.

=== Religion ===
The Warao are, according to their own reports, descended from an adventurous heavenly figure — the primordial hunter. This man originally dwelt in a sky world which had men, but was completely devoid of all animals except birds. Hunting these heavenly birds, the founding man used his bow and arrow to strike a bird in mid-air. The bird fell from the sky and eventually hit the heavenly floor. The birds burst through the floor and proceeded through the clouds and towards terrestrial land (Earth) below. The hunter went to the hole in the floor made by the bird and looked through. He saw lush and fertile land (Earth) and resolved to descend to it to partake of its pleasures: beauty, abundant game, fruit, et cetera. The hunter took a long rope of heavenly cotton, tied it to a tree, and threw it through the hole and lowered himself through the clouds to what is now Earth, forsaking his sky world.

The Warao have shamans, who perform music such as rain dances and songs.

== History ==
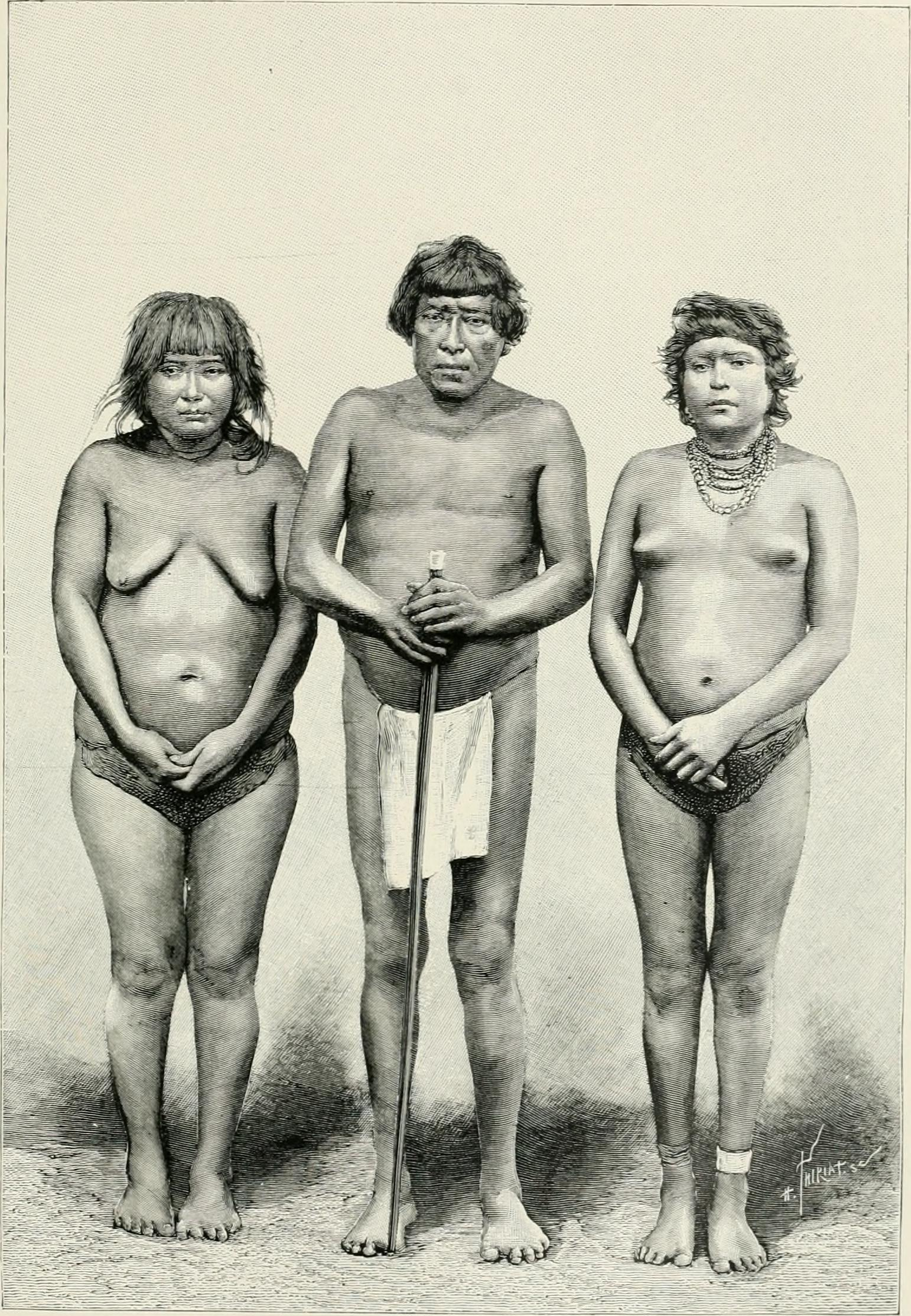
A group of Warao people in 1882.

The Warao have been considered to be the first inhabitants of Guyana, predating the arrival of Arawak and Caribs.

The Warao of eastern Venezuela's Orinoco first had contact with Europeans when, soon after Christopher Columbus reached the Orinoco river delta, Alonso de Ojeda decided to navigate the river upstream. There, in the delta, Ojeda saw the distinctively stilted Warao huts, balanced over the water. Similar architecture in Sinamaica far to the west had been likened to Venice, with its famous canals below and buildings above; this new encounter propagated the name of Venezuela ("little Venice") for the whole land.

== Contemporary issues ==
The inaccessibility of the Warao's lands makes access to health care difficult. Tuberculosis is common. The Orinoco delta has minimal infrastructure, no sanitation, and limited education resulting in a high degree of illiteracy.

HIV was first detected in 2007 in the Warao communities of the lower Orinoco Delta region of Venezuela. In some communities already 35% test positive for the HIV virus. With Venezuela's failing health care system, there is an absence of prevention programs; this, together, with severe language barriers — many Warao are illiterate and do not speak fluent Spanish — have allowed ignorance about the disease to flourish. The culture is felt to be severely threatened.

In the summer of 2008, Indigenous leaders and researchers from the University of California, Berkeley issued a report detailing the deaths of 38 Warao in the Delta Amacuro state from a mysterious illness. The disease, which causes "partial paralysis, convulsions and an extreme fear of water" is believed to be a form of rabies transmitted by bats. Upon reaching Caracas to inform the government of the outbreak and request assistance, the leaders and researchers were "met with disrespect on every level, as if the deaths of Indigenous people are not even worth anything."

The Crisis in Venezuela in the early 21st century has resulted into a migration of Warao into neighbouring countries. The refugees in Boa Vista, Brazil are not recognised by the Brazilian government as a tribe. As of 2021, an estimated 2,500 refugees have settled in Guyana in Warao communities near Mabaruma and Port Kaituma. Whitewater near Maburuma has limited infrastructure, however it does have a recognised local government. About 250 have settled in Anabisi near Port Kaituma which is remote, lacks infrastructure, and has no access to clean water. Anabisi is part of the hunting and fishing grounds of Citrus Grove which was originally home to Warao and Kalina people, however manganese was discovered in the 1950s, and is not an Amerindian village, because of a mixed population.

== Film treatment ==
In April 2017, The Museum of Modern Art in New York presented a film by Cuban-Venezuelan director Mario Crespo with a cast of nonprofessional actors. The film, titled Dauna. Lo que lleva el río (Gone with the River), presents the difficulty of choosing to stay with the Warao traditions and life or to leave to gain an education among the "Creoles". The film includes a detailed look at Warao culture and life along the river.

== Tourism ==
Tourism has come to the Warao which brings relative wealth for some. Several individuals have set up rough and ready tourist accommodation in their own homes. They offer canoe trips (hand and power) to see the wild life of the delta, also a chance to experience their traditional life and culture. These visits can be arranged in the state capital town of Tucupita through one of many travel agents.

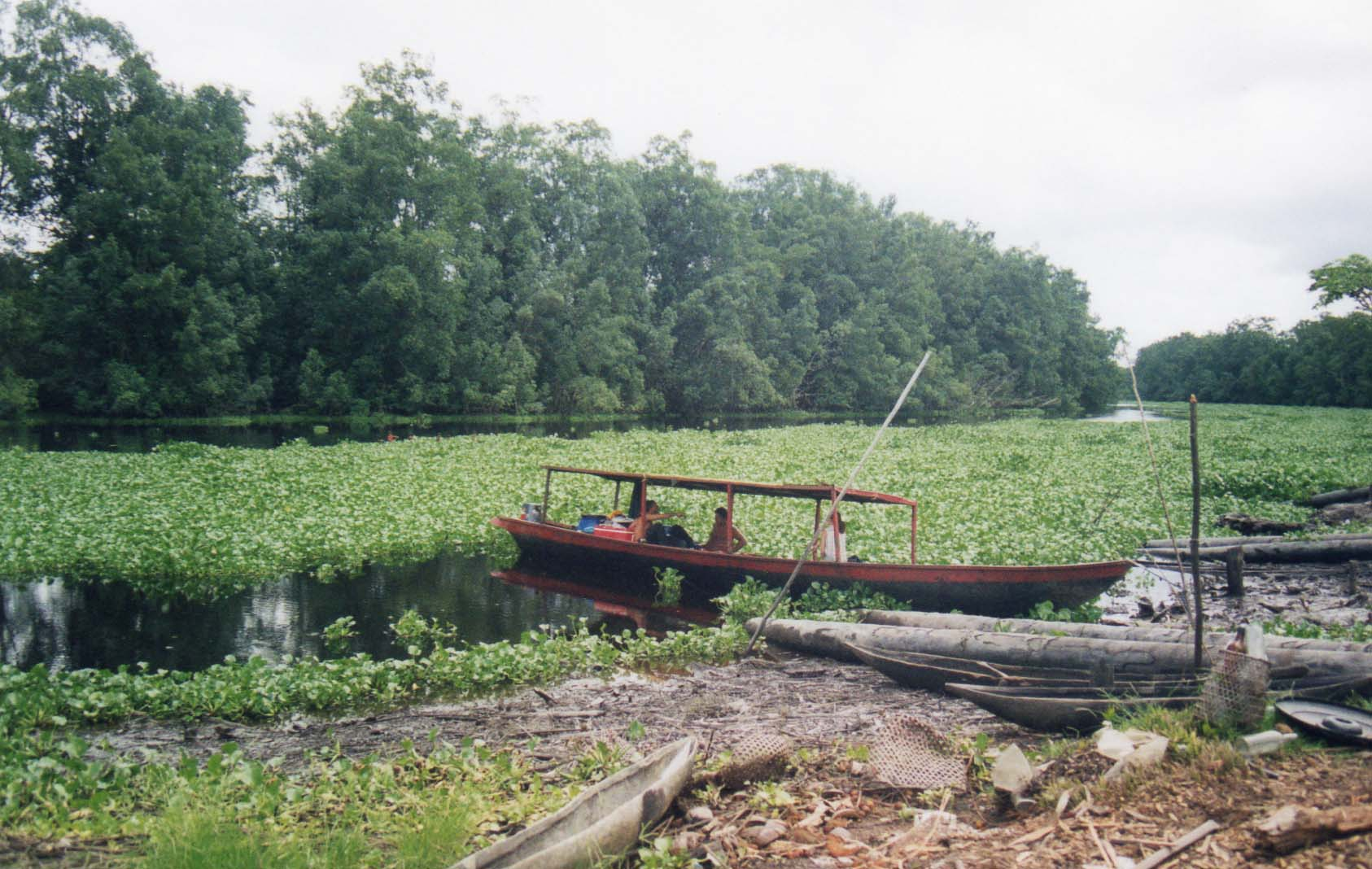
Steel tourist bongo with outboard motor

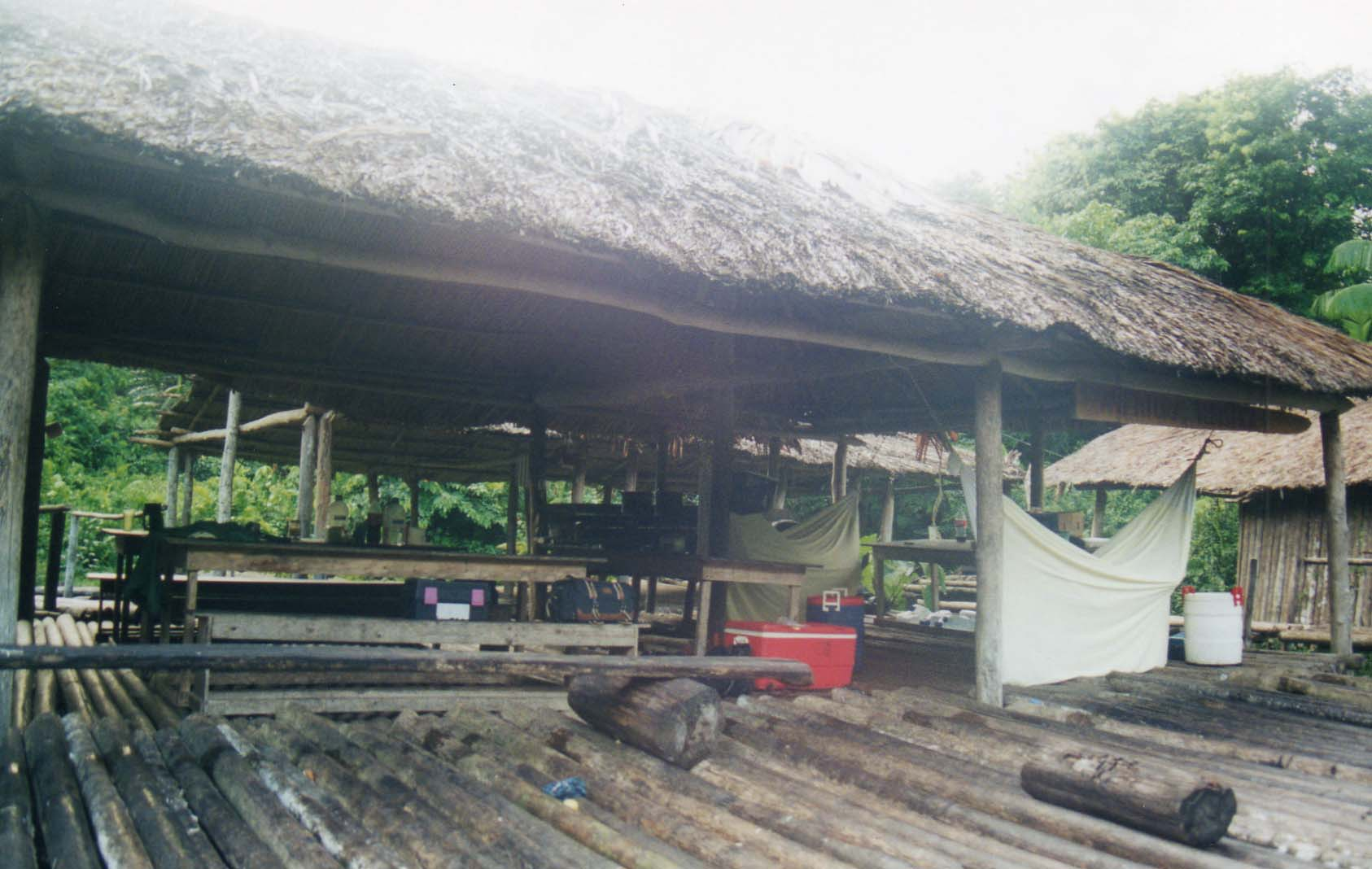
Typical open sided hut on stilts.(Tourist accommodation.)

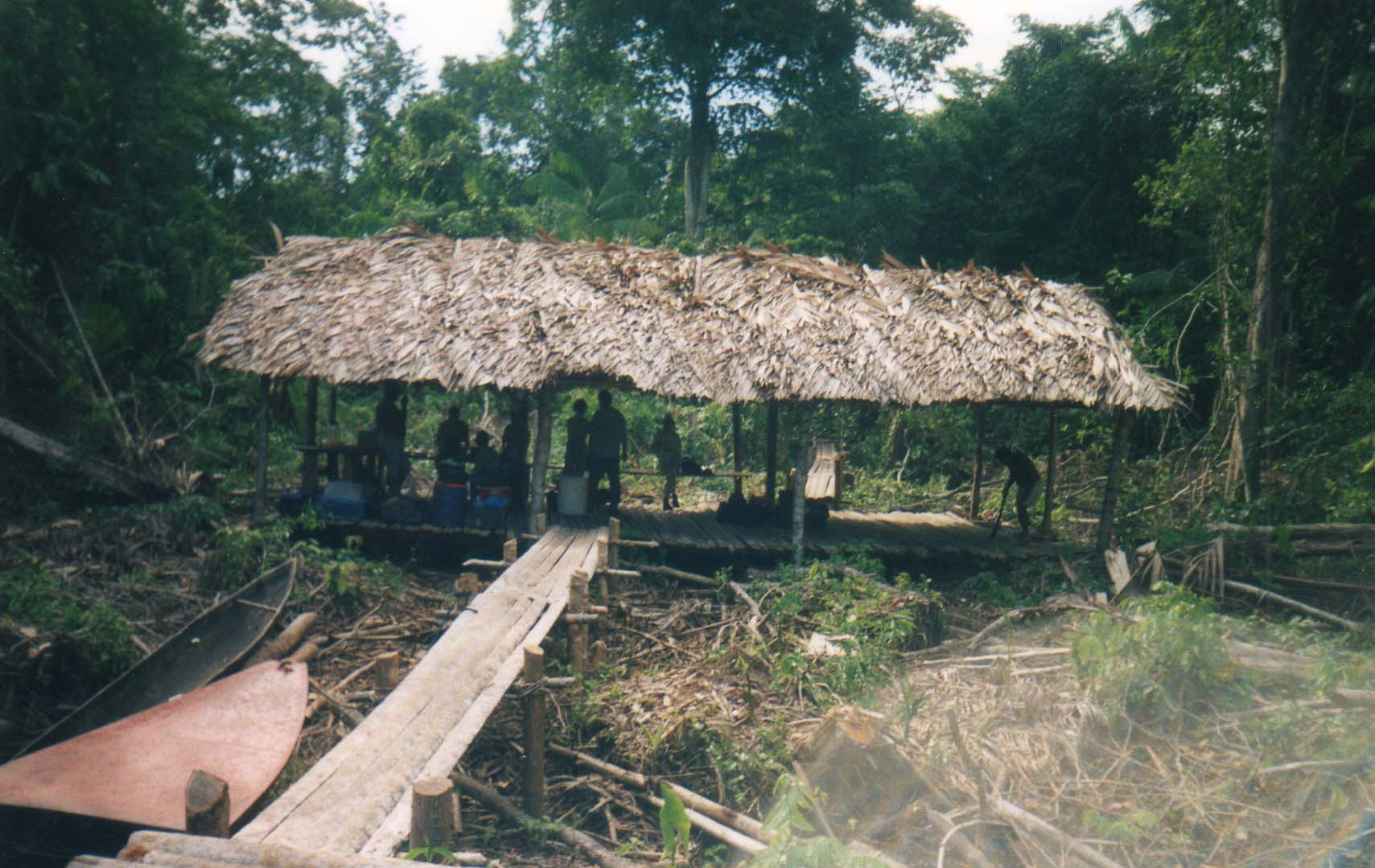
Typical open sided hut on stilts.(Tourist accommodation.)

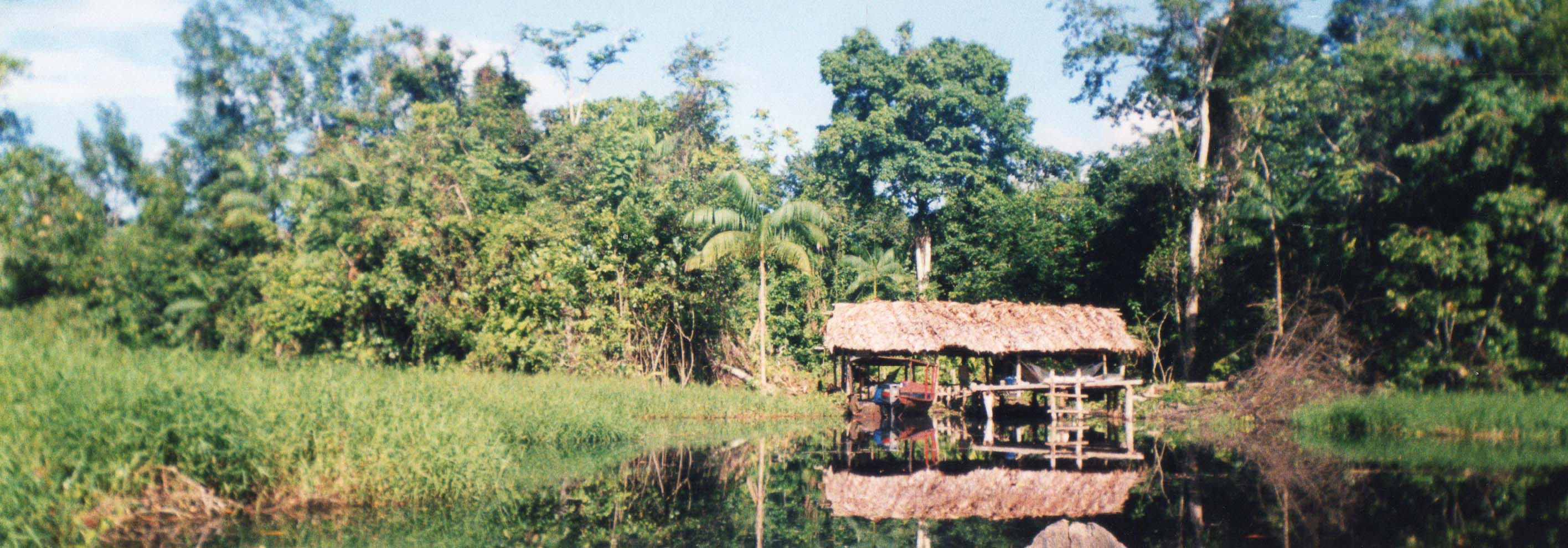
Typical open sided hut on stilts.(Tourist accommodation.)

== Settlements ==
The majority of Warao live in the Orinoco Delta in Venezuela. There are approximately 364 villages in the delta. The main town is Curiapo.

About 5,000 live in the border area of Guyana. The main villages are Assakata, Kamwatta Hill, Koriabo, and Whitewater.

The Warao have a minority presence in the Surinamese villages of Cupido and Post Utrecht.
