= Barima-Waini =

Region of Guyana

Coordinates: 7.667°N 59.750°W

Barima-Waini Region 1
- Administrative region
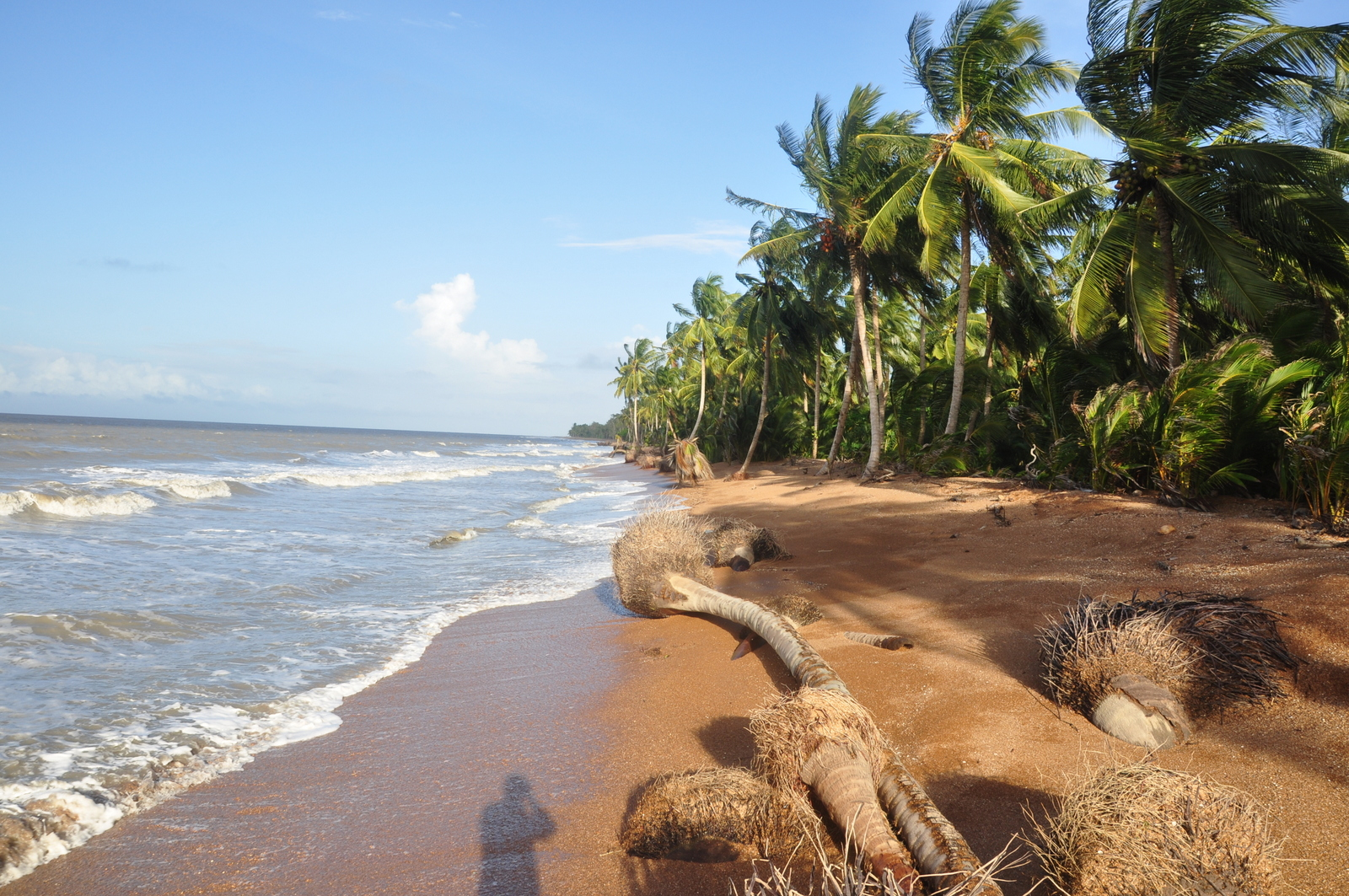

- Flag

- Map of Guyana showing Barima-Waini region
- Country: Guyana
- Regional capital: Mabaruma

Area
  - Total: 20,399 km^{2} (7,876 sq mi)

Population (2022 census)
  - Total: 38,956
  - Density: 1.9097/km^{2} (4.9461/sq mi)

Barima-Waini (Region 1) is a region of Guyana and is located in the northwest of the country. Barima-Waini has three sub-regions: Mabaruma, Matakai, and Moruca.

The region is located in the northwest of the country and has a population of 26,941. It covers an area of 20,339 square kilometres (7,853 sq mi). It borders the Atlantic Ocean to the north, the region of Pomeroon-Supenaam to the east, the region of Cuyuni-Mazaruni to the south and Venezuela to the west.

== History ==
Prior to the 1980 administrative reform in Guyana, the Barima-Waini Region was known as the 'North West district'. The administrative centre is Mabaruma; it was formerly Morawhanna, but danger from floods prompted the change.

== Etymology ==
The region is named after two rivers that flow through the region: the Barima River and the Waini River.

== Geography ==
Barima-Waini is a heavily forested region. The Atlantic coastal strip of Region One features a number of beaches, including, from west to east, Almond Beach, Luri Beach, Shell Beach, Turtle Beach, Foxes Beach, Iron-punt Beach, Pawpaw Beach and Father's Beach. Marine turtles nest on some of these beaches. There are also a number of Amerindian communities in this area, including Santa Rosa Mission.

== Economy ==
The main economic activities in the Barima-Waini region are forestry and gold mining. The northern and northeastern sections have rich soil which grow coffee, ground provisions (such as cassava, eddoes and yams), cabbage, beans, corn, peanuts, and citrus fruits. (This is the area which supplies the famous Pomeroon cassareep.)

The Matthews Ridge-Port Kaituma manganese industry was discontinued in 1968 due to lack of demand. Mining was resumed as of 2011.

== Major settlements, services and facilities ==
The Mabaruma sub-region includes the region's capital of Mabaruma, as well as Barabina, Hosororo, Wauna, Kumaka, White Water and Kamwatta.

Moruca sub-region includes Waramuri, Warapoka, Santa Cruz, Kokerite, Chinese Landing, Kwebena and Santa Rosa, and Haimacabra.

Matakai sub-region includes Sebai, Port Kaituma, Matthew's Ridge, Baramita, Arakaka, and Morawhanna.

The region has two secondary schools, North West Secondary School in Mabaruma, established in 1965, and Santa Rosa Secondary School, established in 1992.

== Population ==
The Government of Guyana has administered five official censuses since the 1980 administrative reforms, in 1980, 1991, 2002, 2012 and 2022. In 2002, the population of Barima-Waini was recorded at 24,275 people. Official census records for the population of Barima-Waini are as follows:

1980	1991	2002	2012	2022
18,329	18,428	24,275	26,941	38,956

== Communities ==
Communities (including name variants):

- Akwero (Acquero, Aqueero)
- Arakaka
- Assakata
- Baramani (Baramanna, Baramanni, Barimanni)
- Baramita
- Chinese Landing
- Five Star (Five Star Landing, Five Stars)
- Hobediah
- Hosororo (Hossororo)
- Kamwatta Hill
- Kokerite (Kokerit Landing, Kokerit)
- Koriabo
- Kumaka
- Kwebanna (Kwabanna)
- Mabaruma (administrative centre)
- Matthew's Ridge
- Mission Landing
- Morawhanna
- Mount Everard
- Pakera
- Port Kaituma
- Saint Bede's Mission (Saint Bedes)
- Santa Cruz
- Santa Rosa (Santa Rosa Mission)
- Surprise Hill
- Waramuri (Waramuri Mission)
- Wauna (Wauna-Yarikita)
- Whitewater

== Territorial claim ==
Venezuela has renewed its claim to the Essequibo region which is situated west of the Essequibo River. The status of the border controversy is subject to the Geneva Agreement, which was signed by the United Kingdom, Venezuela and British Guiana on February 17, 1966. As of December 2020, the matter is being addressed by the ICJ.

== Gallery ==
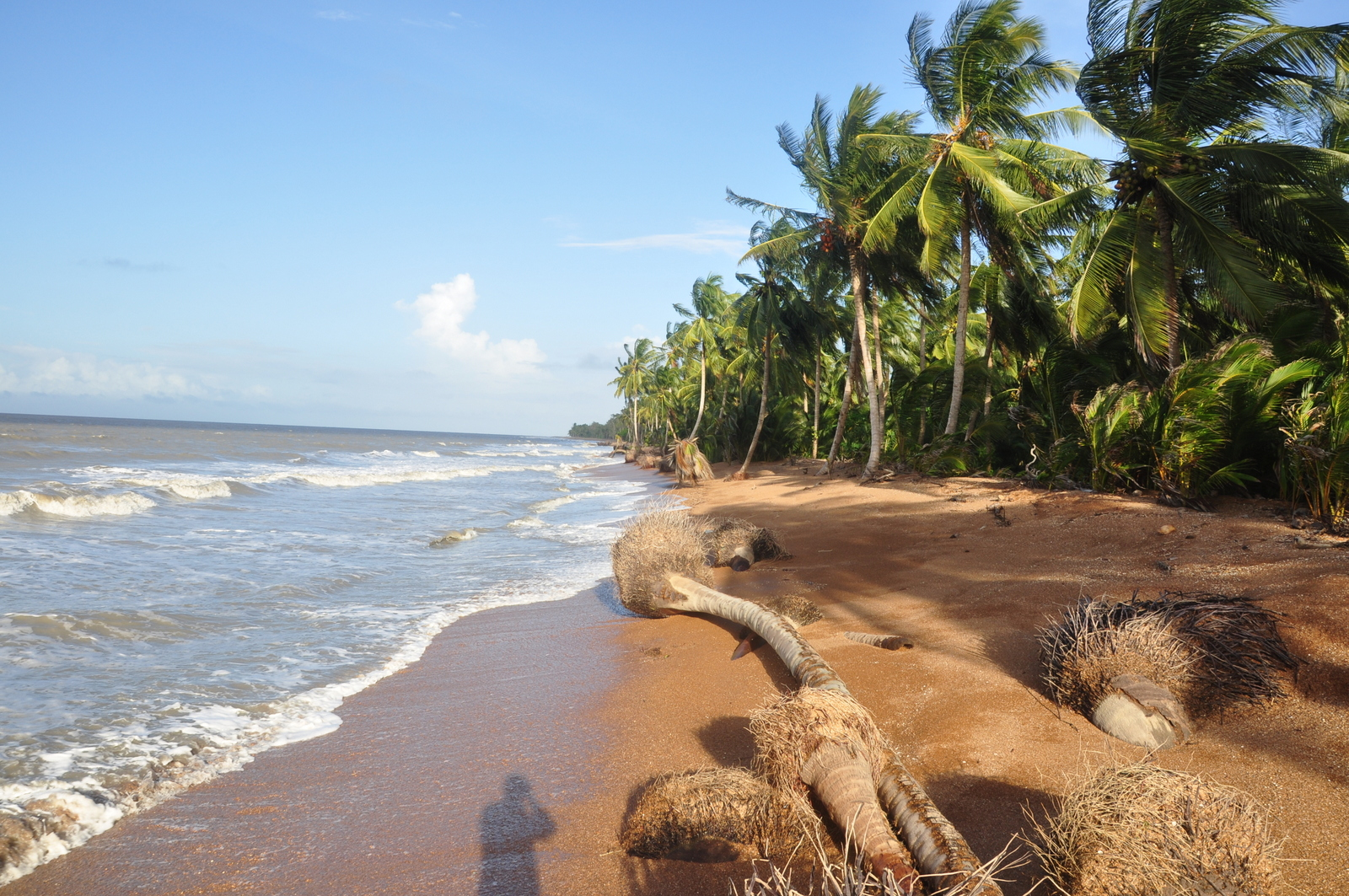
Shell Beach

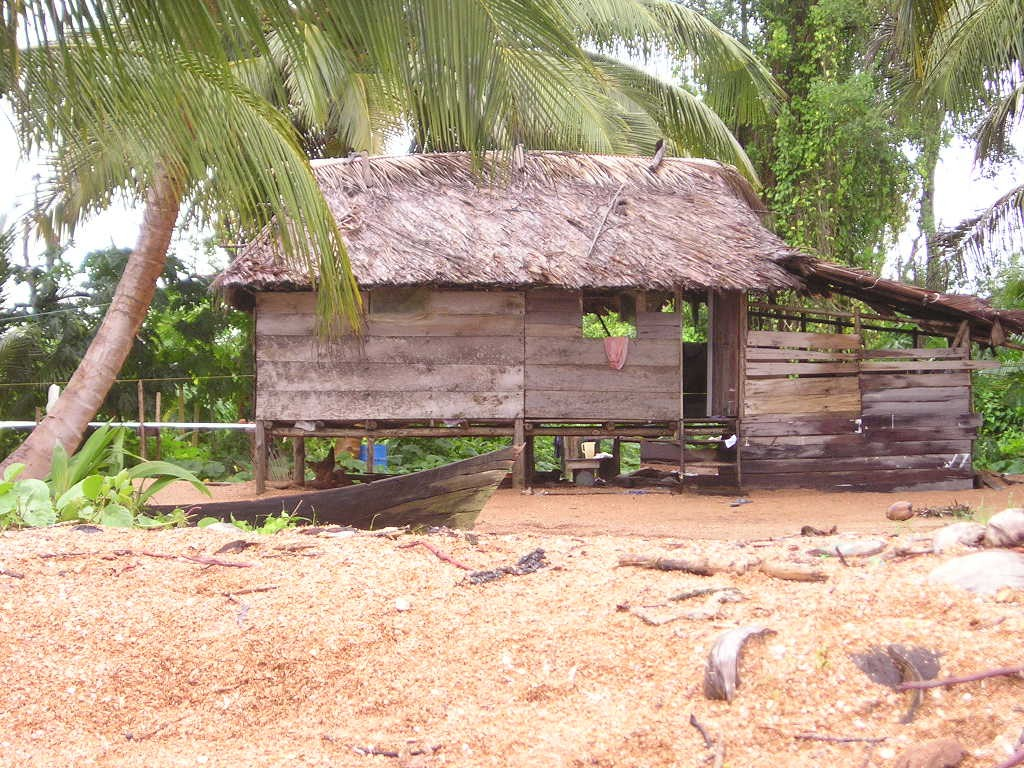
Mabaruma

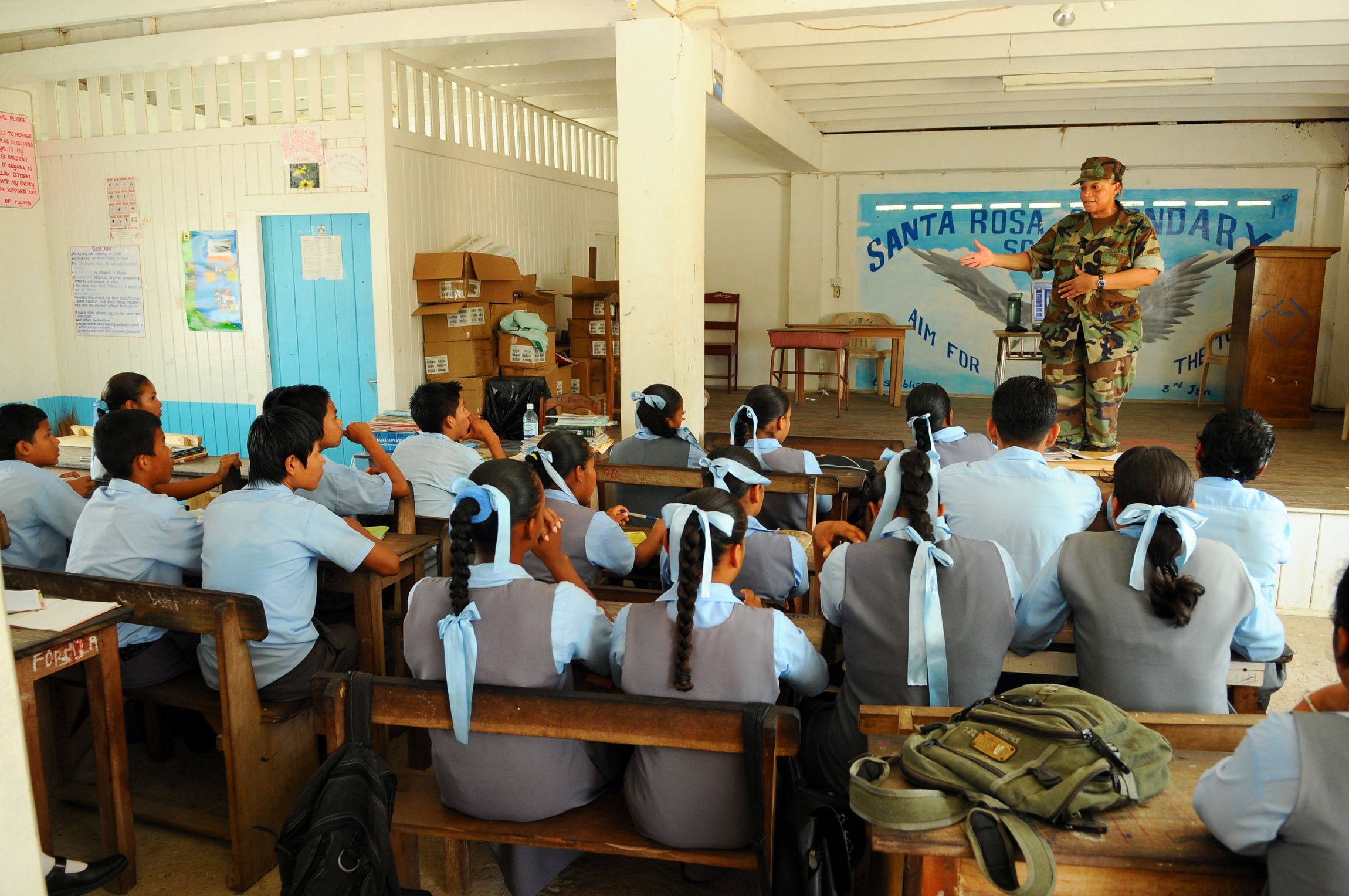
Santa Rosa School

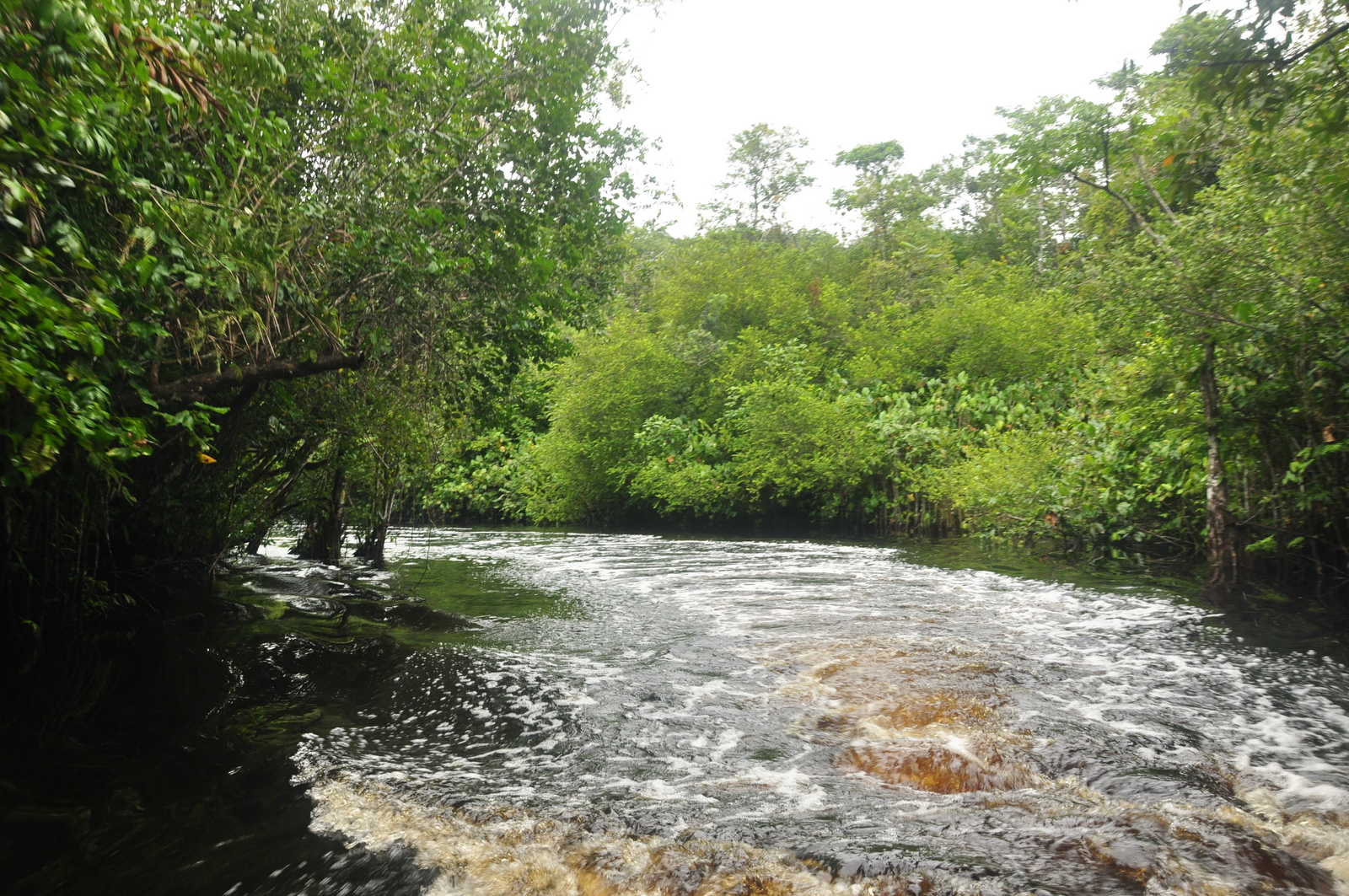
Baramani River

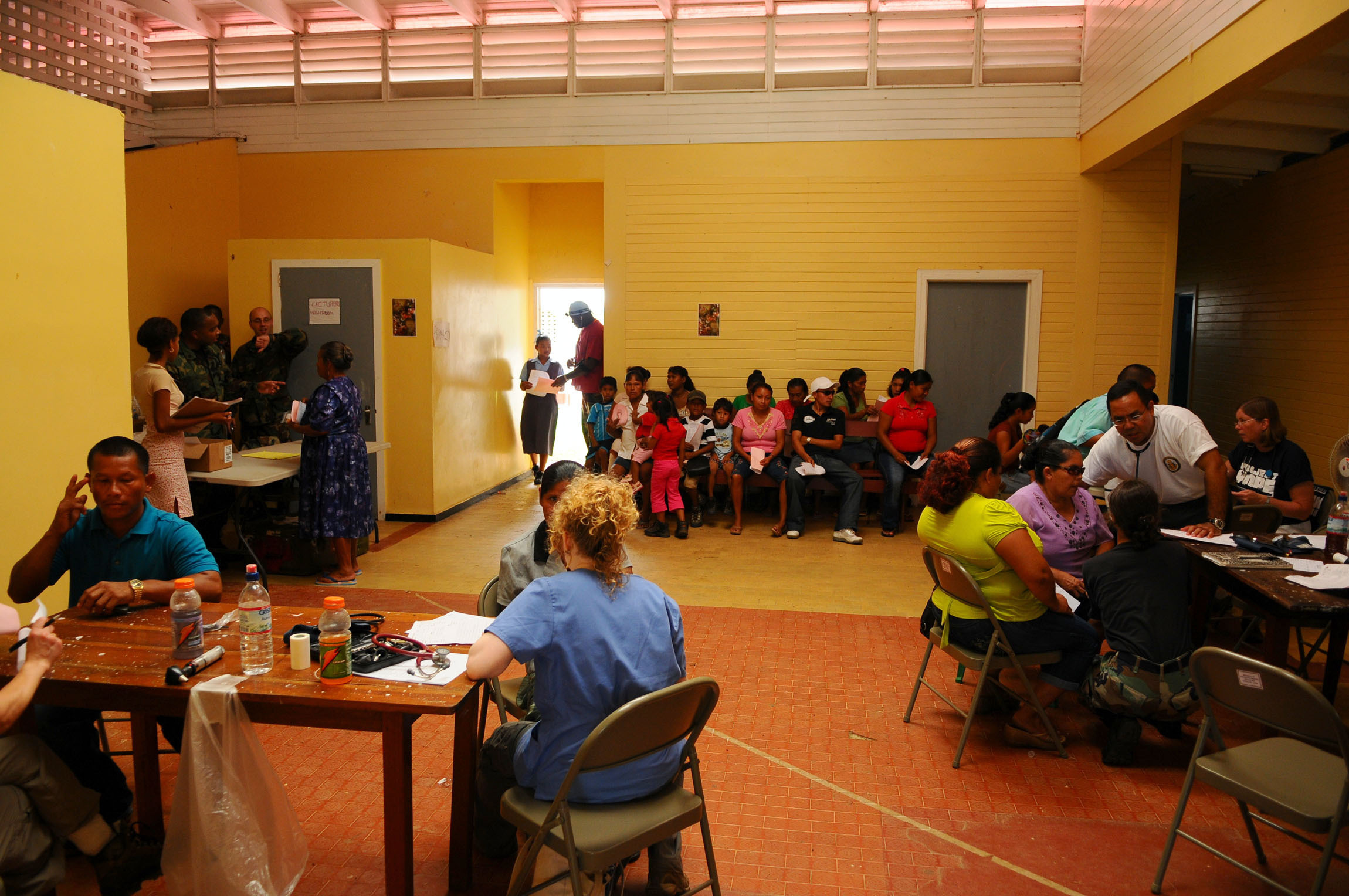
Kumaka District Hospital

== See also ==
- Ankoko Island
- Jonestown
