= Mabaruma =

Regional capital in Barima-Waini, Guyana

- town and regional capital
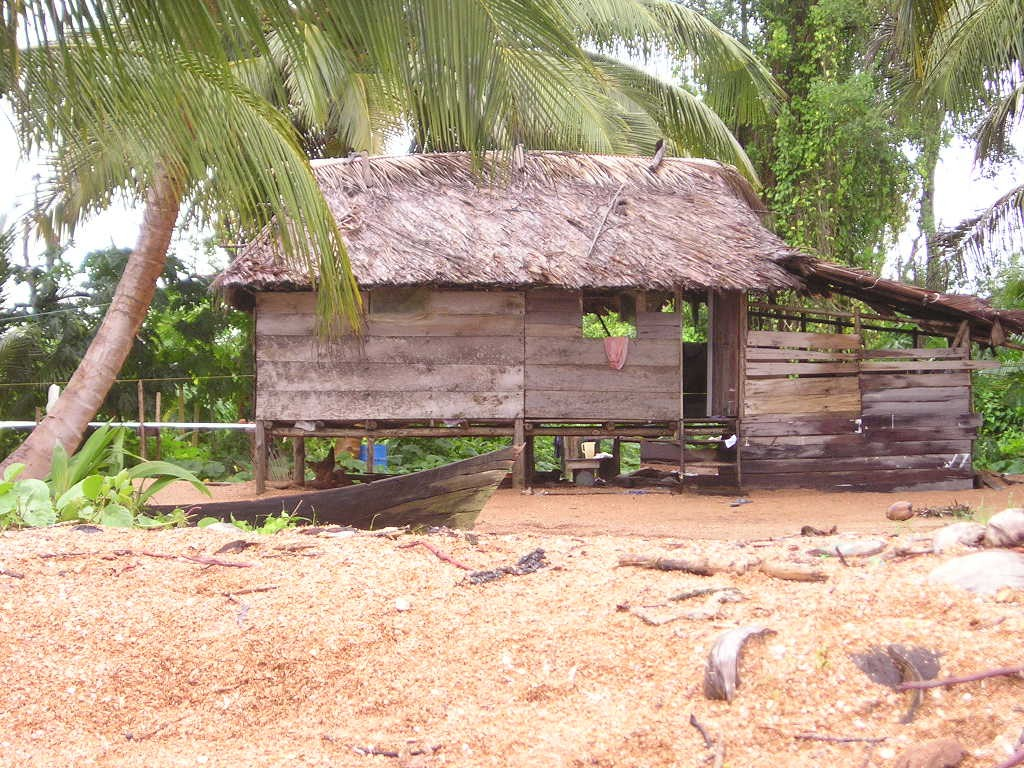

- Location in Guyana
- Coordinates: 8°12′0″N 59°47′0″W
- Country: Guyana
- Region: Barima-Waini
- Elevation: 43 ft (13 m)

Population (2012)
  - Total: 1,254

Mabaruma is the administrative centre and regional capital for Region One (Barima-Waini) of Guyana. It is located close to the Aruka River (the Venezuelan border) on a narrow plateau above the surrounding rainforest at an elevation of 13 metres.

== History ==
Mabaruma was once a large estate owned by the Broomes family. Cocoa was one of the products manufactured before the Government of Guyana bought part of the land to build Governmental Institutions. Mainly Amerindians live in this area. Some of the tribes include Lokono, Kalina and Warao. Mabaruma also has a large Afro-Guyanese population with small East Indian, Chinese and Portuguese communities.

It replaced Morawhanna as the regional capital after the former was deemed at risk from flooding. Mabaruma became a town in 2016 with the surrounding villages of Hosororo and Kumaka joining.

In 2023, amid the Guayana Esequiba diplomatic crisis, a group of Mabaruma citizens rallied in support of Guyana in the dispute. The event was attended by Minister of Housing and Water Collin Croal. The diplomatic crisis has reportedly led some Guyanese citizens to flee the town.

== Overview ==
There is a government guest house in the town as well as the Mabaruma Post Office, Mabaruma Hospital, and a police station where court cases are tried. Because of its size, however, only petty crimes are tried.

Mabaruma contains the region's first secondary school, North West Secondary School, established in 1965. Most local people either do farming or fishing work for a living.

== Climate ==
Mabaruma has a tropical rainforest climate (Af) with heavy to very heavy rainfall year-round.

Climate data for Mabaruma (1991–2020)
Month	Jan	Feb	Mar	Apr	May	Jun	Jul	Aug	Sep	Oct	Nov	Dec	Year
Record high °C (°F)	33.6 (92.5)	33.7 (92.7)	33.5 (92.3)	35.0 (95.0)	35.3 (95.5)	36.0 (96.8)	33.7 (92.7)	35.4 (95.7)	36.0 (96.8)	35.3 (95.5)	34.5 (94.1)	34.5 (94.1)	36.0 (96.8)
Mean daily maximum °C (°F)	31.2 (88.2)	31.0 (87.8)	31.4 (88.5)	31.6 (88.9)	31.2 (88.2)	30.7 (87.3)	31.1 (88.0)	31.4 (88.5)	32.0 (89.6)	32.1 (89.8)	31.5 (88.7)	31.2 (88.2)	31.4 (88.5)
Daily mean °C (°F)	26.5 (79.7)	26.4 (79.5)	26.7 (80.1)	26.9 (80.4)	26.7 (80.1)	26.5 (79.7)	26.7 (80.1)	27.0 (80.6)	27.3 (81.1)	27.2 (81.0)	26.8 (80.2)	26.7 (80.1)	26.8 (80.2)
Mean daily minimum °C (°F)	21.7 (71.1)	21.6 (70.9)	22.0 (71.6)	22.3 (72.1)	22.2 (72.0)	22.2 (72.0)	22.3 (72.1)	22.4 (72.3)	22.5 (72.5)	22.3 (72.1)	22.2 (72.0)	21.9 (71.4)	22.1 (71.8)
Record low °C (°F)	17.5 (63.5)	19.0 (66.2)	19.3 (66.7)	18.4 (65.1)	17.4 (63.3)	19.5 (67.1)	19.0 (66.2)	20.0 (68.0)	19.7 (67.5)	18.4 (65.1)	18.0 (64.4)	17.0 (62.6)	17.0 (62.6)
Average precipitation mm (inches)	181.8 (7.16)	100.4 (3.95)	88.0 (3.46)	111.0 (4.37)	260.1 (10.24)	327.7 (12.90)	298.8 (11.76)	213.2 (8.39)	153.6 (6.05)	213.2 (8.39)	239.6 (9.43)	260.0 (10.24)	2,447.4 (96.35)
Average precipitation days (≥ 1.0 mm)	14	11	10	9	18	22	21	17	14	16	18	18	188.3
Source: NOAA
