= Matthews Ridge, Guyana =

Matthews Ridge
- Location in Guyana
- Coordinates: 7°30′N 60°10′W
- Country: Guyana
- Region: Barima-Waini

Population (2012)
  - Total: 409

Matthews Ridge is a small village within the Barima-Waini administrative region of Guyana. The village name comes from the name of a British public official, Matthew French Young (1905-1996), as well as the ridges in the area. The village is divided into three sections, Heaven's Hill, Hell Hill and the valley.

== Demographics & Employment ==
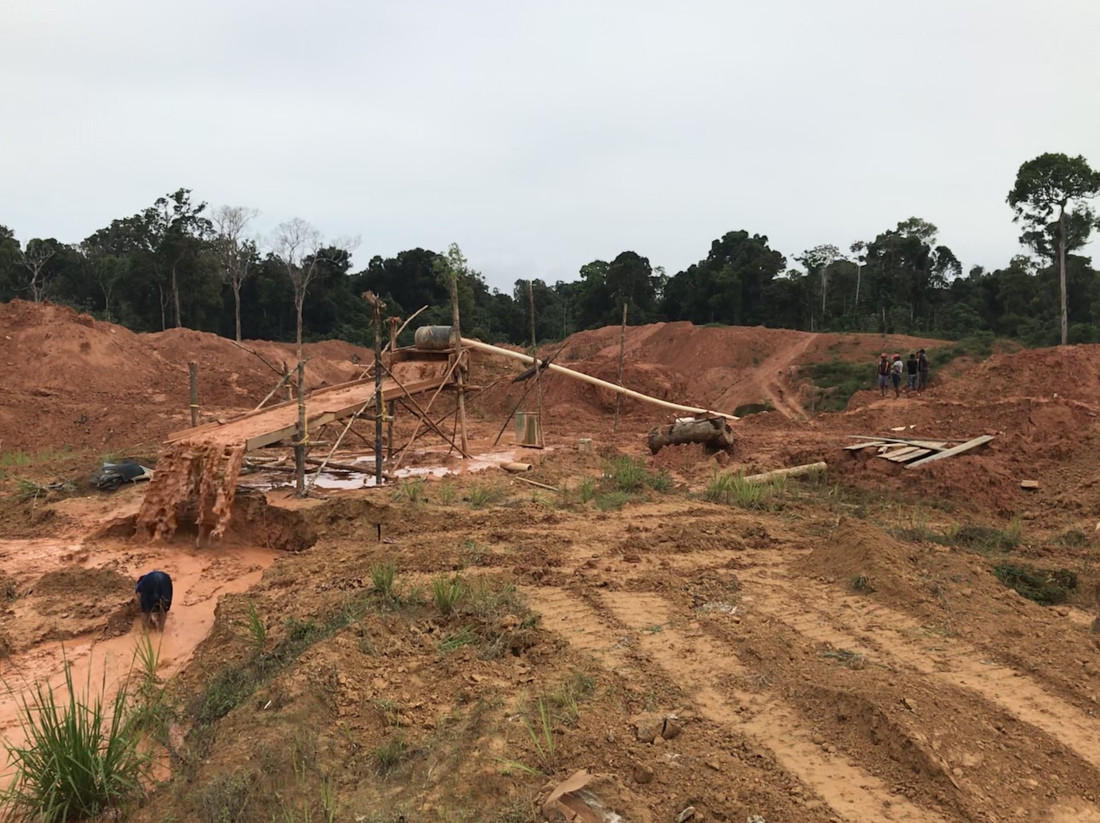
A dredge being used in a nearby backdam.

The population of Matthews Ridge as of 2012 is 409 people, and is composed mainly of Afro-Guyanese and Amerindian persons. Carib is the language spoken by the local Amerindian people.

Agriculture is also an important economic activity in Matthews Ridge, however to a lesser extent than mining.

== History ==
Matthews Ridge was one of the oldest indigenous villages in the Barima-Waini region. Between 1962 and 1968, Matthews Ridge was the location of a large manganese mining operation by Union Carbide. A 38.5-mile (62.0 km) narrow gauge railway was built to Port Kaituma to transport the ore. The mine was closed in 1968. In 2011, it has been reopened by Reunion Manganese Incorporated.

With the closing of the manganese mining operation in 1968, the village went into an economic downturn, which it struggled to recover from for many years. The mine was reopened by Canadian company Reunion Manganese Incorporated, but this operation was taken over by Guyana Manganese Incorporated (GMI) in 2019. Otherwise, small-scale gold mining is the basis for most other jobs in the area. This involves travel to backdams (small areas where gold is known to be located) by foot or on ATVs, where batels or dredges are used to mine.

== Education and health care ==
The local nursery and primary schools can accommodate students through Grade 11. The school (Matthew's Ridge Primary Tops School) had pupils sit CSEC for the first time in 2018, but it not yet recognised as a Secondary School meaning pupils sit exams in the nearby village of Port Kaituma.

Matthew's Ridge has a health care centre, but as of 2017, it was lacking in facilities.

== Infrastructure ==
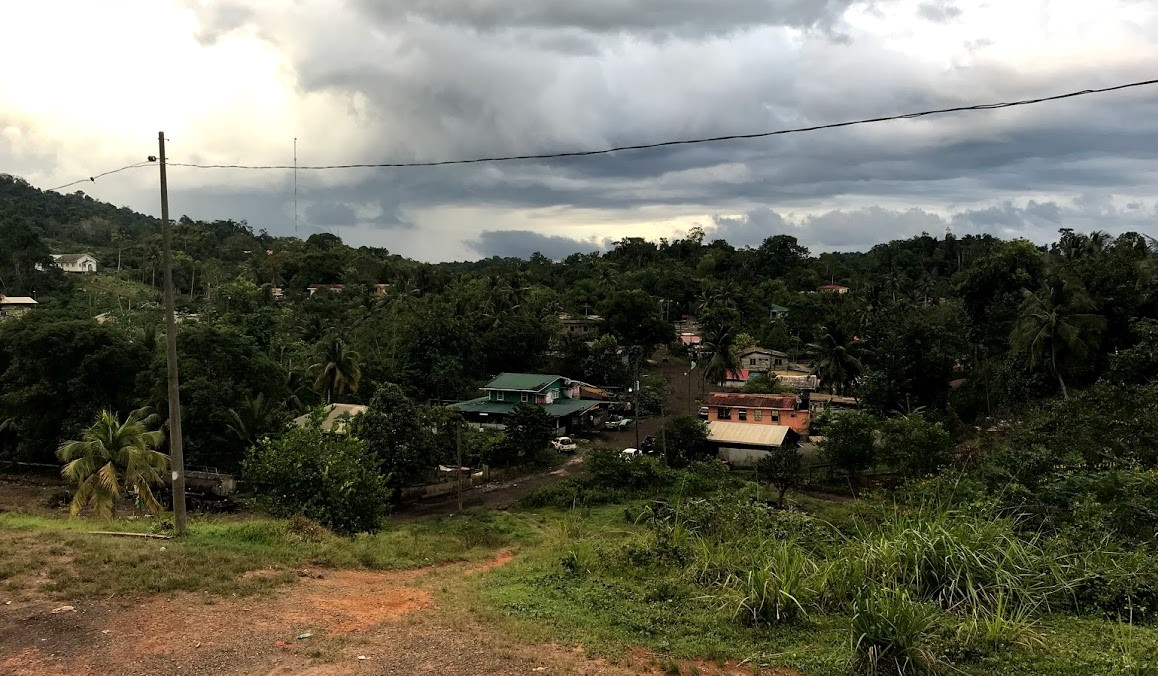
The main street of Matthews Ridge

The infrastructure of the village is elementary. Cell-phone service is available, through the Digicel mobile network. Electric current is available during certain hours of the day, provided by the town's generator. Goods are brought into Matthews Ridge from Georgetown, and Port Kaituma. The village is served Matthews Ridge Airport. The village has a Pentecostal as well as Jehovah Witness church.

== Climate ==
The area experiences an annual shift between rainy and dry seasons. Average temperature ranges between 80 and 100'F.
