= 2023 Venezuelan referendum =

Referendum regarding Venezuelan-claimed territory of Guayana Esequiba

- 3 December 2023
- Voting system: Majority vote
- Outcome: Turnout: 51.01% (officially)

1. Do you agree to reject by all means in accordance with the law, the line fraudulently interposed by the 1899 Paris Arbitration Award, which seeks to deprive us of our Guayana Esequiba?
For	98.00%
Against	2.00%

2. Do you support the 1966 Geneva Agreement as the only valid legal instrument to reach a practical and satisfactory solution for Venezuela and Guyana regarding the controversy over the territory of Guayana Esequiba?
For	98.27%
Against	1.73%

3. Do you agree with Venezuela's historical position of not recognizing the jurisdiction of the International Court of Justice to resolve the territorial controversy over Guayana Esequiba?
For	96.35%
Against	3.65%

4. Do you agree to oppose, by all legal means, Guyana's claim to unilaterally dispose of a sea pending delimitation, illegally and in violation of international law?
For	96.37%
Against	3.63%

5. Do you agree with the creation of the Guayana Esequiba state and the development of an accelerated plan for comprehensive care for the current and future population of that territory, which includes, among others, the granting of citizenship and identity card? Venezuela, in accordance with the Geneva Agreement and International Law, consequently incorporating said state on the map of Venezuelan territory?
For	96.37%
Against	3.63%

A consultative referendum was initiated by the government of Nicolás Maduro regarding Venezuela's claim over the Essequibo region, referred to by Venezuela as Guayana Esequiba, a territory disputed with, and controlled by, neighboring Guyana. The referendum took place on 3 December 2023 in Venezuela. The population of the territory in question was not consulted and did not vote as voting only took place within Venezuela.

The referendum consisted of five questions concerning various aspects of Venezuela's claim to territory controlled and administered by Guyana, including rejection of the International Court of Justice's jurisdiction over the dispute, the establishment of a Guayana Esequiba state, and granting its population immediate Venezuelan citizenship. The referendum was one of the contributing factors for the Guyana–Venezuela crisis.

According to the Venezuelan government, more than 95% of Venezuelans who voted selected "yes" on each of the five questions on the ballot. International analysts and media reported that turnout had been remarkably low and that the Venezuelan government had falsified the results.

Following the poor turnout, the chief prosecutor of Venezuela, Tarek William Saab, accused opposition leaders of sabotaging the referendum and issued arrest warrants for 15 of them, with charges such as treason and conspiracy. This appeared to be a further attempt to suppress political opposition ahead of the 2024 presidential election, despite free and fair elections being agreed with the US as a condition for lifting sanctions.

== Background ==
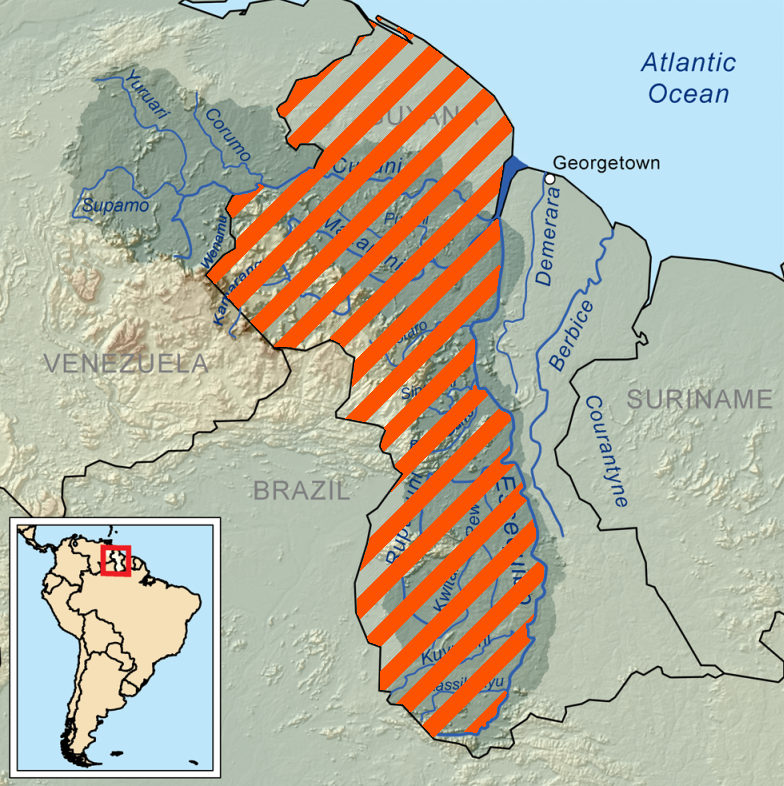
Essequibo region claimed by Venezuela.

The territory controlled and administered by Guyana and claimed by Venezuela is a 159,500 km^{2} (61,600 sq mi) region west of the Essequibo River. Portions of the area were formerly under the control of the Dutch empire as part of the Essequibo colony. In 1814, the British acquired the area as a result of a treaty with the Netherlands. Following the establishment of Gran Colombia in 1819, territorial disputes began between Gran Colombia, later Venezuela, who annexed Essequibo, and the British, who appointed Robert Hermann Schomburgk to define the western boundary in 1835. His "Schomburgk line" established the boundary and coincided with the position of Essequibo according to the older maps of the Dutch. In 1841 the government of José Antonio Páez denounced, instead, the incursion of Venezuelan territory by the British Empire.

Subsequently, gold was discovered in the Yuruarí River basin in 1876. In 1895, Venezuela sought the support of the United States and advocated for the country to intervene in the dispute through the Monroe Doctrine. The United States House of Representatives proposed Resolution 252 to Congress, which recommended the dispute be resolved by international arbitration following pressure from American president Grover Cleveland. During the Venezuelan crisis of 1895, the Schomburgk Line was proposed as a border between Venezuela and British Guiana but neither of the parties agreed on the exact boundary. With the Treaty of Washington in 1897, however, the United Kingdom of Great Britain and Venezuela both agreed to arbitration with the expectation that the arbitral ruling in Paris would ultimately be a "full, perfect, and final settlement" to the border dispute. It was the belief that the resulting decision was a compromise between the great powers of the time.

The region's status is subject to the Geneva Agreement of 1966, signed by the governments of the United Kingdom, Venezuela, and British Guiana. The agreement stipulated that the parties involved will agree to find a peaceful, practical, and satisfactory resolution to the dispute. Venezuela argues that the 1966 agreement nullified the results of the original arbitration that established the Schomburgk line as the border between Venezuela and Guyana. Venezuela's claim to the territory it calls "Guayana Esequiba" is one of the only issues that receives unified support from both chavistas and the Venezuelan opposition.

Venezuela insists on following the terms of the 1966 agreement and achieving a solution through dialogue. Venezuela believes that the principle of uti possidetis would apply in the situation. Guyana's leadership rejects direct dialogue with Venezuela on the matter and President of Guyana Irfaan Ali insists on a resolution done through the International Court of Justice (ICJ). Venezuela, in turn, does not recognize the legitimacy of the ICJ in resolving the dispute. In 2023, the President of Venezuela sent a letter to the Secretary-General of the United Nations to ask him to mediate the dispute.

Claims over the territory intensified as a result of the discovery of significant discovery of oil and gas deposits on offshore sites of the territory. Critics of the referendum believe that it is a way to test support for the ruling government ahead of next year's elections, as well as creating pressure for international courts to grant Venezuela full rights over the territory.

== Questions ==
The following questions were approved by the National Electoral Council on 23 October 2023 and approved by the Constitutional Chamber of the Supreme Justice Court on 1 November 2023:

1. "Do you agree to reject by all means in accordance with the law, the line fraudulently interposed by the 1899 Paris Arbitration Award, which seeks to deprive us of our Guayana Esequiba?"
2. "Do you support the 1966 Geneva Agreement as the only valid legal instrument to reach a practical and satisfactory solution for Venezuela and Guyana regarding the controversy over the territory of Guayana Esequiba?"
3. "Do you agree with Venezuela's historical position of not recognizing the jurisdiction of the International Court of Justice to resolve the territorial controversy over Guayana Esequiba?"
4. "Do you agree to oppose, by all legal means, Guyana's claim to unilaterally dispose of a sea pending delimitation, illegally and in violation of international law?"
5. "Do you agree with the creation of the Guayana Esequiba state and the development of an accelerated plan for comprehensive care for the current and future population of that territory, which includes, among others, the granting of citizenship and identity card? Venezuela, in accordance with the Geneva Agreement and International Law, consequently incorporating said state on the map of Venezuelan territory?"

== Conduct ==
On 19 November, a referendum rehearsal was held in Venezuela. On 29 November, an electoral rehearsal was also organized for high school students between the ages of 12 and 18. It was announced that more than 350,000 military personnel would guard the electoral process nationwide.

During the referendum on 3 December, low turnout and presence at polling stations were reported.

The National Electoral Council of Venezuela (CNE) declared that voters chose "yes" more than 95% of the time on each of five questions on the ballot, saying that there was a total of 10,554,320 votes, without specifying if it was the number of voters or of answered questions.

International analysts and media reported that turnout had been remarkably low and that the Venezuelan government had falsified the results. The CNE published and later deleted a table showing around 2 million votes for each of the five questions, suggesting that the votes were counted instead of the voters. Opposition politician Henrique Capriles, who also voted in the referendum, declared that the turnout was around 10.2%, saying that each voter had five choices, which would mean that 2,110,864 people participated. Nevertheless, there existed five votes per ballot for each individual.

== Results ==
=== Question 1 ===
Do you agree to reject by all means in accordance with the law, the line fraudulently interposed by the 1899 Paris Arbitration Award, which seeks to deprive us of our Guayana Esequiba?
Choice	Votes	%
For	10,315,485	98.00
Against	210,329	2.00
Total	10,525,814	100.00
Valid votes	10,525,814	99.72
Invalid/blank votes	29,278	0.28
Total votes	10,555,092	100.00
Registered voters/turnout	20,694,124	51.01
Source: CNE (99.89% declared)

=== Question 2 ===
Do you support the 1966 Geneva Agreement as the only valid legal instrument to reach a practical and satisfactory solution for Venezuela and Guyana regarding the controversy over the territory of Guayana Esequiba?
Choice	Votes	%
For	10,322,718	98.27
Against	181,725	1.73
Total	10,504,443	100.00
Valid votes	10,504,443	99.52
Invalid/blank votes	50,649	0.48
Total votes	10,555,092	100.00
Registered voters/turnout	20,694,124	51.01
Source: CNE (99.89% declared)

=== Question 3 ===
Do you agree with Venezuela's historical position of not recognizing the jurisdiction of the International Court of Justice to resolve the territorial controversy over Guayana Esequiba?
Choice	Votes	%
For	10,132,099	96.35
Against	384,321	3.65
Total	10,516,420	100.00
Valid votes	10,516,420	99.63
Invalid/blank votes	38,672	0.37
Total votes	10,555,092	100.00
Registered voters/turnout	20,694,124	51.01
Source: CNE (99.89% declared)

=== Question 4 ===
Do you agree to oppose, by all legal means, Guyana's claim to unilaterally dispose of a sea pending delimitation, illegally and in violation of international law?
Choice	Votes	%
For	10,134,189	96.37
Against	381,770	3.63
Total	10,515,959	100.00
Valid votes	10,515,959	99.63
Invalid/blank votes	39,133	0.37
Total votes	10,555,092	100.00
Registered voters/turnout	20,694,124	51.01
Source: CNE (99.89% declared)

=== Question 5 ===
Do you agree with the creation of the Guayana Esequiba state and the development of an accelerated plan for comprehensive care for the current and future population of that territory, which includes, among others, the granting of citizenship and identity card? Venezuela, in accordance with the Geneva Agreement and International Law, consequently incorporating said state on the map of Venezuelan territory?
Choice	Votes	%
For	10,070,255	96.37
Against	379,397	3.63
Total	10,449,652	100.00
Valid votes	10,449,652	99.00
Invalid/blank votes	105,440	1.00
Total votes	10,555,092	100.00
Registered voters/turnout	20,694,124	51.01
Source: CNE (99.89% declared)

== Reactions ==
=== International ===
The proposed questions were condemned by the Guyanese government, which appealed to the International Court of Justice for intervention against Venezuela. The Venezuelan ambassador to Guyana, Carlos Amador Pérez Silva, was summoned by Guyana to express the nation's "deep concern" over the proposed referendum.

The Commonwealth of Nations Secretary-General Patricia Scotland condemned the referendum proposal on grounds of territorial sovereignty. The leadership of the Caribbean Community voiced support for Guyana, stating that the referendum would have no bearing on international law and stating that international law prohibits an individual nation's unilateral seizure of another's territory.

In response to the escalating tensions in the region, Brazil increased its military presence along its northern border in November 2023.

The Secretary General of the Organization of American States (OAS), Luis Almagro, issued a statement condemning the consultation, considering that "it is illegal according to the 1966 Geneva Agreement". In the communiqué, Almagro reiterated that both countries had the responsibility to resolve the dispute peacefully.

=== Domestic ===
Within Venezuela, the Episcopal Conference of Venezuela asked that the referendum not be "manipulated by purely political interests or as a means of pressure on citizens", advocating that the conflict between Guyana and Venezuela to be resolved within the framework of "dialogue and law", peacefully and not escalate into a larger dispute.

The Unitary Platform opposition coalition called on the population to decide "freely" and making use of their "free will" whether to participate in the referendum and how to answer to its questions. Opposition politicians Juan Guaidó and Leopoldo López rejected the referendum, as did opposition parties such as Popular Will and Justice First. Opposition presidential candidate María Corina Machado assured that sovereignty was not consulted, but exercised, and asked to suspend the referendum in order to form a national team to file a claim at the International Court of Justice (ICJ). Guaidó stated that "Sovereignty, like rights, are exercised and defended. You do not consult them, you do not beg for them", while López said that "The referendum was a failure for the dictatorship". Juan Pablo Guanipa, politician of the Justice First party, also rejected the referendum, declaring "it is a referendum that they organize for everything, except to defend". Through a public statement, Justice First condemned the intention to "politically instrumentalize a matter that corresponds to national sovereignty", and a statement published by Popular Will read: "The territorial integrity of a country must be defined by means of the exercise of the State's authority and backed by the legitimacy granted by international laws and historical tradition", besides denouncing that public employees were being forced to vote in the referendum.

On the other hand, Democratic Action politician, Carlos Prosperi, declared that he would participate in the referendum, inviting to participate in it. Henrique Capriles, former presidential candidate (2012 and 2013) and from Justice First, also announced that he would participate in the process, although he rejected its politicization. Manuel Rosales, also a former presidential candidate (2006), also called to vote in the referendum. The Venezuelan government accused the opposition of calling to boycotting the referendum and of violating agreements signed in Barbados, which included the ratification of Venezuela's "historical, sovereign and inalienable rights" over the Essequibo territory.

The Communist Party of Venezuela (PCV), one of the parties banned by the Maduro government, described the referendum as the "old strategy of the bourgeoisie [that tries] to instill patriotic and chauvinist feelings in a good part of the population (...) making people believe that in our country there is no more important problem to solve", which would serve the State to suspend the 2024 presidential elections.

Former Chavista officials Andrés Izarra and Rafael Ramírez considered the referendum a failure. Ramírez described the process as "a thunderous failure", while Izarra pointed out that pre-referendum polls estimated a turnout of approximately 20%, a figure that Izarra said was an overestimate. After the referendum, Venezuelan political scientist Nicmer Evans declared that the figures caused "irreparable damage" to the credibility of the Electoral Power, the National Electoral Council.

== See also ==
- 1984 Argentine Beagle conflict dispute resolution referendum
- 2018 Guatemalan territorial dispute referendum
- Guyana–Venezuela crisis (2023–2024)
- Foreign policy of Nicolás Maduro
- Guyana–Venezuela relations
- South American territorial disputes
- Uti possidetis juris
