= Venezuelan crisis of 1895 =

Political crisis in Venezuela in the 19th century

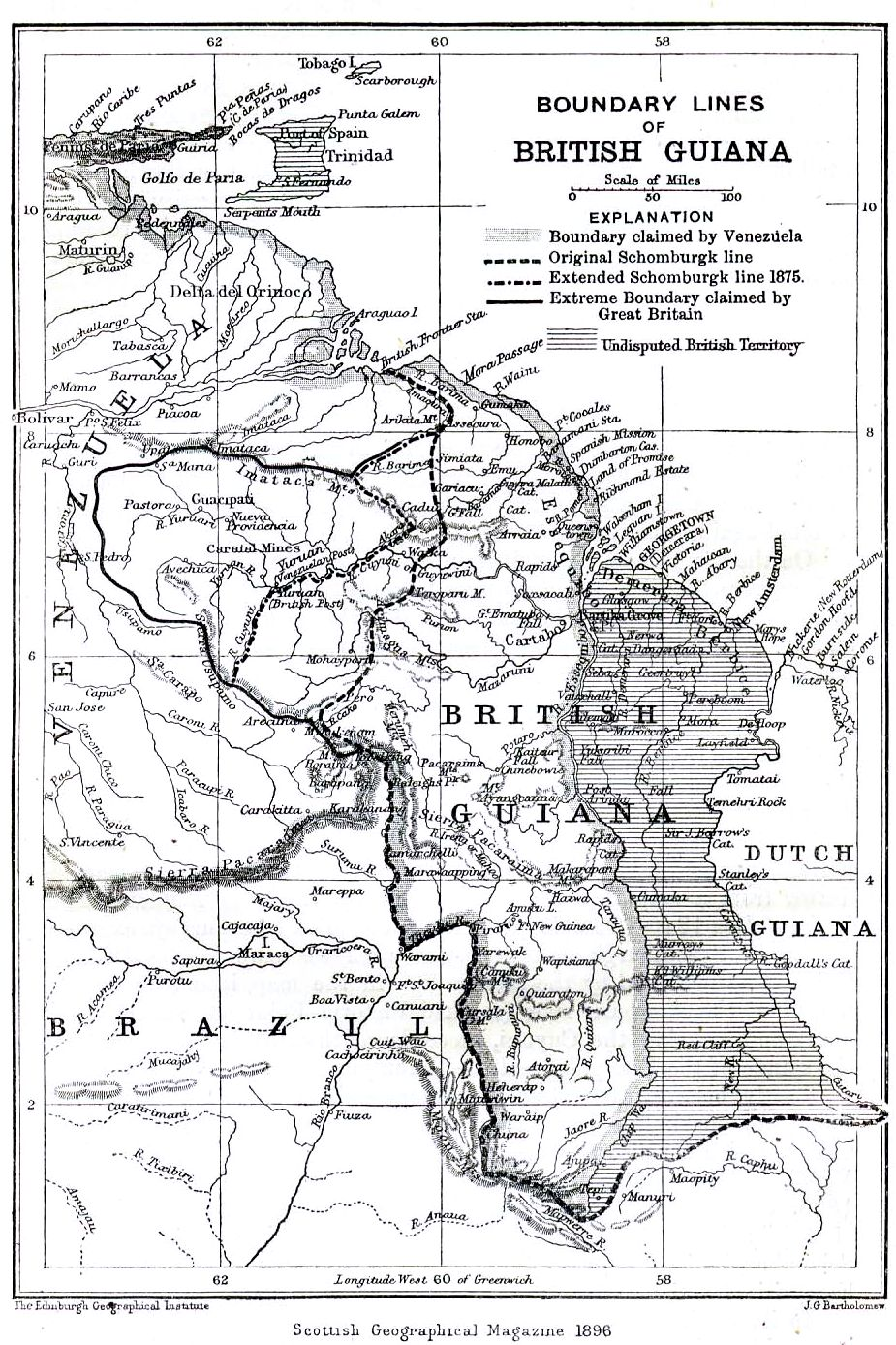
Map showing: * The extreme border claimed by Britain * The current boundary (roughly) and * The extreme border claimed by Venezuela

The Venezuelan crisis of 1895 (Note: Sometimes called the "first Venezuelan crisis", the crisis of 1902–1903 being the second.) occurred over Venezuela's longstanding dispute with the United Kingdom about the territory of Essequibo, which Britain believed was part of British Guiana and Venezuela recognized as its own Guayana Esequiba. The issue became more acute with the development of gold mining in the region.

As the dispute became a crisis, the key issue became Britain's refusal to include in the proposed international arbitration the territory east of the "Schomburgk Line", which a surveyor had drawn half-a-century earlier as a boundary between Venezuela and the former Dutch territory ceded by the Dutch in the Anglo-Dutch Treaty of 1814, later part of British Guiana. The crisis ultimately saw Britain accept the United States' intervention in the dispute to force arbitration of the entire disputed territory, and tacitly accept the US right to intervene under the Monroe Doctrine. A tribunal convened in Paris in 1898 to decide the matter, and in 1899 awarded the bulk of the disputed territory to British Guiana.

The dispute had become a diplomatic crisis in 1895 when a lobbyist for Venezuela William Lindsay Scruggs sought to argue that British behaviour over the issue violated the 1823 Monroe Doctrine and used his influence in Washington, DC, to pursue the matter. US President Grover Cleveland adopted a broad interpretation of the Doctrine that forbade new European colonies but also declared an American interest in any matter in the hemisphere. British Prime Minister Lord Salisbury and the British ambassador to Washington, Julian Pauncefote, misjudged the importance the American government placed on the dispute, prolonging the crisis before ultimately accepting the American demand for arbitration of the entire territory.

By standing with a Latin American nation against European colonial powers, Cleveland improved relations with the United States' southern neighbors, but the cordial manner in which the negotiations were conducted also made for good relations with Britain. However, by backing down in the face of a strong US declaration of a strong interpretation of the Monroe Doctrine, Britain tacitly accepted it, and the crisis thus provided a basis for the expansion of US interventionism in the Americas. Leading British historian Robert Arthur Humphreys later called the crisis "one of the most momentous episodes in the history of Anglo-American relations in general and of Anglo-American rivalries in Latin America in particular."

== Background ==
By 1895, the dispute between Britain and Venezuela over the territory of Guayana Esequiba, which Britain claimed as part of British Guiana and Venezuela saw as Venezuelan territory, had lasted for half a century. The territorial claims, originally those of the Spanish Empire, inherited by Venezuela after its independence in 1811, and of the Dutch Empire, inherited by the United Kingdom with the acquisition of the Dutch territories of Essequibo, Demerara and Berbice in 1814, had remained unsettled over previous centuries. Over the course of the 19th century, Britain and Venezuela had proved no more able to reach an agreement until matters came to a head in 1895, after seven years of severed diplomatic relations.

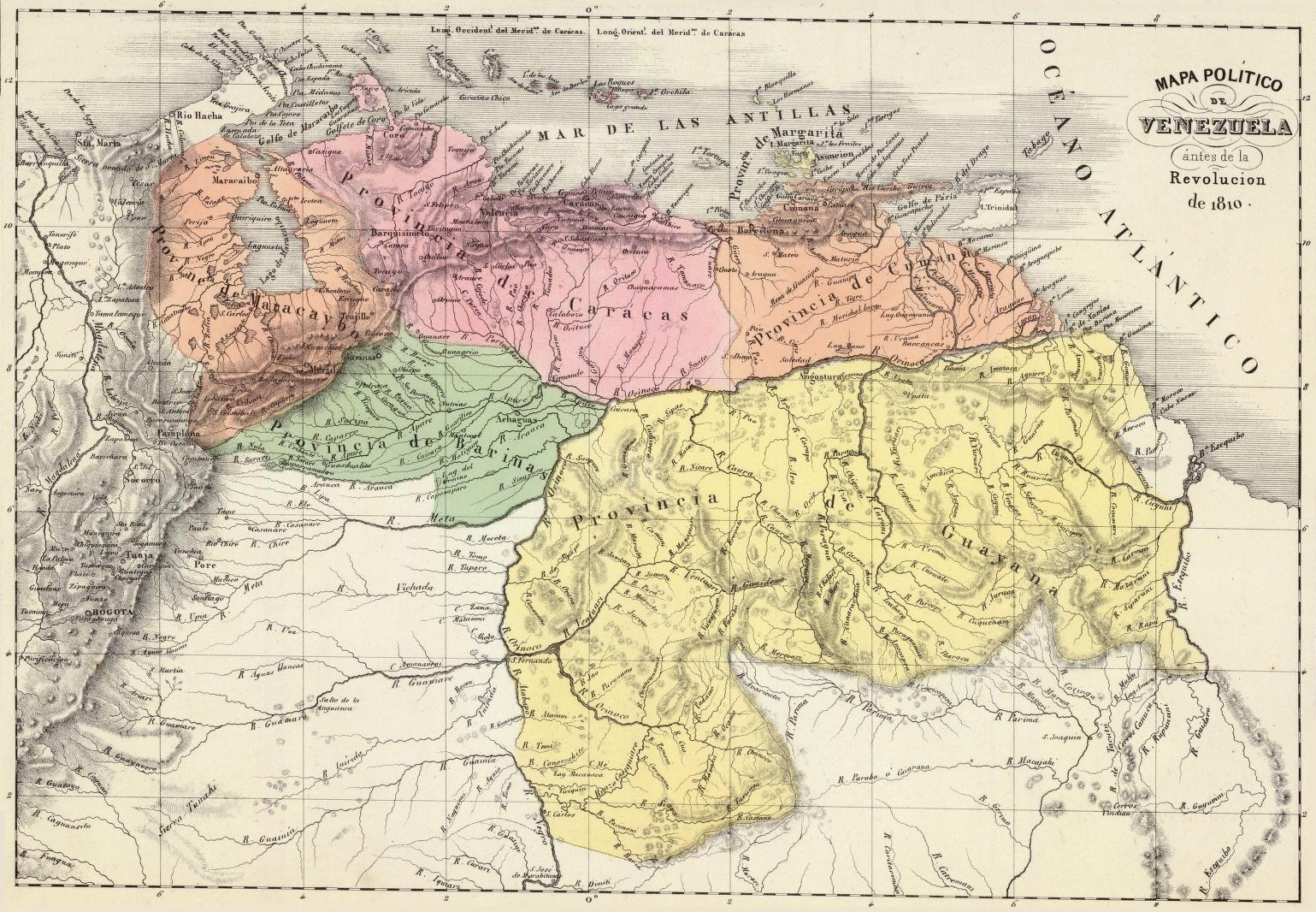
Venezuela map (1810) showing the border with the Essequibo river.

The basis of the discussions between Venezuela and the United Kingdom lay in Britain's advocacy of a particular division of the territory deriving from a mid-19th-century survey that it had commissioned. That survey originated with German naturalist Robert Schomburgk's four-year expedition for the Royal Geographical Society in 1835 to 1839, which resulted in a sketch of the territory with a line marking what he believed to be the western boundary claimed by the Dutch. He was thus commissioned by the British government to carry out a survey of Guiana's boundaries. The result was the "Schomburgk Line", which he established partly to follow natural divisions and partly to distinguish territory of Spanish or Venezuelan occupation from that which had been occupied by the Dutch. The line went well beyond the area of British occupation and gave British Guiana control of the mouth of the Orinoco River.

In 1844, Venezuela declared the Essequibo River the dividing line; a British offer the same year to make major alterations to the line and cede the mouth of the Orinoco and much associated territory was ignored. No treaty between Britain and Venezuela was reached until 1850 agreement not to encroach on disputed territory.

On 5 May 1859, Venezuela and Brazil signed a treaty to delimit their borders. It was agreed that the Orinoco and Essequibo river basins would be recognized as Venezuela's, while the Amazon river basin would be recognized as Brazil's.

The dispute went unmentioned for many years until gold was discovered in the region, which disrupted relations between the United Kingdom and Venezuela. In 1876, gold mines inhabited mainly by English-speaking people had been established in the Cuyuni basin, which was Venezuelan territory beyond the Schomburgk line but within the area Schomburgk thought Britain could claim. That year, Venezuela reiterated its claim up to the Essequibo River, to which the British responded with a counterclaim including the entire Cuyuni basin, although this was a paper claim the British never intended to pursue.

In 1886, Schomburgk's initial sketch, which had been published in 1840, was the only version of the "Schomburgk Line" published in British maps. That led to accusations by US President Grover Cleveland that the line had been extended "in some mysterious way".

In October 1886, Britain declared the line to be the provisional frontier of British Guiana, and in February 1887 Venezuela severed diplomatic relations. Proposals for a renewal of relations and settlement of the dispute failed repeatedly. By summer 1894, diplomatic relations had been severed for seven years, the dispute having dragged on for half a century. In addition, both sides had established police or military stations at key points in the area, partly to defend claims to the Caratal goldfield of the region's Yuruari basin, which was within Venezuelan territory but claimed by the British. The mine at El Callao, started in 1871, was once one of the richest in the world, and the goldfields as a whole saw over a million ounces exported between 1860 and 1883. The gold mining was dominated by immigrants from the British Isles and the British West Indies, giving an appearance of almost creating a British colony on Venezuelan territory.

Venezuela had in the course of the dispute repeatedly appealed to the US and to the Monroe Doctrine, but the US government had declined to involve itself. That changed after Venezuela obtained the services of William Lindsay Scruggs. Scruggs, a former US ambassador to Colombia and Venezuela, was recruited in 1893 by the Venezuelan government to operate on its behalf in Washington D.C. as a lobbyist and legal attache. Scruggs had apparently resigned his ambassadorship to Venezuela in December 1892 but had been dismissed by the US for bribing the President of Venezuela. As a lobbyist, Scruggs published an October 1894 pamphlet, British Aggressions in Venezuela:, or the Monroe Doctrine on Trial in which he attacked "British aggression" and claimed that Venezuela was anxious to arbitrate over the Venezuela-British Guiana border dispute. Scruggs also claimed that British policies in the disputed territory violated the Monroe Doctrine of 1823. For much of the 19th century, it had only rarely been invoked by the United States, but a "paradigm shift in U.S. foreign relations in the late nineteenth century" saw Americans more actively support their increasingly-significant economic interests in Central and South America. The "'new diplomacy' thrust the United States more emphatically into the imperial struggle". It was in that context that Scruggs sought to draw on the Doctrine in Venezuela's interests.

== Crisis ==
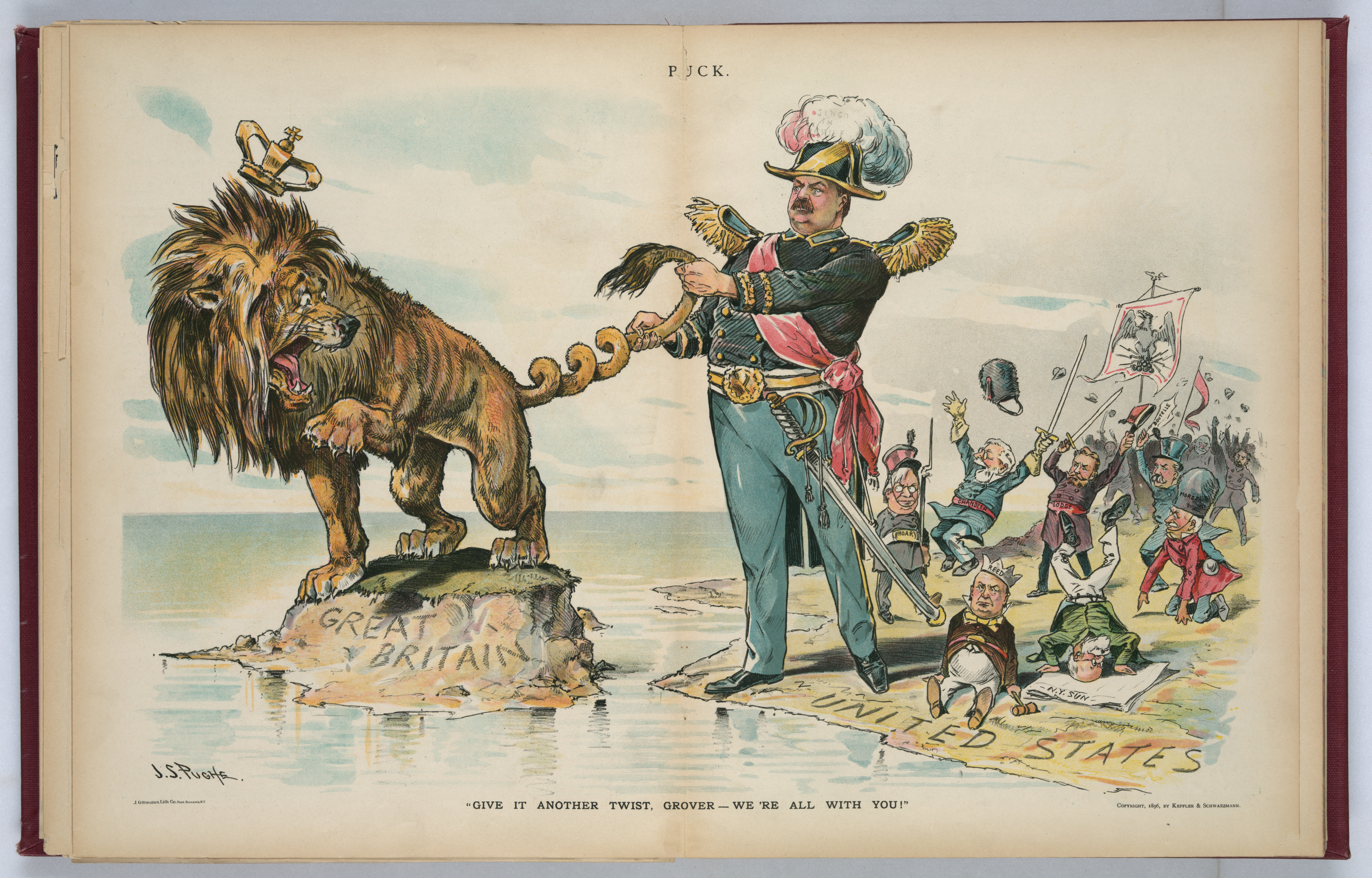
President Cleveland twist the tail of the British Lion; cartoon in Puck by J.S. Pughe, 1895

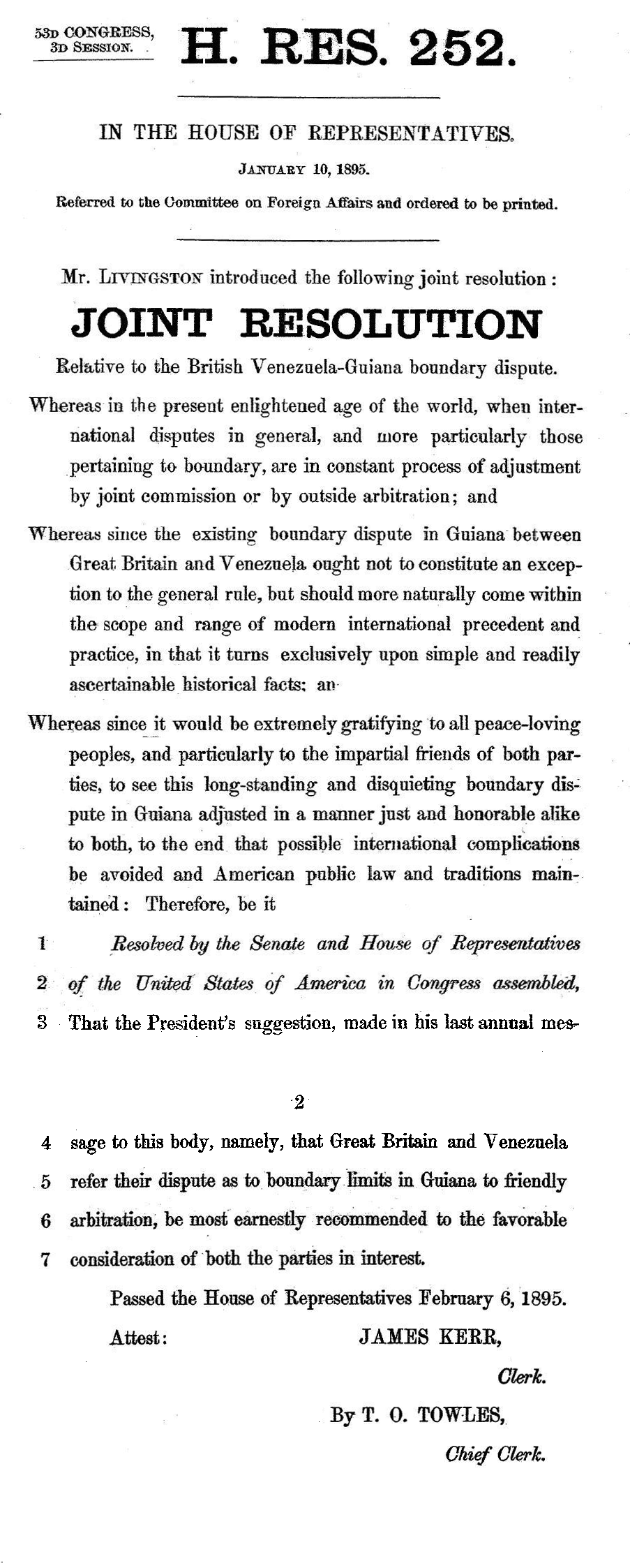
House Resolution 252

Scruggs collaborated with Georgian compatriot Representative Leonidas Livingston to propose House of Representatives Resolution 252 to the third session of the 53rd United States Congress. The bill recommended Venezuela and the United Kingdom settle the dispute by arbitration. President Grover Cleveland signed it on 22 February 1895, after passing both houses of the United States Congress. The vote had been unanimous.

On 27 April 1895, the Royal Navy occupied the Nicaraguan port of Corinto, after a number of British subjects, including the vice-consul, had been seized during disturbances, shortly after the former protectorate of the Mosquito Coast had been incorporated into Nicaragua. The British demanded an indemnity of £15,000. US Secretary of State Walter Q. Gresham thought the demands harsh, but also that they should be met. US public opinion, however, was outraged at the British military activity in the US sphere of influence.

In July 1895, new Secretary of State Richard Olney (succeeding Gresham, who died in office at the end of May) sent a document to London which became known as "Olney's twenty-inch gun" (the draft was 12,000 words long). The note reviewed the history of the Anglo-Venezuelan dispute and of the Monroe Doctrine, and it firmly insisted on the application of the Doctrine to the case, declaring that "today the United States is practically sovereign on this continent, and its fiat is law upon the subjects to which it confines its interposition." The President, the Secretary of State, and the US public "had been brought to believe that Britain was in the wrong, that the vital interests of the United States were involved, and the United States must intervene." The note had little impact on the British government, partly because Joseph Chamberlain, at the Colonial Office, thought it possible that the colony had a major gold-bearing region around the Schomburgk line and partly because the British rejected the idea that the Monroe Doctrine had any relevance for the boundary dispute. A reply to Olney's note directly challenged his interpretation of the Monroe Doctrine:

The Government of the United States is not entitled to affirm as a universal proposition, with reference to a number of independent States for whose conduct it assumes no responsibility, that its interests are necessarily concerned in whatever may befall those States, simply because they are situated in the Western Hemisphere."

By 17 December 1895, Cleveland delivered an address to the United States Congress reaffirming the Monroe Doctrine and its relevance to the dispute. The address asked Congress to fund a commission to study the boundaries between Venezuela and British Guiana, and declared it the duty of the United States "to resist by every means in its power as a willful aggression upon its rights and interests" any British attempt to exercise jurisdiction over territory the United States judged Venezuelan. The address was perceived as direct threat of war with the United Kingdom if the British did not comply, but Cleveland had not committed himself to accepting the commission's report or specified any details on how the commission would act. Despite the public belligerence, neither the British nor the American governments had any interest in war.

On 18 December 1895, Congress approved $100,000 for the United States Commission on the Boundary Between Venezuela and British Guiana. It was formally established on 1 January 1896. Historian George Lincoln Burr, who contributed to the commission's historical research, argued shortly after the Commission concluded its work that it made a major contribution to clarifying issues of historical fact in the dispute. The commission's work, he wrote, helped the disputing parties to focus on issues of fact supportable by evidence (as opposed to mere assertions), and by the time the Arbitration process was under way, the commission's own view of historical facts was largely accepted by the parties "so that their main issue [was] now in the main one of law, not of fact."

== Arbitration ==
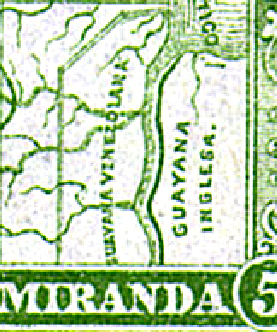
Venezuela supported its claim by printing an 1896 postage stamp with a map showing the Guianas up to the east bank of the Essequibo River as "Guayana Venezolana".

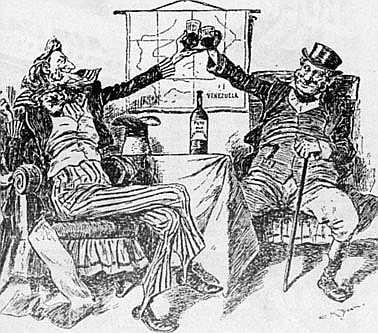
An 1896 cartoon from an American newspaper, following Britain's agreement to go to arbitration. A report following the Venezuela Crisis of 1895 highlighting the work of historian James Rodway in building for the case of British Guiana.

In January 1896, the British government decided in effect to recognise the US right to intervene in the boundary dispute and accepted arbitration in principle without insisting on the Schomburgk line as a basis for negotiation. Negotiations between the US and Britain over the details of the arbitration followed, and Britain was able to persuade the US of many of its views, even as it became clear that the eventual report of the Boundary Commission would likely be negative towards the British claims. An agreement between the US and the UK was signed on 12 November 1896. Cleveland's Boundary Commission suspended its work in November 1896, but it still went on to produce a large report.

The agreement provided for a tribunal with two members representing Venezuela (but chosen by the US Supreme Court), two members chosen by the British government, and fifth member chosen by those four, who would preside. Venezuelan President Joaquín Crespo referred to a sense of "national humiliation", and the treaty was modified so that the Venezuelan President would nominate a tribunal member. However it was understood that his choice would not be a Venezuelan, and in fact, he nominated the Chief Justice of the United States. Ultimately, on 2 February 1897, the Treaty of Washington between Venezuela and the United Kingdom was signed, and ratified several months later.

After the US and Britain had nominated their arbitrators, Britain proposed that the disputing parties agree on the presiding fifth arbitrator. There were delays in discussing that and in the interim, Martens was among the names of international jurists suggested by the US. Martens was then chosen by Venezuela from a shortlist of names submitted by Britain. The Panel of Arbitration thus consisted of:

1. Melville Weston Fuller (Chief Justice of the United States)
2. David Josiah Brewer (Member of the US Supreme Court)
3. Sir Richard Henn Collins (Lord Justice of Appeal)
4. Lord Herschell (former Lord Chancellor), replaced upon his death by Charles Russell (Lord Chief Justice of England and Wales)
5. Friedrich Martens (diplomat of Russia and jurist)

Venezuela's senior counsel was former US President Benjamin Harrison, assisted by Severo Mallet-Prevost, Benjamin F. Tracy, James R. Soley, and José María Rojas. The country had been represented by James J. Storrow until his unexpected death on 15 April 1897. Britain was represented by its Attorney General, Richard Webster, assisted by Robert Reid, George Askwith and Sidney Rowlatt, with Sir Frederick Pollock preparing the original outline of Britain's argument. The parties had eight months to prepare their case, another four months to reply to the other party's case, and another three months for the final printed case. The final arguments were submitted in December 1898, with the total evidence and testimony amounting to 23 volumes.

Britain's key argument was that prior to Venezuela's independence, Spain had not taken effective possession of the disputed territory and said that the local Indians had had alliances with the Dutch, which gave them a sphere of influence that the British acquired in 1814. After fifty-five days of hearings, the arbitrators retired for six days. The American arbitrators found the British argument preposterous since American Indians had never been considered to have any sovereignty. However, the British had the advantage that Martens wanted a unanimous decision, and the British threatened to ignore the award if it did not suit them. They were also able to argue a loss of equity since under the terms of the treaty lands occupied for 50 years would receive title, and a number of British gold mines would be narrowly lost to that cutoff if their lands were awarded to Venezuela.

With the Treaty of Washington, Great Britain and Venezuela both agreed that the arbitral ruling in Paris would be a "full, perfect, and final settlement" (Article XIII) to the border dispute.

== Outcome ==
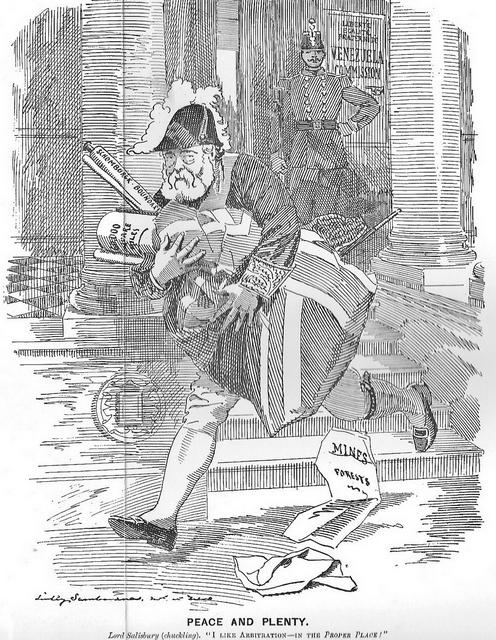
Punch cartoon after the conclusion of the Tribunal of Arbitration. PEACE AND PLENTY. Lord Salisbury (chuckling). "I like arbitration — In the PROPER PLACE!"

Sitting in Paris, the Tribunal of Arbitration finalized its decision on 3 October 1899. The award was unanimous but gave no reasons for the decision, merely describing the resulting boundary, which gave Britain almost 90% of the disputed territory. The Schomburgk Line was, with small deviations, re-established as the border between British Guiana and Venezuela. The first deviation from the Schomburgk line was that Venezuela's territory included Barima Point at the mouth of the Orinoco, giving it undisputed control of the river and thus the ability to levy duties on Venezuelan commerce. The second was drawing the border at the Wenamu River rather than the Cuyuni River, giving Venezuela a substantial territory east of the line that Britain had originally refused to include in the arbitration. However, Britain received most of the disputed territory and all of the gold mines.

The reaction to the award was surprise, the award's lack of reasoning being a particular concern. Though the Venezuelans were keenly disappointed with the outcome, they honoured their counsel for their efforts (their delegation's Secretary, Severo Mallet-Prevost, received the Order of the Liberator in 1944), and abided by the award.

The Anglo-Venezuelan boundary dispute asserted for the first time a more outward-looking American foreign policy, particularly in the Americas, marking the United States as a world power. That was the earliest example of modern interventionism under the Monroe Doctrine in which the USA exercised its claimed prerogatives in the Americas.

== Aftermath ==
The Olney–Pauncefote Treaty of 1897 was a proposed treaty between the United States and Britain in 1897 that would have required arbitration of major disputes. The treaty was rejected by the US Senate and never went into effect.

The 1895 dispute between the US and Britain over Venezuela was peacefully resolved through arbitration. Both nations realized that a mechanism was desirable to avoid possible future conflicts. US Secretary of State Richard Olney in January 1897 negotiated an arbitration treaty with the British diplomat Julian Pauncefote. President William McKinley supported the treaty, as did most opinion leaders, academics, and leading newspapers. In Britain, it was promoted by pacifist Liberal MP for Haggerston Randal Cremer; while main opposition came from Irish-Americans, who held a very negative view of Britain because of its treatment of Ireland.

In the US Senate, however, a series of amendments exempted important issues from any sort of arbitration. Any issue that was not exempted would need two thirds of the Senate before arbitration could begin. Virtually nothing was left of the original proposal, and the Senate in May 1897 voted 43 in favor to 26 opposed, three votes short of what was needed. The Senate was jealous of its control over treaties and was susceptible to a certain deep-rooted Anglophobia.

Despite its disappointment with the award of Paris Tribunal of Arbitration, Venezuela abided by it. However, half a century later, the publication of an alleged political deal between Russia and Britain led Venezuela to reassert its claims. In 1949, the US jurist Otto Schoenrich gave the Venezuelan government the Memorandum of Severo Mallet-Prevost (Official Secretary of the U.S./Venezuela delegation in the Tribunal of Arbitration), written in 1944 to be published only after Mallet-Prevost's death. That reopened the issues, with Mallet-Prevost surmising a political deal between Russia and Britain from the subsequent private behaviour of the judges. Mallet-Prevost said that Martens had visited England with the two British arbitrators in the summer of 1899 and had offered the two American judges a choice between accepting a unanimous award along the lines ultimately agreed or a 3–2 majority opinion even more favourable to the British. The alternative would have followed the Schomburgk Line entirely and given the mouth of the Orinoco to the British. Mallet-Prevost said that the American judges and Venezuelan counsel were disgusted at the situation and considered the 3-2 option with a strongly-worded minority opinion but ultimately went along with Martens to avoid depriving Venezuela of valuable territory to which it was entitled.

As a result of Mallet-Prevost's claims, Venezuela revived its claim to the disputed territory in 1962. In 2018, Guyana has applied to the International Court of Justice to get a declaration that the 1899 Award is valid and binding upon Guyana and Venezuela and that the boundary established by that Award and the 1905 Agreement is valid.

== See also ==
- The Monroe Doctrine (1896 film) – US propaganda film
