= Guayana Esequiba =

Disputed territory in South America

Coordinates: 6.3°N 59.7°W

- Disputed territory
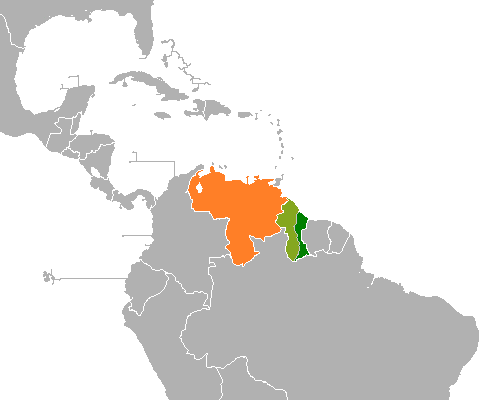
- Guayana Esequiba is in light green, with the rest of Guyana in dark green. Venezuela is shown in orange.
- Administrating country: Guyana
- Claimant country: Venezuela
- Guyanese division: As part of six regions (Note: Barima-Waini, Pomeroon-Supenaam, Essequibo Islands-West Demerara, Cuyuni-Mazaruni, Potaro-Siparuni and Upper Takutu-Upper Essequibo)
- Venezuelan division: As part of two states: Bolívar and Delta Amacuro

Area
  - Total: 159,500 km^{2} (61,600 sq mi)

Population (2012)
  - Total: approx. 128,000
  - Density: 0.8/km^{2} (2.1/sq mi)
- Time zone: UTC– 04:00 (AST)

Guayana Esequiba (Spanish pronunciation: [ɡwaˈʝana eseˈkiβa]), also called Esequibo or Essequibo, is a disputed territory of 159,500 km^{2} (61,600 sq mi) west of the Essequibo River. The territory is subject to the Guyana–Venezuela territorial dispute, being controlled by Guyana based on the 1899 Paris Arbitral Award but also claimed by Venezuela. The boundary dispute was inherited from the colonial powers (Spain in the case of Venezuela, and the Netherlands and the United Kingdom in the case of Guyana) and has persisted following the independence of Venezuela and Guyana.

The status of the territory is subject to the Geneva Agreement, which was signed by the United Kingdom, Venezuela, and British Guiana on 17 February 1966. This treaty stipulates that the parties will agree to find a practical, peaceful, and satisfactory solution to the dispute. Should there be a stalemate, according to the treaty, the decision as to the means of settlement is to be referred to an "appropriate international organ" or, failing agreement on this point, to the Secretary-General of the United Nations.

Currently, Venezuela claims all of the land west of the Essequibo river, which it refers to as Zona en Reclamación or Zone in Reclamation. Historically, this did not include the tributaries of the Amazon river and the Pirara area which were only ceded to British Guiana in 1904 during arbitration with Brazil. The Northwestern border of Guayana Esequiba follows the 1905 border as established by the British-Venezuelan Mixed Boundary Commission, in accordance with the Arbitral Award of 3 October 1899. Venezuela currently seeks to abrogate the legal borders and currently agrees only to the Essequibo River boundary.

== Demographics ==
At the time of the 2023 Venezuelan referendum which included a question about granting citizenship to those living in the disputed region, the estimated population in Essequibo was around 125,000 inhabitants.

== Political division ==
The territory is divided by Guyana into six administrative regions: Barima-Waini, Cuyuni-Mazaruni, Pomeroon-Supenaam, Potaro-Siparuni, Upper Takutu-Upper Essequibo and Essequibo Islands-West Demerara. Venezuela often depicts it on the map as a striped region. Venezuela seeks to incorporate Guayana Esequiba as a 24th state into the Guayana Region.

== Territorial organization ==
Map of Guyana showing regions 1 (Barima-Waini), 2 (Cuyuni-Mazaruni), 7 (Pomeroon-Supenaam), 8 (Potaro-Siparuni), 10 (Upper Takutu-Upper Essequibo) and the western part of 5 (Essequibo Islands-West Demerara) under claim.

=== In Guyana ===
According to the administrative division of Guyana, Equatorial Guiana would comprise the entire Barima-Waini, Pomeroon-Supenaam and Cuyuni-Mazaruni regions; most of the Upper Takutu-Upper Essequibo and Potaro-Siparuni regions; and the western part of the Essequibo Islands-West Demerara region (the latter three have sectors on both sides of the main channel of the Essequibo River). Each region is administered by a Regional Democratic Council (RDC), which is headed by a Chief or Chairman.

Regions of Guyana claimed in whole or in part by Venezuela as part of Essequiba Guyana
Number	Regiona's name	Surface (km²)	Population (2012)
Region 1	Barima-Waini	20 339	26 941
Region 2	Pomeroon-Supenaam	6195	46 810
Region 3	Essequibo Islands-West Demerara	3755	107 416
Region 7	Cuyuni-Mazaruni	47 213	20 280
Region 8	Potaro-Siparuni	20 051	10 190
Region 9	Upper Takutu-Upper Essequibo	57 750	24 212

*(The data for regions 3, 8 and 9 include the sectors located east of the main channel of the Essequibo River, which are not claimed by Venezuela.)

=== In Venezuela ===
Among his decrees shortly after the referendum, Venezuelan president Nicolás Maduro ordered the publication of a new map, including the Esequibo territory, "in all schools, public entities, universities and 'in all homes' in the country"

According to some interpretations of Venezuelan legislation, Essequiba Guyana is an integral part of the jurisdiction of the states of Bolívar and Delta Amacuro, whose common boundary runs along the cusp of the Imataka mountain range.

The state of Bolívar, in its constitution, establishes the following:

Article 15º The territory and other geographical spaces of the State of Bolivar are those that historically corresponded to the Guayana Province of the Captaincy General of Venezuela, before the political transformation initiated on 19 April 1810, then delimited in accordance with the Political Territorial Law of the Republic of 28 April 1856, with the modifications that have resulted from the laws of the Republic, the agreements and other legal acts validly celebrated in accordance with the Constitution, the national laws and the laws of the State. In all acts of the State, in which its territory is described or referred to, the reservation that the Arbitral Award of Paris of 1899 is void and null, according to the principles of law and justice that govern the international community and contribute to affirm territorial integrity, shall be understood to be incorporated, even if not expressly so, in all acts of the State. The State of Bolivar will collaborate and support the Bolivarian Republic of Venezuela in the achievement of a satisfactory solution for the practical settlement of the territorial dispute, based on the Geneva Agreement of 17 February 1966.

The original territory of what is now the state of Delta Amacuro extends from the Orinoco delta to the Esequibo River. The information website of the governor's office of this state states the following about its territoriality:

When the Federal Territory of Delta Amacuro was created, it had an area of 63,667 km², and currently has 40,200 km². The difference between these two areas was lost by the Delta Amacuro due to the Paris Arbitral Award signed on 3 October 1899, by which 23,467 km² of its territory was taken away by English Guyana.

Historically in Venezuela, the central power (government and other Venezuelan state agencies) has been directly in charge of the treatment of the case of Guayana Esequiba, leaving the local governors' and mayors' offices with very little participation and power of action. A special and differentiated treatment is given to the jurisdictions of these national states, which do not usually include in their maps their territorial portion within the Guayana Esequiba, although in the national maps of the country the inclusion of the area under claim is mandatory. This has led some people to erroneously think that the Guayana Esequiba is a new Venezuelan state or federal territory.

In 1999, when the new Venezuelan magna carta was enacted, Article 10 of the Constitution of the Venezuela established the following as Venezuelan territory:

The territory and other geographic spaces of the Republic are those that corresponded to the Captaincy General of Venezuela before the political transformation initiated on 19 April 1810, with the modifications resulting from treaties and arbitration awards not vitiated by nullity.

In August 2015, some deputies of the Venezuelan National Assembly proposed the creation of a 25th state (Estado Esequibo) uniting the territory of Guayana Esequiba (159,500 square kilometers) and the Sifontes Municipality (24,393 square kilometers), with capital in Tumeremo, the latter territory currently under the jurisdiction of the state of Bolivar. The proposal was officially introduced before the secretariat of the National Assembly, but was not approved.

== Territorial dispute ==
In 1840, the British government commissioned German-born explorer and naturalist Robert Hermann Schomburgk to survey British Guiana's boundaries. This survey resulted in what came to be known as the "Schomburgk Line", which went well beyond the area of British occupation and gave British Guiana control of the mouth of the Orinoco River. These borders were disputed by Venezuela, and tensions worsened after the discovery of gold mines in the region in 1876, culminating with Venezuela severing diplomatic relations with the United Kingdom in 1887. The United Kingdom and Venezuela went into arbitration with mediation from the United States, which resulted in the Paris Arbitral Award in 1899 and ruled largely in favour of Britain. In 1949, a memorandum written by Severo Mallet-Prevost, official secretary of the US–Venezuela delegation in the arbitration, and published posthumously stated that the Arbitral Award resulted from the pressure by the Tribunal President Friedrich Martens and a political deal between Russia and Britain. Said memorandum led to complaints by Venezuela in the United Nations in 1962, which resulted in the Geneva Agreement, signed with the United Kingdom in 1966.

The Secretary-General referred the entire matter to the International Court of Justice (ICJ). On 18 December 2020, the ICJ accepted the case submitted by Guyana to settle the dispute. In December 2023, Venezuela held a referendum asking the Venezuelan electorate whether the region should become a state of Venezuela and its population become citizens, where it declared that the results showed overwhelming support for such action. No vote was held in the disputed region.

== See also ==
- Borders of Venezuela
- Essequibo (colony)
- Guyana–Venezuela relations
- Tigri Area, another territorial dispute involving Suriname
