= Port of Spain Protocol =

Protocol to the Agreement to resolve the controversy between Venezuela and the United Kingdom of Great Britain and Northern Ireland over the frontier between Venezuela and British Guiana
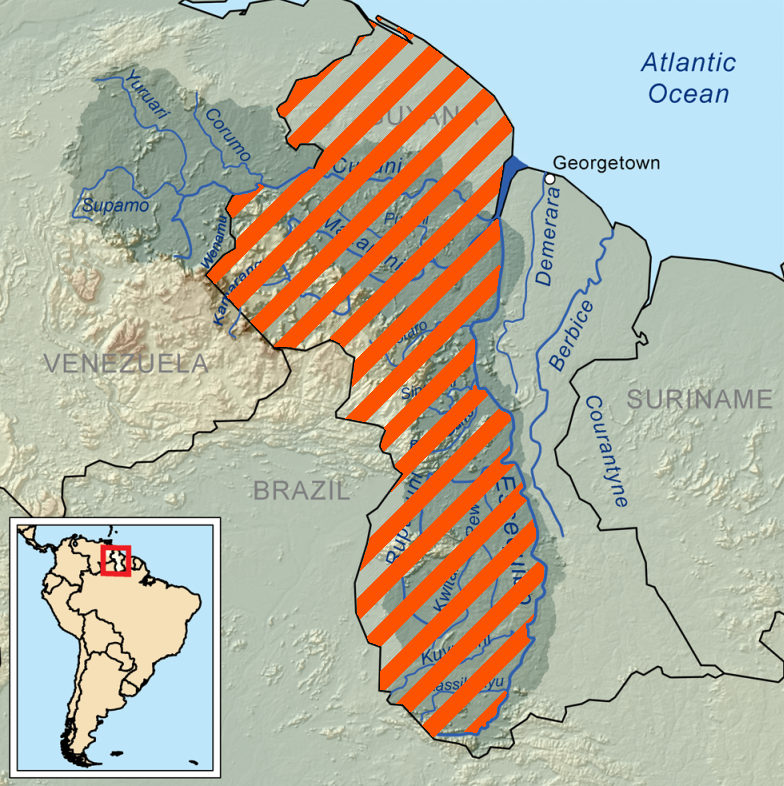
- Map of Essequibo; The area lined in orange constitutes the area claimed by Venezuela.
- Type: Procedural and supplementary treaty to another international treaty.
- Drafted: March-June 1970
- Signed: June 18, 1970
- Location: Port of Spain, Trinidad and Tobago
- Effective: Never enforced
- Expiry: June 18, 1982; 44 years ago
- Signatories: Guyana; United Kingdom; Republic of Venezuela
- Depositary: United Nations

The Protocol to the Agreement to resolve the controversy between Venezuela and the United Kingdom of Great Britain and Northern Ireland over the frontier between Venezuela and British Guiana, simply known as the Port of Spain Protocol, is a protocol of the 1966 Geneva Agreement between Guyana and Venezuela and a 12-year moratorium on Venezuela's reclamation of Guayana Esequiba.

== Protocol ==
In 1970, after the expiration of the Mixed Commission established according to the Geneva Agreement, Presidents Rafael Caldera and Forbes Burnham signed the Port of Spain Protocol, which declared a 12-year moratorium on Venezuela's reclamation of Guayana Esequiba, with the purpose of allowing both governments to promote cooperation and understanding while the border claim was in abeyance. The protocol was formally signed by the Minister of Foreign Affairs of Venezuela Aristides Calvani, Guyana State Minister for Foreign Affairs Shridath Ramphal and British High Commissioner to Trinidad and Tobago Roland Hunte. The Parliament of Guyana voted for the agreement on 22 June 1970, with only People's Progressive Party voting against believing that the United Nations should resolve the matter. MPs from almost all parties in the Parliament of Venezuela voiced their sharp criticism of the agreement. Venezuelan maps produced since 1970 show the entire area from the eastern bank of the Essequibo, including the islands in the river, as Venezuelan territory. On some maps, the western Essequibo region is called the "Zone in Reclamation".

In 1983, the deadline of the Port of Spain Protocol expired, and the Venezuelan President Luis Herrera Campins decided not to extend it anymore and resume the effective claim over the territory. Since then, the contacts between Venezuela and Guyana within the provisions of the Treaty of Geneva are under the recommendations of a UN Secretary General's representative, who can occasionally be changed under agreement by both parties.
