= Paris Arbitral Award =

1899 international arbitration decision

The Paris Arbitral Award is an arbitral award issued on 3 October 1899 by an arbitral tribunal convened in Paris, created two years earlier as established in the Arbitral Treaty of Washington D. C. on 2 February 1897, in which the United States (representing Venezuela) on the one hand and the United Kingdom (as owner of the colony of British Guiana, currently Guyana) on the other, had agreed to submit to international arbitration the dispute over the border to the west of the British colony and the east of independent Venezuela, as a mechanism for an amicable solution to the territorial differendum.

Venezuela protested the award in 1962 before the United Nations after the publication of the Mallet-Prevost Memorandum. This event led to the signing of Geneva Agreement on 17 February 1966, between both parties plus the presence of the local government of British Guiana, close to receiving independence, at which time it would replace the United Kingdom in the issue of the territorial differendum with Venezuela. The Venezuelan claim regarding the validity of the Arbitral Award was acknowledged but a solution to the border controversy remains unresolved.

== Arbitration ==
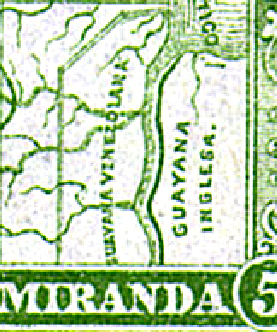
Venezuela supported its claim by printing an 1896 postage stamp with a map showing the Guianas up to the east bank of the Essequibo River as Guayana venezolana.

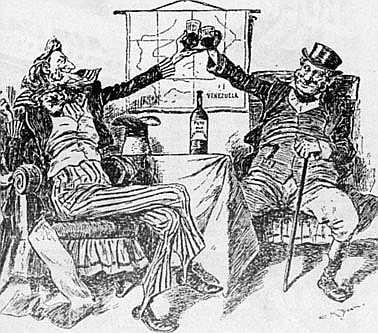
An 1896 cartoon from an American newspaper, following Britain's agreement to go to arbitration.

In January 1896, the British government decided in effect to recognise the US right to intervene in the boundary dispute and accepted arbitration in principle without insisting on the Schomburgk Line as a basis for negotiation. Negotiations between the US and Britain over the details of the arbitration followed, and Britain was able to persuade the US of many of its views, even as it became clear that the eventual report of the Boundary Commission would likely be negative towards the British claims. An agreement between the US and the UK was signed on 12 November 1896. Cleveland's Boundary Commission suspended its work in November 1896, but it still went on to produce a large report.

The agreement provided for a tribunal with two members representing Venezuela (but chosen by the US Supreme Court), two members chosen by the British government, and fifth member chosen by those four, who would preside. Venezuelan President Joaquín Crespo referred to a sense of "national humiliation", and the treaty was modified so that the Venezuelan President would nominate a tribunal member. However it was understood that his choice would not be a Venezuelan, and in fact, he nominated the Chief Justice of the United States. Ultimately, on 2 February 1897, the Treaty of Washington between Venezuela and the United Kingdom was signed, and ratified several months later.

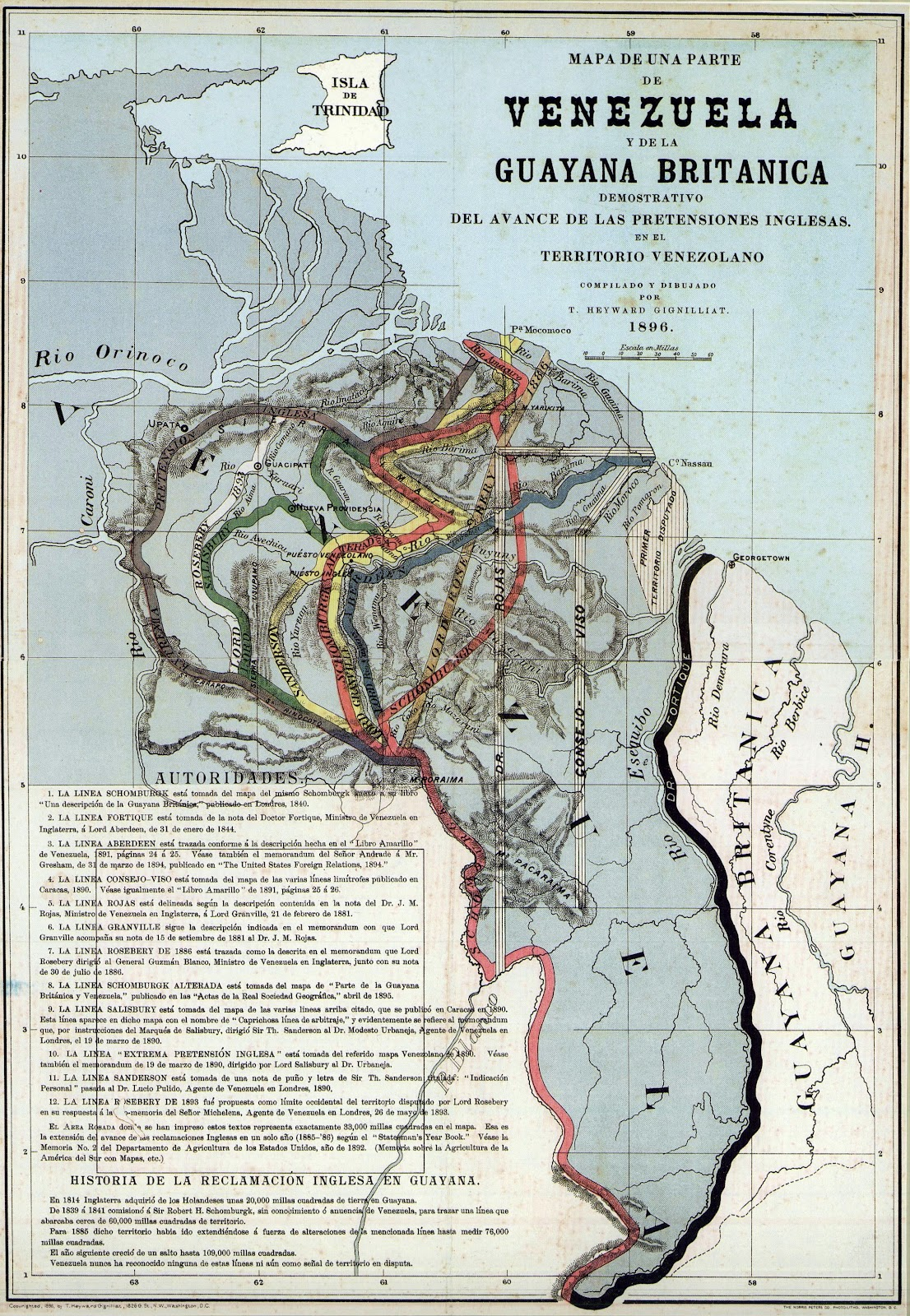
1896 map of former British Guiana and the various boundary lines drawn, showing the maximum aspirations of the English colony of British Guiana and the Essequibo River, which Venezuela considers its border; the gray area is the only territory not claimed by Venezuela, while part of the eastern sector (Pirara) was ceded by the United Kingdom to Brazil.

After the US and Britain had nominated their arbitrators, Britain proposed that the disputing parties agree on the presiding fifth arbitrator. There were delays in discussing that and in the interim, Martens was among the names of international jurists suggested by the US. Martens was then chosen by Venezuela from a shortlist of names submitted by Britain. The Panel of Arbitration thus consisted of:

1. Melville Weston Fuller (Chief Justice of the United States)
2. David Josiah Brewer (Member of the US Supreme Court)
3. Sir Richard Henn Collins (Lord Justice of Appeal)
4. Lord Herschell (former Lord Chancellor), replaced upon his death by Charles Russell (Lord Chief Justice of England and Wales)
5. Friedrich Martens (diplomat of Russia and jurist)

Venezuela's senior counsel was former US President Benjamin Harrison, assisted by Mexican-born, founding partner of Curtis, Mallet-Prevost, Colt & Mosle, Severo Mallet-Prevost; former Secretary of the Navy, Benjamin F. Tracy; former Assistant Secretary of the Navy James R. Soley; and Venezuelan diplomat and lawyer José María Rojas. The country had been represented by James J. Storrow until his unexpected death on 15 April 1897. Britain was represented by its Attorney General, Richard Webster, assisted by Robert Reid, George Askwith and Sidney Rowlatt, with Sir Frederick Pollock preparing the original outline of Britain's argument. The parties had eight months to prepare their case, another four months to reply to the other party's case, and another three months for the final printed case. The final arguments were submitted in December 1898, with the total evidence and testimony amounting to 23 volumes.

Britain's key argument was that prior to Venezuela's independence, Spain had not taken effective possession of the disputed territory and said that the local Indians had had alliances with the Dutch, which gave them a sphere of influence that the British acquired in 1814. After fifty-five days of hearings, the arbitrators retired for six days. The American arbitrators (Note: Former US President Benjamin Harrison served as an attorney for the Republic of Venezuela filed an 800-page brief and traveled to Paris, where he spent more than 25 hours in court on Venezuela's behalf. Although he lost the case, his legal arguments won him international renown.) found the British argument preposterous since American Indians had never been considered to have any sovereignty. However, the British had the advantage that Martens wanted a unanimous decision, and the British threatened to ignore the award if it did not suit them. They were also able to argue a loss of equity since under the terms of the treaty lands occupied for 50 years would receive title, and a number of British gold mines would be narrowly lost to that cutoff if their lands were awarded to Venezuela.

In accordance with Article XIII of the Treaty of Washington, the Paris Arbitral Award was to be considered a "full, perfect, and final settlement" to the border dispute, as agreed upon by Venezuela and the United Kingdom of Great Britain.

== Outcome ==
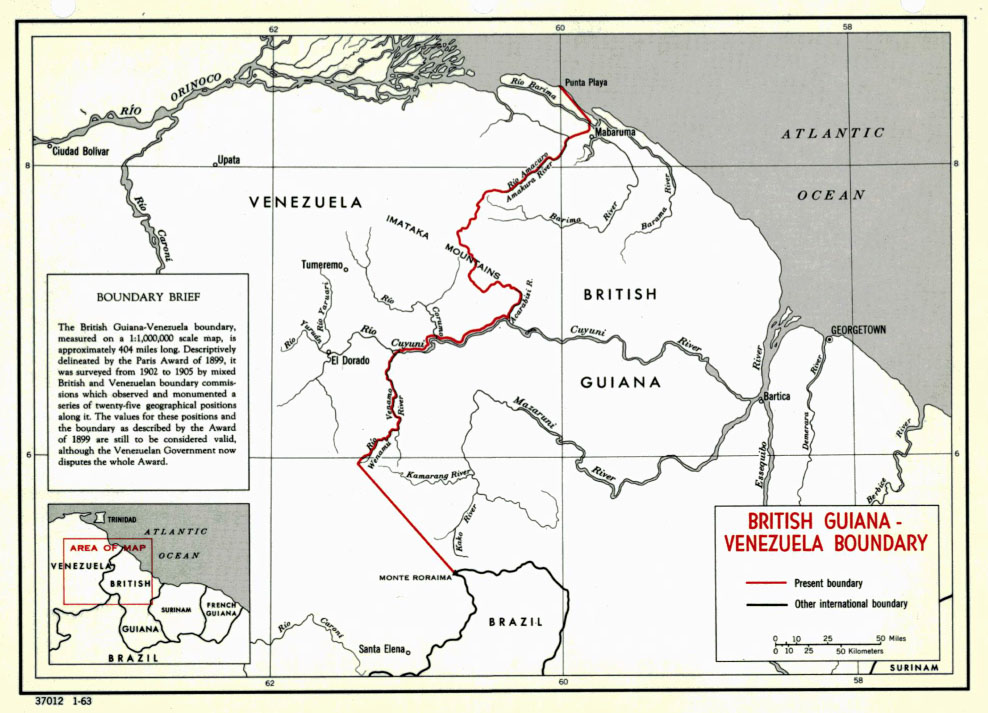
The demarcated border for Venezuela and British Guiana that was made legally binding in 1905 following the Arbitral Award of 1899. It established the first and only accepted boundary between Spanish-speaking Venezuela and its Anglophone counterpart.

Sitting in Paris, the Tribunal of Arbitration finalized its decision on 3 October 1899. The award was unanimous but gave no reasons for the decision, merely describing the resulting boundary, which gave Britain almost 90% of the disputed territory. The Schomburgk Line was, with small deviations, re-established as the border between British Guiana and Venezuela. The first deviation from the Schomburgk line was that Venezuela's territory included Barima Point at the mouth of the Orinoco, giving it undisputed control of the river and thus the ability to levy duties on Venezuelan commerce. The second was drawing the border at the Wenamu River rather than the Cuyuni River, giving Venezuela a substantial territory east of the line that Britain had originally refused to include in the arbitration. However, Britain received most of the disputed territory and all of the gold mines.

The reaction to the award was surprise, the award's lack of reasoning being a particular concern. Though the Venezuelans were keenly disappointed with the outcome, they honoured their counsel for their efforts (their delegation's Secretary, Severo Mallet-Prevost, received the Order of the Liberator in 1944), and abided by the award.

The Anglo-Venezuelan boundary dispute asserted for the first time a more outward-looking American foreign policy, particularly in the Americas, marking the United States as a world power. That was among the earliest examples of modern interventionism under the Monroe Doctrine in which the USA exercised its claimed prerogatives in the Americas, whilst United Kingdom imperialism in the Americas persisted.

== Aftermath ==
The Olney–Pauncefote Treaty of 1897 was a proposed treaty between the United States and Britain in 1897 that would have required arbitration of major disputes. The treaty was rejected by the US Senate and never went into effect.

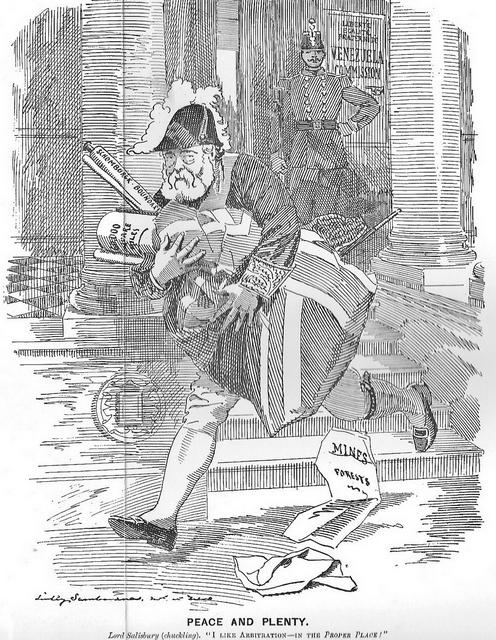
Punch cartoon after the conclusion of the Tribunal of Arbitration. PEACE AND PLENTY. Lord Salisbury (chuckling). "I like arbitration — In the PROPER PLACE!"

The 1895 dispute between the US and Britain over Venezuela was peacefully resolved through arbitration. Both nations realized that a mechanism was desirable to avoid possible future conflicts. US Secretary of State Richard Olney in January 1897 negotiated an arbitration treaty with the British diplomat Julian Pauncefote. President William McKinley supported the treaty, as did most opinion leaders, academics, and leading newspapers. The main opposition came from Irish-Americans, who held a very negative view of Britain because of its treatment of Ireland.

In the US Senate, however, a series of amendments exempted important issues from any sort of arbitration. Any issue that was not exempted would need two-thirds of the Senate before arbitration could begin. Virtually nothing was left of the original proposal, and the Senate in May 1897 voted 43 in favor to 26 opposed, three votes short of what was needed.

Despite its disappointment with the award of Paris Tribunal of Arbitration, Venezuela abided by it. However, half a century later, the publication of an alleged political deal between Russia and Britain led Venezuela to reassert its claims. In 1949, the US jurist Otto Schoenrich gave the Venezuelan government the Memorandum of Severo Mallet-Prevost (Official Secretary of the U.S./Venezuela delegation in the Tribunal of Arbitration), written in 1944 to be published only after Mallet-Prevost's death. That reopened the issues, with Mallet-Prevost surmising a political deal between Russia and Britain from the subsequent private behaviour of the judges.

Mallet-Prevost said that Martens had visited England with the two British arbitrators in the summer of 1899 and had offered the two American judges a choice between accepting a unanimous award along the lines ultimately agreed or a 3–2 majority opinion even more favourable to the British. The alternative would have followed the Schomburgk Line entirely and given the mouth of the Orinoco to the British. Mallet-Prevost said that the American judges and Venezuelan counsel were disgusted at the situation and considered the 3-2 option with a strongly-worded minority opinion but ultimately went along with Martens to avoid depriving Venezuela of valuable territory to which it was entitled.

As a result of Mallet-Prevost's claims, Venezuela revived its claim to the disputed territory in 1962. In 2018, Guyana has applied to the International Court of Justice to get a declaration that the 1899 Award is valid and binding upon Guyana and Venezuela and that the boundary established by that Award and the 1905 Agreement is valid.

== See also ==
- Mallet-Prevost memorandum
- Geneva Agreement
