= James J. Storrow (attorney) =

American attorney (1837–1897)

- Born: July 29, 1837; Boston, Massachusetts, U.S.
- Died: April 15, 1897 (aged 59); Washington, D.C., U.S.
- Occupation: Attorney
- Known for: Represented the Venezuelan government during the crisis of 1895
- Spouses: Annie Maria Perry (m. 1861; death 1865) Anne Amory Dexter (m. 1873)
- Children: 3, including James J. Storrow

James Jackson Storrow (July 29, 1837 – April 15, 1897) was an American patent attorney who represented Venezuela during the crisis of 1895.

== Early life ==
Storrow was born in Boston on July 29, 1837, to Charles Storer Storrow and Lydia Cabot (Jackson) Storrow. He was named after his maternal grandfather, noted physician James Jackson.

== Personal life ==
On August 28, 1861, Storrow married Annie Maria Perry, granddaughter of Commodore Oliver Hazard Perry, in Andover, Massachusetts. They had three children, Elizabeth Randolph Storrow, James J. Storrow, and Samuel Storrow. Annie Storrow died on March 9, 1865. On September 12, 1873, Storrow married Anne Amory Dexter at Boston's Trinity Church in a ceremony performed by Phillips Brooks.

== Legal career ==
Storrow graduated from Harvard College in 1857. He studied law at Harvard Law School and in the office of Elias Merwin and was admitted to the bar in 1860. By 1872, Storrow was dedicating most of his time to patent law cases. Storrow and Benjamin Robbins Curtis represented William Beach Lawrence in his long-running copyright infringement lawsuit against Richard Henry Dana Jr. He was the chief legal advisor for American Bell Telephone and represented the company in The Telephone Cases, a series of court cases in the 1870s and the 1880s related to the invention of the telephone, which culminated in the Supreme Court of the United States upholding the patents belonging to Alexander Graham Bell. In 1875, Storrow represented Sidney Dillon before the U.S. Supreme Court in his suit against the trustees of Boston, Hartford and Erie Railroad. Storrow appeared before the United States Congress to defend patent laws.

In 1896, at the recommendation of his Harvard Law classmate Richard Olney, Storrow was hired as an associate counsel to William Lindsay Scruggs, who was representing Venezuela in its border dispute with British Guiana. Storrow represented Venezuela before the Venezuela Boundary Commission, attended the signing of the Anglo-Venezuelan arbitration treaty, and accompanied minister José Andrade back to Venezuela to present the treaty to President Joaquín Crespo.

Storrow died unexpectedly on April 15, 1897, in the Thomas Jefferson Building.
