= Geneva Agreement (1966) =

Border treaty between Venezuela and UK regarding Guyana

Agreement to resolve the controversy between Venezuela and the United Kingdom of Great Britain and Northern Ireland over the frontier between Venezuela and British Guiana
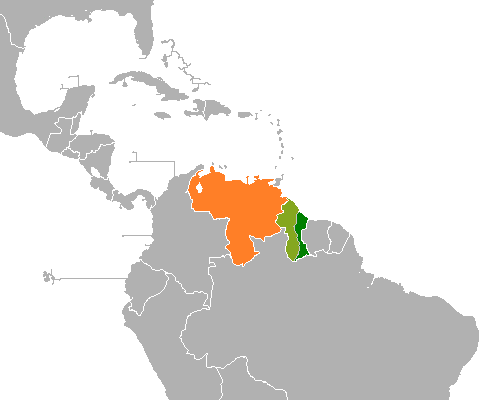
- Territory in dispute (Essequibo) shown in light green with the rest of Guyana in dark green; Venezuela shown in orange.
- Signed: 17 February 1966
- Location: Geneva, Switzerland
- Effective: 17 February 1966
- Signatories: United Kingdom; British Guiana; Venezuela
- Parties: United Kingdom; Guyana (Note: After Guyana received its independence from the United Kingdom, it supplanted the United Kingdom in negotiations on the matter.); Venezuela
- Depositary: Secretary-General of the United Nations
- Languages: Spanish; English

The Agreement to Resolve the Controversy between Venezuela and the United Kingdom of Great Britain and Northern Ireland over the Frontier between Venezuela and British Guiana, better known as the Geneva Agreement, is a treaty between Venezuela and the United Kingdom, along with its colony of British Guiana (which would soon receive its independence), that was signed in Geneva, Switzerland, on 17 February 1966. The treaty outlines the steps taken to resolve the controversy between Venezuela and the United Kingdom, arising from Venezuela's contention to the UN in 1962 that the 1899 declaration by the Paris Tribunal of Arbitration awarding the territory to British Guiana was null and void, following the publication of Mallet-Prevost memorandum and other documents from the tribunal that called the decision into question.

== History ==
The Geneva Agreement was published in the Official Gazette of Venezuela No. 28.008 on April 15, 1966, and subsequently registered with the General Office of the Organization of the United Nations on May 5, 1966, under registration number I-8192.

Three months after the agreement was signed, on May 26, 1966, the colony of British Guiana received its independence from Britain, declaring itself the "Republic of Guyana" (officially the Co‑operative Republic of Guyana since 1970). From that point forward, the new country joined the agreement as an independent nation alongside the United Kingdom and Venezuela, fully taking over the United Kingdom's former position in talks with Venezuela regarding the border controversy.

The Geneva Agreement is a temporary agreement to come to a permanent solution, often referred to as an "agreement to reach an agreement", and although Venezuela maintains that the arbitral award of 1899 is invalid, the status quo under the agreement has endured. As a result, the Essequibo Region will remain under the authority of the government of Guyana until any other resolution is made under the treaty. As per Article V, the treaty cannot be interpreted as a "renunciation or diminution" of any basis of claim to the territorial sovereignty of British Guiana, thus upholding the 1899 Arbitral Award as legally binding. The first article of the document recognizes Venezuela's claim that the 1899 court decision is null and void, but the treaty neither supports nor disputes the claim. Instead, it requires that each of the signing parties acknowledge the other's position, and seek to find a practical, peaceful, and satisfactory solution for all of the parties involved.

The Geneva Agreement established the creation of a "Mixed Commission" composed of representatives of Venezuela and British Guiana (with no direct participation by the United Kingdom), which was given a period of four years to arrive at a final resolution regarding the border controversy, or else choose some other form of peaceful settlement outlined by the UN. In 1970, at the end of this four-year period, the Port of Spain Protocol was signed by Guyana, Venezuela, and the United Kingdom, in order to essentially "freeze" parts of the Geneva Agreement for twelve years. In 1982, Venezuela refused to ratify an extension of the Port of Spain Protocol, bringing the original 1966 agreement back into effect.

In 1983, Venezuela proposed to make direct negotiations with Guyana, but Guyana refused and proposed three alternate routes of reaching an agreement: the United Nations General Assembly, the United Nations Security Council, or the International Court of Justice, each of which was rejected by Venezuela.

Later that same year, at the initiative of Venezuela, and in accordance with the provisions of Article IV-2 of the agreement and Article 33 of the Charter of the United Nations regarding peaceful solutions to conflicts, the border controversy was brought under the jurisdiction of the Secretary-General of the United Nations, since the two countries were not able to reach an agreement on the means of settlement.

In 1987, Guyana and Venezuela decided to accept the Good Offices method, following the General Act for the Pacific Settlement of International Disputes, which would be put into effect in 1989. Following this agreement, a representative of the Secretary General chosen and accepted by the parties would serve as a mediator between the governments so that they reach a satisfactory solution as dictated by the treaty.

The first representative brought in to maintain the Geneva Agreement was former Under-Secretary General Diego Cordovez. The final representative was the Jamaican professor Norman Girvan. Each representative was elected and accepted by both countries with the approval of the Secretary-General of the United Nations.

== Official positions of the countries ==
The positions of the parties arise from different interpretations of the first article of the agreement:

A Mixed Commission shall be established with the task of seeking satisfactory solutions for the practical settlement of the controversy between Venezuela and the United Kingdom which has arisen as the result of the Venezuelan contention that the Arbitral Award of 1899 about the frontier between British Guiana and Venezuela is null and void.

To Guyana, the purpose of the agreement is to initially determine whether the declaration of the Paris Tribunal of Arbitration is null and void, and that unless Venezuela can prove its invalidity, the arbitral award of the region to Guyana is upheld.

To Venezuela, the purpose of the agreement is to commit both parties to reaching a satisfactory solution for a practical agreement between the two countries. It considers the invalidity of the 1899 arbitral award to have been explicitly stated within the document, and implicitly agreed upon through the signature of the Prime Minister of Guyana when it was still a British colony. To Venezuela, this has already been agreed upon, and it would not have been sensible for the other countries to sign the agreement if they did not agree with the statements within.

On the 52nd anniversary of the international treaty being signed in Switzerland, Venezuelan Government has reaffirmed its commitment to the Geneva Agreement. President Nicolas Maduro has called on the Venezuelan people to defend their "legitimate and non-renounceable" territorial rights over the Essequibo region. Defense Minister Vladamir Padrino Lopez stresses that Venezuelans should continue to claim their territory and stated on his social media "The Sun of Venezuela is born in the Essequibo."

== Criticism ==
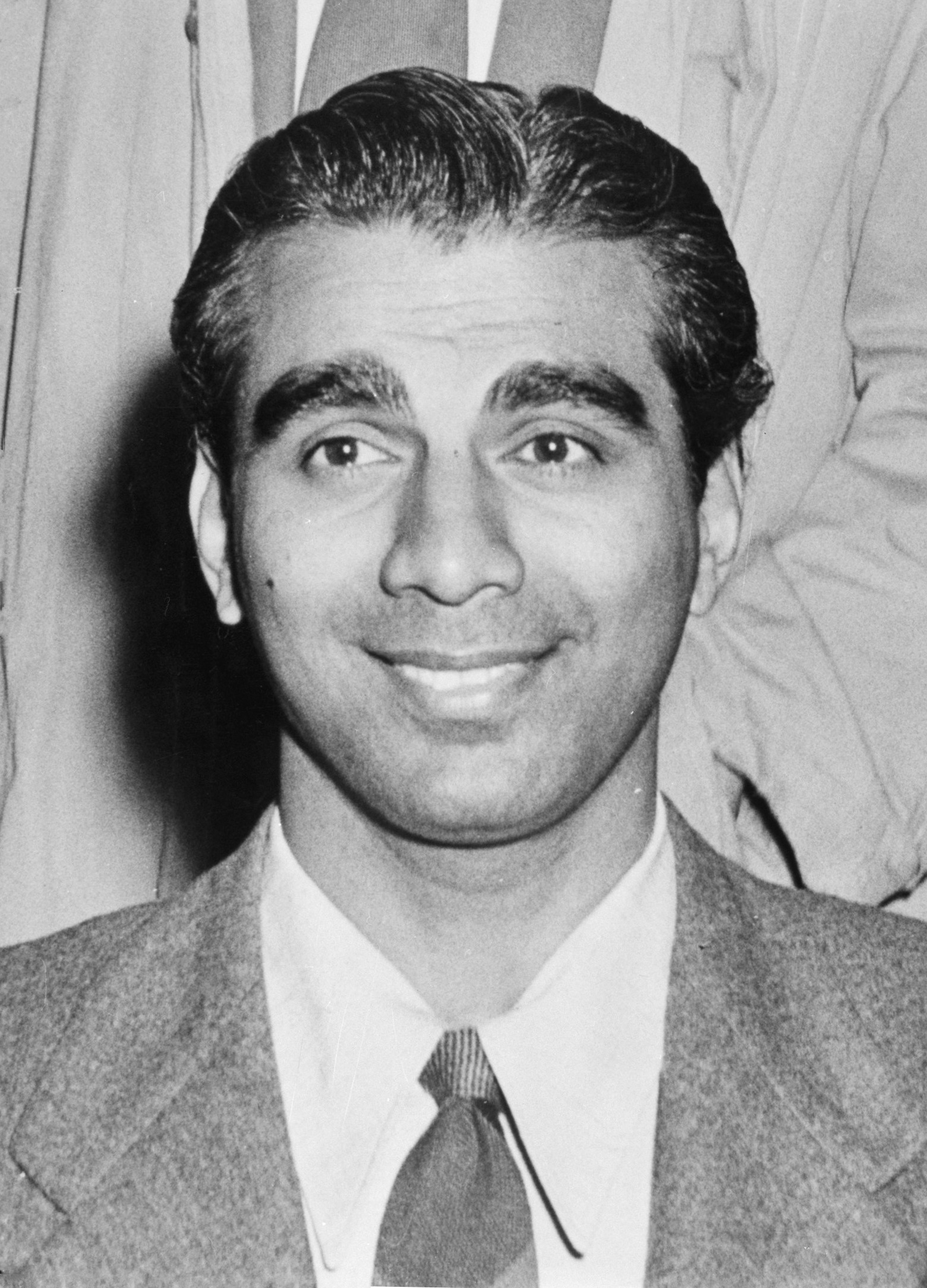
Cheddi Jagan, the Premier of British Guiana from 1961 to 1964. He later served as President of Guyana from 1992 to his death in 1997.

The agreement was criticized in Guyana for essentially reopening a legal case that, for them, was already closed. Notably, Guyanese politician Cheddi Jagan, the chief of the Guyanese opposition, founder of the People's Progressive Party (PPP), and eventual president of the republic, strongly opposed the agreement. In his work The West on Trial (1996), he stated his regrets about the return of the border controversy:

The PNC-UF coalition government jointly signed the Geneva Agreement with the Venezuelan and British governments… and created a Mixed Commission (Guyana-Venezuela). Thus, they conceded recognition to the spurious Venezuelan territorial claims and what had been a closed case since 1899 was reopened.

Although the Geneva Agreement is currently the most valuable document for Venezuela in the negotiation process with Guyana, Venezuela recognizes that it lacks some of the concrete elements required to allow them to recover any territory from Guyana because of the conflicts between Venezuela's stance and the contents and results of the treaty.

In terms of the results of the treaty, there are several effects that harm Venezuela's position:

- The agreement to find a "practical agreement" for a "satisfactory solution" has been proven to be infeasible in practice,
- The United Kingdom was permitted to handle the territory dispute through a colony it had control over instead of interacting with Venezuela directly,
- Venezuela agreed to allowing the colony to become independent from the United Kingdom without requiring a solution to the border problem first,
- Guyana was allowed to become a state, which led to it carrying more weight in the conflict,
- Venezuela would have to negotiate with a country that had inherited the problem from its colonizers, rather than with the country that had created the problem itself, and
- The relative perceptions of the two countries had switched: Venezuela would no longer be perceived as the weak nation usurped by the colonial power of the United Kingdom. Instead, now the poor and newly independent Guyana would appear to be the weak nation being preyed on by a rich country trying to take away part of "its territory".

These results are problematic to Venezuela because it is obviously unlikely that Guyana will choose to give Venezuela three-quarters of the territory it has controlled and administered since the time of its independence, along with its ability to use resources there, regardless of its right to sovereignty over the region. In addition, when British Guiana declared itself an independent nation three months after the Geneva Agreement, Venezuela had to immediately recognize its independence as a result of the agreement, without solving the dispute with the United Kingdom first, and in spite of its continued claims to sovereignty over the Essequibo.

== See also ==
- Guayana Esequiba, territory administered by Guyana which is claimed by Venezuela
- Venezuelan crisis of 1895
