= Otto Schoenrich =

American lawyer (1876–1977)

Otto Schoenrich (July 9, 1876 – February 9, 1977) was an American lawyer who held several international legal positions and practiced at the firm Curtis, Mallet‐Prevost, and Colt & Mosley.

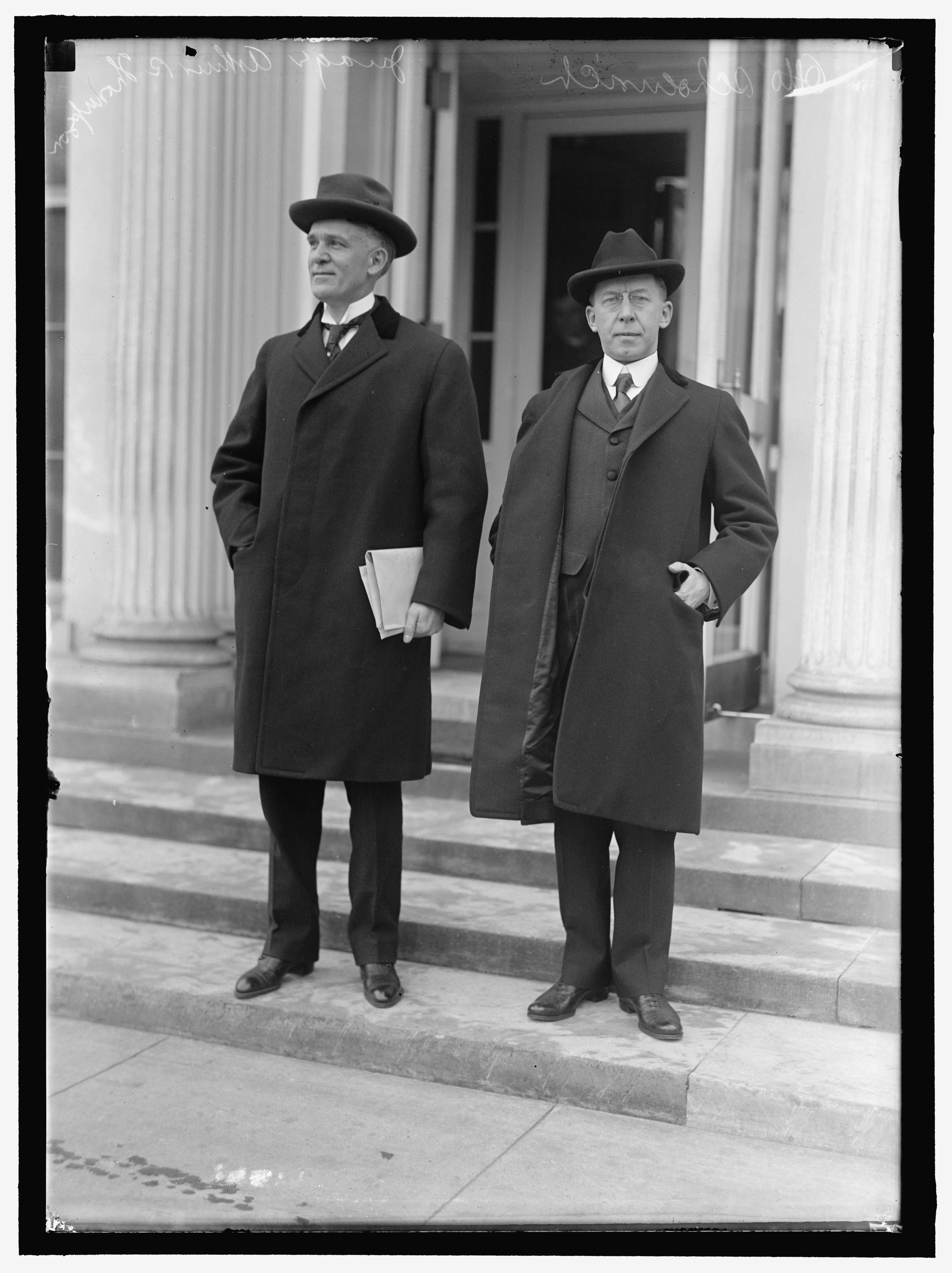

== Biography ==
=== Family and education ===
Otto Schoenrich was born on July 9, 1876, in Baltimore, Maryland. He was the eldest son of Lena A. née Sieck (1853–1940) and German-born language teacher Carl Otto Schoenrich (1847–1932).

In 1894, he graduated with honors from Baltimore City College and studied law at the University of Maryland School of Law, where he obtained a Bachelor of Laws degree in 1897. He later continued his studies at the University of Havana, where he received his doctorate, magna cum laude, as a Doctor of Laws in 1922.

Schoenrich married María Janer Arias (1878–1939) on June 10, 1902. They had two children: Mercedes Schoenrich Janer (1903–1995) and Carlos Otto Schoenrich Janer (1912–2003).

Schoenrich died in February 1977 in Towson. He was buried in Hartsdale, New York.

=== Career ===
Schoenrich practiced in Maryland and New Mexico after graduating from law school. In 1900, he moved to San Juan, Puerto Rico, as an assistant to the Commission to Revise and Compile Laws of Puerto Rico. He became District Judge of the Puerto Rican port city of Arecibo in 1901. In 1904, he was appointed Municipal Judge in the port city of Mayagüez and served as a representative of the United States Commissioner to investigate the financial condition of Santo Domingo. In 1906, he served as Secretary of the Minister of Finance of the Dominican Republic and joined the government of American-occupied Cuba. He was appointed to the Advisory Law Commission, selected to design the new Cuban legal code. In 1909, Schoenrich returned to Puerto Rico, where he assumed the office of District Judge of Mayagüez. In 1911, he became president of the Managua-based Nicaraguan Mixed Claims Commission. After working for one year as a district judge in Humacao, Puerto Rico, he moved to New York City in 1916, where he joined the law firm Curtis, Mallet-Prevost, Colt & Mosle as a partner. Schoenrich acted as an intermediary between the American and Greek governments in 1929 and 1934.

=== Memberships ===
Schoenrich was a staunch supporter of the Republican Party and held memberships in the American Society of International Law, the American Academy of Political and Social Science, the American Foreign Law Association, the Peruvian American Association, and the Pan American Society of the United States.

=== Honors ===
- Order of the Southern Cross
- National Order of Honor and Merit, the highest order of the state of Haiti
- Honorary Professor of Law, Universidad Autónoma de Santo Domingo
- Honorary Doctorate in Social Sciences and Public Law, University of Havana

== Writings ==
- "Former Senator Burton's trip to South America, 1915", in Publication (Carnegie Endowment for International Peace. Division of Intercourse and Education), no. 9, The Endowment, Washington, DC, 1915
- "The Nicaraguan Mixed Claims Commission", in The American Journal of International Law, Volume 9, Number 4, American Society of International Law, Washington, DC, October 1915, pp. 858–69.
- "Santo Domingo: a country with a future", Macmillan, New York, 1918
- "The legacy of Christopher Columbus: the historic litigations involving his discoveries, his will, his family, and his descendants... resulting from the discovery of America", AH Clark Co., Glendale, California, 1949–50
- "Dr. Antonio Sanchez de Bustamante", The American Journal of International Law, Volume 45, Number 4, American Society of International Law, Washington, DC, October, 1951, pp. 746–49.
- "The Civil Code for the Federal District and Territories of Mexico and the Mexican laws on alien land ownership", Baker, Voorhis, New York, 1950
- "La Comisión Consultiva de Cuba (1906–1909)", Revista cubana de derecho público, La Habana, 1951
- "Severo Mallet-Prevost, 1860–1948: the concluding chapter of the historical notes & biographical sketches of the American branch of the Mallet family", privately printed, New York, 1951
- "El Alcázar de Diego Coloń: páginas de su historia/History of the Palace of Diego Columbus in Ciudad Trujillo, Dominican Republic", Pol Hnos., Ciudad Trujillo, 1958
- "Reminiscences of an itinerant lawyer", printed by JH Furst Co., Baltimore, Maryland, 1967

== Literature ==
- Alberta Chamberlain Lawrence: Who's who Among North American Authors: volume III, Golden Syndicate Publishing Company, Los Angeles, 1927, p. 758.
- Martindale-Hubbell Law Directory, Inc: The Martindale-Hubbell law directory: volume II, Martindale-Hubbell Law Directory, Inc., New York, 1961, p. 3577.
- The American Bar, the Canadian Bar, the International Bar: Volume II, RB Forster & Associates, Minneapolis, Minnesota, 1965, p. 992.
- Who was who in America, volume VII, 1977–1981 with world notables, Marquis Who's Who, Chicago, Illinois, 1981, p. 508.
