= Mallet-Prevost memorandum =

Document alleging collusion in the 1899 Paris Arbitral Award over the Essequibo dispute

The Mallet-Prevost memorandum is a document posthumously published, written by Severo Mallet-Prevost, official secretary of the US–Venezuela delegation during the 1899 Paris Arbitral Award, which alleges that the award, ruled largely in favour of Britain in a territorial dispute with Venezuela, resulted from the pressure by the Tribunal President Friedrich Martens and a political deal between Russia and Britain. Said memorandum led to complaints by Venezuela in the United Nations in 1962, which resulted in the Geneva Agreement, signed with the United Kingdom in 1966.

== Memorandum ==
In 1949, the US jurist Otto Schoenrich gave the Venezuelan government a memorandum, reportedly written by Mallet-Prevost, which was written in 1944 to be published only after his death. Mallet-Prevost surmised from the private behavior of the judges that there had been a political deal between Russia and Britain, and said that the Russian chair of the panel, Friedrich Martens, had visited Britain with the two British arbitrators in the summer of 1899, and subsequently had offered the two American judges a choice between accepting a unanimous award along the lines ultimately agreed, or a 3 to 2 majority opinion even more favourable to the British.

The alternative would have followed the Schomburgk Line entirely, and given the mouth of the Orinoco to the British. Mallet-Prevost said that the American judges and Venezuelan counsel were disgusted at the situation and considered the 3 to 2 option with a strongly worded minority opinion, but ultimately went along with Martens to avoid depriving Venezuela of even more territory.

This memorandum provided further motives for Venezuela's contentions that there had possibly been a political deal between the British judges and the Russian judge at the Arbitral Tribunal, and led to Venezuela's revival of its claim to the disputed territory. The memorandum was published after the death of all participating members of the arbitration tribunal. The claim is not substantiated in the correspondence, writings, or personal papers of Melville Fuller, David Brewer, Richard Henn Collins, Charles Russell or Friedrich Martens, the arbitrators tasked with issuing the 1899 Paris Arbitral Award.

== See also ==
- Guyana–Venezuela territorial dispute
- Paris Arbitral Award
