= William Lindsay Scruggs =

American author, lawyer, and diplomat (1836–1912)

United States Ambassador to Colombia
- In office July 24, 1873 – October 26, 1876
- President: Ulysses S. Grant
- Preceded by: Stephen A. Hurlbut
- Succeeded by: Ernest Dichman
- In office July 19, 1882 – December 15, 1885
- President: Chester A. Arthur
- Preceded by: George Earl Maney
- Succeeded by: Charles Donald Jacob

United States Ambassador to Venezuela
- In office May 30, 1889 – December 15, 1892
- President: Grover Cleveland
- Preceded by: Charles L. Scott
- Succeeded by: Frank C. Partridge

Personal details
- Born: September 14, 1836 Nashville, Tennessee, U.S.
- Died: July 18, 1912 (aged 75) Atlanta, Georgia, U.S.
- Resting place: Westview Cemetery
- Occupation: Diplomat
- Profession: Journalist, author, lawyer

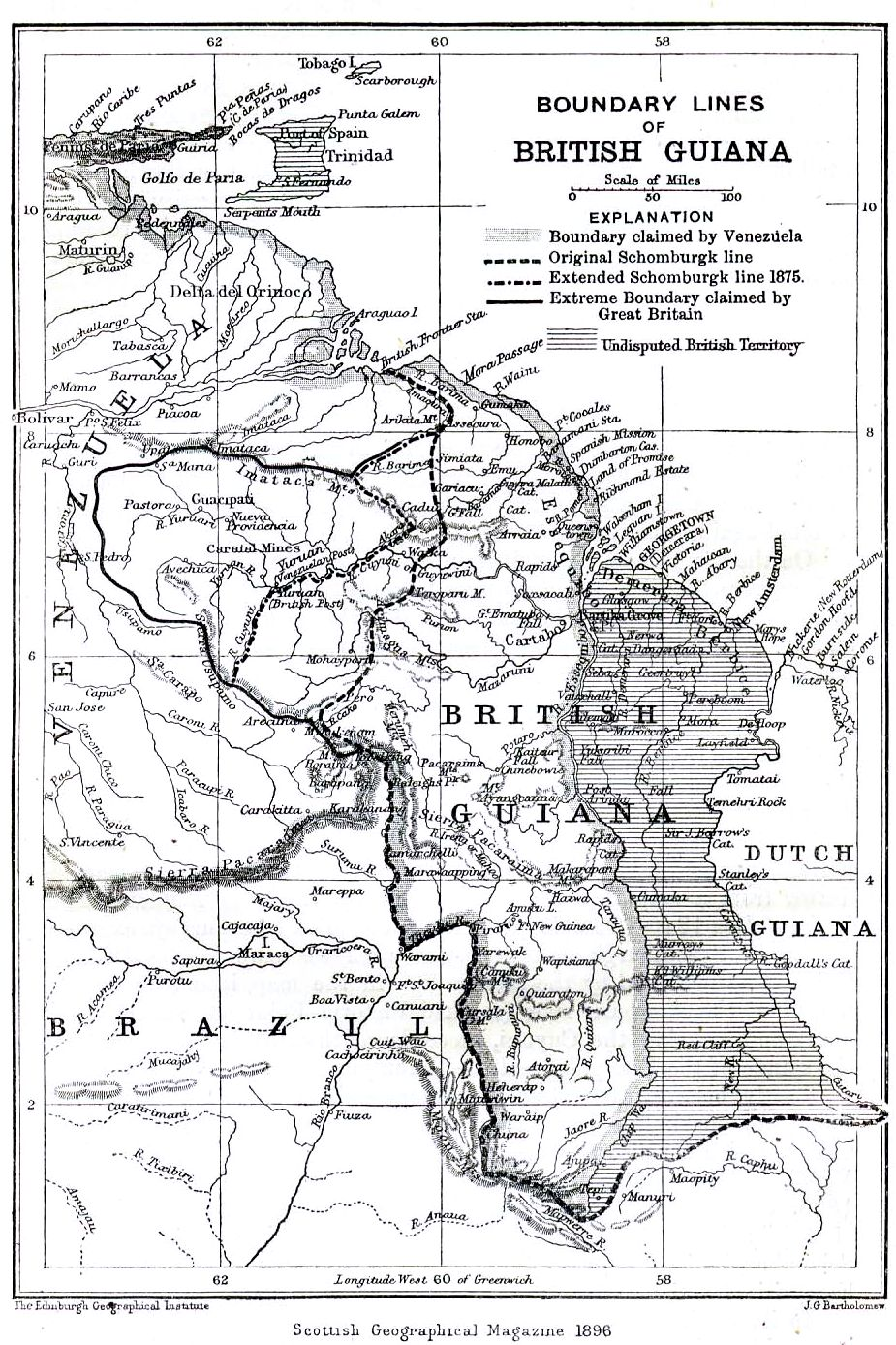
Map of the British aspirations on Venezuela in 1896

William Lindsay Scruggs (September 14, 1836 – July 18, 1912) was an American author, lawyer, and diplomat. He was a scholar of South American foreign policy and U.S. ambassador to Colombia and Venezuela. He played a key role in the Venezuela Crisis of 1895 and helped shape the modern interpretation of the Monroe Doctrine.

== Early life and ambassadorships ==
William L. Scruggs was born in Nashville in 1836. He was a lawyer and journalist in addition to being a diplomat.

Scruggs was U.S. Minister to Colombia from July 24, 1873, to October 26, 1876, and again from July 19, 1882, to December 15, 1885. In 1884 he became known as Envoy Extraordinary and Minister Plenipotentiary, Colombia. Previously his title was simply Minister Resident, Colombia.

Scruggs was U.S. Minister to Venezuela from May 30, 1889, to December 15, 1892. In 1889 he became known as Envoy Extraordinary and Minister Plenipotentiary, Venezuela. Scruggs appeared to resign his ambassadorship to Venezuela in December 1892, but in fact had been dismissed by the US for bribing the President of Venezuela. The bribery was exposed by lawyer Gilbert Ray Hawes.

== Venezuela lobbyist ==
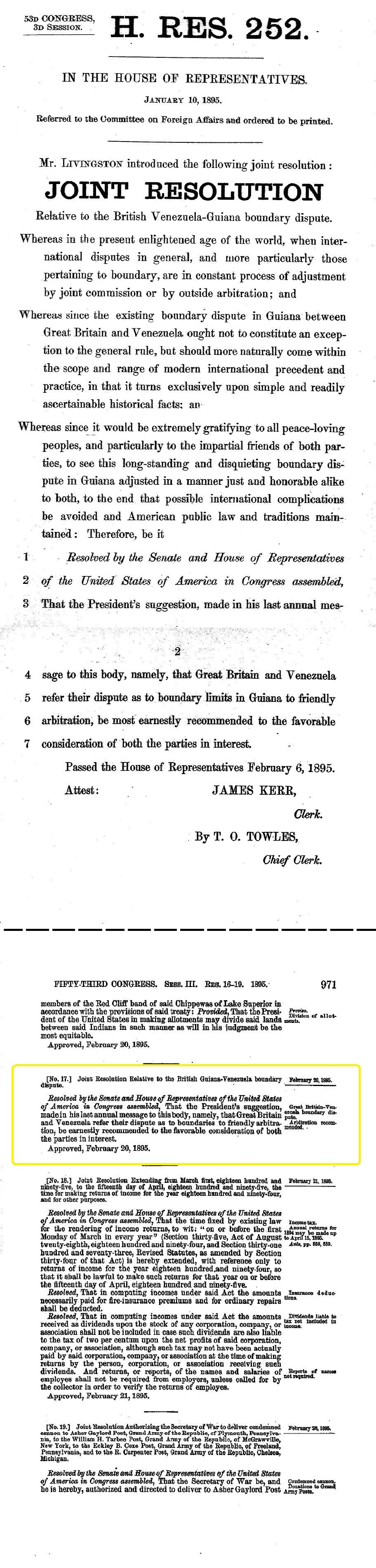
House Resolution 252

In 1893 Scruggs was recruited by the Venezuelan Government to operate on its behalf in Washington, D.C., as a lobbyist and legal attaché. As a lobbyist, Scruggs published the pamphlet entitled British Aggressions in Venezuela: The Monroe Doctrine on Trial. In the pamphlet, he attacked "British aggression" claiming that Venezuela was anxious to arbitrate over the Venezuela/British Guiana border dispute of territory at west of Essequibo River limited by Schomburgk Line. Scruggs also claimed that British policies in the disputed territory violated the Monroe Doctrine of 1823. It was this relationship that eventually led to his service as Special Counsel before the Boundary Commission, three years later.

Scruggs collaborated with Georgian compatriot Congressman Leonidas Livingston to propose House Resolution 252 to the third session of the 53rd Congress of the United States of America. The bill – written by Scruggs – recommended Venezuela and Great Britain settle the dispute by arbitration. President Grover Cleveland signed it into law on February 20, 1895, after passing both houses of the United States Congress. The vote had been unanimous. The president Cleveland adopted a broad interpretation of the Monroe Doctrine that did not just simply forbid new European colonies but declared an American interest in any matter within the hemisphere. British prime minister Lord Salisbury and British ambassador to the US Lord Pauncefote both misjudged the importance the American government placed on the dispute. The key issue in the crisis became Britain's refusal to include the territory east of the Schomburgk Line in the proposed international arbitration.

By December 17, 1895, President Cleveland delivered an address to the United States Congress which was perceived as direct threat of war with Great Britain if the British did not comply with Venezuelan demands (now openly championed by the United States). Almost immediately after Cleveland's statement to the United States Congress, the US military was put on combat alert for a potential war with Great Britain. Ultimately Britain backed down and tacitly accepted the US right to intervene under the Monroe Doctrine. This US intervention forced Britain to accept arbitration of the entire disputed territory.

On December 18, 1895, Congress approved $100,000 for the United States Commission on the Boundary Between Venezuela and British Guiana. It was formally established on January 1, 1896. Jose Andrade, the Venezuelan Minister to Washington, on February 26, 1896, announced that Scruggs had been appointed by the Venezuelan President as his "agent charged with submitting information" to the United States Venezuela Boundary Commission, and to present "reports relative to the titles and rights of Venezuela." An Arbitration Tribunal was agreed between the US and Britain in 1896, and this concluded in 1899 in Paris (France). The Schomburgk Line was re-established as the border between British Guiana and Venezuela, which had been set in 1835. The Anglo-Venezuelan boundary dispute asserted for the first time a more outward-looking American foreign policy that marking the United States as a world power. This is the earliest example of modern interventionism under the Monroe Doctrine in which the USA exercised its claimed prerogatives in the Western Hemisphere.

By standing with a Latin American nation against European colonial powers, Cleveland improved relations with the United States' southern neighbors, but the cordial manner in which the negotiations were conducted also made for good relations with Britain. However, by backing down in the face of a strong US declaration of a strong interpretation of the Monroe Doctrine, Britain tacitly accepted the Doctrine, and the crisis thus provided a basis for the expansion of US interventionism in the [Americas]. Leading British historian Robert Arthur Humphreys later called the boundary crisis "one of the most momentous episodes in the history of Anglo-American relations in general and of Anglo-American rivalries in Latin America in particular."

== Later life ==
Scruggs retired to Atlanta, Georgia, where he died July 18, 1912. He was buried in Westview Cemetery.

== Bibliography ==
- "Restriction of the Suffrage". The North American Review, vol. 139, issue 336 (1884)
- "Blundering American Diplomacy". The North American Review, vol. 145, issue 370 (September 1887)]
- British Aggressions in Venezuela: The Monroe Doctrine on Trial (pamphlet, 1895)
- Fallacies of the British Blue Book on the Venezuela Question (pamphlet, 1896)
- The Guyana Boundary Dispute: Important testimony by an English geographer. The Essequibo River recognized by England as the frontier line between Venezuela and British Guiana as late as 1822 (pamphlet, 1896)
- Lord Salisbury's mistakes (pamphlet, 1896)
- The Venezuelan question: British aggressions in Venezuela, or The Monroe doctrine on trial; Lord Salisbury's mistakes; Fallacies of the British "blue book" on the disputed boundary (book, collected works, 1896)
- Case of Venezuela: Brief concerning the question of boundary between Venezuela and British Guiana (book, 1898)
- The Colombian and Venezuelan Republics, with notes on other parts of Central and South America (book, 1900)
- The Monroe doctrine: Whence it came, what it is, and what it is not (pamphlet 1902)

Diplomatic posts
| Preceded by Stephen A. Hurlbut | United States Minister Resident, Colombia; July 24, 1873 – October 26, 1876 | Succeeded by Ernest Dichman |
| Preceded by George Earl Maney | United States Minister Resident, Colombia; July 19, 1882 – December 04, 1884 | Succeeded by none (change of title) |
| Preceded by none (change of title) | Envoy Extraordinary and Minister Plenipotentiary, Colombia; December 04, 1884 – December 15, 1885 | Succeeded by Charles Donald Jacob |
| Preceded by Charles L. Scott | Envoy Extraordinary and Minister Plenipotentiary, Venezuela; May 30, 1889 – December 15, 1892 | Succeeded by Frank C. Partridge |
