= Schomburgk Line =

Survey line involved in the Guyana–Venezuela territorial dispute

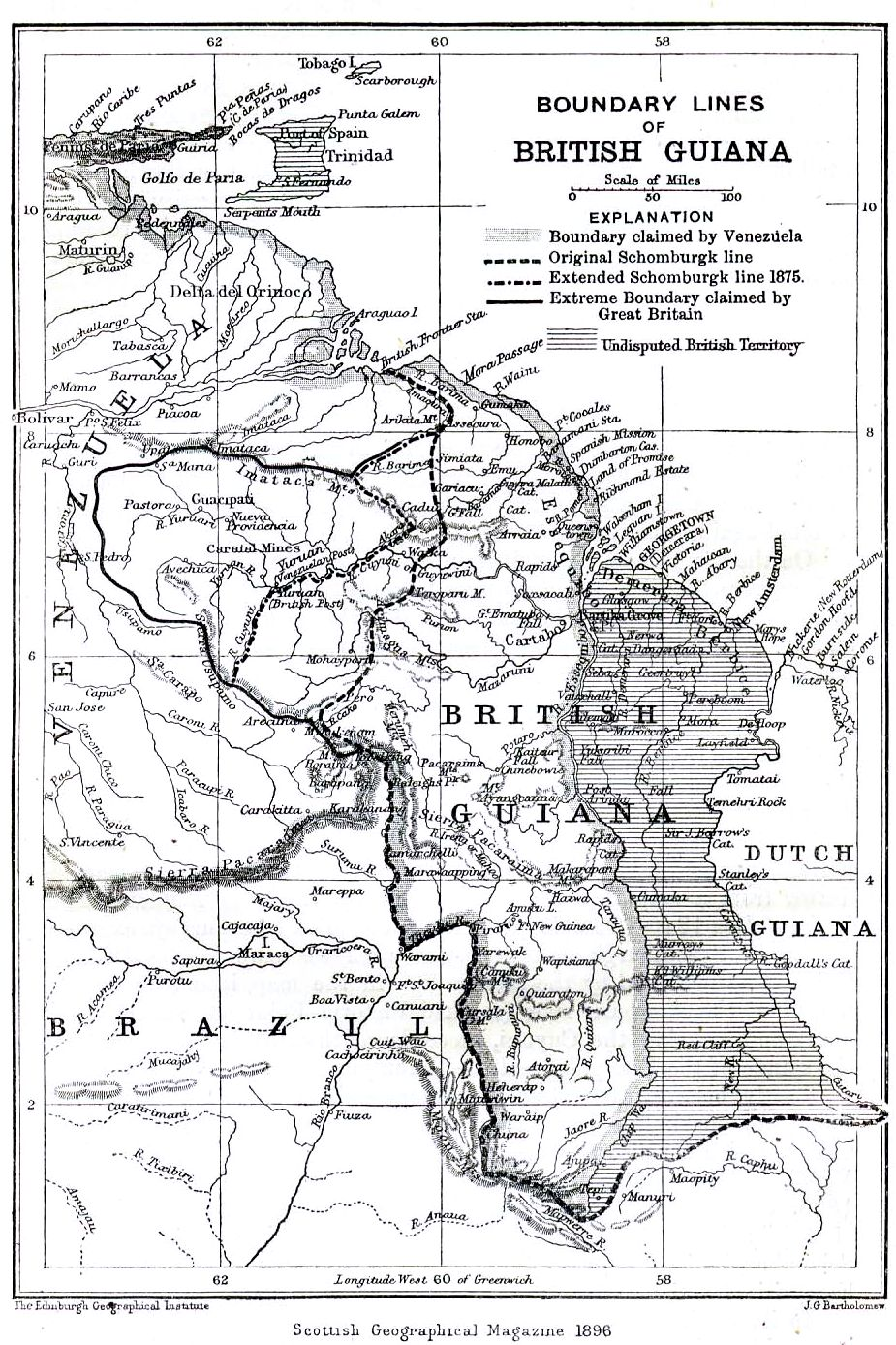
Map showing: * The extreme border claimed by Britain *The current boundary (roughly) and * The extreme border claimed by Venezuela

The Schomburgk Line is the name given to a survey line that figured in a 19th-century territorial dispute between Venezuela and British Guiana. The line was named after German-born English explorer and naturalist Robert Hermann Schomburgk (1804–1865). The dispute arose because when the United Kingdom acquired British Guiana (known as the colonies of Essequibo, Demerara, and Berbice until 1831) from the Netherlands in 1814, the western border with Venezuela was not defined.

== Line ==
In 1835, under the aegis of the Royal Geographical Society, Schomburgk was sent on a trip of botanical and geographical exploration to British Guiana, which resulted in a sketch of the territory with a line marking what he believed to be the western boundary claimed by the Dutch. As a result of this in 1840 he was commissioned by the British Government to carry out a survey of Guiana's boundaries. This survey resulted in what came to be known as the Schomburgk Line. Schomburgk's initial sketch, which had been published in 1840, was the only version of the "Schomburgk Line" published until 1886, which led to later accusations by Grover Cleveland that the line had been extended "in some mysterious way".

The Line went well beyond the area of British occupation, and gave British Guiana control of the mouth of the Orinoco River. Venezuela disputed Schomburgk's survey, claiming that the United Kingdom had illegally acquired an extra 30,000 square miles (80,000 km^{2}) of territory. Venezuela claimed its borders extended as far east as the Essequibo River, citing Pope Alexander VI and his Treaty of Tordesillas which led to the Captaincy General of Venezuela in 1777.

In October 1886 Britain declared the Line to be the provisional frontier of British Guiana, and in February 1887 Venezuela severed diplomatic relations. Venezuela appealed to the United States to intervene, citing the Monroe Doctrine as justification. The United States expressed concern but did little in the way of resolving the situation, until Venezuela's hiring of William L. Scruggs as a lobbyist in Washington, D.C. brought the dispute to a head in the shape of the Venezuelan crisis of 1895. The key issue in the crisis became Britain's refusal to include in the proposed international arbitration the territory east of the Schomburgk Line. The crisis ultimately saw Britain accept the United States' intervention in the dispute to force arbitration of the entire disputed territory, and tacitly accept the United States' right to intervene under the Monroe Doctrine. An international arbitration panel resolved the dispute in 1899.

The Schomburgk Line was, with small deviations, re-established as the border between British Guiana and Venezuela. The first deviation from the Schomburgk line was that Venezuela's territory included Barima Point at the mouth of the Orinoco, giving it undisputed control of the river, and thus the ability to levy duties on Venezuelan commerce. The second was drawing the border at the Wenamu River rather than the Cuyuni River, giving Venezuela a substantial territory east of the line – territory which Britain had originally refused to include in the arbitration. However, Britain received most of the disputed territory, and all of the gold mines.

On a related issue the southern boundary between British Guiana and Brazil was settled after arbitration by the King of Italy in 1904, where Schomburgk's survey also played a role.
