= Barima Point =

Settlement in Antonio Díaz municipality, Venezuela

- Settlement
- Location within Venezuela
- Coordinates: 8°36′26″N 60°24′39″W
- Country: Venezuela
- State: Delta Amacuro
- Municipality: Antonio Díaz
- Time zone: UTC−4 (VET)

Barima Point (Spanish: Punta Barima), is a small settlement in the Antonio Díaz municipality of Delta Amacuro state in Venezuela, at the mouth of the Barima River.

It has a lighthouse, Faro Barima, and a Coast Guard Station.

The city was controlled by British Guiana until 1899, when it was returned to Venezuela in the Paris Arbitral Award.
