= Robert Hermann Schomburgk =

German-born explorer

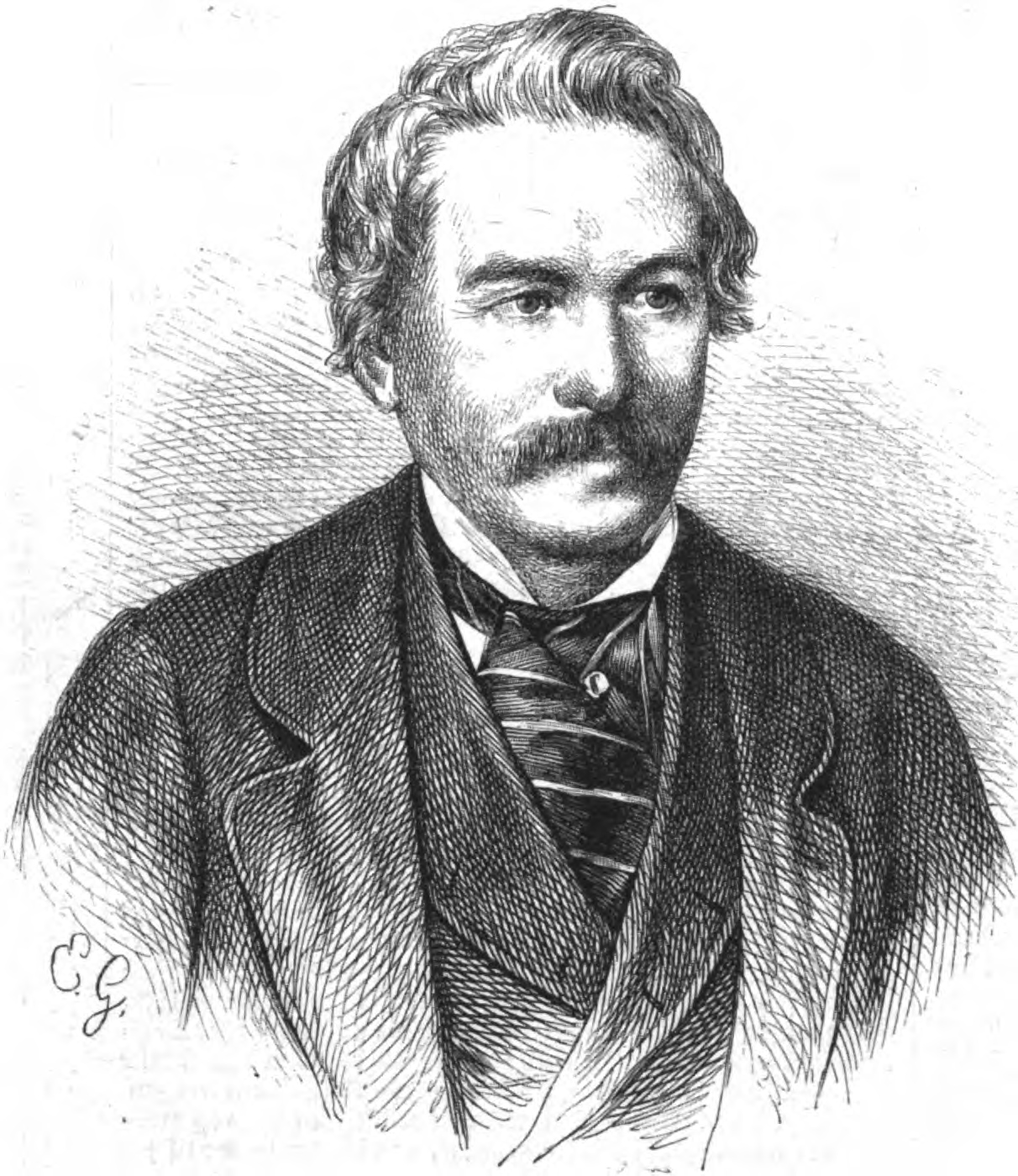
- Born: 5 June 1804; Freyburg
- Died: 11 March 1865; Schöneberg
- Occupations: Diplomat, world traveler, illustrator, merchant, writer, botanical collector, scientific collector, naturalist, politician
- Relatives: Moritz Richard Schomburgk
- Awards: Patron’s Medal (John Wood, For his perseverance and success in exploring the territory and investigating the resources of British Guyana, 2, Eduard Rüppell, 1840)

Sir Robert Hermann Schomburgk (5 June 1804 – 11 March 1865) was a German-born explorer for Great Britain who carried out geographical, ethnological and botanical studies in South America and the West Indies, and also fulfilled diplomatic missions for the United Kingdom in the Dominican Republic and the Rattanakosin Kingdom (now Thailand).

== Life and career ==
Schomburgk was born at Freyburg, Electorate of Saxony, a son of Johann Friedrich Ludwig Schomburgk, a Protestant minister. In 1820, whilst staying with his uncle, he learnt botany from a professor.

=== Commercial career ===
He entered commercial life and, in 1828, went to the United States, where he worked for a time as a clerk in Boston and Philadelphia. In 1828, he was requested to supervise a transport of Saxon sheep to the American state of Virginia, where he lived for a time. In the same year, he became a partner in a tobacco factory at Richmond. The factory was burned down, and Schomburgk was ruined. He suffered further setbacks on the Caribbean island of St. Thomas, where he lost all his belongings in a fire. Consequently, he ceased his business activities.

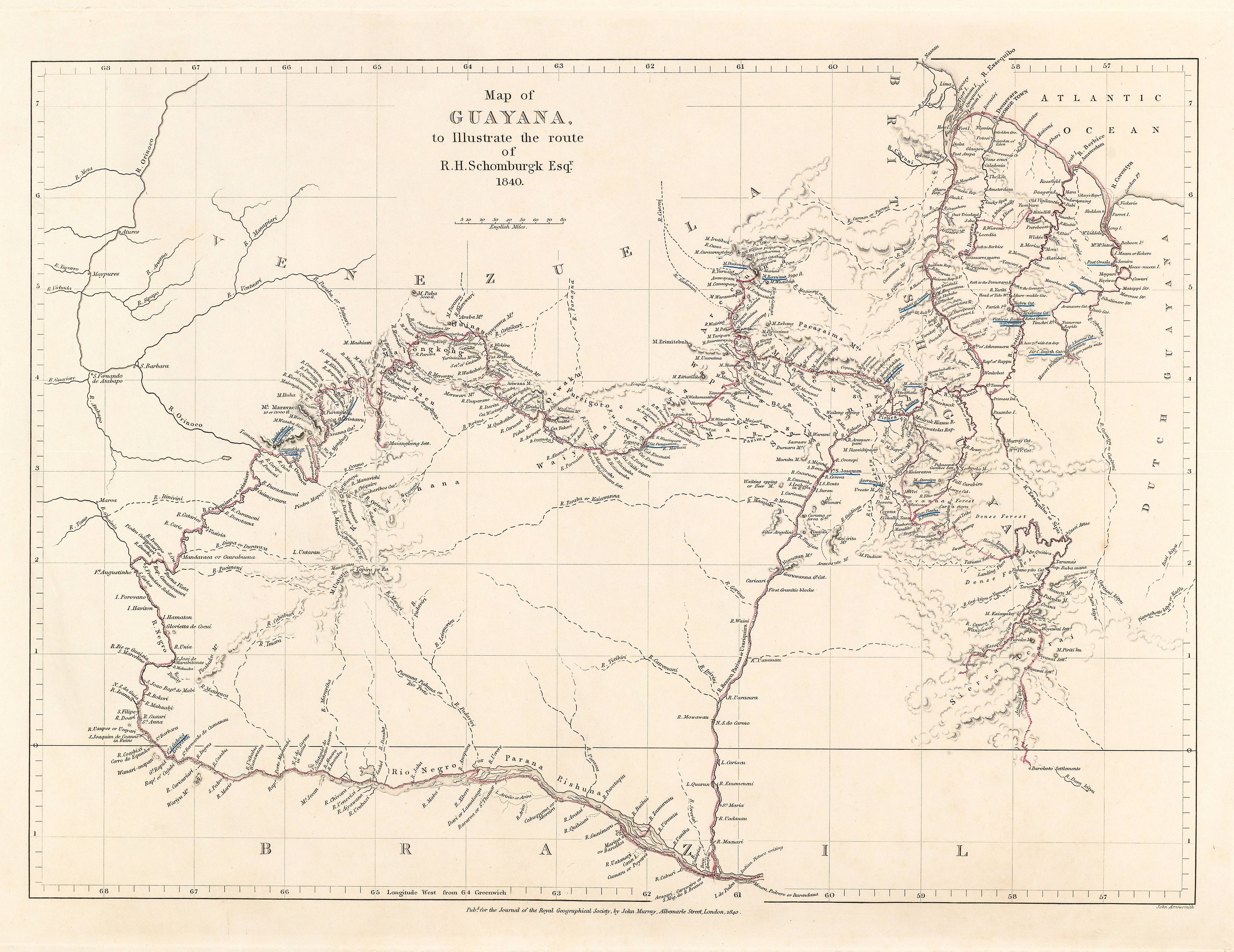
Schomburgk's 1840 map of his route through Guayana

=== Geographic and exploration career ===
In 1830, he left for Anegada, one of the Virgin Isles, notorious for its shipwrecks. Although he did not possess the special knowledge that is required for such work, he surveyed the island at his own expense and sent to the Royal Geographical Society (London) a report which created such an impression that, in 1835, he was entrusted by that body with conducting an expedition of exploration of British Guiana.

He fulfilled his mission (1835–1839) with great success, incidentally discovering the giant Victoria Regia water lily in 1837 and many new species of orchids, one genus of which, Schomburgkia, was named for him. He also laid to rest the persistent myth of Raleigh's Lake Parime by proposing that the seasonal flooding of the Rupununi savannah had been misidentified as a lake. In 1841, he returned to Guiana, this time as a British Government official to survey the colony and fix its eastern and western boundaries. The result was the provisional boundary between British Guiana and Venezuela, known as the "Schomburgk Line", and the boundary with the Dutch colony of Surinam. He also made further geographical and ethnological observations and was joined there by his brother, Moritz Richard. He repeatedly urged fixing the boundary with Brazil, motivated by his encounters with Brazilian enslavement of local Indian tribes, most of which no longer exist. Schomburgk's survey later played a role in the arbitration of the southern boundary between British Guiana and Brazil, with arbitration by the King of Italy in 1904.

On the brothers' return to London in June 1844, Schomburgk presented a report of his journey to the Geographical Society, for which he was knighted by Queen Victoria in 1845, and continued in other official capacities. In 1846, he was stationed in Barbados, where he gathered information to compile a geographical and statistical description of the island, later to be published in 1848 as the History of Barbados and reprinted in 1971 by Frank Cass in the Cass Library of West Indian Studies series.

=== Diplomatic career ===
In 1848, he was appointed British consul to the Dominican Republic. In 1850, he signed an advantageous commercial treaty for Great Britain and also secured a truce from Soulouque on behalf of the Dominican government. During the following years, he contributed valuable papers about the physical geography of the island to the journal of the Royal Geographical Society. For example, he became the first recorded person in history to climb Hispaniola's (and the entire Caribbean's) highest mountain, Pico Duarte, in 1851, naming it "Monte Tina" and almost measuring its height correctly at 3,140 metres (10,300 ft). In 1857, he was promoted to the position of British Consul-General of Siam, where Britain exercised extraterritorial jurisdiction through consular courts over British subjects. In a letter to his cousin William, Schomburgk notes, "In order to get an insight into the English summary police court proceedings, I was, before I left London, obliged to attend police courts there for some time, also to acquaint myself with these proceedings by the study of books". Based in Bangkok, he also continued his geographical surveys. The letter gives a short account of his visit to the semi-independent kingdom of Chiang Mai in 1859–60, and thence by elephant across the mountain range to Moulmein on the Bay of Bengal, returning to Bangkok after a trip of 135 days and approximately 1,000 English miles.

=== Death ===
He retired from the public service in 1864, hampered by health problems, and died in Schöneberg in Berlin on 11 March 1865.

=== Recognition ===
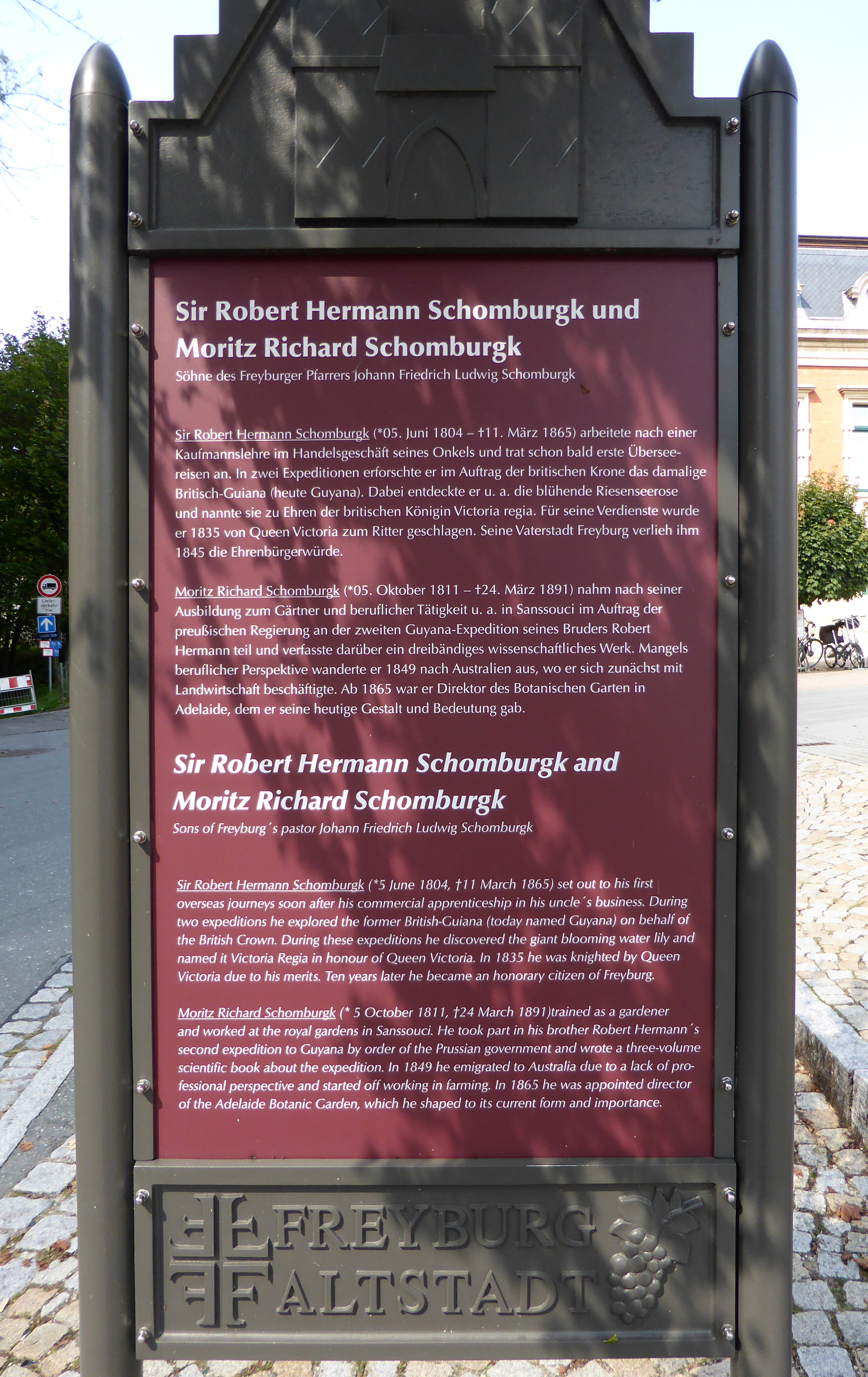
Memorial to the Schomburgk brothers in Freyburg, Germany

Schomburgk was a member of various European, American, and Asiatic learned societies, and was a knight of the Legion of Honour and of the Prussian Order of the Red Eagle.

Schomburgk's deer (Rucervus schomburgki) was named after him.

The South American fishes Mylesinus schomburgkii (Valenciennes, 1850), Polycentrus schomburgkii (Müller & Troschel, 1849) and Myloplus schomburgkii (Jardine, 1841) are named after him.

Many special of Neotropical plants are named for him:

- Harperocallis schomburgkiana (Oliv.) L.M.Campb. & Dorr

His botanical collection is at Kew and his ethnographical collection from Guyana is at the British Museum.

== Works ==
- (1837) Report of the Third Expedition Into the Interior of Guayana; followed by a catalogue of contributions transmitted from British Guiana, to the Paris universal exhibition of 1867
- (1840) Voyage in Guiana and upon the Shores of the Orinoco during the Years 1835–'39, London (translated into German by his brother Otto, under the title Reisen in Guiana und am Orinoco in den Jahren 1835–'39, Leipsig, 1841, with a preface by Alexander von Humboldt)
- (1840) Researches in Guiana, 1837–'39
- (1840) A Description of British Guiana, Geographical and Statistical, London, Simpkin, Marshall & Co, 155 p.
- (1841) The natural history of the fishes of Guiana, Series: Naturalist's library, Ichthyology, vol. 3, Part I (263 p. + pl.) and part II (214 p. + pl.). Edinburgh, H. Lizars
- (1841) Twelve views in the interior of Guiana, London, Ackermann & Co, 38 p.
- (1844) Description of Calycophyllum Stanleyanum: A New Rubiaceæ from Guiana, in London journal of botany
- (1845) Die Barbacenia Alexandrine et Alexandra imperatris (monograph on two plants discovered in British Guiana), Brunswick
- (1845) Rapatea Frederici Augusti und Saxo-Frederici regalis (monograph on two plants discovered in British Guiana)
- (1848) The history of Barbados, London, Longman, Brown, Green and Longmans, 722 p.
- (1848) Memoir and notes in Sir W. Raleigh's The Discovery of the Empire of Guiana
- (1848) Contributions to the commercial statistics of the republics in South America, London, Monds & Co.
- (1849) R. H. Schomburgk and Adalbert, Travels of His Royal Highness Prince Adalbert of Prussia, in the South of Europe and in Brazil: With a Voyage Up the Amazon and the Xingú, vol. 1 (338 p.) and vol. 2 (377 p.), ISBN 1357368550, 9781357368555
- Peter Rivière (ed.), The Guiana Travels of Robert Schomburgk 1835–1844, 2 vols (Aldershot: Ashgate for the Hakluyt Society, 2006).
