= Curtis, Mallet-Prevost, Colt & Mosle =

International law firm

Curtis, Mallet-Prevost, Colt & Mosle LLP
- Headquarters: 101 Park Avenue; New York City, United States
- No. of offices: 19
- No. of attorneys: 250 (December 2018)
- Major practice areas: General practice
- Date founded: 1830 (New York City)
- Company type: LLP
- Website: www.curtis.com

Curtis, Mallet-Prevost, Colt & Mosle LLP, (known as Curtis), is a New York-headquartered international law firm with 250 attorneys in 19 offices worldwide. Founded in 1830, it is renowned for its representation of sovereign states in international transactions and disputes.

== History ==
The law firm was founded in 1830 in New York City by Connecticut natives and brothers, John L. and James L. Graham, who established their legal practice at 143 Fulton Street, Manhattan, today's Financial District. The Graham and Curtis families had a history of intermarriage in Connecticut and, in 1838, the firm admitted partner William Curtis Noyes, the son of a state Supreme Court justice. The firm merged in 1852 with another legal partnership established by a member of the Curtis family and moved to new premises on Wall Street. In 1899, Severo Mallet-Prevost joined the firm. In 1925, the firm's current name was adopted, Curtis, Mallet-Prevost, Colt & Mosle. The firm established its Washington, D.C. office in 1963, followed by an office in Paris in the 1970s, and has continued to expand globally, to 19 international offices. The firm presently maintains its headquarters in the H. J. Kalikow and Co., Inc. building at 101 Park Avenue in Midtown Manhattan.

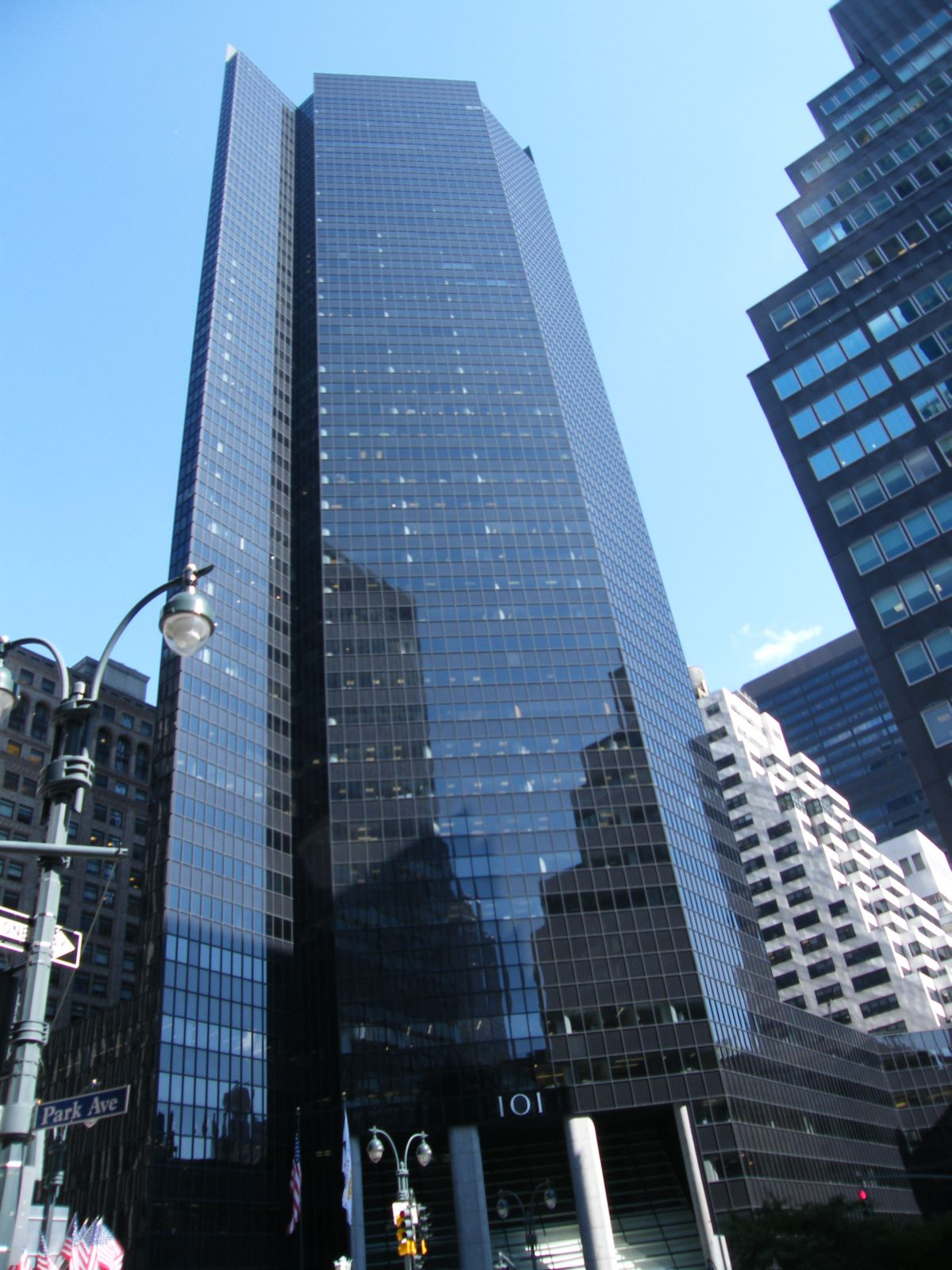
The firm's New York offices at 101 Park Avenue in Manhattan

== Performance ==
In February 2009, despite a weak economy, the firm reported a 13.5% surge in revenue, pushing profits per partner to the $1 million mark, a record for the firm. Revenues per lawyer were reported at $570,000. Chairman George Kahale cited the firm's limited presence in mergers and acquisitions, banking, and private equity, along with its strength in bankruptcy and arbitration as major contributors to the firm's stability and growth.

In 2012, the firm reported continued revenue growth of nearly 18%, reaching $165 million for the year. The firm also saw its attorney presence expand, eclipsing 300 attorneys total for the first time.

== Noted practices ==
The firm’s practice areas include international arbitration, securities, mergers and acquisitions, project finance, energy, bankruptcy, public international law and international trade.

Curtis, Mallet-Prevost has long had a strong focus on Latin America. Currently the firm maintains an office in Mexico City and has a strategic alliance with the Argentine law firm, Fernandez Quiroga Ayarragaray & Ocampo. Legal publications report that the firm's strategic alliance is the first step towards a full-fledged merger of the two firms. Curtis is also seeking to expand into Brazil.

== Major clients ==
Curtis has represented a significant number of sovereign states and state-entities.

It represented now-defunct securities firm Drexel Burnham Lambert in charges under the RICO Act and the Securities Act by the United States government. Key clients include Verizon and Flextronics in the telecommunications sector, Access Industries and the Century Aluminum Company (a subsidiary of Glencore International AG), in the industrial sector, and Citgo, PDVSA, YPFB and KazMunayGas, in the petrochemical sector. The firm also represented state-owned or parastatal energy companies. Curtis also represented the Air Transportation Stabilization Board in a number of transactions regarding air carrier consolidation and restructuring following the September 11 attacks. The firm was retained by bankrupt investment bank Lehman Brothers to serve as conflicts counsel in its Chapter 11 proceedings when its lead counsel, Weil, Gotshal & Manges, cannot act due to conflicts of interest. Noted clients also include Mexican state oil company Pemex and Venezuelan PDVSA.

== Pro bono ==
Among the firm's pro bono publico endeavors was the representations of Stanley Williams in a death penalty appeal in the state of California. In 2007, the firm also represented the not-for-profit Katonah Village Improvement Society, in its opposition to Martha Stewart Living Omnimedia's attempt to register the name "Katonah" as a trademark. In 2008, Curtis partner Jeffrey I. Zuckerman represented Mordechai Dov Brody and his parents in opposing an effort by Children's Hospital in Washington, D.C., to terminate Brody's life support. Also in 2008, Curtis partner Santiago Corcuera was mentioned and quoted by the Latin Lawyer Magazine for his pro bono work in Mexico. Curtis was also ranked sixth, out of fifteen firms in the Pro Bono Ranking conducted by the Latin Lawyer Magazine in 2008.

== Recognition and awards ==
Curtis is an AmLaw 200 firm. The American Lawyer listed Curtis as fifth in 2016, and 10th in 2017, among U.S. law firms for diversity.

Curtis is recognized "for its dispute resolution work in Oman and Africa, corporate and commercial work in the UAE, M&A in Italy," and "international arbitration in the USA", according to its Chambers Associates law student guide listing.

== See also ==
- Mallet-Prevost memorandum
