= Merume River =

Coordinates: 5°53′N 59°53′W

- Location within Guyana

Location
- Country: Guyana
- Region: Cuyuni-Mazaruni

Physical characteristics
- Mouth: Kamarang River

The Merume River is a river of Guyana, a tributary of the Mazaruni River.

Merume is also the name of a nearby mountain, which is 30 miles east of Mount Roraima. Director Creek is a tributary of Merume River. First Falls is a feature of the river which also limits travel by boat.

Merumite was discovered in 1937 appearing as black grains among diamonds and gold in the river gravel. In 1958, merumite was determined to be a complex aggregate of eskolaite and chromium, X-ray diffraction data showed it contained eskolaite, guyanaite, bracewellite, grimaldiite, and mcconnellite.

Kamakusa was a settlement along the river, and formerly a government center.

== See also ==
- List of rivers of Guyana

== Bibliography ==
- Rand McNally, The New International Atlas, 1993.
