= Guyana Airways =

National airline of Guyana

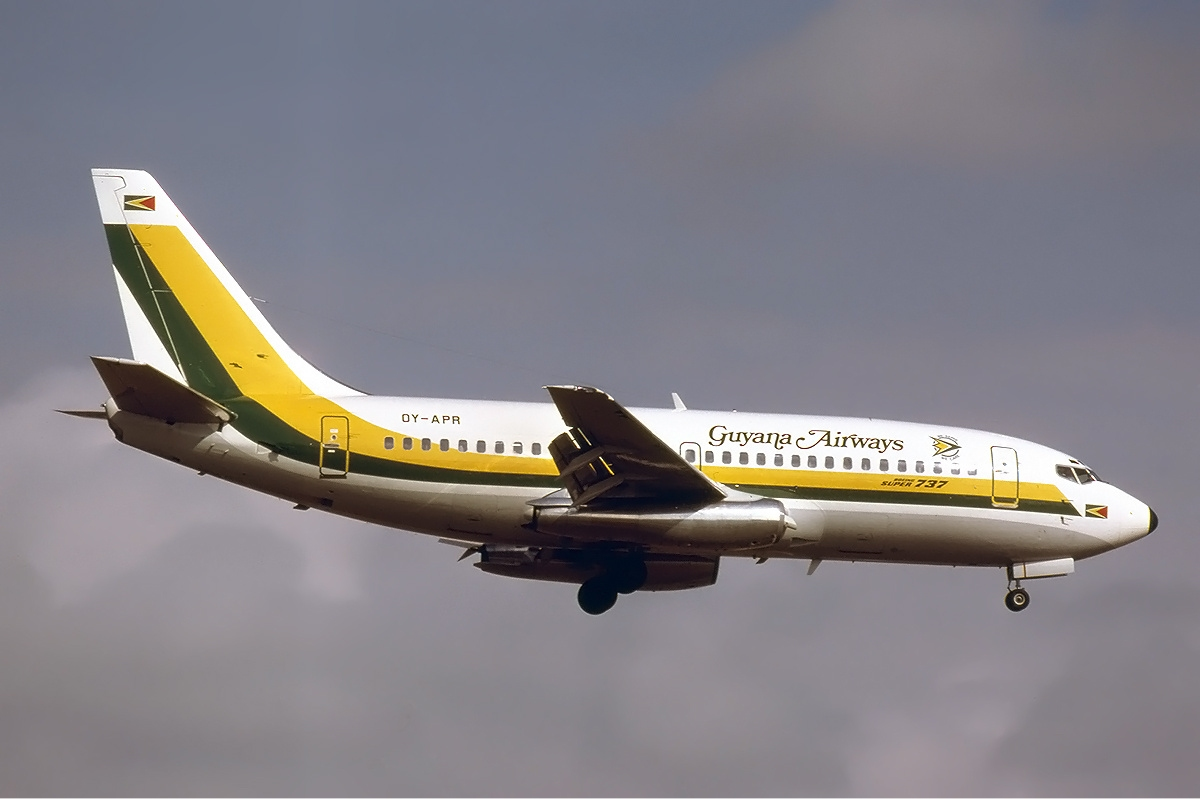
- Guyana Airways Boeing 737-200
IATA	ICAO	Call sign
GY	GYA	GUYAIR
- Founded: 1939 as (British Guiana Airways)
- Ceased operations: May 2001
- Hubs: Cheddi Jagan International Airport
- Fleet size: 2
- Destinations: 16 (at the time of closure)
- Headquarters: Georgetown, Guyana
- Founders: Art J. Williams; Harry Wendt

Guyana Airways was the flag carrier of Guyana. During its operations, Guyana Airways operated services to destinations in the Caribbean, the United States and Canada. The airline was headquartered in Georgetown, Guyana. It was declared insolvent in 2001.

== History ==
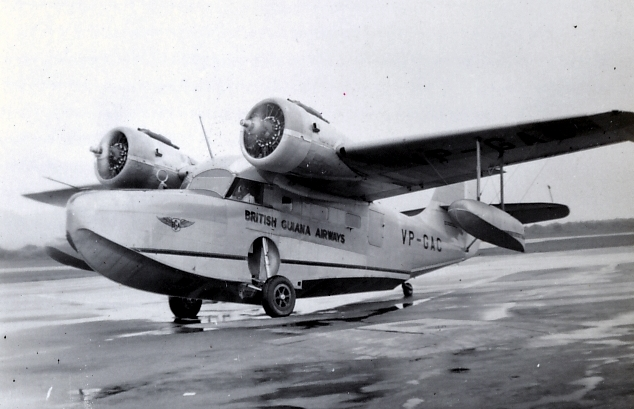
A Grumman G-21 Goose of British Guiana Airways circa 1955, at Piarco International Airport

The company was founded by Art J. Williams and Harry Wendt in 1939 as British Guiana Airways using Ireland flying boats. Although it was a private venture, the colonial government provided subsidies. In the 1940s, the company began operating with the Grumman G-21 Goose. In July 1955, the colonial government bought BGA. At this time, BWIA West Indies Airways provided management assistance. In September 1963, the name was shortened to Guyana Airways. In May 1966, Guyana became an independent nation. The airline leased all of its aircraft, which resulted in many different aircraft types being flown during the airline's existence, such as Russian-made Tupolev and American Boeing jets.

In June 1999, the airline went bankrupt and ceased operations. However, a new company named Guyana Air 2000 was formed using its assets, and maintained a short-lived operation until May 2001 when it filed for insolvency.

== Destinations ==
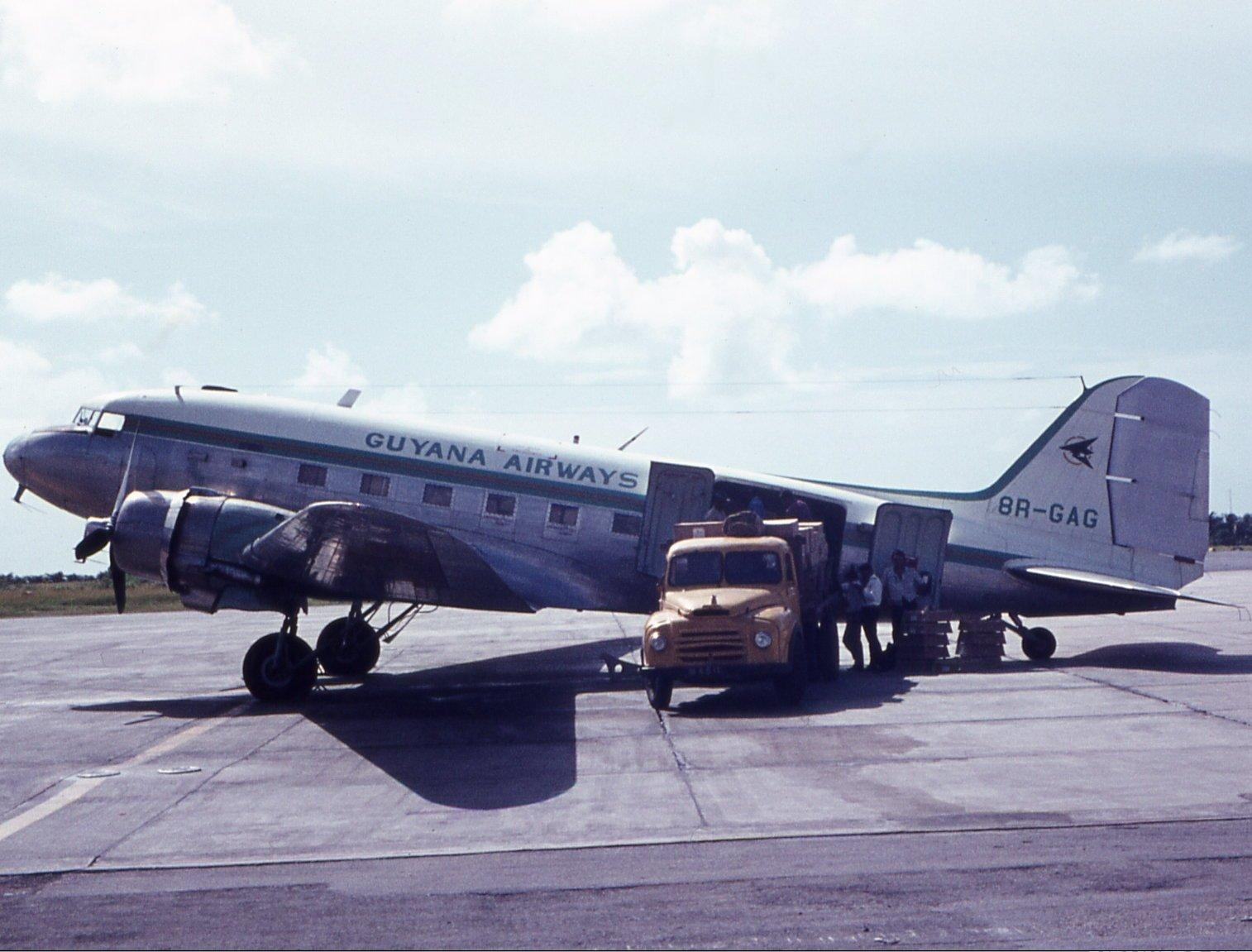
A Douglas DC-3 of Guyana Airways at Grantley Adams International Airport in 1969

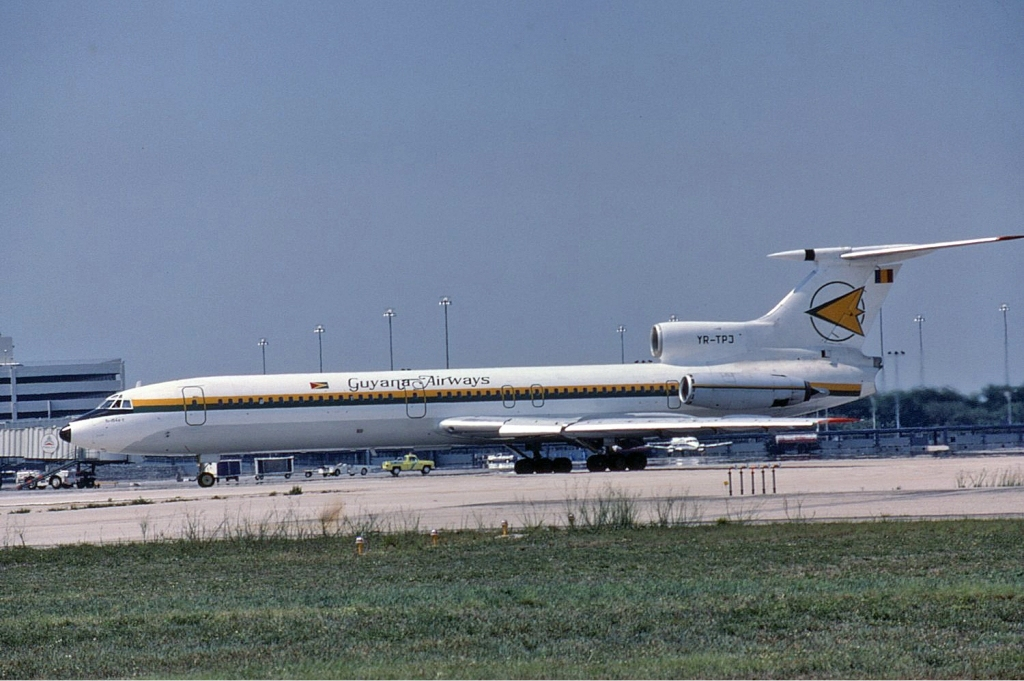
A Guyana Airways Tupolev Tu-154B taxiing at Henri Coandă International Airport in 1985

=== International routes in 1981 ===
According to the April 26, 1981 Guyana Airways international service timetable, the airline was operating Boeing 737-200 jet flights between Georgetown Timehri Airport (GEO, now Cheddi Jagan International Airport) and the following international destinations:

- Bridgetown, Barbados (BGI)
- Miami (MIA)
- Paramaribo (PBM)
- Port of Spain (POS)

=== International routes in 1983 ===
According to the July 1, 1983 edition of the Official Airline Guide (OAG), Guyana Airways was serving the following international and domestic destinations from Georgetown (GEO):

International destinations served with the Boeing 707:

- Bridgetown, Barbados (BGI)
- Miami (MIA)
- New York City (JFK)
- Paramaribo (PBM)
- Port of Spain (POS)
- Boa Vista (BVB)

Domestic destinations in Guyana served with de Havilland DHC-6 Twin Otter and Hawker Siddeley HS 748 turboprops:

- Annai (NAI)
- Bartica (GFO)
- Bemichi (BCG)
- Ekereku (EKE)
- Imbaimadai (IMB)
- Kamarang (KAR)
- Kurupung (KPG)
- Lethem (LTM)
- Mabaruma (USI)
- Mahdia (MHA)
- Matthews Ridge (MWJ)

== Fleet ==
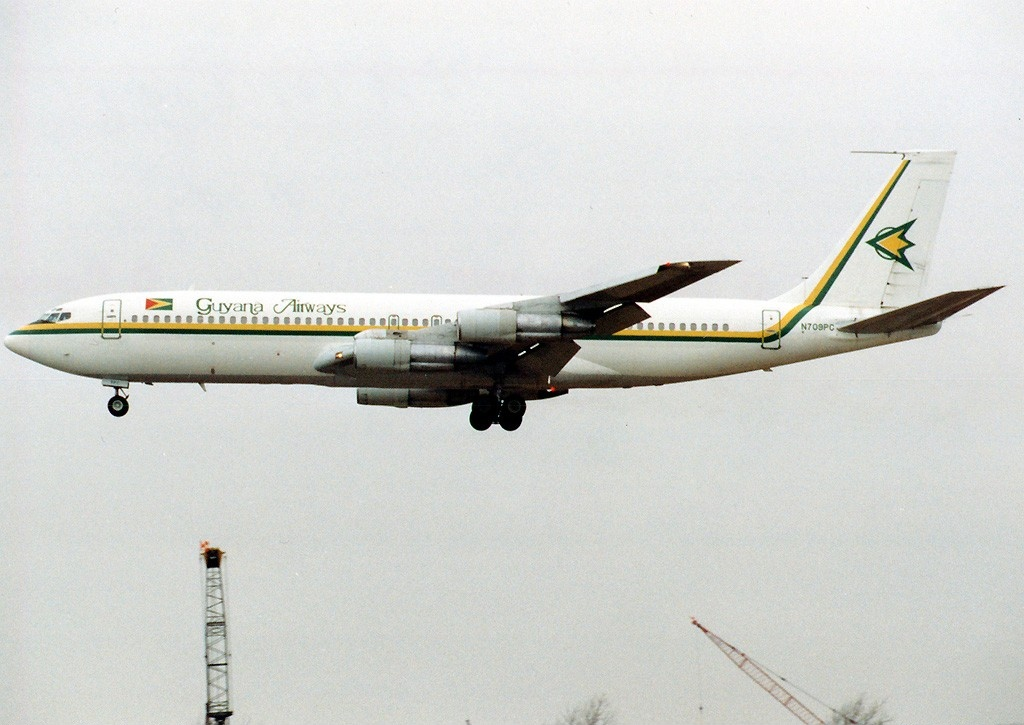
A Guyana Airways Boeing 707-320B landing at John F. Kennedy International Airport in 1992

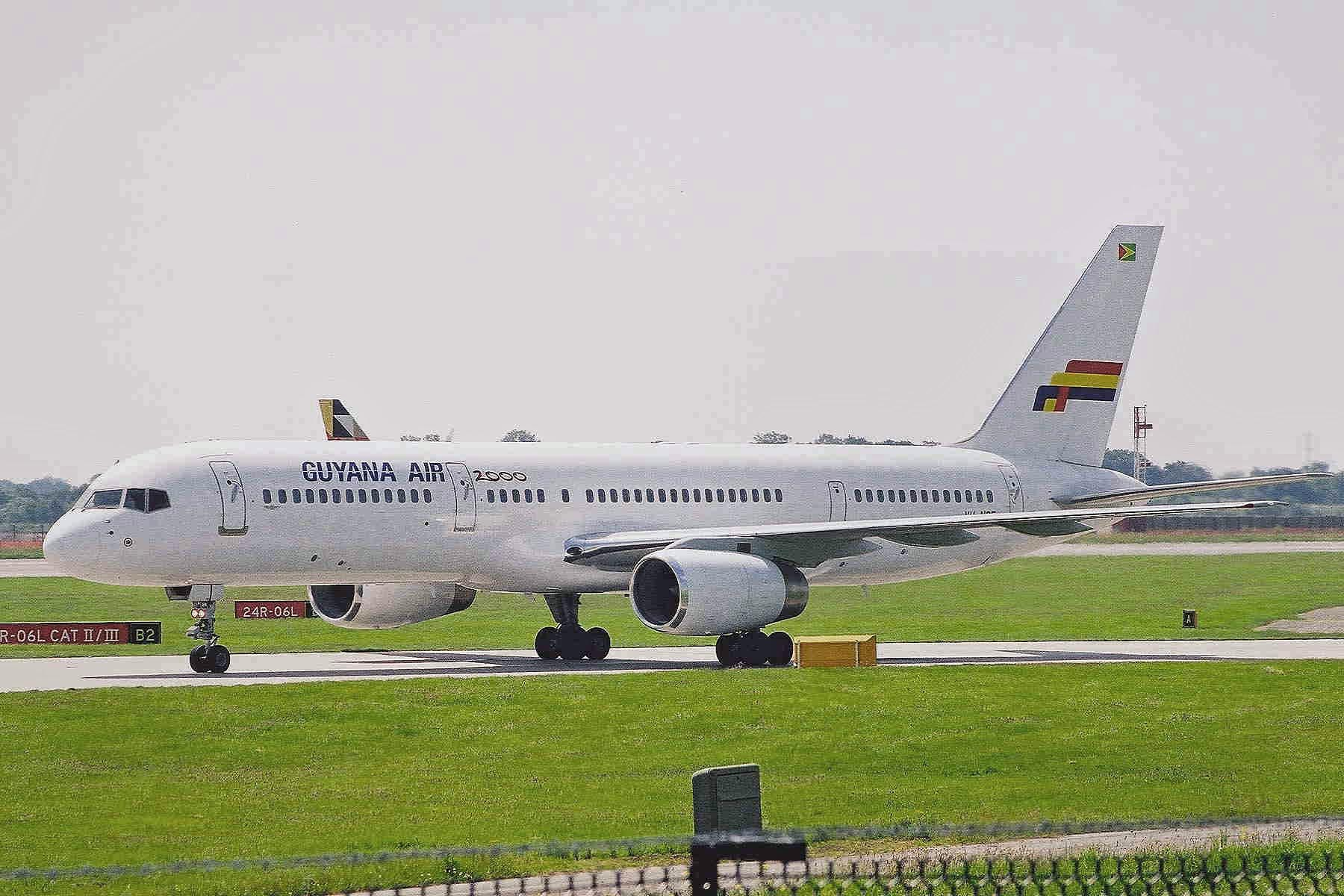
Guyana Air 2000's Boeing 757-200 taxiing at Manchester Airport in 2000

Guyana Airways operated the following aircraft types during its existence:

Guyana Airways fleet
Aircraft	Total	Introduced	Retired	Notes
Airbus A300B4	1	1995	1996	
Airbus A300-600R	1	1999	2000	Leased from AWAS
Boeing 707-120B	1	1992	1993	Leased from Omega Aerial Refueling Services
Boeing 707-320B	8	1981	1994	Leased from several companies
Boeing 737-200	2	1980	1982	Leased from Maersk Air
Boeing 757-200	1	1993	1999	Leased from ILFC
Boeing 757-200	1	2000	2001	Leased from AWAS
de Havilland Canada DHC-4 Caribou	2	1970	1981	
de Havilland Canada DHC-6 Twin Otter	5	1967	1999	
Douglas C-47 Skytrain	4	1947	1979	
Douglas DC-6	6	1974	1985	
Douglas DC-8-52	1	1993	1994	Leased from Advance Air Charters
Grumman G-21 Goose	4	1945	1973	
Hawker Siddeley HS 748	2	1977	1999	
Ilyushin Il-62	1	1984	1984	Leased from Aeroflot
Ireland Neptune	1	1939	1955	
Lockheed L-188CF Electra	3	1975	1977	
Tupolev Tu-154B2	2	1985	1985	Leased from TAROM
Tupolev Tu-154M	1	1986	1988	

== Accidents and incidents ==
- On December 3, 1973, a de Havilland Canada DHC-6 Twin Otter (registered 8R-GCP) crashed into a mountain while descending at Kurupung, Cuyuni-Mazaruni. Only one of the four passengers survived.
- On November 30, 1981, a Douglas DC-6 (registered N3486F) caught fire after an engine failure when taking off at George F. L. Charles Airport. The aircraft crashed near the airport, bursting into flames. All 3 crew members were killed.

== See also ==
- List of defunct airlines of Guyana
