= Kako River =

River in Guyana

Location
- Country: Guyana

Physical characteristics
- Mouth
  - location: Mazaruni River
  - coordinates: 5°44′00″N 60°35′00″W

The Kako River is a river in the Cuyuni-Mazaruni region of Guyana and one of the largest tributaries of the Mazaruni River.

'Kako' is the Akawaio word for jasper which is found in the river.

== Mining ==
Mining is prevalent throughout Guyana's waterways; there are about 144 mining claims and concessions allocated on the Kako River and its tributaries. Gold mining, done by dredging, pollutes waterways and in 2012, a series of conflicts arose between miners and Amerindians who rely on the water from the Kako River. After a third attempt was made to mine the area, an ex-parte injunction was brought against Toshao Mario Hastings. Amerindian groups defended Hastings, pointing out that the government is denying the people protection of their own land. The people of the surrounding village fear the Kako River to become polluted like the Mazaruni River.

In March 2013, the United Nations Committee on International Convention on the Elimination of All Forms of Racial Discrimination expressed concern over mining on titled land at the Cuyuni/Mazaruni communities of Kako and Isseneru.

== Settlement ==
There is a village called Kako that is home to about 700 people, mostly Akawaio. The Kako River is an important source of water and food, as well as supporting village agriculture and transportation. Akiwaio language is the predominant spoken language in the village. Mining a subsistence agriculture are the main economic activities. The village has one church, Seventh-day Adventist.

== See also ==
- List of rivers of Guyana

== Bibliography ==
- Rand McNally, The New International Atlas, 1993.
