= List of rivers of Guyana =

This is a list of rivers in Guyana.

== By drainage basin ==
This list is arranged by drainage basin, with respective tributaries indented under each larger stream's name.

=== Atlantic Ocean ===
- Amazon River (Brazil)
  - Negro River (Brazil)
    - Branco River (Brazil)
      - Takutu River
        - Ireng River
- Courantyne River
  - Kutari River
  - Coeroeni River
  - New River (South America)
    - Oronoque River
- Berbice River
  - Canje River
- Abary River
- Mahaicony River
- Mahaica River
- Demerara River
  - Haiama River
  - Haianari Creek
  - Haiakwa Creek
  - John River
  - Madawini
  - Kamuni
  - Hauraruni
  - Tenabu
  - Madabadeen

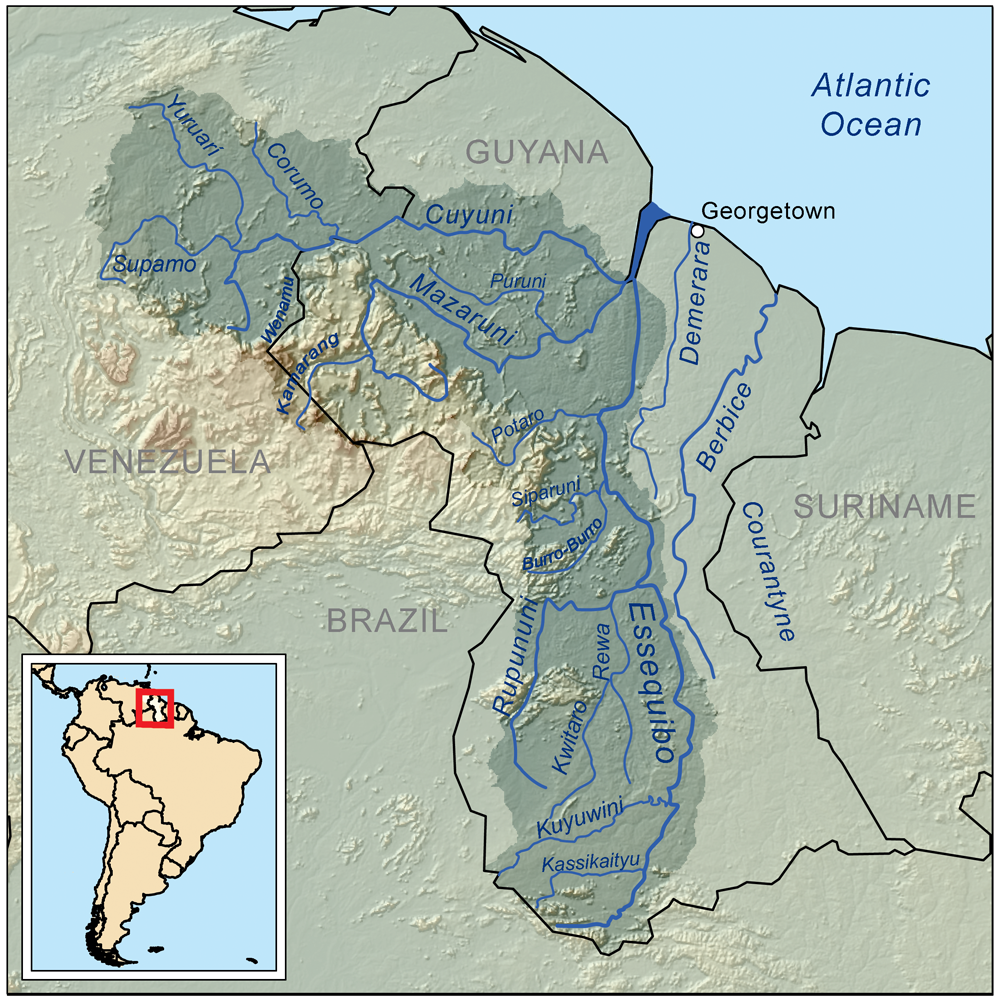
Essequibo River Drainage Basin

- Essequibo River
  - Mazaruni River
    - Kako River
    - Kukui
    - Kamarang River
      - Eping River
    - Issineru River
    - Meamu River
    - Kurupung River
    - Merume River
    - Puruni River
  - Cuyuni River
    - Akarabisi
    - Arimu River
    - Ekereku River
    - Iroma
    - Akarabisi
    - Kopang
    - Oko River
    - Wenamu River
      - Akaiwang River
  - Potaro River
    - Arnik River
    - Kuribrong River
  - Konawaruk River
  - Siparuni River
    - Burro-Burro River
  - Rupununi River
    - Rewa River
      - Kwitaro River
  - Kuyuwini River
  - Kassikaityu River
- Pomeroon River
  - Wakapau River
- Moruka River
- Waini River
  - Barama River
- Orinoco River (Venezuela)
  - Barima River
    - Kaituma River
  - Amacuro River (Amakura River)

== See also ==
- List of rivers of the Americas by coastline

== Bibliography ==
- Rand McNally, The New International Atlas, 1993.
