= Alleluia church =

Syncretic religion in Guyana

Alleluia (alternative spellings: Hallelujah, Areruya, Aleluya) is a syncretic religion combining Christianity and traditions practiced by Carib-speaking Indigenous peoples in Guyana.

Alleluia is Guyana's only traditional religion. It is also practiced in nearby Brazil and Venezuela. The village of Amokokopai in the Cuyuni-Mazaruni region serves as the headquarters of the church. The upper Mazaruni River and the Pacaraima Mountains cover the area where the religion has adherents. Services are conducted in Arecuna, Patamona, Waiwai and Makushi language.

Music and dance are also important aspects of Alleluia, using instruments that pre-date European arrival. Communicative worship practices engage the "spiritual being as a vessel" to serve the purpose of "a solemn worship to the supreme father in heaven". A key concept in Alleluia is akwa, meaning "light, brightness or life", symbolized by the sun and as an abstraction of God's place. Akwalu describes the concept of spirit, in contrast to akwalupö which is the lack of spirit, or something "dead, cast-off, gone or past".

== Origin ==
There is some of variety and embellishment to the origin story of Alleluia, but is often linked to a Macushi of the Kanuku Mountains by the name of Bichiwung. He had been baptized and taken to England by missionaries, but he felt they were denying him access to God. In a dream, Bichiwung spoke with God and was told about Alleluia. Upon returning home, he started preaching his new faith and his gardens were plentiful, connecting his faith to the bounty of the earth. Because of his success, he was killed by envious sorcerers after multiple attempts. Alleluia began roughly between 1845 and 1885.

Abel, an Akawaio, was credited with founding the first church in Amokokopai. He heard of Alleluia from other Akawaio who had learned of it when visiting the Macushi. Originally, Abel was a sorcerer and had "laughed at the new religion", but could see God when he prayed and gave up sorcery. God gave the Amerindian bible (Paba kareda, "God's book") to him.

== History ==
Indigenous belief in the Guianas relies on the piaichang, a spiritual leader or shaman, who has the ability to communicate between humans and spiritual beings.

When Europeans arrived in the Guianas, they relied greatly on the indigenous people for surviving the unfamiliar tropical environment, and benefitted from favorable trade relationships. Indigenous people were also employed for capturing escaped slaves and as a militia force. Alleluia formed roughly around the time of emancipation in British Guiana, as colonial gifts dwindled and Christian missionaries from Europe moved further into Guyana's interior hinterlands.

The prophets of Alleluia came from a variety of backgrounds, so texts are multilingual. Although original practices of the piaichang have lessened, the ability of 'soul flight' has been attributed to obtaining Alleluia doctrines, and piai "coexisted compatibly" in the early years of the religion.

Alleluia spread quickly via the Akawaio "network of kinship and locality" and along well-established trade routes.

== See also ==
- Religion in Guyana

Native American religions

== See also ==
- Alleluia naming and blessing of off-shore oil exploration well in Demerara Waves.
