= Oko River =

Coordinates: 6°28′N 58°52′W

Location
- Country: Guyana
- Region: Cuyuni-Mazaruni

The Oko River is a river of Guyana, a tributary of the Wenamu River and a part of the middle-Mazaruni.

Mining is a major economic activity in the area and there are medium-scale international operations in the area. Illegal dredging and clear cutting practices associated with mining cause some damage to the Oko area.

In 1999, the bones of a megatherium, an extinct gigantic sloth, were discovered by miners around Omai and the Oko Creek, Cuyuni River. A model of the megatherium was created and put on display at the Guyana National Museum.

There is also a settlement by the name Oko.

== See also ==
- List of rivers of Guyana
