= Isseneru =

Isseneru Iꞌsineru
- Amerindian Village
- Location within Guyana
- Coordinates: 6°22′00″N 60°22′00″W
- Country: Guyana
- Region: Cuyuni-Mazaruni

Government
  - Toshao: Dhaneff Larson

Population
  - Estimate (2013): 300

Isseneru (Akawaio: Iꞌsineru) is an Amerindian settlement in the Cuyuni-Mazaruni region of Guyana, approximately 15–20 miles west of Kurupung.

It is a community of about 300 mainly Akawaio Amerindians, living among the hilly, forested banks of the Mazaruni River. Gold mining is a major economic activity in the area. Isseneru received land title around 2007, and demarcation was completed 2009.

Known as ‘Issululu’ in Akawaio, the name means 'mass grave'. The name came from an event in which many people died from an unknown illness. Malaria is a common affliction among residents, and the remoteness affects the availability of medicine. Jaguar attacks can occur as a result of land encroachment by humans.

== Public services and economy ==
The village has a multi-purpose centre, guest house, and a benab for gatherings and a recreation area. It also has a health centre, an Alleluia church that also has services for Seven Days Adventists and Anglicans, and primary school. Students from Isseneru attend secondary school in the regional capital Bartica. Electricity is come by generators.

Christmas is an important holiday in this community, bringing together all the Christian denominations and the day is celebrated with a huge village luncheon. Popular foods include traditional tuma pot and cassava bread, as well as food from other cultures within Guyana. Beverages include piwari, cassiri, potato and (sugar) cane juice.

Cassava and other ground provisions are major agricultural products of the area. Casar, also known as Bashwar, is a locally produced cassava-potato beverage. The area is of interest for bio-diversity research, and the surrounding areas are home to endemic plants.

The village toshao as of 2013 was Lewis Larson, Dhaneff Larson in 2015.

== Transportation ==
The river is a major mode of transportation within the village; canoes getting people where they want to go, but most have an outboard engine.

Access into the village from the coast via aircraft starts by flying to Olive Creek, then an hour-long boat ride up the Mazaruni. There is also a road up to Olive Creek from the lower Mazaruni or a day-long trip from Parika via jet boat.

== Mining conflicts ==
25 January 2013, staged a protest in Georgetown, to voice their disapproval over a court decision made by Judge Diana Insanally to allow Joan Chang, a mine concession holder, to extract gold on lands within the village. According to the village, "the ruling was unjust because according to Guyana’s Amerindian Act 2006, any miner who wishes to enter and operate on Amerindian lands must first obtain the ‘permission’ of the relevant Village Council, comply with all legislation, and provide compensation to locals". Judge Insanally's decision was that mine permits obtained after implementation of the act were exempt, and Chang's claim was secured in 1992. According to Jean La Rose, the ruling establishes that land title granted to Amerindian villages are merely 'shell titles' and diminish Amerindian rights to protect their lands.

In 2015, the government made a cease order for another dredging operation in the area.

Gold mining in Guyana is mainly done by dredging the banks of its waterways, and rising sediments impact the biodiversity and thus the food supply of these rivers to the village. Mercury levels are also high due to gold mining. A 2001 Institute of Applied Science and Technology study found that between 89 and 96% of hair samples from residents of Issenaru exceeded the tolerable limits of mercury as set by the WHO. Miners who come from Brazil are also associated with higher rates of mercury usage. Environmental Protection Agency testing on soil and water of Issenaru in December 2013 also showed to over healthy limits.

Related social issues are the threat of drugs and prostitution associated with mining.

Miners on the community's titled land pay a 12% tribute to the village council.

== See also ==
- Mining in Guyana
