= Ekereku River =

Ekareku River

Location
- Country: Guyana

Physical characteristics
- Mouth: Wenamu River
  - location: Guyana
  - coordinates: 06°43′00″N 60°56′00″W

The Ekareku River is a river of Guyana, a tributary of the Wenamu River.

The Ekereku is one of the major tributaries of the Cuyuni River. Gold mining by dredging along the banks is a major economic activity along the Ekereu and in the greater region.

Services of the area include a police outpost and airstrip.

Sakaika Falls is on the Ekereko.

== See also ==
- List of rivers of Guyana

== Bibliography ==
- Rand McNally, The New International Atlas, 1993.
