= Akaiwang River =

Location
- Country: Guyana

Physical characteristics
- Mouth: Wenamu River
  - coordinates: 6°39′9″N 59°32′3″W

Basin features
- Waterfalls: Akaiwang Falls

The Akaiwang River is a tributary of the Wenamu River in the Cuyuni-Mazaruni region of Guyana.

The river features the Akaiwang Falls. Located at 6' 40' W 59' 42'. The falls are also known as the Wakupang or Akaiwong Cataracts.

Akaiwang River is also used for gold mining operation. The surrounding forest area was licensed for balata bleeding.

== See also ==
- List of rivers of Guyana

== Bibliography ==
- Rand McNally, The New International Atlas, 1993.
