= Issano =

Issano Iꞌsano (Akawaio)
- Village
- Location in Guyana
- Coordinates: 5°48′49″N 59°25′25″W
- Country: Guyana
- Region: Cuyuni-Mazaruni

Population (2012)
  - Total: 220

Issano (Akawaio: Iꞌsano) is a village of Cuyuni-Mazaruni (Region 7), Guyana. It is located along the Mazaruni River, and is a hub for mining.

In 2012, the population was 220. Issano is a mostly Amerindian community. It has a primary school (Saint Martin's), health centre and airstrip (ICAO: SYIS). The main overland roadway is the Issano road, which runs 75 miles (121 km) from the Bartica/Potaro road and extends approximately 52 miles (84 km) to the Issano landing.

== Mining ==
Geologically, Issano lies on the Barama-Mazaruni Supergroup, a formation composed of greenstone belts, which are rich with metals, and gold is abundant along these edges. The 14 Mile Issano Landing Area was licensed to be mined as an open-pit operation by Troy Resources, but residents' demand to stay in the area prompted Troy to adjust their license to a different area. By 2015, the area had already been occupied for thirty years.

Issano has high rates of malaria, due to more people moving to the hinterlands for mining and vectors created from water collecting in holes dug for mining purposes.

== Notable resident ==
In 1968 Guyanese artist and archeologist Denis Williams built a homestead in Issano, where he made his first archeological excavation in Guyana, finding Amerindian artifacts.

== See also ==
- Mining in Guyana
