= Koatse =

Koatse River Poatse
- Location within Guyana

Location
- Country: Guyana

Physical characteristics
- Source
  - coordinates: 5.4450°N 60.1398°W
- Mouth: Mazaruni River
  - coordinates: 5.5127°N 60.1254°W

Koatse River (also Poatse) is a stream in the Cuyuni-Mazaruni area in Guyana, South America.

A botanical survey of the Koatse River Valley was a part of the Biological Diversity of the Guiana Shield Program of the Smithsonian Institution and the New York Botanical Garden holds plant specimens of earlier collections.
