= Mazaruni =

Mazaruni may refer to:

- Mazaruni River in Guyana
- SS Mazaruni, Guyanese cargo ship
