= Kamarang Airport =

Airport in Guyana

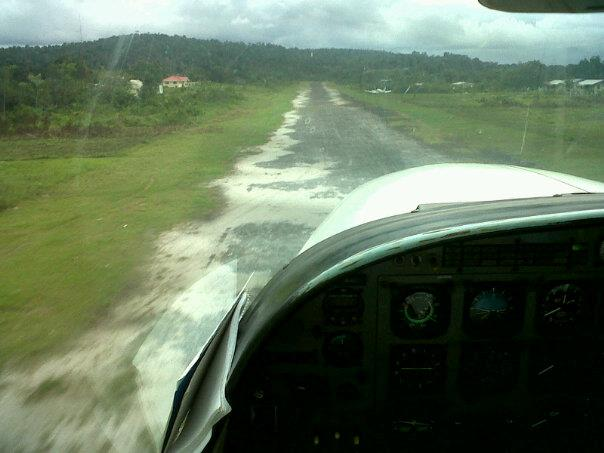
- IATA: KAR; ICAO: SYKM; WMO: 81005

Summary
- Serves: Kamarang
- Elevation AMSL: 1,601 ft / 488 m
- Coordinates: 5°51′55″N 60°36′50″W

Map
- Location in Guyana

Runways
Direction	Length		Surface
Direction	m	ft	Surface
07/25	1,000	3,281	Asphalt
- Sources: Google Maps GCM

Kamarang Airport (IATA: KAR, ICAO: SYKM) is an airport serving the town of Kamarang, in the Cuyuni-Mazaruni Region of Guyana.

The Kamarang non-directional beacon (Ident: KAM) is 2 kilometres (1.2 mi) north of the field.

The paved runway (asphalt) is 1,220 metres long (4000') by 18 metres wide (60').

== See also ==
- List of airports in Guyana
- Transport in Guyana
