= Kurupung River =

River in Guyana

Coordinates: 6°14′N 60°09′W

Location
- Country: Guyana

Physical characteristics
- Mouth: Mazaruni River

The Kurupung River is a tributary of the middle Mazaruni River in Guyana.

Kumerau Falls is a feature of the river.

== Mineral resources ==
The area around the river has been used for diamond mining. It was the location for Guyana's first diamond rush of the 1920s. The largest stone recorded as found weighed 29 and five-sixteenth carats and was brought to the commissioner of lands and mines in 1921. It was called 'Kurupung' and bought for USD $4000.

U3O8 Corp of Canada prospected for uranium in the Kurupung batholith around 2010.

== Settlement ==
Kurupung is a mining village along the river.

Since the 1970s, the Kurupung River has been of interest for a possible hydroelectric dam. The project was criticized by the Akawaio, because it would flood out their communities. In 2013, Sandspring Resources signed a Memorandum of Understanding with the government of Guyana giving the company the exclusive right to develop the Kurupung River Hydroelectric Project, estimated to produce 100 megawatts of electricity, half of which to support their mining project at Toroparu.

== See also ==
- List of rivers of Guyana

== Bibliography ==
- Rand McNally, The New International Atlas, 1993.
