= Akawaio people =

Akawaio
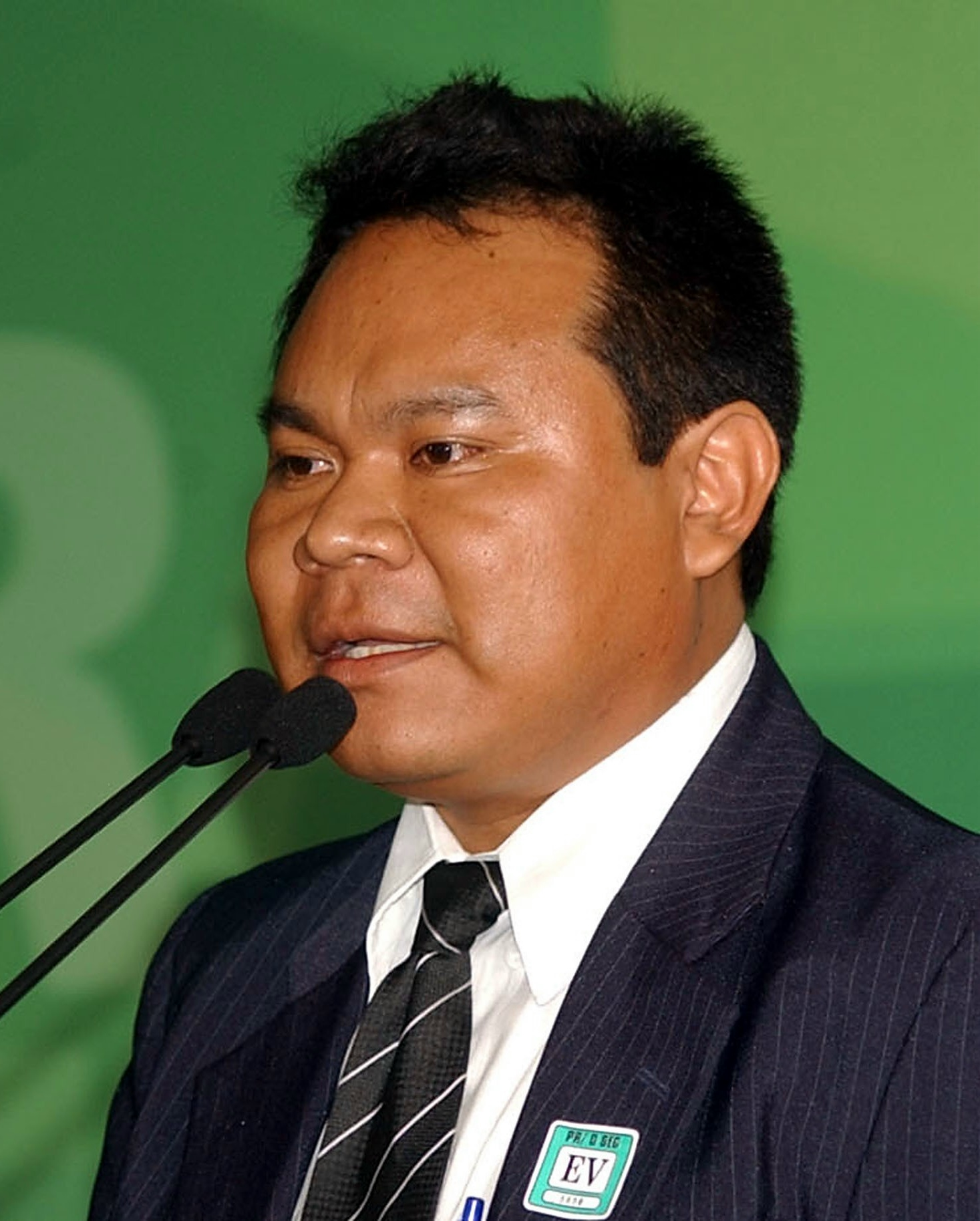

Total population
- c. 6,800

Regions with significant populations
- Guyana: c. 4,000 (1990)
- Brazil: 1,728 (2020)
- Venezuela: 1,071 (2011)

Languages
- Akawaio

The Akawaio (Note: Also Acaguayo or Acahuayo) are an Indigenous people who live in Roraima (Brazil), Guyana, and Venezuela. They are closely related to the Ingarikó and Patamona. The Akawaio speak a dialect of the Kapong language; their dialect is used by 5,000 to 6,000 speakers.

== History ==
The first colonial records of the Akawaio date to the mid-17th century.

The Akawaio were known as prominent traders in the region. At the time of European contact, Akawaio lived on Guyana's coastal belt, moving inland as lands were taken for use as plantations. Akawaios, as well as Caribs, were used to capture other Amerindians as slaves as well as hunt down runaway slaves that has been brought from Africa.

In Guyana, Akawaio settlements are concentrated around the upper Mazaruni, Barama, upper Pomeroon, Demerara, Wenamu, and upper Cuyuni rivers.

Half of the Akawaio living along the Middle Mazaruni River moved to the Upper Mazaruni to avoid conflicts with gold and diamond miners in the 1950s. These Akawaio returned to the Middle Mazaruni in the 1970s and founded Isseneru due to a proposed dam and hydroelectric power plant which would have flooded their land. Around 260 square miles of land along the Mazaruni River was given to the Akawaio of Isseneru by Guyana in 2007, after failed attempts by the Akawaio in 1987 and 1994. The initial land claim was 1,000 square miles.

== Culture ==
=== Language ===
The Akawaio refer to themselves and their language as Kapóng. They are closely related to the Ingarikó and Patamona, who also refer to themselves as and speak Kapóng.

=== Religion ===
William Henry Brett proselytized to the Akawaio in the 19th century.

Makonaima was reported as the supreme deity of the Akawaio by Brett. Akawaios have polytheistic beliefs. Mythological figures like Makunaima, Kanaima, Iwarrika and Sikɨ (Sigu) are an important part of their culture. The most important god is Makunaima because, in their opinion, he created the tribe. Furthermore, they associate some natural phenomena to some divinities like Iwarrika who is blamed for flooding the earth. The Shaman plays an important part in their religious practice. He meets the god during hallucinogenic rituals when tobacco and a specific diet are used.

Hallelujah or alleluia, a combination of Christianity and traditional religious beliefs, is the religion of the Akawaio. Bichiwung, a Macushi, created alleluia and traveled across the coast with a priest. He claimed to receive a revelation that missionaries were hiding God's true nature from the indigenous people. Bichiwung, who serves the role of Jesus in the religion, was killed for his teachings, but was resurrected by white medicine he received from God. He was then dismembered, but his wife gathered his parts and restored him by smearing the white medicine on them. He was dismembered again, but was not restored by the white medicine as some of his parts were missing.

== Works cited ==
=== Books ===
- Carlin, Eithne; Léglise, Isabelle; Migge, Bettina; Fat, Paul (2015). In and Out of Suriname: Language, Mobility and Identity. Brill Publishers. ISBN 9789004280113.
- Kirsch, Stuart (2018). Engaged Anthropology: Politics beyond the Text. University of California Press. ISBN 9780520970090.
- Whitehead, Neil (2002). Dark Shamans: Kanaimà and the Poetics of Violent Death. Duke University Press. ISBN 0822329883.

=== Journals ===
- Butt, Audrey (1953). "The Burning Fountain Whence It Came". Social and Economic Studies. 2 (1). University of the West Indies: 102–116. doi:10.2307/27850944. JSTOR 27850944.
