= Imataka Mountains =

Mountains in Guyana and Venezuela

- Location within Venezuela

Highest point
- Coordinates: 7°45′N 61°00′W

The Imataka Mountains are located in the north-west of Guyana and north-east of Venezuela.

The Imataka mountains separate the Barama River system from the Cuyuni. The mountains are also the source of the Barama river.

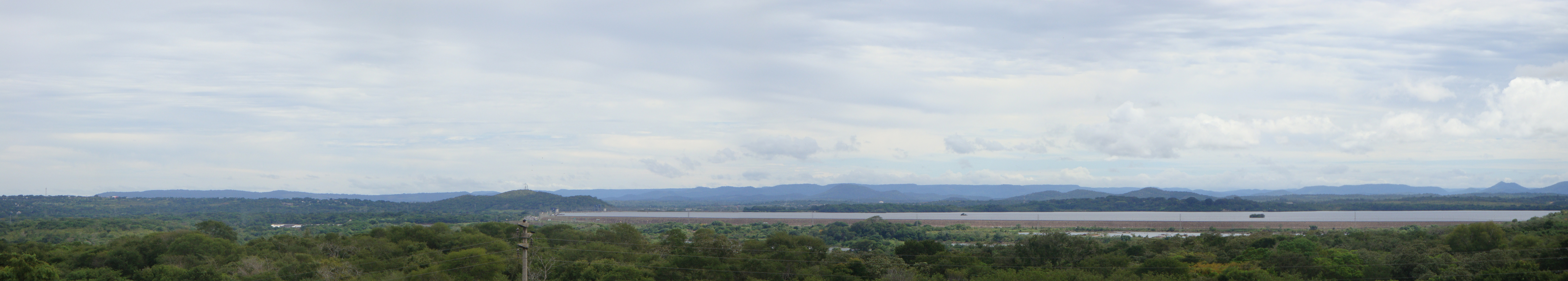
Imataka Mountains from Guayana City
