= Kartabo, Guyana =

Kartabo
- Village
- Location in Guayana
- Coordinates: 6.3446°N 58.7019°W
- Country: Guyana
- Region: Cuyuni-Mazaruni

Population (2012)
  - Total: 332

Kartabo is a village in the Cuyuni-Mazaruni Region of Guyana.

Kartabo is on the lower Mazaruni River, 6 miles from Bartica. Its population is 332 inhabitants as of 2012. The village has a mixed population, the largest group being Kalina Amerindians. Residents are involved in fishing, farming, boat-building and logging. Some people are employed at the Tiperu Stone Quarries. The village has a community centre, medical post, and a school.

There are a variety of mammals found near this village.

Kartabo has a crater on Mars named after it.
