= Imbaimadai Airport =

Airport in Guyana

- IATA: IMB; ICAO: SYIB

Summary
- Serves: Imbaimadai
- Elevation AMSL: 1,650 ft / 503 m
- Coordinates: 5°42′25″N 60°17′45″W

Map
- Location in Guyana

Runways
Direction	Length		Surface
Direction	m	ft	Surface
07/25	1,219	3,999	Grass
- Sources: GCM Google Maps SkyVector

Imbaimadai Airport (IATA: IMB, ICAO: SYIB) is an airport serving the village of Imbaimadai, in the Cuyuni-Mazaruni Region of Guyana. The airport's only runway is a grass-surface, 1,219-meter strip.

== See also ==
- List of airports in Guyana
- Transport in Guyana
