= Agatash =

- Village
- Location in Guyana
- Coordinates: 6.37709°N 58.61910°W
- Country: Guyana
- Region: Cuyuni-Mazaruni

Population (2012)
  - Total: 740
- Climate: Af

Agatash is a village in the Cuyuni-Mazaruni Region of Guyana. It is located about 3 miles (4.8 km) south of Bartica along the Essequibo River opposite Sloth Island.

== Overview ==
The area used to be crown lands. In the early 1900s, the government of Demerara awarded 1,500 acres (610 ha) for a lime estate. Agatash is made of two Arawak words meaning water and land.

The economy is based on farming and mining. Agatash has a primary school and a health centre. The nearest hospital is in Bartica. Electricity is provided by solar panels donated by the Eerepami Regenwaldstiftung. The village depends on rainwater for drinking. In July 2021, the road to Bartica was paved.

== Sloth Island ==
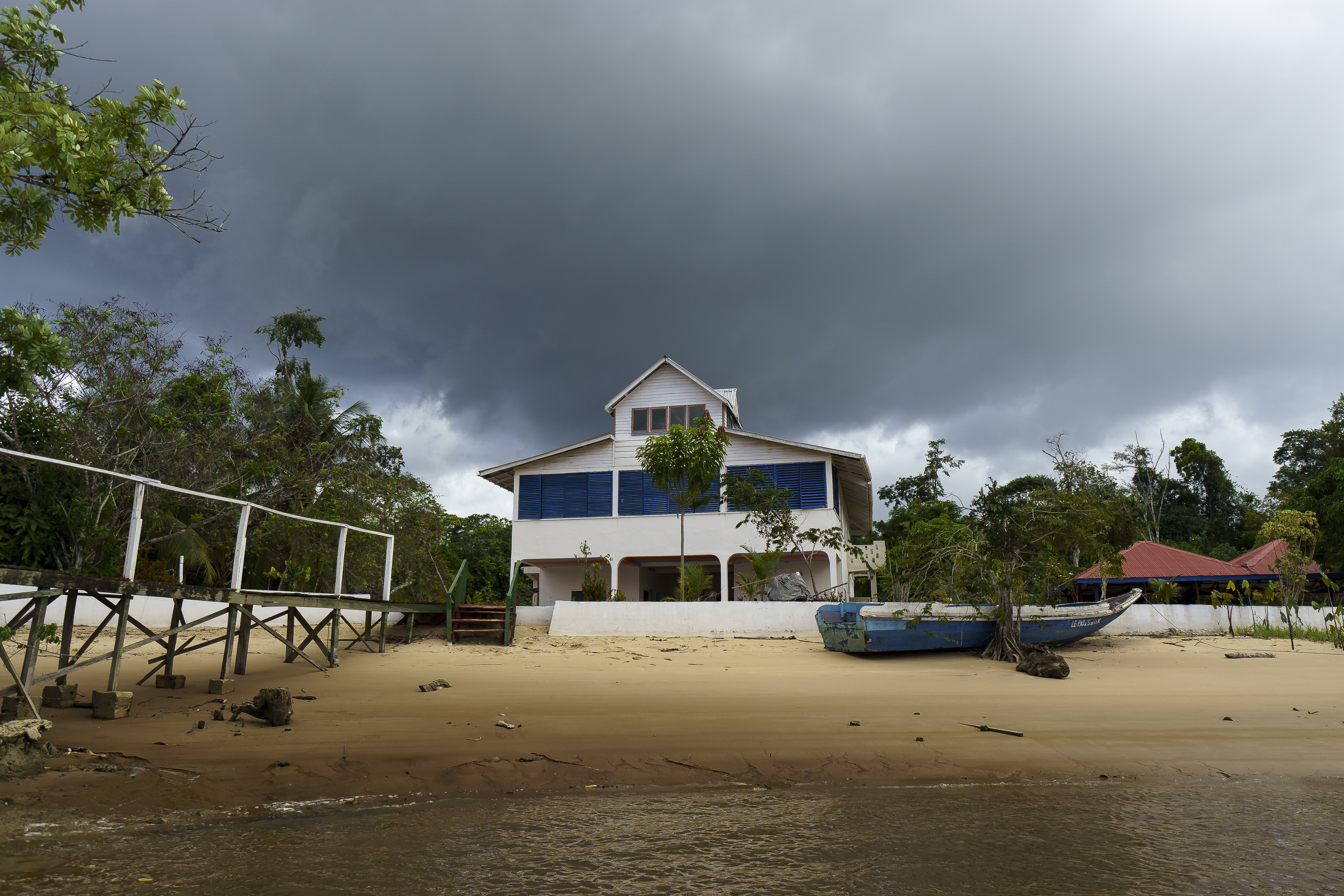

Sloth Island is an ecotourism resort located on an island in the Essequibo River. The island is opposite Agatash, and measures 160 acres (65 ha).

The island was uninhabited, contained pristine rainforests, and was home to many monkeys, sloths, and birds. In the early 1990s, five acres were developed into a tourist resort which was built by Amerindians from Agatash. The remainder has been designated nature reserve. The island can be accessed by a five minute boat ride from Bartica.
