= Eping River =

Coordinates: 6°09′N 60°03′W

Location
- Country: Guyana

The Eping River is a tributary of the Kamarang River in Region 8 of Guyana.

The area is a part of the Roraima Basin, which is an area rich in gold deposits and has been extensively mined.

Eping Landing is a small settlement along the river. The river runs by Mt. Raschaxe a tepui in the Merume mountain range.

Plants first collected in the surrounding area include psychotria sandwithiana (a flowering plant), rhynchocladium stayermarkii, compsoneura ulei (tree).

== See also ==
- List of rivers of Guyana
- Mining in Guyana

== Bibliography ==
- Rand McNally, The New International Atlas, 1993.
