= Rewa River (Guyana) =

Coordinates: 3°53′N 58°48′W

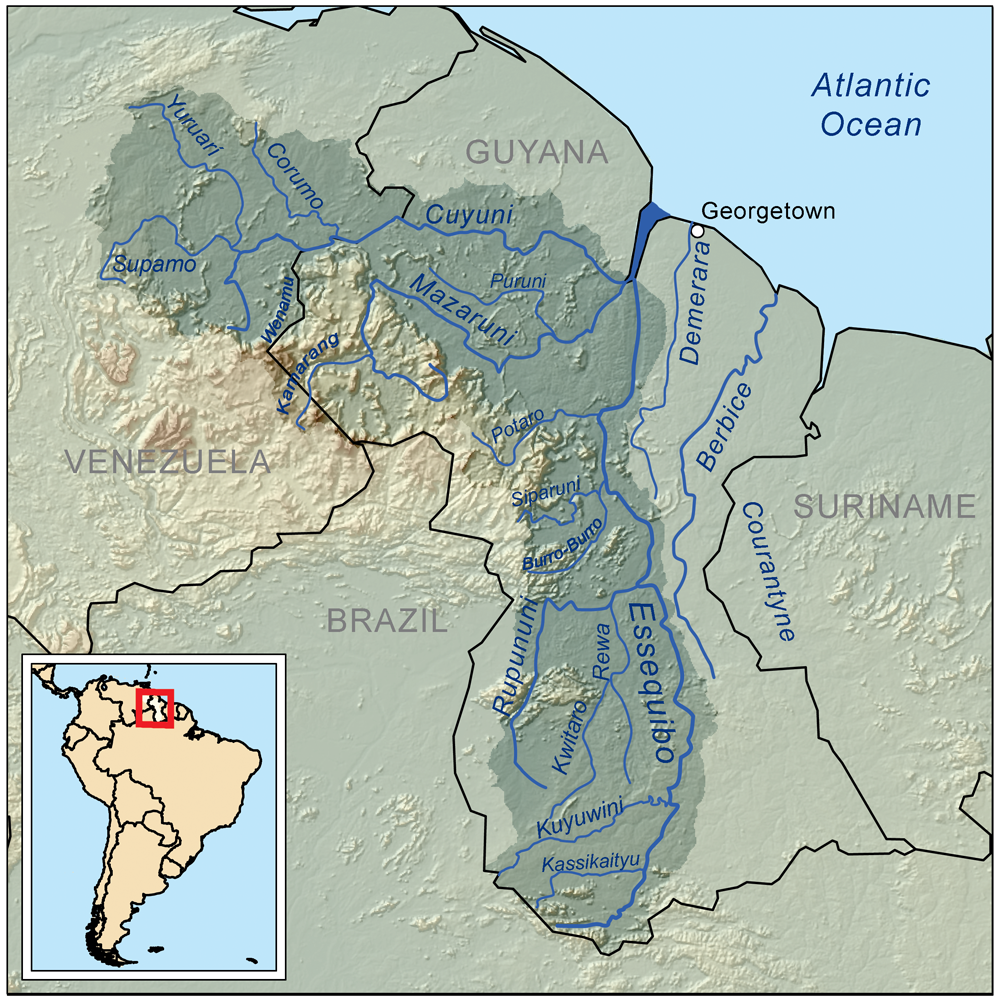

Location
- Country: Guyana

The Rewa River is a river of Guyana. It is a tributary of the Rupununi River.

== See also ==
- List of rivers of Guyana
