= Guyanaite =

Chromium oxide mineral

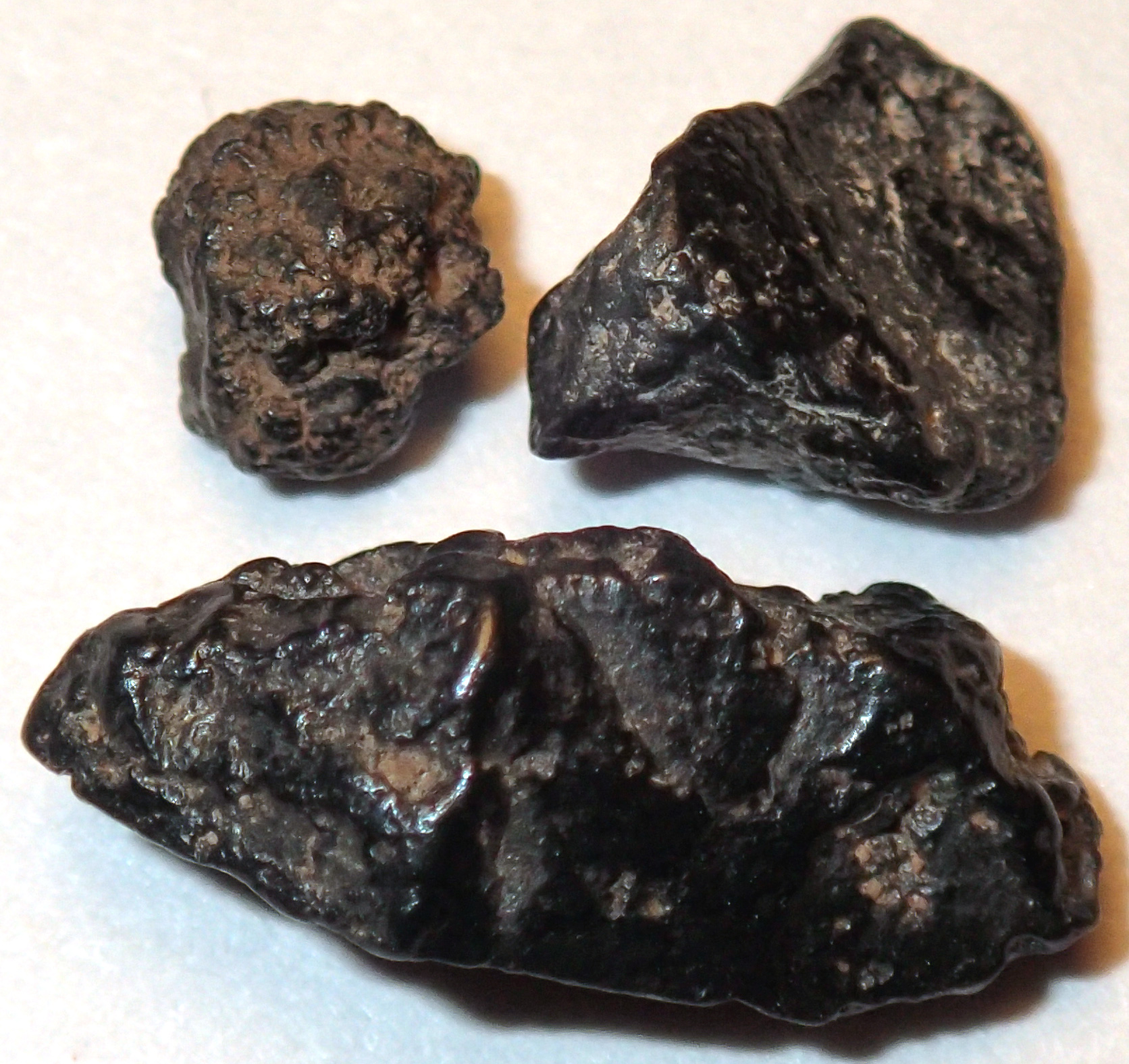
- Merumite rock fragments, Director Creek, northwestern Guyana. Largest specimen's long axis is 8.5 mm. Merumite is composed of guyanaite and six other chromium bearing minerals and has only been reported as small, loose alluvial grains in the upper branches of Director Creek.

General
- Category: Oxide mineral
- Formula: CrO(OH)
- IMA symbol: Guy
- Crystal system: Orthorhombic
- Crystal class: Dipyramidal (mmm); H-M symbol: (2/m 2/m 2/m)
- Space group: Pnnm

Identification

Guyanaite, CrO(OH), is a chromium oxide mineral that forms as an intergrowth with other chromium oxide minerals known as bracewellite (CrO(OH)) and grimaldiite (CrO(OH)) as well as eskolaite (Cr_{2}O_{3}) which in early findings were nearly indistinguishable from one another. These oxides formed so closely as intergrowths with one another that they were initially, and erroneously, identified as a single definite mineral previously known as merumite. Because of its complex history and the previously undiscovered nature of these chromium oxide polymorphs, the relevance of any information found in many early experiments involving the mineral formerly known as merumite in regard to guyanaite is unknown and it is implied that in any further reference of merumite it will have been composed of a mineral assemblage including guyanaite. The rare occurrence and complexity from intergrowth of naturally occurring guyanaite hinders experimental work, leading to laboratory synthesized samples which help to better experiment with the minerals.

== Composition ==
Guyanaite has a chemical formula of Cr^{3+}O^{2−}(OH^{−}), it was first identified primarily by means of X-ray powder diffraction and chemical data and has been confirmed in recent studies by means of X-ray diffraction, optical reflectance, and infrared absorption (IR) spectroscopy. It is both trimorphous with, and shares an exact chemical formula with both bracewellite and grimaldiite which are also chromium oxides, differing only in their mineralogical structure being orthorhombic with space group Pnnm, orthorhombic with space group Pbnm, and hexagonal with space group R3m, respectively. It is formed from the parent compound of CrO_{2} by means of one of two processes. The first process for the conversion of CrO_{2} into CrOOH occurs through a reduction of CrO_{2} in the presence of H_{2}O and a reductant (oxalic acid or steel) resulting in the chemical equation of (2CrO_{2} + H_{2}O → 2CrO(OH) + 1/2O_{2}). The second process is an oxidation of the chromium ion using a solution as a solvent. Such a reaction is represented by the chemical equation (3CrO_{2} + 2NaOH → Na_{2}CrO_{4} + 2CrO(OH)).

== Structure ==
The identical chemical composition of guyanaite and other polymorphs of chromium oxide requires that the structure of the mineral become the primary characteristic in defining each mineral and differentiating them from one another, making it the single most significant attribute of guyanaite. Laboratory synthesized samples are identified by their separate crystal forms and denoted as α-CrO(OH) (grimaldiite), ß-CrO(OH) (guyanaite), and γ-CrO(OH) (bracewellite). Guyanaite has an orthorhombic crystal structure, a space group of Pnnm, and has point group 2/m2/m2/m. Its cell dimensions are a = 4.857 Å , b = 4.295 Å , c = 2.958 Å and the structure is based upon a hexagonal closest packing of oxygen atoms parallel to (101) while edge-sharing CrO_{6} octahedra form along [001] connected by oxygen-corners which forms layers of octahedral parallel to (101). Simply put, the Cr atoms are each surrounded by six oxygen atoms, and short hydrogen bonds are located in a mirror plane perpendicular to the c-axis. These bonds in neighboring planes are aligned in opposite directions to one another resulting in a lower level of symmetry than the parent compound.

Studies done in order to clarify the hydrogen bonding effect and determine if a hydrogen-centered model or hydrogen off centered model represented them best determined there to be no significant difference between either of the models due to the hydrogen-bond distance being so close to the critical distance.

== Physical properties ==
Because of the high level of difficulty in obtaining a pure mineral sample of guyanaite, experimentation is carried out on samples of a known complex composition which is determined by x-ray and optical studies. The complex intergrowth of chromium oxide minerals results in poor samples for analyzing physical properties such as hardness, measured density, cleavage, habit, and luster giving incomplete data and an inability to determine values for each. A number of “merumite” grains shown to be almost entirely guyanaite by means of x-ray diffraction do however have a yellow-brown streak. The other known physical properties vary greatly based on which one of the two major locations this mineral is found. Samples from Guyana are distinguished by the brown, red, and sometimes green color of prismatic crystals as much as .1 mm long and a light-green to greenish-black variety is occasionally found forming in prismatic microcrystalline aggregates where samples from the Otokumpu mine in Finland occur as aggregates of golden-brown to greenish-brown fibers which replace smaller crystals of eskolaite that are less than 1.0 mm in size.

== Geologic occurrence ==
Guyanaite as well as its polymorphs were discovered first in eskolaite from within alluvial shingle deposits of the Merume River in what was British Guiana where they occurred as fine-grained aggregates with one another. They were described as small rounded shingles in close association with quartz. Its presence with free gold, pyrophylite rosettes, and double-terminated quartz crystals also implies that these occurrences come from hydrothermal origins. It also occurs in Finland in sulfide-rich veins cutting skarnified quartzites at the Outokumpu mine where it developed as fibrous pseudomorphs. Mineral associations include carbonate minerals, zinc-bearing chromite, rutile, uraninite, nolanite, graphite, zircon, titanite, and corundum as well as in chromium-rich tremolite skarns, metaquartzites, and chlorite veins. Due to its rare geologic occurrence much of experimental guyanaite is synthesized in a laboratory.

== Special characteristics ==
Guyanaite has never played a significant historical or political role in any way primarily due to its relative isolation, rarity and abundance in very insignificant amounts. As an ore it had unfavorable views on its economic value and potential due to its low abundance and as a result has never held any significant role in industry or commerce. Although recently there have been experiments aimed at incorporating chromium oxides such as guyanaite for cathode materials in rechargeable lithium batteries, as cells created with chromium oxides may give a more efficient charge-discharge process compared with current technology, although no mention is made of the economic viability of using guyanaite and its polymorphs as opposed to current technology.

== Geographic location ==
Guyanaite as well as its polymorphs were discovered first in deposits of the Merume River in what was British Guiana and is currently known as Guyana. It is found most abundantly in the upper branches of Director Creek which is a small tributary of the Merume River flowing into the Mazaruni River. The nearest populated area is a government rest-house and hydroplane stop called Kamakusa of which the Merumite area is roughly 10 mi (16 km) southwest. The largest strip of merumite in Guyana along the base of the Robello Ridge consisting of Roraima-like sandstones, conglomerates and volcanic ash with the entire deposit located within a low-lying swampy and forested terrain which is contained between scarps of the Roraima formation and extensive talus slopes. The relatively small area in which the minerals are found indicates a local origin as well as indications of mild hydrothermal activity within the surrounding ridge rocks. The only other significant source of guyanaite occurs in the Outokumpu mine in Finland and despite the fact that it is a copper ore mine there was an estimated seven-million tons of metallic chromium alongside the copper, serpentine, and skarn rocks found within the mine.
