= Imbaimadai =

Imbaimadai Inpɨimʉtɨi (Akawaio)
- Village
- Location in Guyana
- Coordinates: 5.69252°N 60.28198°W
- Country: Guyana
- Region: Cuyuni-Mazaruni
- Elevation: 1,650 ft (500 m)

Population (2012)
  - Total: 246

Imbaimadai (Akawaio: Inpɨimʉtɨi) is a community in the Cuyuni-Mazaruni Region of Guyana.

Imbaimadai is a mining community adjoining Amerindian lands. Imbaimadai is known for its gold, diamond and other precious mineral deposits. As of 2016, only 13 mines remained of which seven were operational. The miners wanted to open up new mines, however indigenous lands complicated the situation.

Imbaimadai is also known for its natural environment, mountains that are part of the Pakaraima range, its waterfalls and its forests.

The village is served by Imbaimadai Airport, and is situated at an elevation of 1,650 feet (500 m).
