= Waini River =

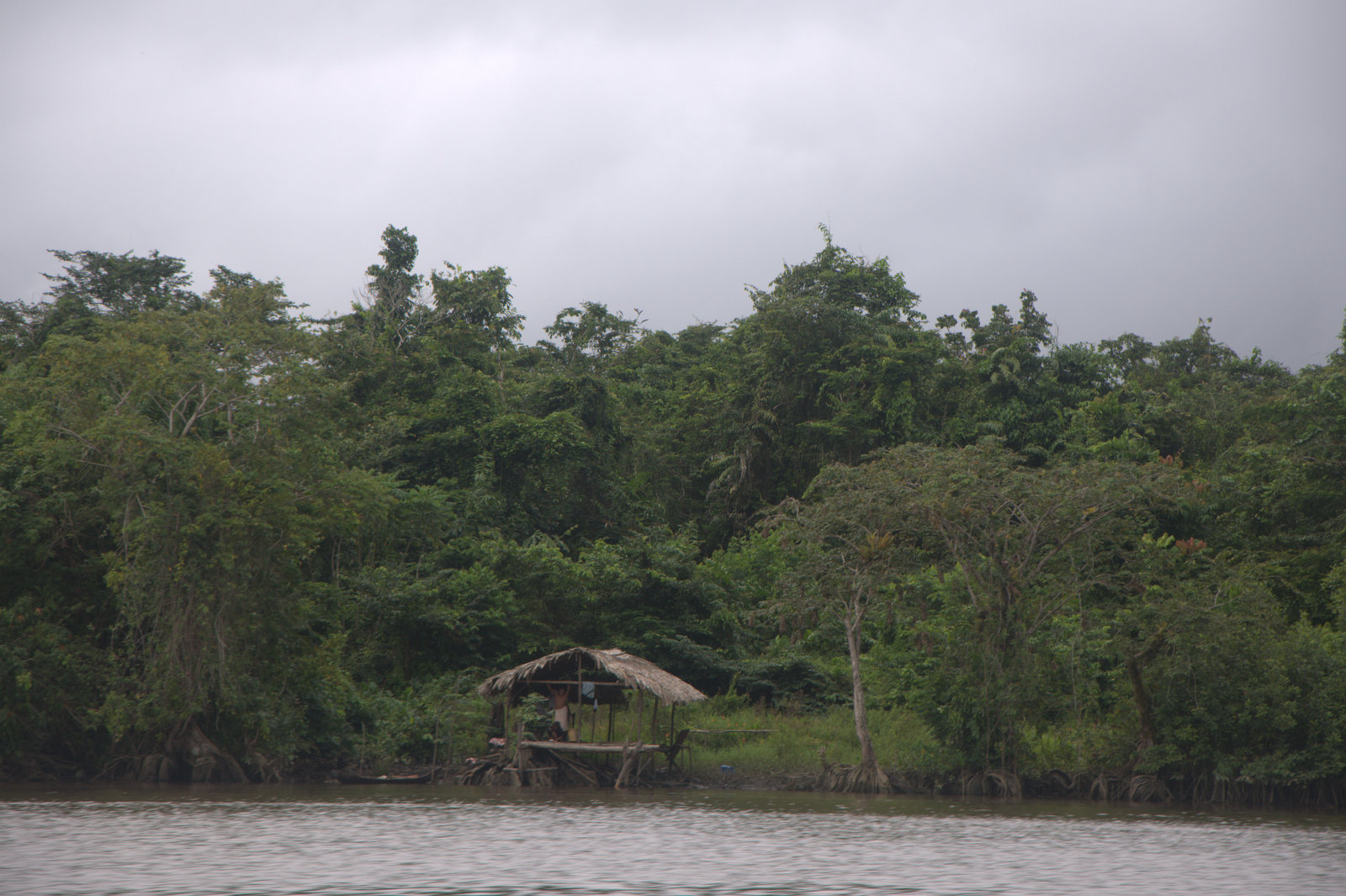

- Location of mouth

Location
- Country: Guyana
- Region: Barima-Waini

Physical characteristics
- Source
  - location
  - coordinates: 7°00′N 59°24′W
- Mouth: Atlantic Ocean
  - location: Waini Point
  - coordinates: 8°23′25″N 59°50′14″W
  - elevation: Sea level

Basin features
- Tributaries
  - left: "Left" is in the sense source to mouth but tributaries are listed mouth to source Mora Passage; Warapoko; Sabaina River; Arasika; Barama River (Village of Santa Cruz); Kumanaballi; Matorohana; Anaida; Arawatta; Ananu; Two Mouth; Ariaparu; Pelibelimba; Turubang; Yamira; Durabanna; Imotai; Kasipang; Source of Waini River.
  - right: "Right" is in the sense source to mouth but tributaries are listed mouth to source Thunder Creek; Kuberina; Mokaboina; Luri; Baramanni; Barukabaru; Kumaruwa; Kuniaballi (Village of Santa Cruz); Sirikata River; Kuiaru River; Mubohina River; Kwabanna; Kwassi; Anapari; Akabaru; Mariwaru; Urabubaru; Potawau; Turtle; Shararin; Arawapai; Source of Waini River.

The Waini River is a river in the Barima-Waini region of northern Guyana. It flows into the Atlantic Ocean. The upper portion of the river flows through the Guianian moist forests, while the lower Waini river flows through the eastern extent of the vast Orinoco Delta swamp forests before emptying into the sea.

== Features ==
Almond Beach has important nesting areas for leatherback, green, hawksbill and the olive ridley marine turtles.

There are three significant waterfalls along the Waini. The furthest up river is Kasatu Falls at 7.22366°N 59.3591°W.

Settlements along the river include Santa Cruz and Santa Rosa, an Amerindian community.

== See also ==
- List of rivers of Guyana
- List of rivers of the Americas by coastline
