= Puruni River =

Location
- Country: Guyana

Physical characteristics
- Mouth
  - coordinates: 6°00′N 59°12′W

The Puruni River (Spanish: Rio Carmen) is a river of Guyana in the Cuyuni-Mazaruni region.

In 2017, Ministry of Natural Resources issued five cease and desist orders against gold-mining dredges on the Puruni river. Gold mining is done on many waterways in the country, and the dredging process has had a detrimental impact on bio-diversity. The Guyana Human Rights Association, described the river as “a ruinous mess of tailings and devastation” for miles and unnavigable for large stretches. The remote area has very little oversight, so crime is a major problem around the mining camps, and many Brazilian miners also mine illegally.

Logging also takes place in the area surrounding the river.

== See also ==
- List of rivers of Guyana

== Bibliography ==
- Rand McNally, The New International Atlas, 1993.
