= Meamu River =

Coordinates: 6°21′N 60°22′W

Location
- Country: Guyana
- Region: Cuyuni-Mazaruni

The Meamu River is a river of Guyana.

== See also ==
- List of rivers of Guyana
