= Troy Resources =

Australian mining corporation

- Type: Public
- Industry: Mining
- Founded: 1984
- Key people: Ken Nilsson (deceased)
- Products: Gold
- Website: troyres.com.au

Troy Resources is an Australian mining corporation. It was publicly listed on the Australian Securities Exchange.

== History ==
The corporation was established in 1984. It was listed on the Australian Stock Exchange between 1987 and 2023. It started production and shortly after exploration in Southern Cross, Western Australia.

It operates a mine in Andorinhas in Para State, Brazil and Casposo in San Juan Province, Argentina. Additionally, it has a project in Guyana.

On 12 July 2013 it acquired Azimuth Resources.

It operates the Sandstone Gold Mine in Sandstone, Western Australia. Ref?
