= Eskolaite =

Chromium oxide mineral

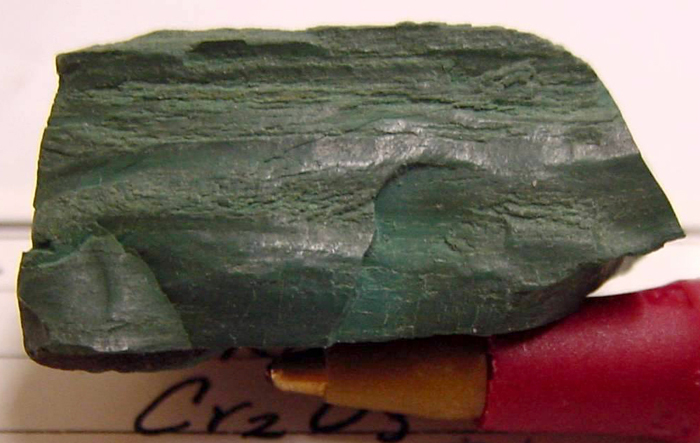
- Eskolaite from Russia

General
- Category: Oxide mineral
- Formula: Cr_{2}O_{3}
- IMA symbol: Esk
- Strunz classification: 4.CB.05
- Crystal system: Trigonal
- Crystal class: Hexagonal scalenohedral (3̅ m); H-M symbol: (3̅ 2/m)
- Space group: R3̅c, No. 167
- Unit cell: a = 4.95, c = 13.58 [Å]; Z = 6

Identification
- Color: Black to dark green
- Crystal habit: Hexagonal prisms and plates
- Cleavage: None
- Tenacity: Brittle
- Mohs scale hardness: 8 – 8.5
- Luster: Vitreous or metallic
- Streak: Pale green
- Diaphaneity: Opaque, translucent in thin edges
- Specific gravity: 5.18
- Density: Measured: 5.18 g/cm^{3}, Calculated: 5.20 g/cm^{3}
- Optical properties: Uniaxial
- Pleochroism: Noted; emerald-green to olive-green

Eskolaite is a rare chromium oxide mineral (chromium(III) oxide Cr_{2}O_{3}).

== Discovery and occurrence ==
It was first described in 1958 for an occurrence in the Outokumpu ore deposit of eastern Finland. It occurs in chromium bearing tremolite skarns, metamorphosed quartzites and chlorite bearing veins in Finland; in glacial boulder clays in Ireland and in stream pebbles in the Merume River of Guyana. It has also been recognized as a rare component in chondrite meteorites.

The mineral is named after the Finnish geologist Pentti Eskola (1883–1964).

== Structure and physical properties ==
Molar volume vs. pressure at room temperature.

Eskolaite crystallizes with trigonal symmetry in the space group R3̅c and has the lattice parameters a = 4.95 Å and c = 13.58 Å at standard conditions. The unit cell contains six formula units. The lattice is analogous to that of corundum, with Cr^{3+} replacing Al^{3+}.

== See also ==
- List of minerals named after people
