= Kamarang =

- Village
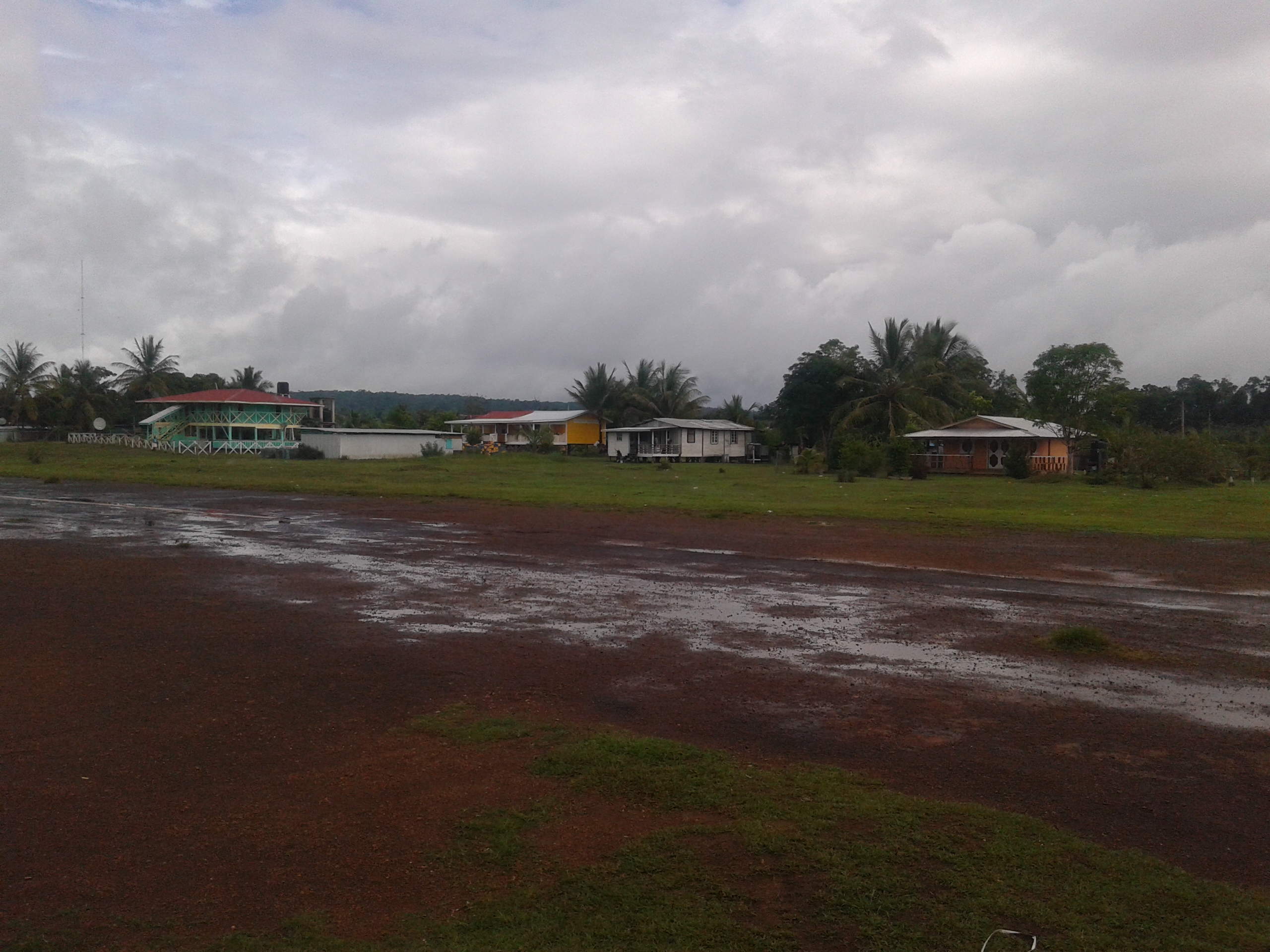
- Kamarang looking east

- Location in Guyana
- Coordinates: 5°51′55″N 60°36′51″W
- Country: Guyana
- Region: Cuyuni-Mazaruni

Government
  - Type: Village-Council

Population (2012)
  - Total: 347

Kamarang (Akawaio: Kamʉran) is an Amerindian village, standing at the confluence of the Kamarang River and Mazaruni River, in the Cuyuni-Mazaruni Region of Guyana.

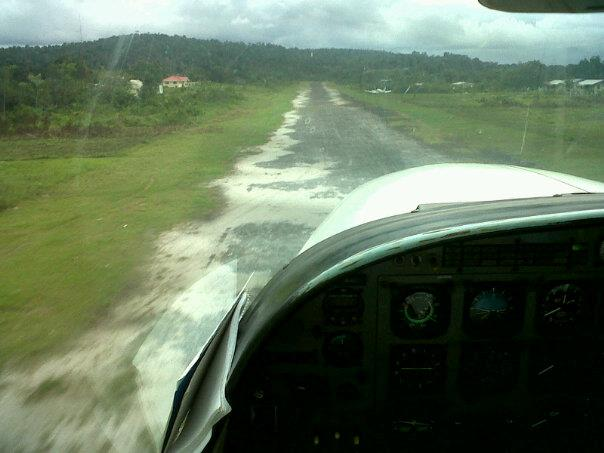
Approach of Kamarang airstrip.Taken from cockpit of Cessna 208 Caravan

Kamarang has a primary school, hospital, police station and can be accessed by air via the Kamarang Airport.

The village has seen extensive economic growth at the start of the 21st century because of gold and diamond mining; however, as of 2019, the output has started to decline. Its altitude is 490 metres (1601 feet).

== Demography ==
According to the 2002 population census, it had 349 inhabitants.

Type	Officials	Professionals and technicians	Clergy	Trade and Services	Agricultural activities	Industrial activities	Subsistence economy	S/D	Total
Population	4	5	0	50	4	4	77	77	243
%	1,71	4,94	3,15	23,51	1,67	5,61	15,88	43,90	100,00
