= Barama River =

Location
- Country: Guyana

Physical characteristics
- Source
  - location: 7°40′N 59°15′W
- Mouth
  - location: Waini River

The Barama River is a tributary of the Waini River, both being in the Barima-Waini administrative region of Guyana.

Settlements on the river include Kariaco (Kariako) and Chinese Landing. An airstrip (Yakishuri Aerodrome) was opened in 2011 to provide access to the area.

Gold mining is common in the area, and Barama's banks are dredged to extract gold. Logging is also present in the area.

== See also ==
- List of rivers of Guyana
