= Kurupung =

Mining community in the Cuyuni-Mazaruni Region of Guyana, near the Pakaraima Mountains

- Village
- Location in Guyana
- Coordinates: 6°28′0″N 59°10′0″W
- Country: Guyana
- Region: Cuyuni-Mazaruni

Population (2012)
  - Total: 128

Kurupung is a mining community in the Cuyuni-Mazaruni Region of Guyana, near the Pakaraima Mountains.

Kurupung has two airstrips (one at the top of the mountain and one at the bottom of the mountain) (Airport code KPG), a police station, a health unit, and a sub-office of the Elections Commission. Children attend school in other villages.

The Kurupung River is a famous gold mining location associated with the community.
