= Kamarang River =

River in Venezuela and Guyana

Coordinates: 5°52′00″N 60°36′00″W

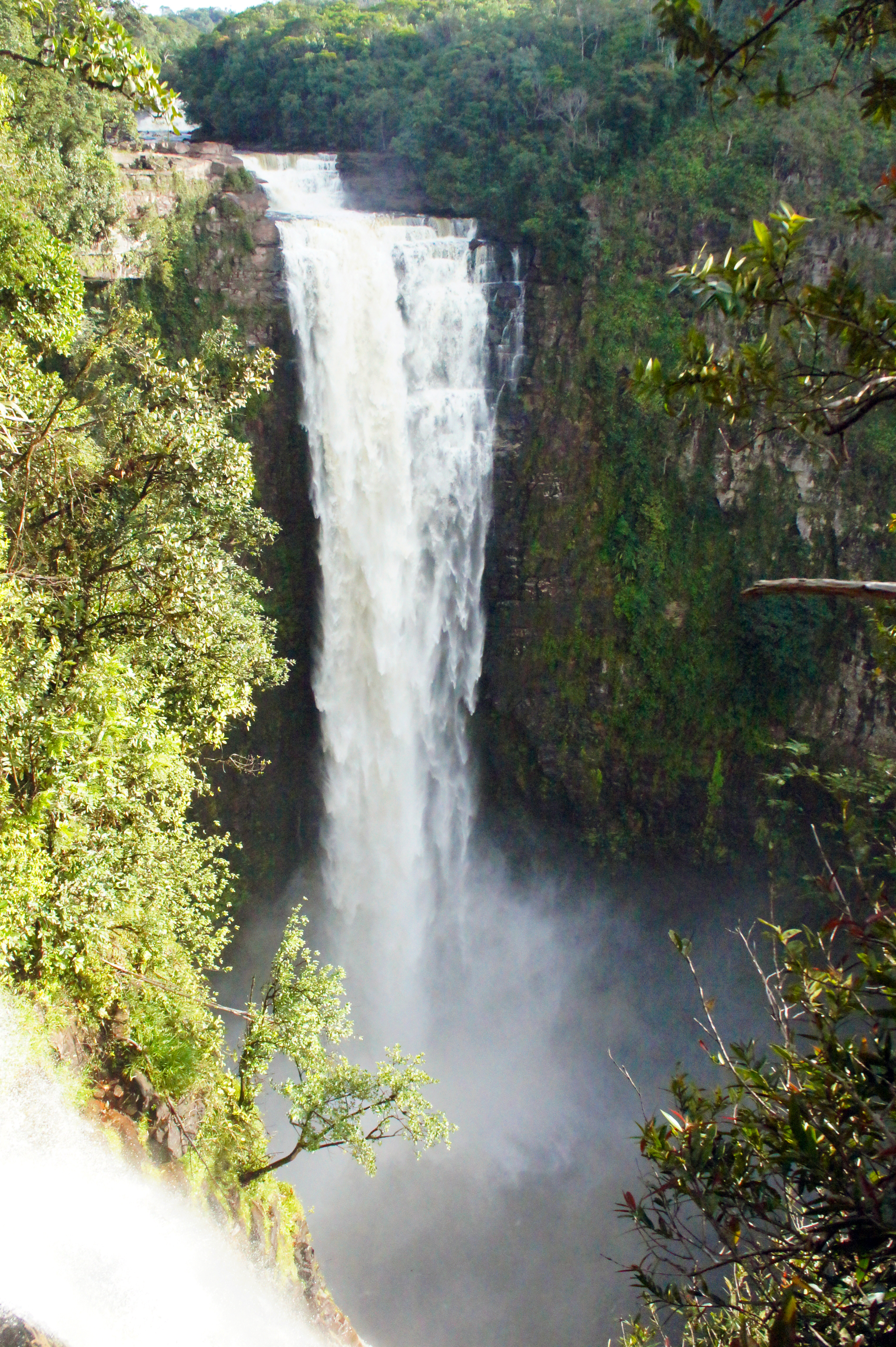

Location
- Country: Guyana, Venezuela

Physical characteristics
- Source
  - elevation: 1,350 m (4,430 ft)
- Mouth
  - location: Mazaruni River
  - elevation: 480 m (1,570 ft)

Basin features
- Progression: Mazaruni → Essequibo → Atlantic Ocean
- River system: Essequibo Basin
- Waterfalls: Kamarang Great Falls

Kamarang River is a river in Guyana and Venezuela, and a part of the Essequibo River basin.

== Route ==
The river originates in Venezuela where it is called Río Camarán or Río Camurán. Its source is located right next to the Troncal 10, in the middle of the Gran Sabana region. The nascent river first flows in parallel to the road in a southeasterly direction. It then passes the road a few meters after the Campamento Kamoiran. Here the river forms the Kamoiran rapids. Its course then turns more eastward for several kilometers through open Savannah. Shortly after entering the disputed territory administered by Guyana, the river drops roughly 160 meters at the impressive Kamarang falls creating a 40 meter wide water curtain.

The Kamarang River then flows through a deep forested gorge first north-, then eastbound. This area is very remote and inhabited by the Arecuna people and rarely visited as it is difficult to access from both Guyana and Venezuela. The river then flows east through the forest until meeting the Mazaruni River at the mining village of Kamarang.

== Falls ==
Kamarang Great Falls, also known as Kamarang Meru, plunges off the Pacaraima Mountains escarpment in an isolated western corner of Guyana only few kilometers from the Venezuelan border. Its height is 145 meters. By its volume Kamarang Great Falls is one of the most powerful waterfalls in the country.

The falls were reportedly discovered in 1938 by American entomologist and physician Paul A. Zahl, who wrote that the noise created by the falling water was deafening already before the falls were visible.

== See also ==
- List of rivers of Guyana
- List of rivers of Venezuela

== Bibliography ==
- Rand McNally, The New International Atlas, 1993.
