= Cuyuní River =

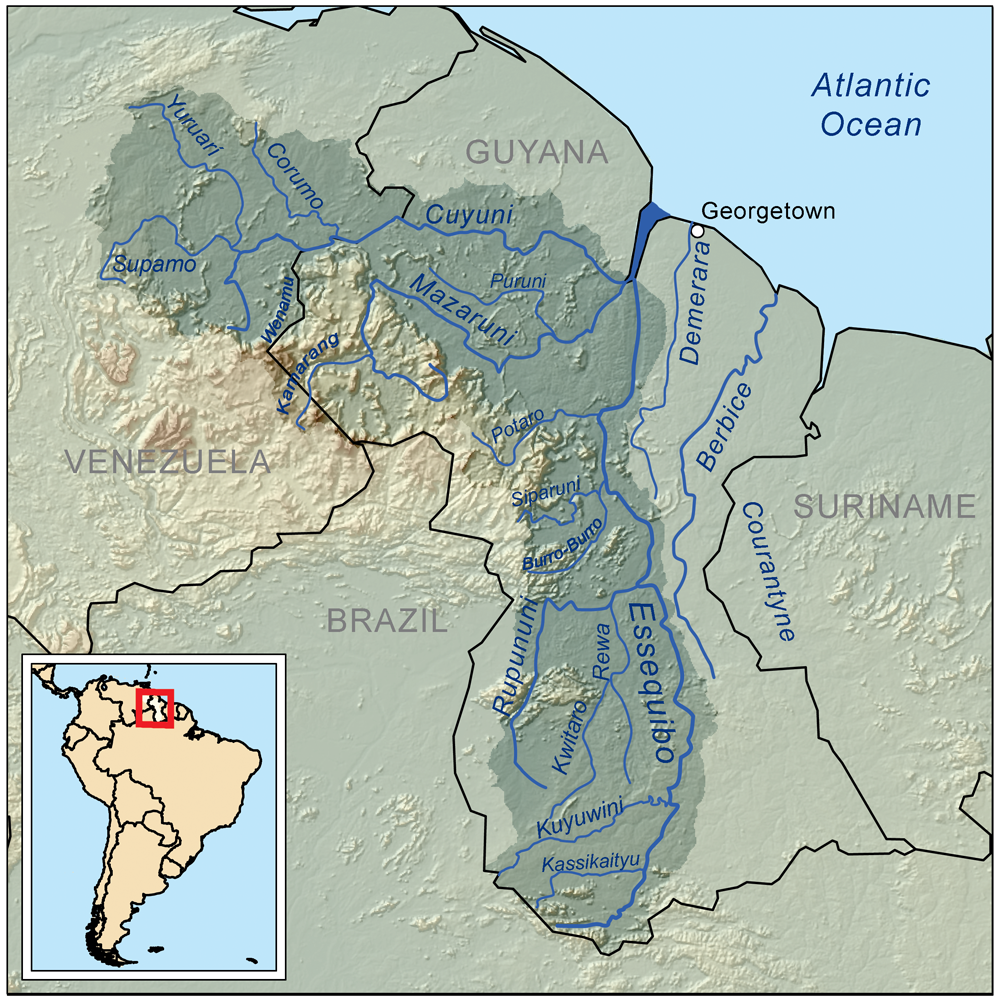

Location
- Country: Venezuela and Guyana

Physical characteristics
- Source
  - location: Guiana Highlands, Venezuela
  - coordinates: 6°2′5.0316″N 61°36′34.1388″W
  - elevation: 399 m (1,309 ft)
- Mouth: Essequibo
  - location: Bartica, Guyana
  - coordinates: 6°24′28″N 58°37′18″W
  - elevation: 1 m (3 ft 3 in)
- Length: 618 km (384 mi)
- Basin size: 85,635 km^{2} (33,064 sq mi)
- Discharge
  - location: Bartica, Guyana (near mouth)
  - average: 85.808 km^{3}/a (2,719.1 m^{3}/s) (Period: 1971–2000)2,674.2 m^{3}/s (94,440 cu ft/s)
- Discharge
  - location: Kamaria Falls (Basin size: 53,354 km^{2} (20,600 sq mi)
  - average: 1,360 m^{3}/s (48,000 cu ft/s)
- Discharge
  - location: Anacoco
  - average: 719.5 m^{3}/s (25,410 cu ft/s)
- Discharge
  - location: El Dorado, Venezuela
  - average: (Period: 1971–2000)503.8 m^{3}/s (17,790 cu ft/s)

Basin features
- Progression: Essequibo → Atlantic Ocean
- Tributaries
  - left: Yuruarí, Corumpo
  - right: Wenamu, Mazaruni

The Cuyuní River is a South American river and a tributary of the Essequibo River.

The Cuyuní River marks a border in the Guyana–Venezuela territorial dispute for approximately 100 kilometres (62 mi).

Makarapan Mountain is a sandstone range by the Cuyuní.

== History ==
On January 2, 1895, the "incident of the Cuyuní River", so named by the general Domingo Antonio Sifontes, was an armed confrontation between Venezuelans and British in the region of the river over the territorial dispute between Venezuela and British Guyana, which under Sifontes the Venezuelans left winners.

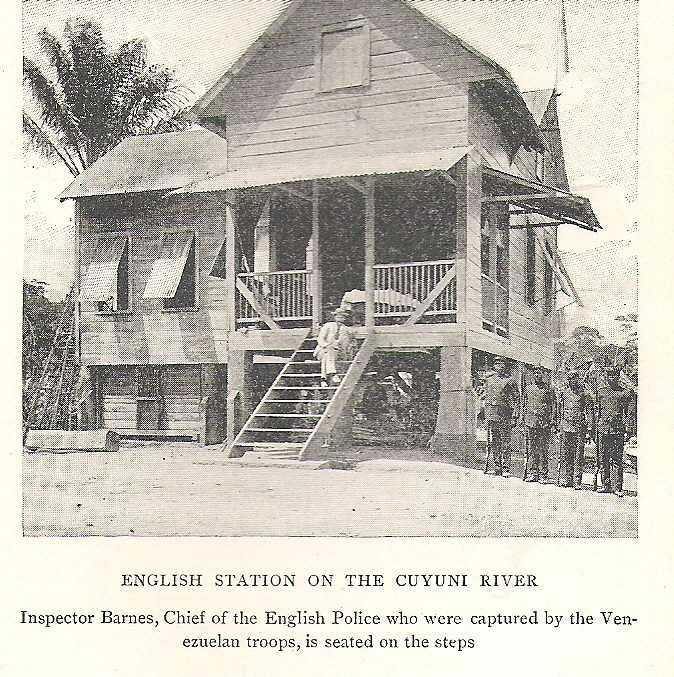
Inspector Douglas D. Barnes in the Venezuelan station.

At dawn, British policemen led by an Inspector Barnes of England took an unoccupied military station of Venezuelan nationality, located on the left bank of the river. Barnes' men hoisted the British flag during the day.

Captain Andrés Avelino Domínguez, second in command of Sifontes, was sent to recover the settlement. The result was the withdrawal of the British and the capture of Barnes and his men, who were taken to the General Police Station, which increased tensions between the two countries amid an internal crisis in Venezuela.

== Settlement ==
The river is a source of alluvial gold and attracts mining in the form of dredging. Illegal mining also occurs on the river banks, and mining also has exacerbated the border issue between Guyana and Venezuela.

Large-scale mining operation Aurora gold mine is on the Cuyuní River.

Development of a hydroelectric power site is under consideration at Kamaria on the Cuyuní River.

=== Venezuela ===
El Dorado is a Venezuelan settlement on the Cuyuní River.

=== Guyana ===
Some of the Kali'na people live in the Cuyuní River valley, part of which is in Guyana.

Eteringbang is a border settlement with an airstrip. Saint Martin and Ankoko Island have been the subject of further disputes between Venezuela and Guyana. In 2015, GDF forces continued observation from Eteringbang and Kaikan and other points along the river.

The town of Bartica is close to the mouth of the Cuyuní, where it meets with the confluence of Essequibo and Mazaruni rivers.

== See also ==
- Guyana–Venezuela territorial dispute
- Venezuela
