= Wenamu River =

River in Venezuela and Guyana

Coordinates: 6°43′N 61°07′W

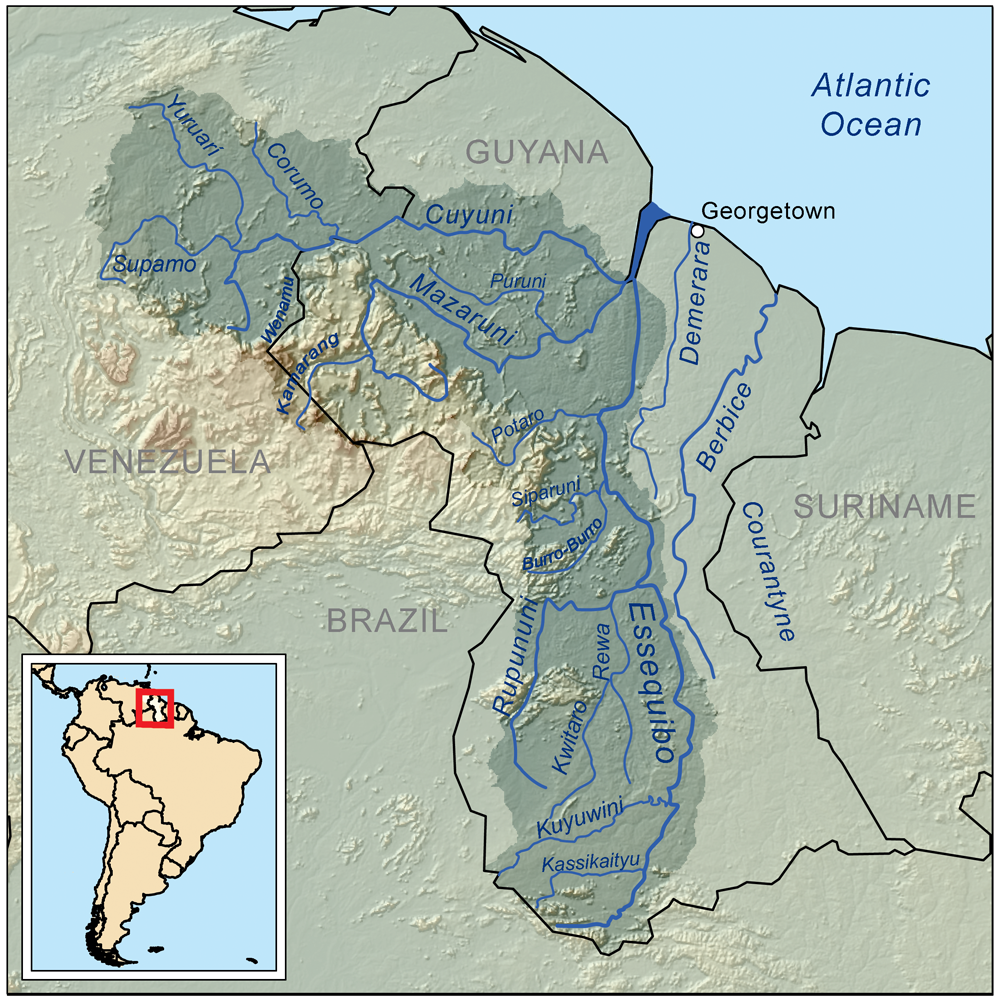

Location
- Countries: Venezuela; Guyana

Physical characteristics
- Mouth
  - location: Cuyuní River

Basin features
- Progression: Cuyuní → Essequibo → Atlantic Ocean

Wenamu River (Venamo River; Akawaio: Wenamu) is a river in South America. It forms a portion of the international boundary between Venezuela and Guyana. It is part of the Essequibo River basin.

Mango Landing is a small settlement on the Guyana side of the Wanamu River. Other settlements include Arau and Kaikan (Akawaio: Kaiꞌkan). There is an airstrip that mostly serves miners working in the area.

The Wenamu has been a part of the long territorial dispute between Guyana and Venezuela. In 2007, Venezuelan troops used C-4 (explosive) to destroy mining dredges illegally in their territory. The Wenamu is also a crossing point for Venezuelan refugees entering Guyana.

== See also ==
- List of rivers of Venezuela
- Mount Venamo
- Ankoko Island

== Bibliography ==
- Rand McNally, The New International Atlas, 1993.
