= Mazaruni River =

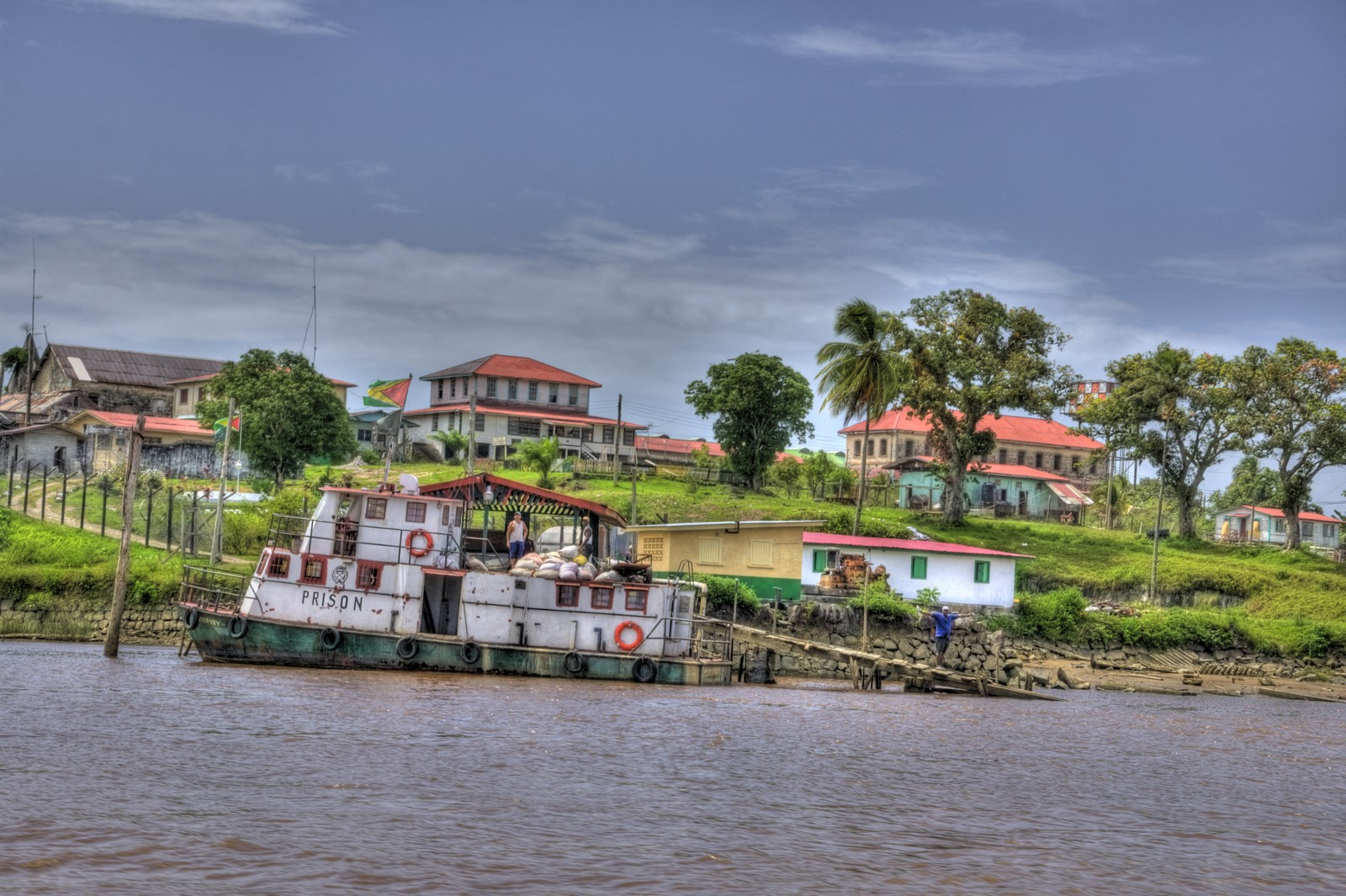
- Native name: Masurin (Akawaio)

Location
- Country: Guyana

Physical characteristics
- Source
  - location: Pakaraima Mountains, Guyana
  - coordinates: 5°36′50.22″N 59°57′19.4292″W
  - elevation: 870 m (2,850 ft)
- Mouth: Cuyuni
  - coordinates: 6°22′50.4264″N 58°41′6.0612″W
  - elevation: 1 m (3 ft 3 in)
- Length: 630 km (390 mi)
- Basin size: 31,704.8 km^{2} (12,241.3 sq mi)
- Discharge
  - location: Near mouth
  - average: (Period: 1971–2000)1,398.7 m^{3}/s (49,390 cu ft/s)

Basin features
- Progression: Cuyuni → Essequibo → Atlantic Ocean
- Tributaries
  - left: Haieka, Kako, Kukui, Kamarang, Puruni
  - right: Kurupung, Merume, Karanang, Semang, Issano, Kaburi

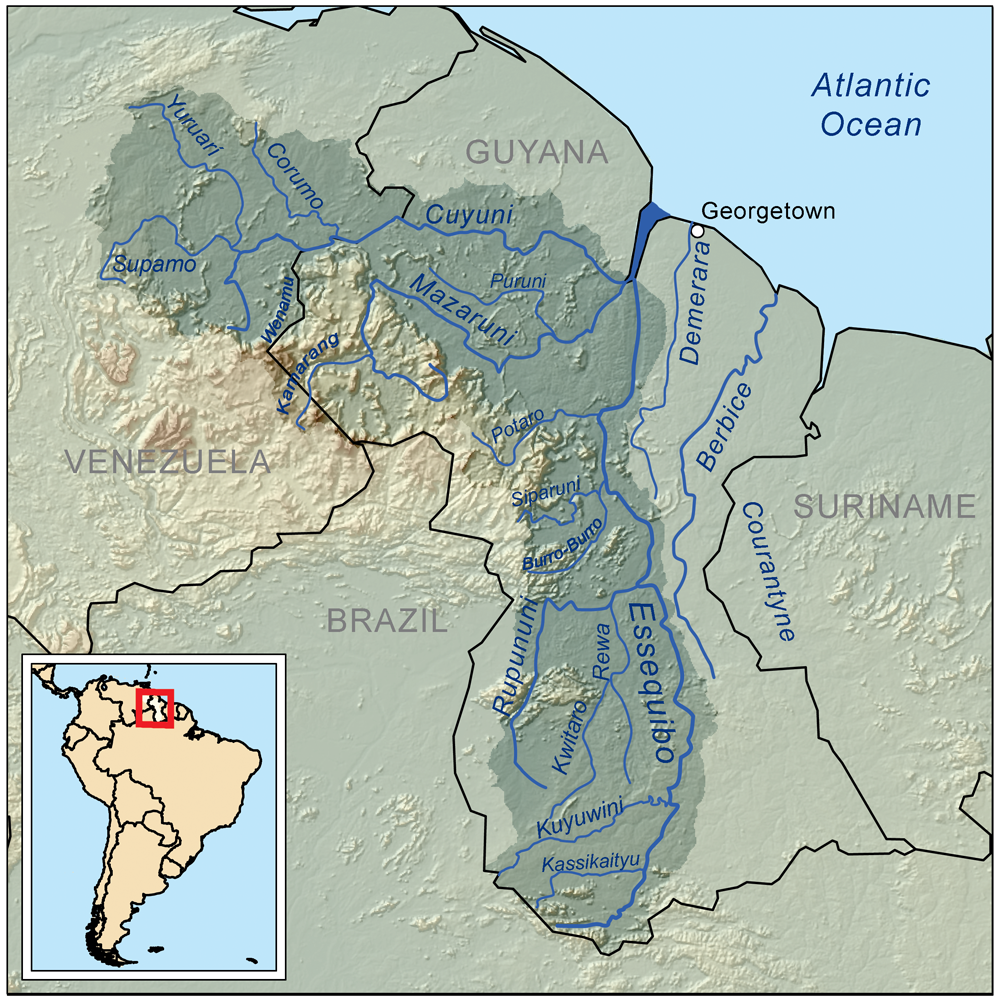
Map of the Essequibo drainage basin with the Mazaruni just above center

The Mazaruni River (Akawaio: Masurin) is a tributary of the Essequibo River in northern Guyana. Its source is in the remote western forests of the Pakaraima Mountains and its confluence with the Cuyuni River is near Bartica. As it descends from the Guiana Highlands the river runs south-east, past Issano, then northward to Bartica. The river is a source of alluvial gold.

== Sources ==
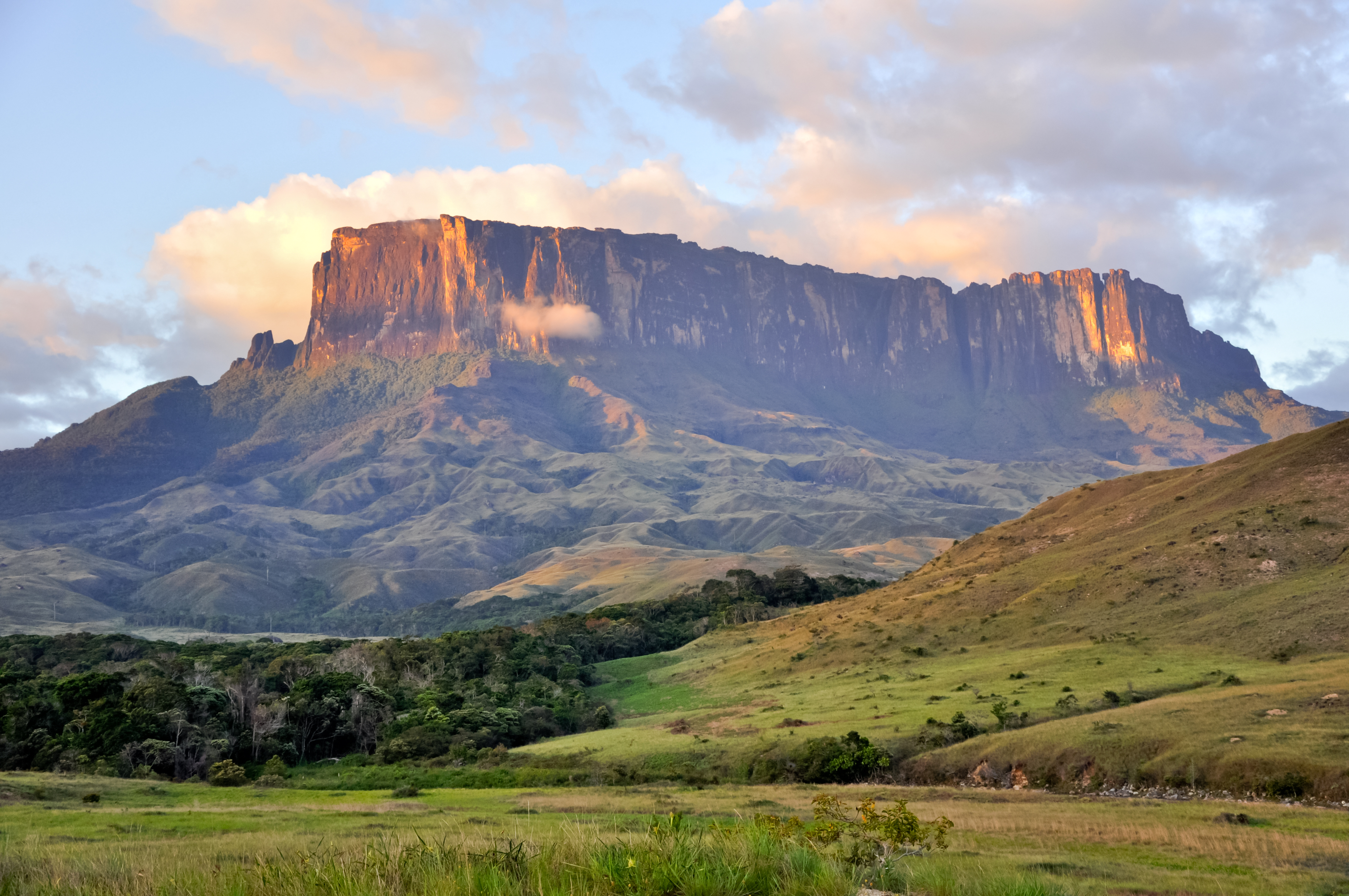
Roraima Plateau is the source of the river

The river takes source in the Roraima Plateau, three levels of sandstones and conglomerates, crowned by Mt. Roraima (2,810 m (9,220 feet)). In Guyana, the two highest levels of the Roraima Plateau are known as Pakaraima Mountains and Merume Mountains. The source of the Mazarunu River is in the Merume Mountains. The area is one of the very few places in the world still inaccessible. In 1992, a joint expedition of the Guyana Defence Force and Welsh Guards members was unable to reach the source of Mazaruni River, even with training, finances and equipment.

== Course ==
The river drops down from each Roraima plateau through three steep sided canyons with many picturesque sets of falls. The first set is Chai-chai Falls. The next is near village of Imbaimadai and the last set is below the village of Kamarang where the Mazaruni River tumbles through last few major falls, the first of which is a few kilometres long gutter known as Chitigokein Falls, which finishes in Coffy pool, a deep pool named after Mehir "Cousin Body" Coffy, one of the last pork-knockers (small-scale diamond and gold miners) of Guyana. The term "Porknockers" comes from the old prospectors having to carry in all their food one of which was salt pork which attracted flies and had to be knocked regularly to keep flies away. According to legend, during the 1950s, Coffy was diving in the river for diamonds when he got the bends, due to overstaying below and rapid decompression.

After few kilometres of relatively calm water, the last set of great Mazaruni River Falls begin. The first falls is the Aruwai Falls and the last is the Peaima Falls.

Soon after Peaima Falls, the river, which was flowing north–south, turns east-south-east. It passes the Isseneru River mouth on the left bank, with the Amerindian village, Isseneru, on the other bank. Then, over the lowlands of greenstones of Precambrian Guiana Shield, the Meamu River, Kurupung River and Eping River join the Mazaruni River. Together, these rivers serve to drain the highlands of the Merume Mountains.

Next, the Mazaruni River flows past Oranapai Rapids, Kamakusa Landing, the mouth of Merume River, Banana Landing, Tiboku Rapids, the mouth of Equeribisi River, Issano Landing, the mouth of the Puruni River, Kaburi rapids, Marshal Falls, the last set of rapids, Itabali Landing, the mouth of the Cuyuni River, then, near the village of Bartica, finishes into the Essequibo River, the largest river of Guyana.

== Fauna ==
The iron hydroxide stained brown waters of Mazaruni are home to many fish. The most abundant are the large and dangerous black electric eels (numfish), piry (relative of piranha cutleback), haimara, and baiara. However, the most famous fish is lau-lau, with specimens weighing up to 200 kg (440 pounds). Lau-lau lives in deep pools of Mazaruni River hunting in the night. The waters are also home to a largest water snake, that is anaconda, locally known as the "water kamudi." Large herds of peccaries which sometimes number into the hundreds, live on swampy flat of the river. Pumas and the much smaller ocelot are also found there but rarely seen since they hunt at night. Many monkeys, of which the howling monkey is the noisiest, inhabit tree tops, sharing the space with many types of birds. Pairs of red, yellow or bleu Macaws, united for life, often can be seen to fly by.

In 2015, a jaguar attacked a three-year-old indigenous girl near the river, in Cuyuni-Mazaruni. She nevertheless survived.

== Flora ==
The Mazaruni River flows over three distinct habitats; the flat tops of Roraima Plateau, known in Venezuela as “tepuis”, the lower two plateaus and the low lands. Each habitat is characterised by its own vegetation. The upper one is a fantastic land of rain swept sandstone eroded into fantastic forms with exotic plants trying to survive this inhospitable land of denuded rocks. The middle one is mainly savannas with bands of single canopy jungle, the lowest is a triple canopy jungle. Exotic orchids are found in last two habitats.

== Mineral resources ==
In the upper Mazaruni River basin, in 1890, near Isseneru village, first alluvial diamonds were found in Guyana. The discovery was made accidentally by Edward Gilkes, was prospecting for gold along the Putareng Creek, a small left hand tributary of the Mazaruni River. Since then, according to Guyana Geology and Mines Commission, Mazaruni River, along with its tributaries (Meamu, Kurupung and Eping Rivers), produced over 50 percent all of alluvial diamonds mined up to now in Guyana.

The gravels of Mazaruni River and its tributaries are, as well, gold bearing. Some places, such as Imbaimadai, Kamarang, Aruwai, Tiboku, Kaburi and Marshal Falls produced a large amount of alluvial gold during golden era of river dredging (1980–1995).

The river remains, to a lesser degree, a source of alluvial gold and diamonds. A few miles west of Bartica, there was an unsuccessful attempt to establish a hard-rock gold mine in 1888.

== See also ==
- South America
