= Kapóng language =

Cariban language spoken in Guyana and Venezuela

Kapóng
- Native to: Guyana, Venezuela
- Ethnicity: Akawaio, Patamona
- Native speakers: (10,000 cited 1990–2002)
- Language family: Cariban: Venezuelan Carib; Pemóng–Panare; Pemóng; Kapóng

Language codes
- ISO 639-3: Either: ake – Akawaio pbc – Patamona
- Glottolog: kapo1251
- ELP: Kapong
- Linguasphere: 80-AFA-c
- Akawaio in Guyana and Venezuela is classified as Definitely Endangered by the UNESCO Atlas of the World's Languages in Danger. Akawaio in Brazil and Patamona are classified as Vulnerable by the UNESCO Atlas of the World's Languages in Danger.

Kapóng is a Cariban language spoken mainly in Guyana, most commonly in the region of the Upper Mazaruni. Though many speakers do not live in villages, there are a number of population centers, notably Kamarang, Jawalla, Waramadong, and Kako. There are two dialects, Akawaio and Patamona.

The Macushi name of the language is Ingarikó.

== History ==
The Carib tribes practice an Indigenous system of beliefs, one that dates back to the 16th century. It was not until the 19th century that attempts were made to understand the beliefs and practices of this tribe. Much of the Kapóng language refers back to sun worship and sun spirits, which is reflective of the beliefs system of these Carib-speaking tribes. Literature has also found belief in a higher being in the sky among the Carib tribes in Guyana.

== Geographic distribution ==
The Kapóng language is found to be spoken in lowland tropical South America, particularly in the countries of Guyana, Brazil, and Venezuela.

In Guyana, Kapóng is spoken in forests by the Mazaruni River Basin. In 2013, a survey by the Inter-American Development Bank identified 20% fluency among Akawaio, which was the highest fluency rate among all sampled Indigenous groups in Guyana. However, no Indigenous language was in use by the Guyanese Patamona people in the survey.

The number of speakers in Brazil is about 10,000, and the transmission of language in Brazil is deemed to be of good standing. Speakers in Brazil are found in the Roraima Indigenous Terra Raposa.

In Venezuela, Kapóng is spoken in the states of Bolivar and Monagas.

== Dialects/Varieties ==
Kapóng has three dialects, which are:

- Akawaio (Akawayo)
- Ingarikó (Ingaricó)
- Patamona

== Phonology ==
=== Consonants ===
| | | Bilabial | Alveolar | Palatal | Velar |
|---|---|---|---|---|---|
| Plosive | voiceless | p | t | | k |
| Plosive | voiced | b | d | | g |
| Fricative | voiceless | | s | | |
| Fricative | voiced | | z | | |
| Nasal | | m | n | | |
| Flap | | | ɾ | | |
| Semivowel | | | | j | w |

The allophones of /k s n/ are [ʔ tʃ ŋ], as well as the allophones of /z/ being [ʃ ʒ dʒ].

=== Vowels ===
| | Front | Central | Back |
|---|---|---|---|
| Close | i | ɨ | u |
| Close-mid | e | ʌ | o |
| Open | | a | |

== Orthography ==
=== Vowels and diphthongs ===
- a - [a]
- e - [ɛ/e]
- i - [i]
- ï - [ɨ]
- o - [o/ɔ]
- ö - [ʌ]
- u - [u]
- ai - [aj]
- au - [aw]
- ei - [ej]
- oi - [ɔj]

=== Consonants ===
- b - [b]
- ch - [t͡ʃ]
- d - [d]
- g - [g]
- j - [d͡ʒ] ~ [ʒ]
- k - [k]
- m - [m]
- n - [n]
- ñ - [ɲ]
- ng - [ŋ]
- p - [p]
- r - [ɺ]
- s - [s]
- sh - [ʃ]
- t - [t]
- w - [w]
- y - [j]
- z - [z]
- ' - [ʔ]

== Morphology ==
yamok (aemvk) is an ending used to make words plural. (i.e.) Adding yamok to "Kapong" makes "Kapong" plural; Kapong yamok.

-da is a marker used to mark possession. (i.e.) kaata = book; da kaata = my book.

The preferred word order of Kapóng is subject-object-verb, for example:

Walawokyamàkuya molok yachi
boys-PL fish catch
"The boys catch fish"

However, the word order is flexible and there are cases where the object precedes the subject in sentences. Such as:

Kanau ikuurabök mang
boat {he paddling} is
"He is paddling the boat"

There are no gender distinctions found in Kapóng, as there are no differences in personal pronoun systems and affixes to indicate genders of nouns.

Similes are often used in writing, as many words in this language allow this to occur. Through the use of suffixes, many words can be converted into similes. Examples are as follows:

- -kasa = 'like'
- -walai = 'similar to'

== Vocabulary ==
Much of the Kapóng language has emphasis on a higher spirit/god up in the sky, and this is reflected in the vocabulary in this language.

- Kapóng = Sky People
- akwalo = the spirit
- akwa = God's place
- Waica = warrior
- Taemogoli = grandfather
- Kapo = in the sky
- Iopotari akuru = chief spirit
