= Cuyuni-Mazaruni =

Region of Guyana

Coordinates: 6.459522°N 60.211075°W

Cuyuni-Mazaruni Region 7
- Administrative Region
- Flag

- Map of Guyana showing Cuyuni-Mazaruni region
- Country: Guyana
- Regional Capital: Bartica

Area
  - Total: 47,213 km^{2} (18,229 sq mi)

Population (2022 census)
  - Total: 30,324
  - Density: 0.64228/km^{2} (1.6635/sq mi)

Cuyuni-Mazaruni (Region 7) is a region of Guyana. Its capital is Bartica. Located along the Guyana's border with Venezuela, it is situated along the Pakaraima mountain range. Spread over an area of 47,213 km^{2} (18,229 sq mi), it is the second largest region by area in Guyana. As per the 2022 census, it had a population of 30,324 inhabitants. The major economic activities include timber logging, agriculture, and gold and diamond mining.

== Geography ==
Cuyuni-Mazaruni (Region 7) is one of the ten administrative regions of Guyana. It is located between the Essequibo River and Guyana's international border with Venezuela. It is spread over an area of 47,213 km^{2} (18,229 sq mi), and is the second largest of the ten regions of Guyana by area. The region was established during the 1980 administrative reform of Guyana consisting of most of the area that was previously part of the Mazaruni-Potaro district.

The topography consists of mostly forested lands with patches of clay and sandy hills. The Pakaraima mountain range lies along the region with the major peaks at Mount Ayanganna, and Mount Roraima. Roraima, standing 2,810 m (9,220 ft)-tall, is located at the tri-junction of Brazil, Guyana, and Venezuela. The region has about 4.5 million hectares of forested area, covering almost 95% of its land area.

Fort Kyk-Over-Al was a Dutch Fort constructed in the year 1616 at the intersection of the Essequibo, Cuyuni and Mazaruni Rivers, and earlier served as the administrative centre of the region. The major settlements in the region include:Agatash, Bartica, Imbaimadai, Issano, Isseneru, Kamarang, Kartabo, Kurupung, and Paruima. Its capital is at Bartica.

Located at an elevation of 153.14 m (502.4 ft) above sea level, the district has a tropical rainforest climate (Köppen climate classification: Af). The average annual temperature is 24.35 °C (75.83 °F). The district receives an average annual rainfall of 13.3 cm (5.2 in) and has 248.4 average rainy days in a year.

=== Dispute with Venezuela ===
Venezuela claims the Essequibo region, which is situated west of the Essequibo River, as a part of its territory. The status of the border controversy is subject to the Geneva Agreement, which was signed by the United Kingdom, Venezuela and British Guiana on 17 February 1966. As of December 2020, the matter is being addressed by the International Court of Justice.

== Demographics and economy ==
As per the official census in 1980, the region had a population of 14,390 inhabitants. It increased to 14,794 and 17,597 in the 1991 and 2002 census respectively. As per the 2022 census, it had a population of 30,224 inhabitants.

The major economic activities include timber logging, agriculture, and gold and diamond mining.

== Gallery ==
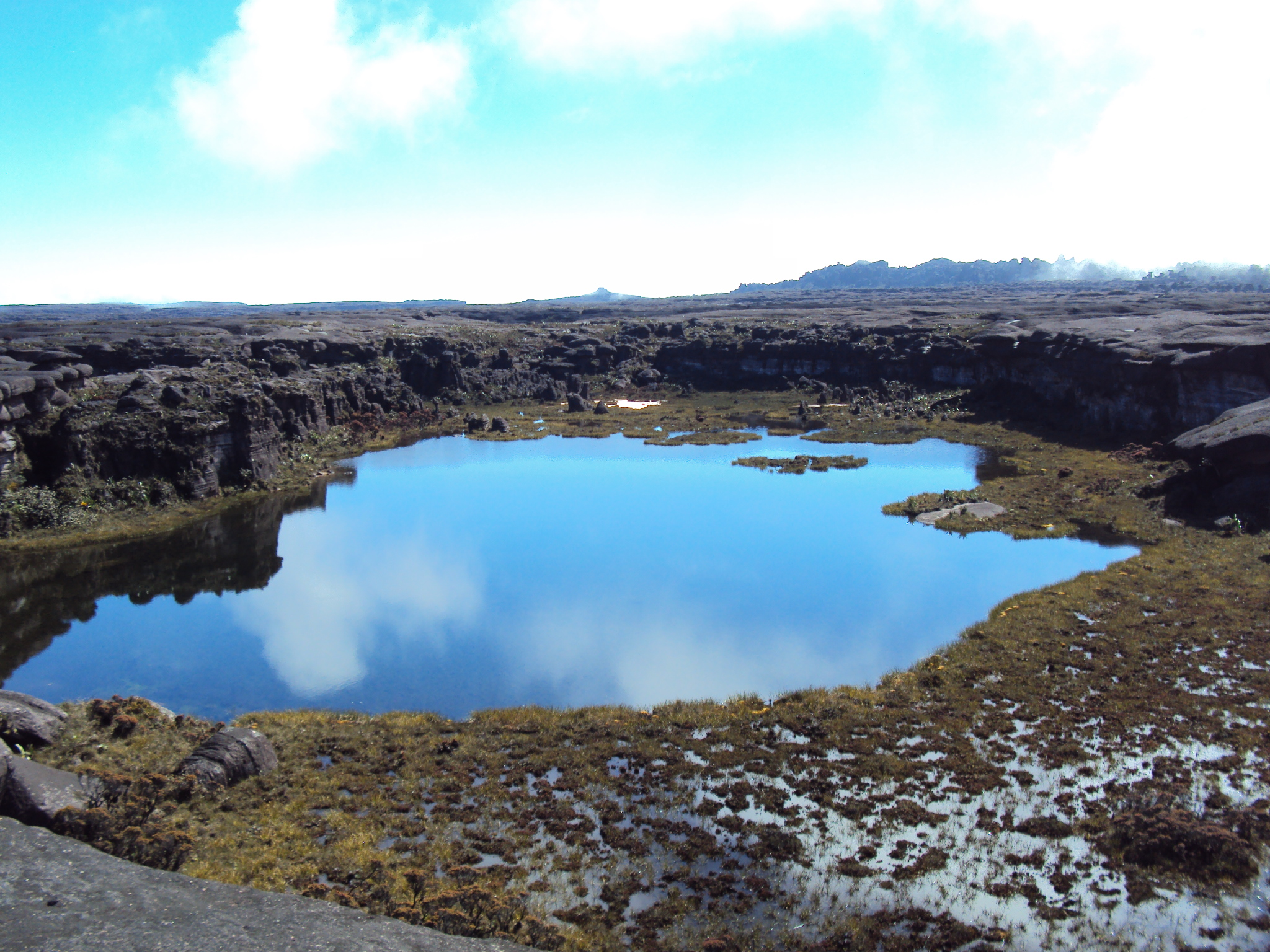
Gladys Lake

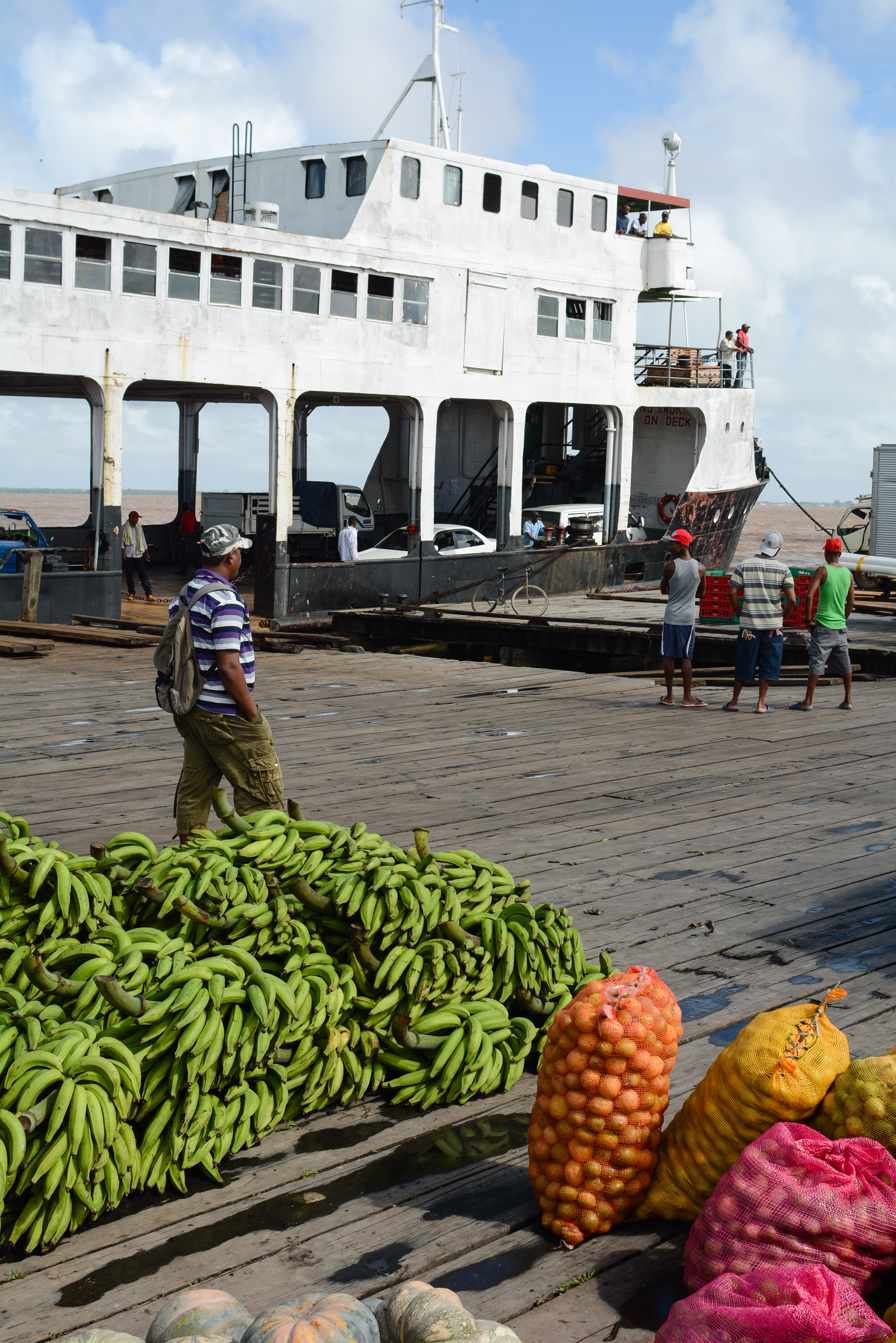
Bartica

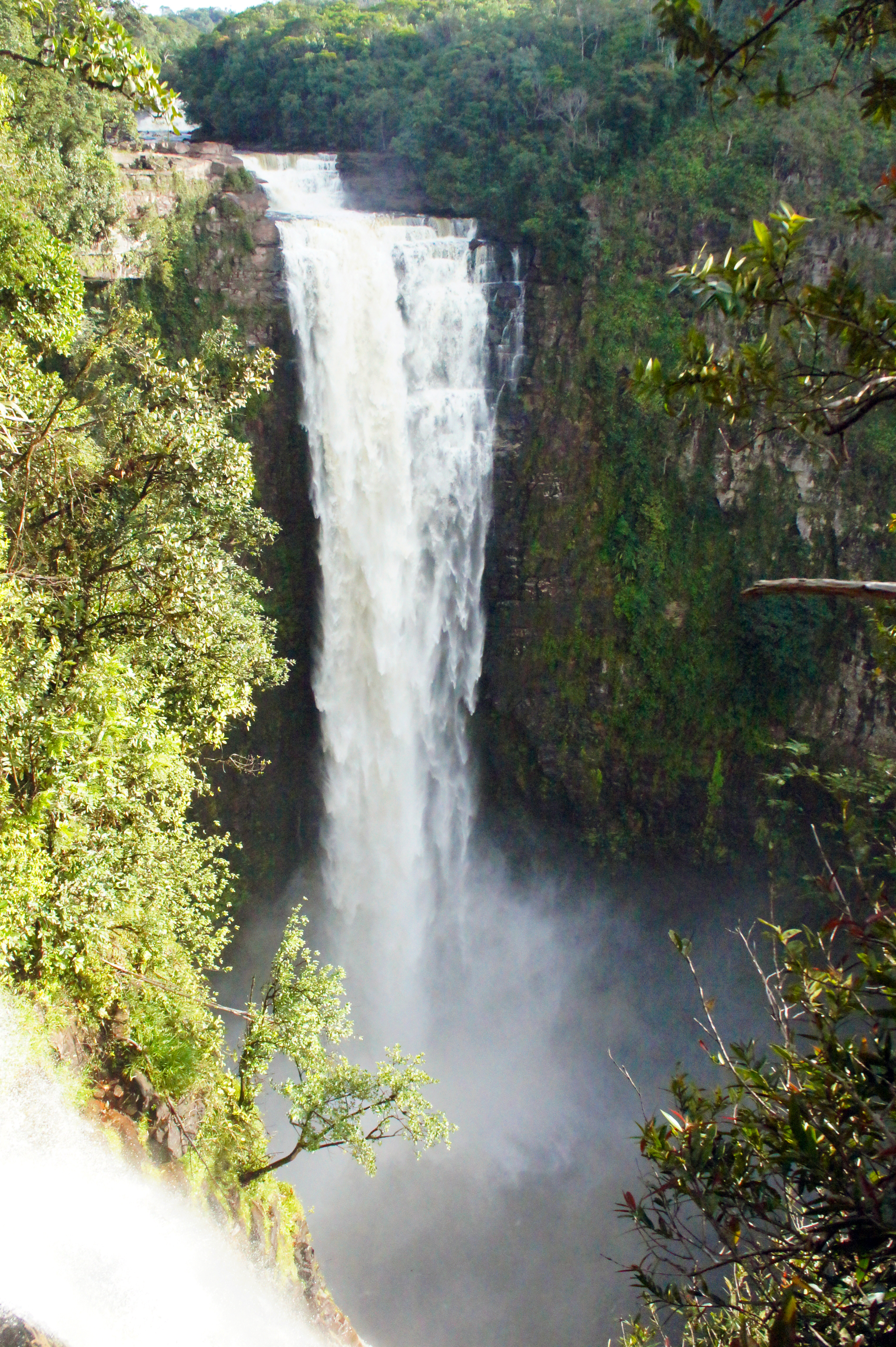
Kamarang Falls

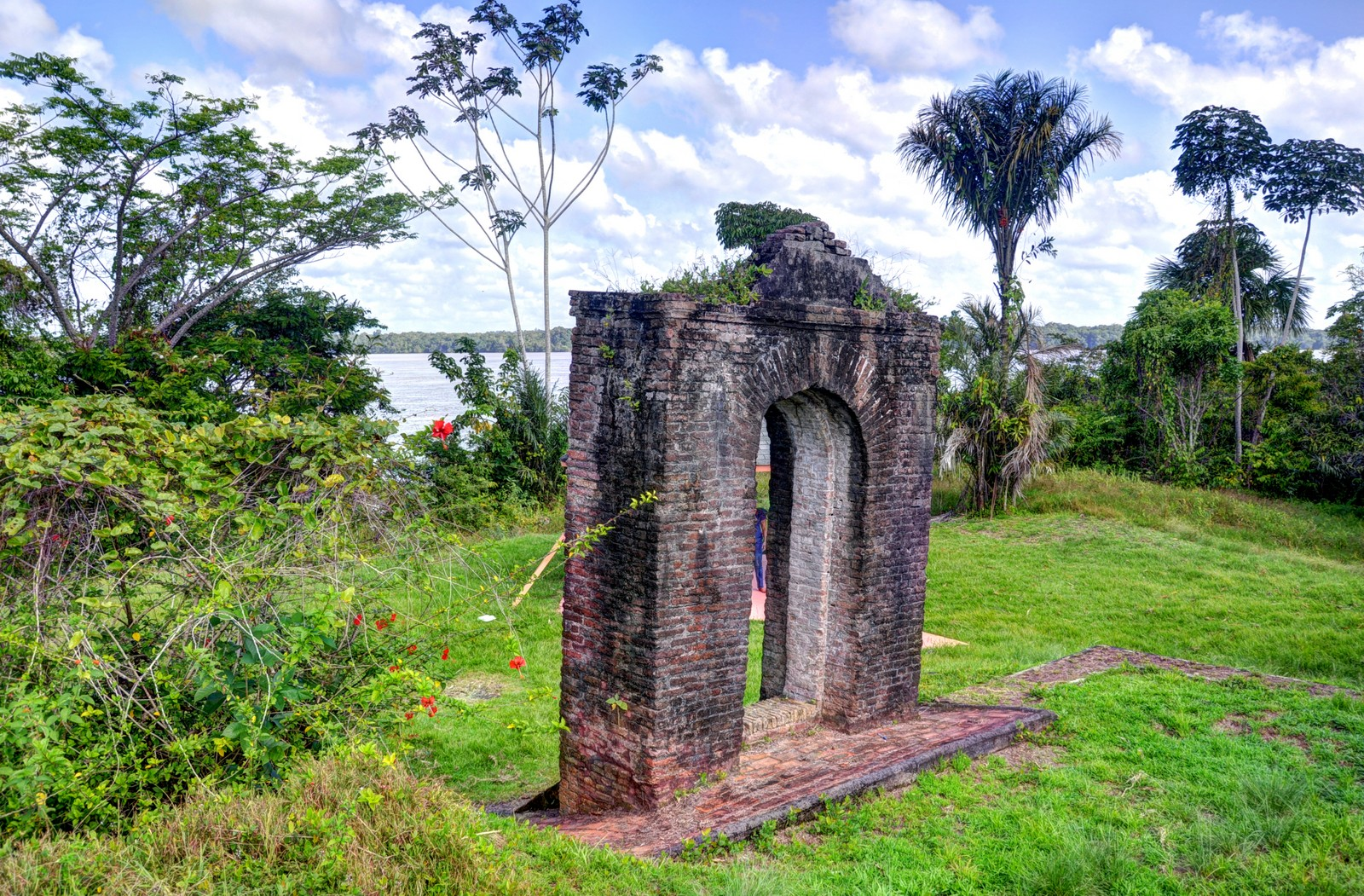
Fort Kyk-Over-Al
