= St Beuno's Jesuit Spirituality Centre =

Coordinates: 53°15′25.85″N 3°22′50.81″W

St Beuno's
- St Beuno's Jesuit Spirituality Centre
- St Beuno's College
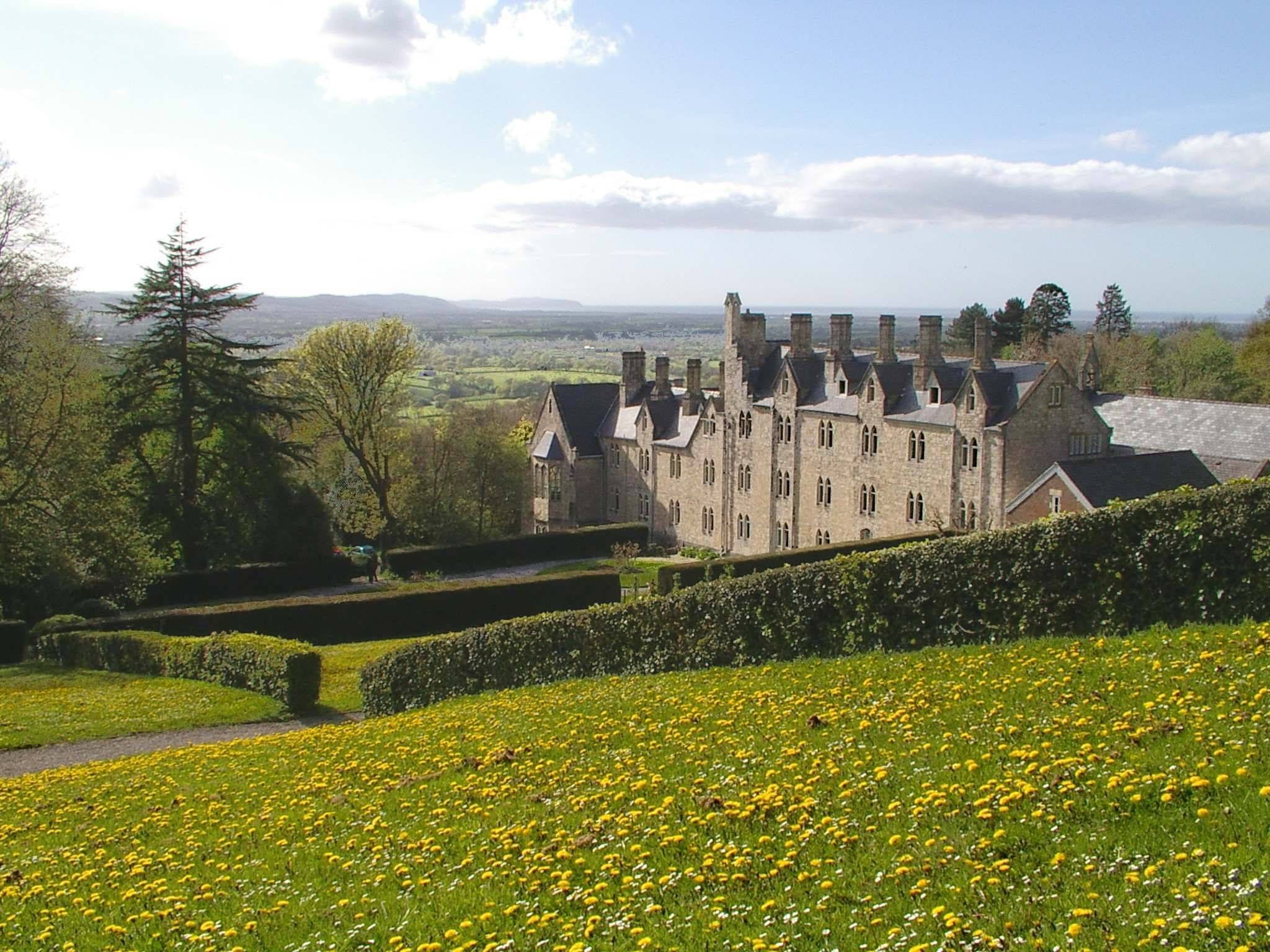
- South wing and grounds

- Location in Denbighshire
- Location: Tremeirchion, Denbighshire
- Country: Wales
- Denomination: Roman Catholic
- Website: Beunos.com

History
- Former name: St Beuno's College
- Status: Active
- Founded: 1846
- Founder: Randal Lythgoe SJ
- Dedication: Saint Beuno

Architecture
- Functional status: Spirituality Centre
- Heritage designation: Grade II* listed Denbighshire 26459
- Designated: 2002
- Architect: Joseph Hansom
- Groundbreaking: 1847
- Completed: 1848

Administration
- Province: Cardiff
- Diocese: Wrexham
- Deanery: Rhyl
- Parish: Vale of Clwyd

St Beuno's Jesuit Spirituality Centre, known locally as St Beuno's College, is a spirituality and retreat centre in Tremeirchion, Denbighshire, Wales. It was built in 1847 by the Jesuits, as a theology college. During the 1870s the Victorian poet Gerard Manley Hopkins studied there. Since 1980, it has been a spirituality and retreat centre. Standing on the Clwydian Range, the front of the building faces west towards Snowdonia and overlooks the Vale of Clwyd. The building became a Grade II* listed building and a Welsh Historic Monument in 2002.

== History ==
=== Foundation ===
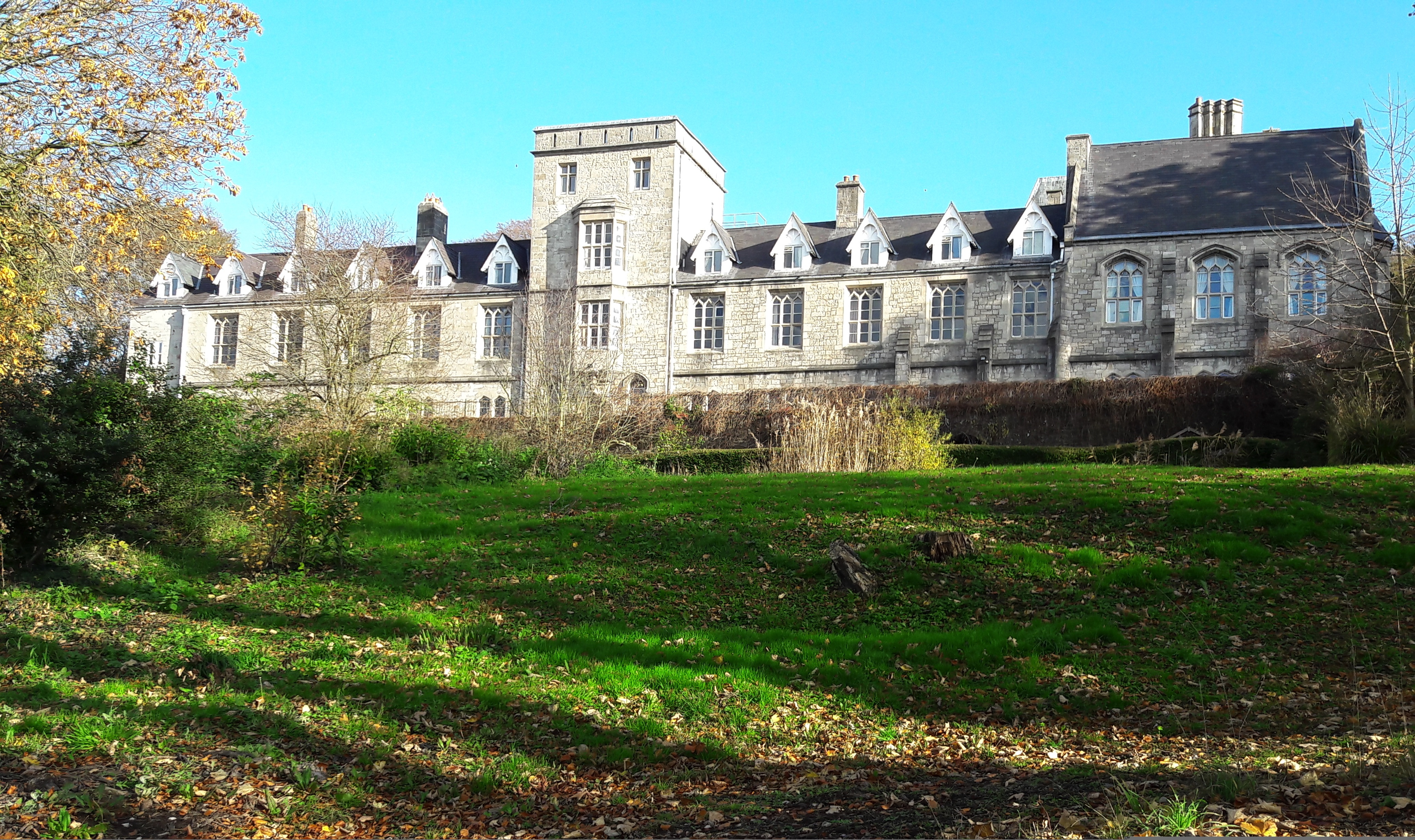
Front of building

In 1832, Following the Act of Catholic Emancipation of 1829, the Jesuits came to North Wales and founded St Winefride's Church in nearby Holywell, Flintshire. In 1846, Fr Randal Lythgoe, the Provincial of the Jesuits in Britain, visited Holywell and toured the neighbouring area. When he came to Tremeirchion, to see farm land which the Jesuits owned, he quickly resolved that this should be the site for a new college to train Jesuit recruits for the priesthood. The college was named after a local saint, St Beuno.

=== Construction ===
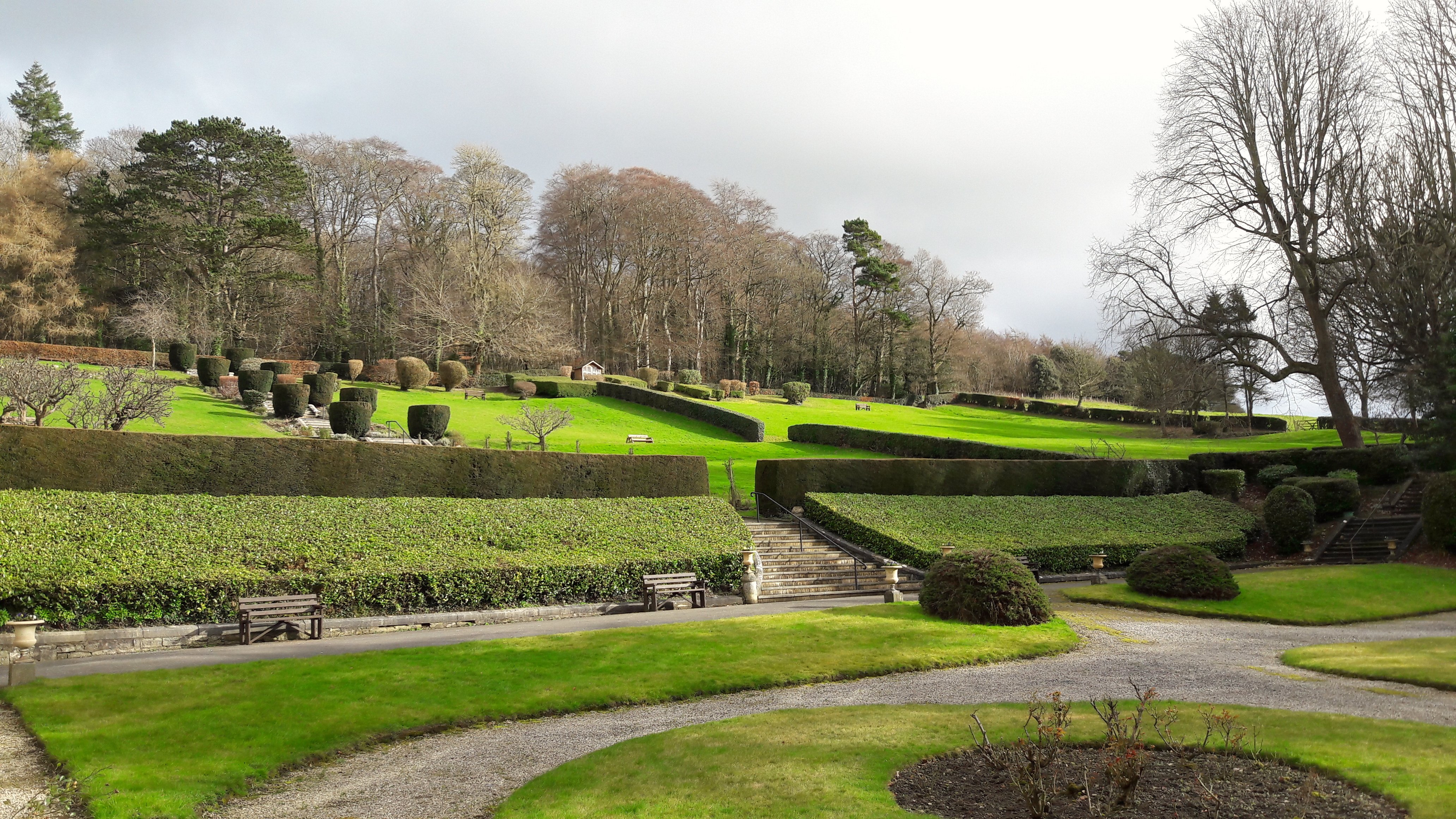
Gardens

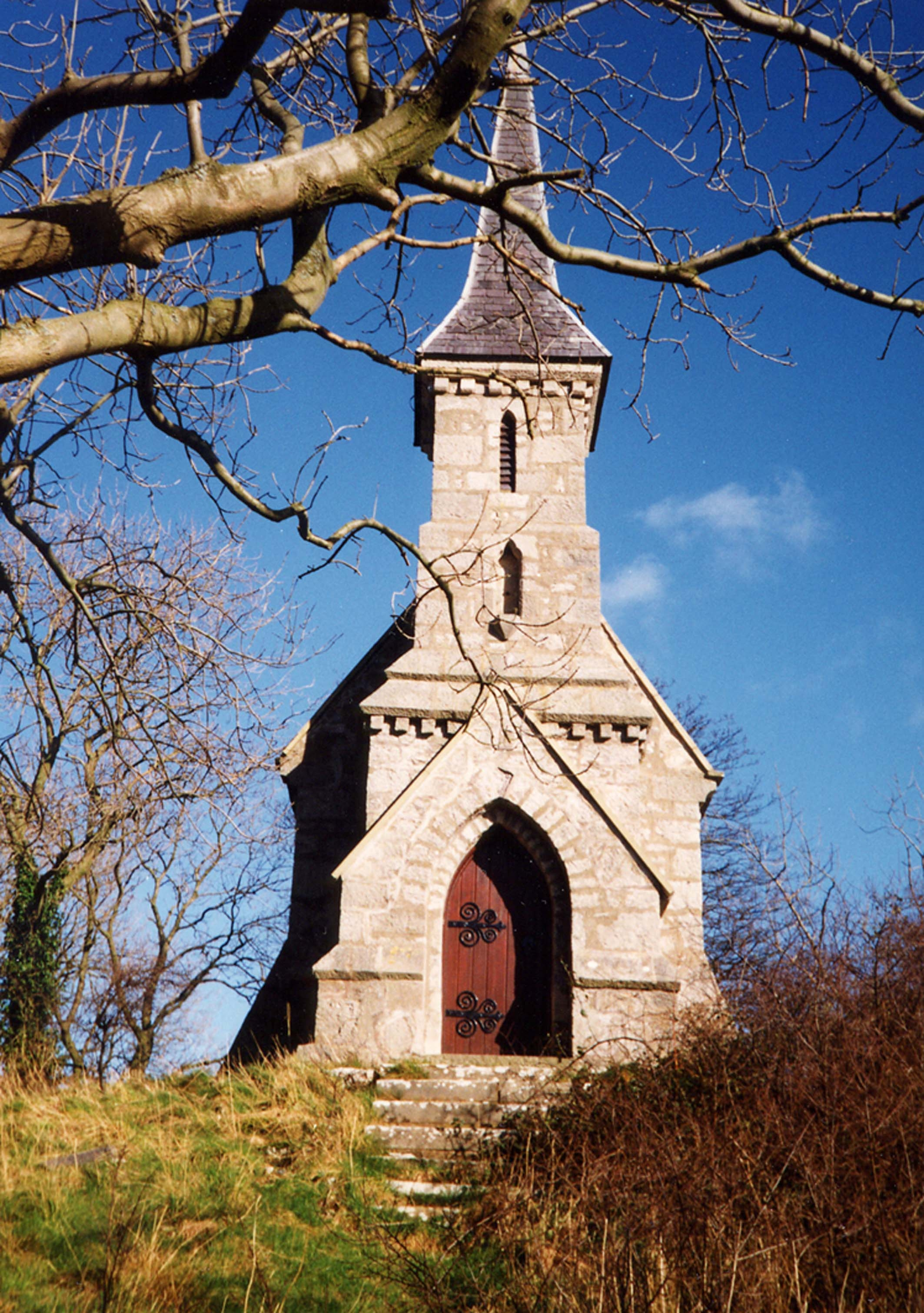
Rock chapel

St Beuno's was designed by the architect Joseph Aloysius Hansom, known for the Hansom cab. He went on to design many churches for the Jesuits, such as the Oxford Oratory, St Walburge's Church in Preston. In the late 1870s, Gerard Manley Hopkins while studying there, described the building, as "built of limestone, decent outside, skimping within, Gothic like Lancing College done worse."

Originally, St Beuno's College was a quadrangle enclosing a garden. The outside walls were made of stone, with Gothic gargoyles and stone carving, and inside were broad corridors and large but simple rooms. There were classrooms, a library, parlour and recreation room, all connected by a basement corridor on the west side of the building. On the south side, the highest part of the quadrangle, were three galleries which housed the teachers and the students. On the north side was the refectory.

Heating for the lower floor was provided by heat being channelled into the house from a greenhouse attached to the front west side of the building. Fresh water was provided from local streams and kept in tanks, which still exist above the terraces. Food was grown locally both in the college's grounds and on the adjacent college farm. The college had its own gas works. Furthermore, within the grounds, close to the entrance, a small school house was built to serve the local population.

Twenty years after its construction, St Beuno's College needed to be extended to accommodate the increased numbers of Jesuits training there. Extra rooms were added in the attics and a new North Wing was built to the left of the tower.

From 1862, the Tremeirchion Cross stood at the entrance of St Beuno's. It is a medieval stone carved cross. In the 16th century, it was described in his writings by the poet, Gruffydd ab Ieuan ap Llywelyn Fychan of Llanerch. It was originally in the churchyard of the local parish Corpus Christi Church in Tremeirchion. In 1862, the church sold it for £5 to raise funds to buy new lamps. It was bought by a Mr J. Y. Hinde of Rhyl who then gave it to St Beuno's. In 2002, St Beuno's gave it back to the local church, where it now stands in the churchyard, where it is a Grade II listed monument.

=== Developments ===
In 1926, the site ceased to be a training college. The Jesuit students were moved to Heythrop College in Oxfordshire. Instead, St Beuno's became a place of study for the final years of the long Jesuit training, the tertianship.

During the Second World War it was a place of refuge to many Jesuit novices who were sent from Manresa House in Roehampton, during and after the Blitz. After the war it reverted to its role as a tertianship centre.

=== Retreat Centre ===
From 1970 the house began to host its first retreats. It originally received religious sisters for 8-day and later, for 30-day retreats. Whereas the training of Jesuits became increasingly difficult in the countryside, far from city centres, the retreat work grew in popularity. In 1980, St Beuno's became a retreat centre.

St Beuno's runs a programme of retreats all the year round, ranging from short weekend retreats to those which last 30 days. It also offers courses in Ignatian Spirituality of one to six months' duration.

From 2018 to 2020 a large-scale renovation was undertaken to add en-suite facilities to rooms, create larger rooms for meetings and modernise the front entrance.

In the 2010s, retreats at St Beuno's began to be featured in the national media. In 2010, it was a location for the BBC series The Big Silence where participants spent 8 days on a silent retreat at St Beuno's. In 2017, two actors also did an 8-day retreat there in preparation for the Martin Scorsese film Silence.

== Rock Chapel ==
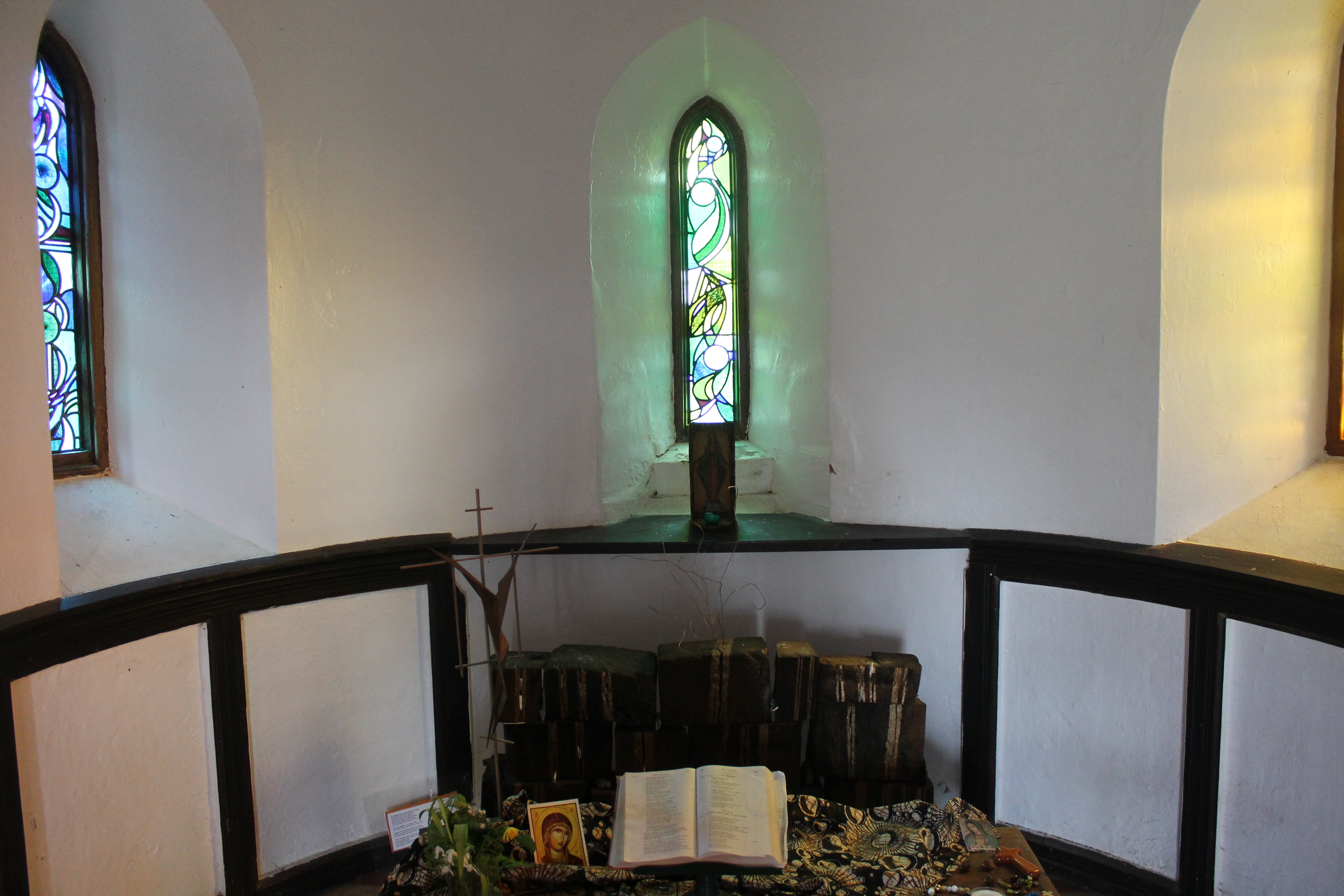
Rock chapel interior

In 1876 the 'Rock Chapel' was built on a wooded hill to the south of St Beuno's. It was designed by a Jesuit student, Ignatius Scoles, who had followed the footsteps of his father, Joseph John Scoles, as an architect before joining the Jesuits. Ignatius went on to design St Wilfrid's Church in Preston, Lancashire, Brickdam Cathedral and Georgetown City Hall in Guyana. From the Rock Chapel it is possible to see the village of Tremeirchion and the Vale of Clwyd. In 2020 repairs were made to the roof and stonework, and an appeal launched to fund improvements for furniture and access.

== Grounds ==
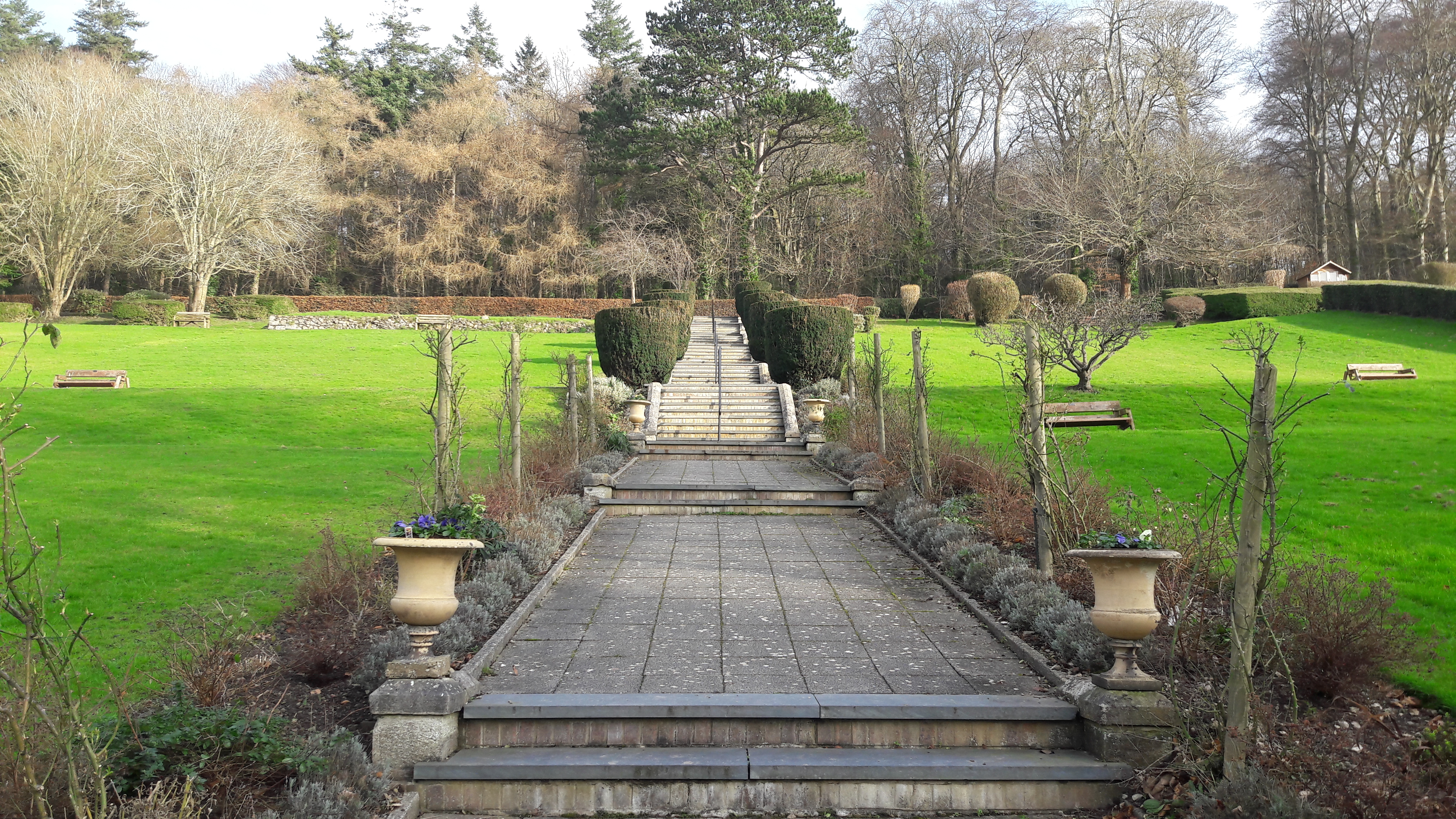
Steps in the garden

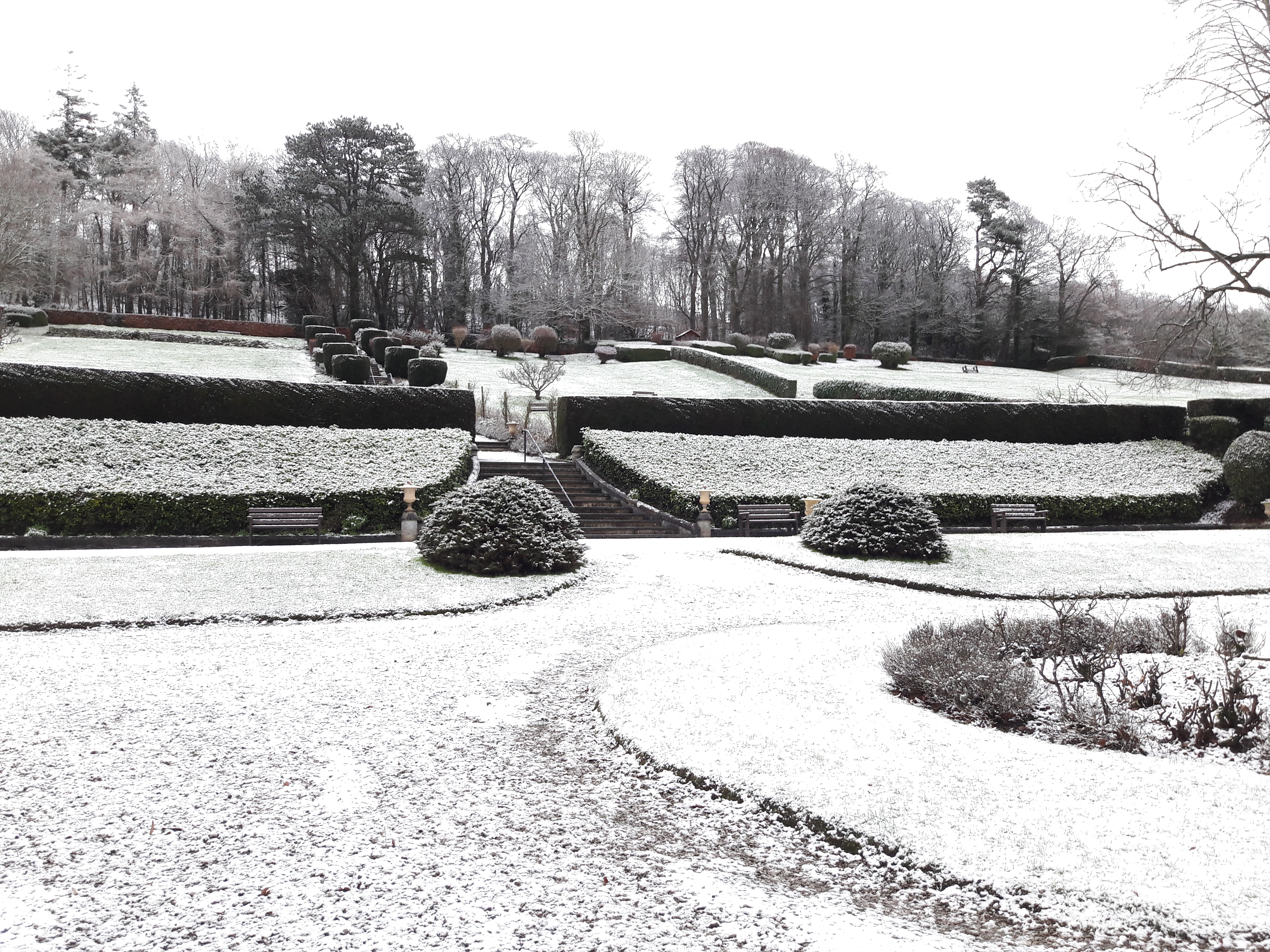
Garden in snow

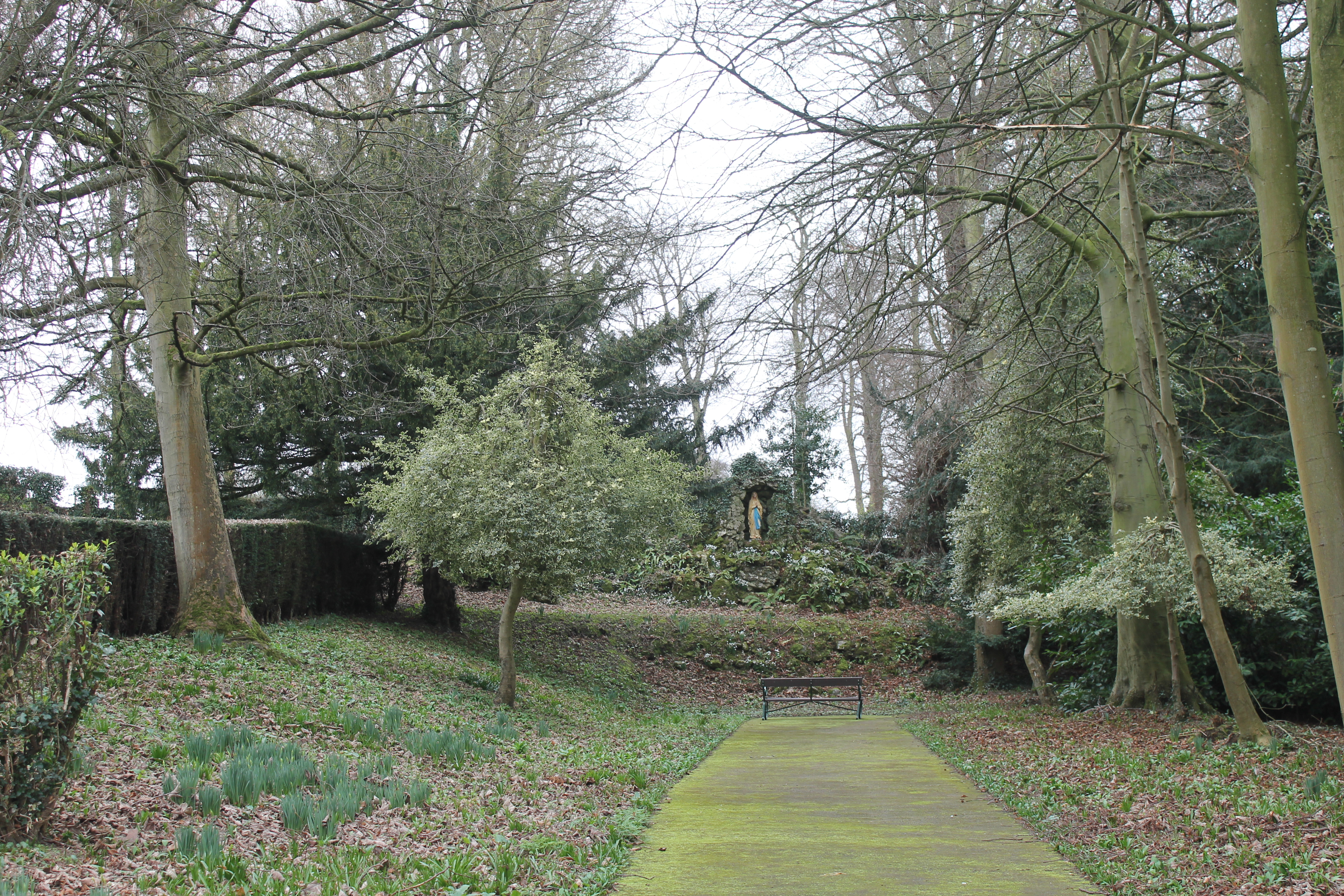
Pathway to grove

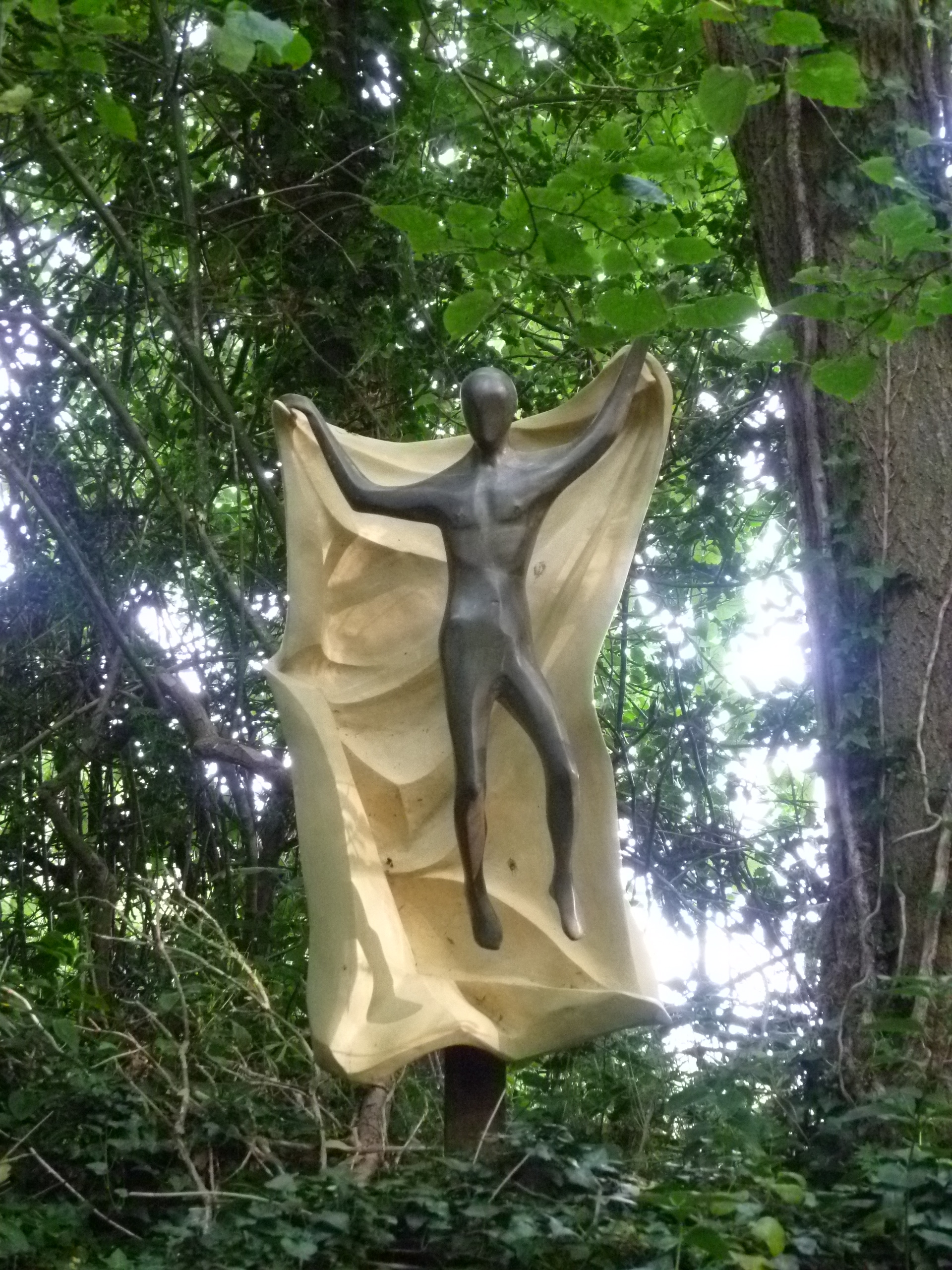
Stations of the Cross in the woodland garden: the 15th station - "Resurrection"

== See also ==
- Spiritual Exercises of Ignatius of Loyola
- List of Jesuit sites
- Loyola House
- Jesuit formation
