= Ignatius Scoles =

- Born: 1 December 1834
- Died: 15 July 1896 (aged 61); Guyana
- Occupations: Priest, architect, writer

Ignatius Scoles SJ (1 December 1834 – 15 July 1896) was a Roman Catholic Jesuit priest, architect and writer. He designed churches and civic buildings and was the son of Joseph John Scoles.

== Early life ==
He was born in Hammersmith in London. His father was the noted architect Joseph John Scoles, who was working on St Ignatius Church in Preston, Lancashire when Ignatius was born. His father did a lot of work for the Society of Jesus and named his eldest son after Ignatius of Loyola the founder of the Jesuits. His brother Alexander Joseph Cory Scoles followed him in becoming a priest, but not a Jesuit, instead he joined the Diocese of Clifton, later becoming a canon. He was also an architect and designed many churches in the south of England such as St Francis of Assisi Church in Birmingham and Our Lady of Loreto and St Winefride's Church in London.

His early education was at two Jesuit schools, Hodder Place and Stonyhurst College. In 1856, he was elected as an associate of the Royal Institute of British Architects.

== Jesuit ==
He joined the Jesuits on 9 October 1860 and was ordained in September 1866. Two years later, he was sent to, as it was then called, British Guyana.

Whilst he was there, he designed Georgetown City Hall and helped with the construction of Brickdam Cathedral. He recorded his time in Guyana by writing Sketches of African and Indian Life in British Guiana (Kessinger, 1885). He returned in England in 1874, but went back to Guyana in 1880 and died there in 1896.

== Works ==
- Rock Chapel at St Beuno's Ignatian Spirituality Centre, Denbighshire, Wales in 1866.
- Interior of Brickdam Cathedral, Georgetown, Guyana in 1871 (burnt down in 1913).
- Remodeling of St Wilfrid's Church, Preston, Lancashire, England in 1880.
- Georgetown City Hall in 1889.

== Gallery ==
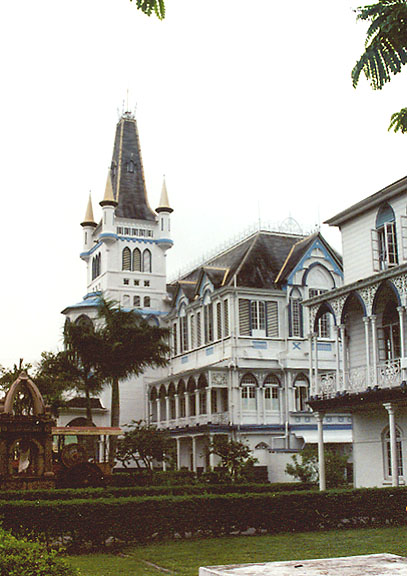
Georgetown City Hall

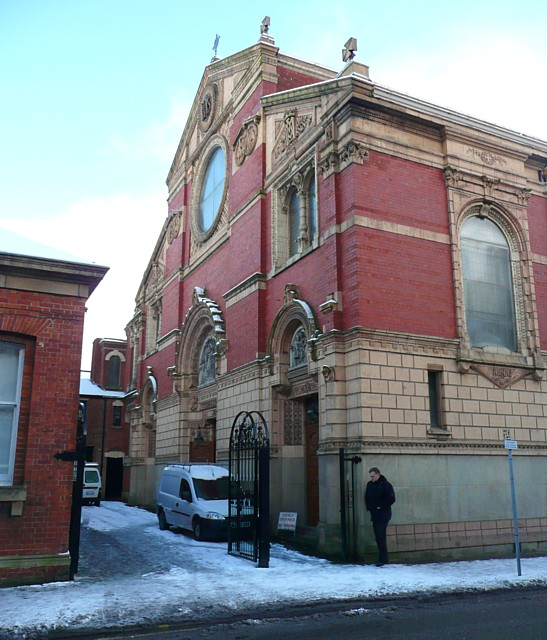
St Wilfrid's Church, Preston

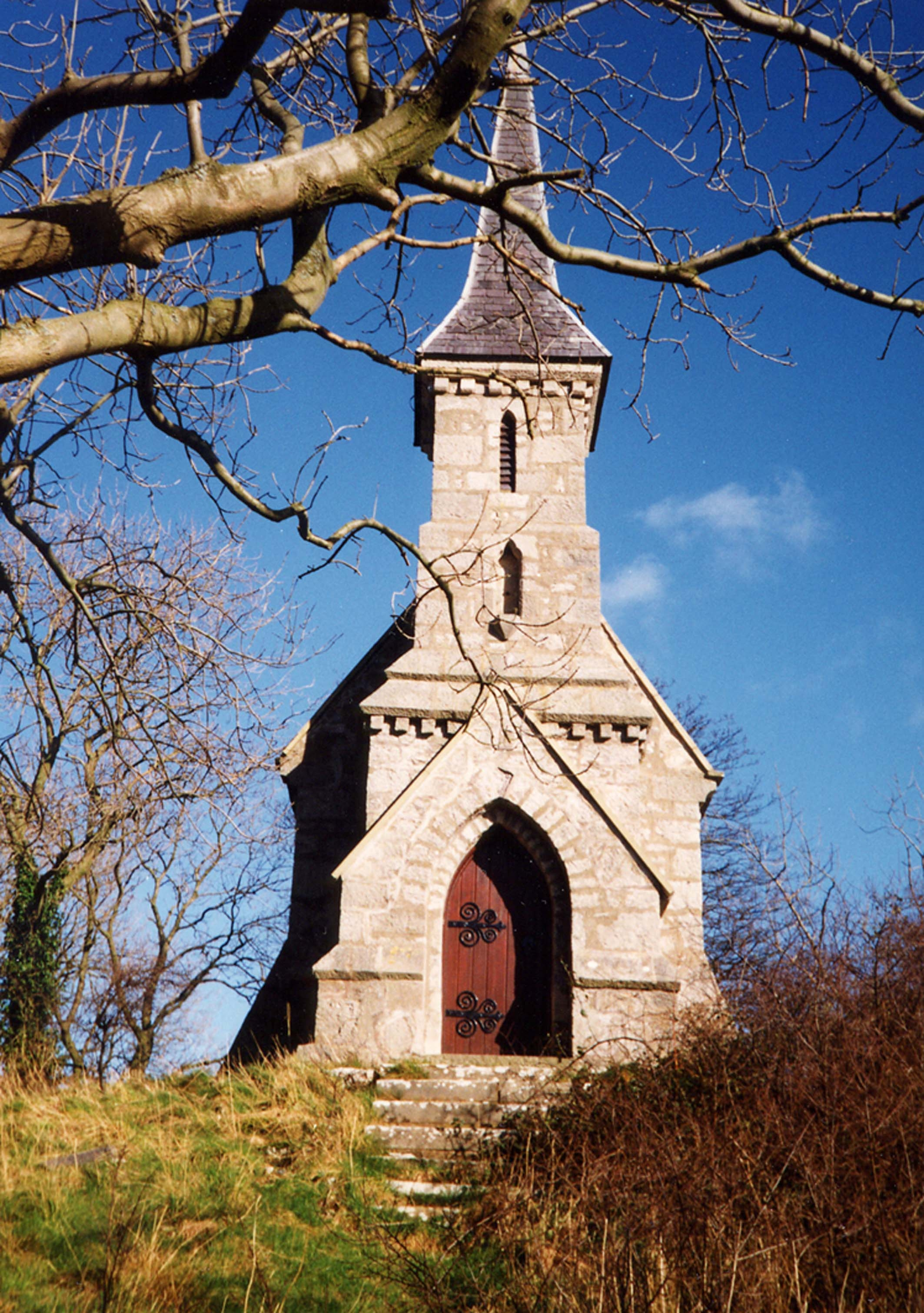
Rock Chapel at St Beuno's Ignatian Spirituality Centre
