= St Winefride's Church, Holywell =

St Winefride's Church
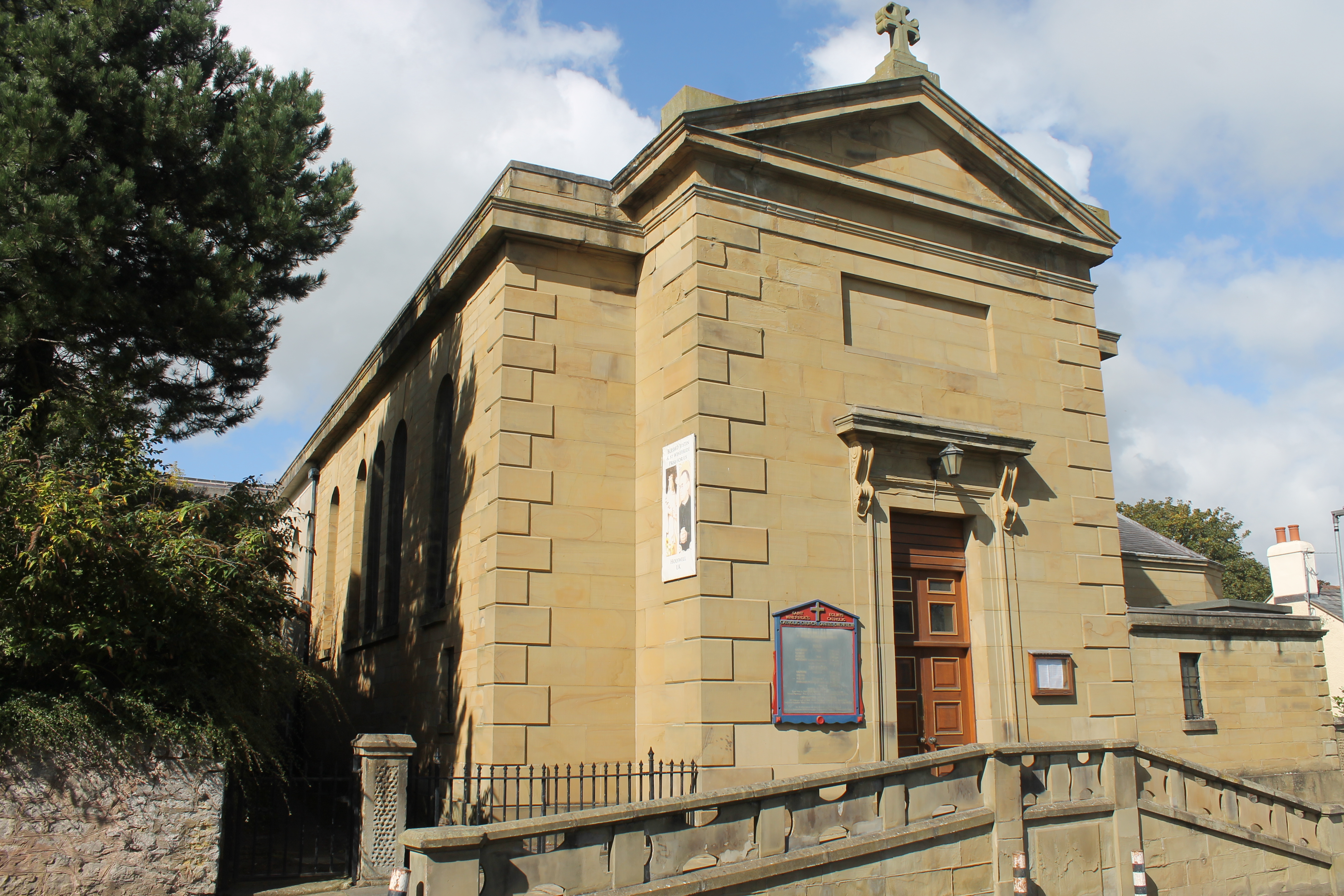
- Doorway to church
- St Winefride's Church
- 53.275301°N 3.222896°W
- Location: Holywell, Flintshire
- Country: Wales
- Denomination: Roman Catholic

History
- Founder: Society of Jesus
- Dedication: St Winefride

Architecture
- Heritage designation: Grade II listed
- Designated: 19 August 1991
- Architect: Joseph John Scoles
- Groundbreaking: 1832

Administration
- Province: Cardiff
- Diocese: Wrexham
- Deanery: Flint

St Winefride's Church (also known as St Winifred's Church or St Winefred's Church) is a Roman Catholic Parish church in Holywell, Flintshire. It was founded by the Society of Jesus and was until recently the first church in the United Kingdom to be administered by the Vocationist Fathers now since departed as the parish returns into diocesan hands. It is Grade II listed building. It was the first church the Jesuits built in Wales.

== History ==
It was founded by the Jesuits in 1832. They went on to establish St Beuno's College in 1848. From the college they also founded other churches and missions such as Our Lady of the Assumption Church in Rhyl in 1851, in Denbigh in 1853, St Winefride's Church in St Asaph in 1854, Our Lady Help of the Christians Church in Ruthin and Our Lady of Ransom and the Holy Souls Church in Llandrindod Wells in 1907.

By the 1930s they were asked by the Bishop of Menevia, Francis Vaughan to hand over the church to the Diocese of Wrexham. On 19 August 1991, the church was designated a Grade II listed building.

On 6 April 2008, the Bishop of Wrexham, Edwin Regan, invited the Vocationist Fathers to the church who until 24 April 2023 administered the parish. it has now reverted to a diocesan priest administration as before.

== Shrines ==
=== Holywell ===
Within the parish is one of the Seven Wonders of Wales, St Winefride's Well, a shrine and site of pilgrimage. The shrine and relics are in the care of the church.

=== Pantasaph ===
Close to the parish, near Holywell, is the National Shrine of St Pio and St David's Church in the village of Pantasaph. It was founded in 1852, by the Order of Friars Minor Capuchin.

== Parish ==
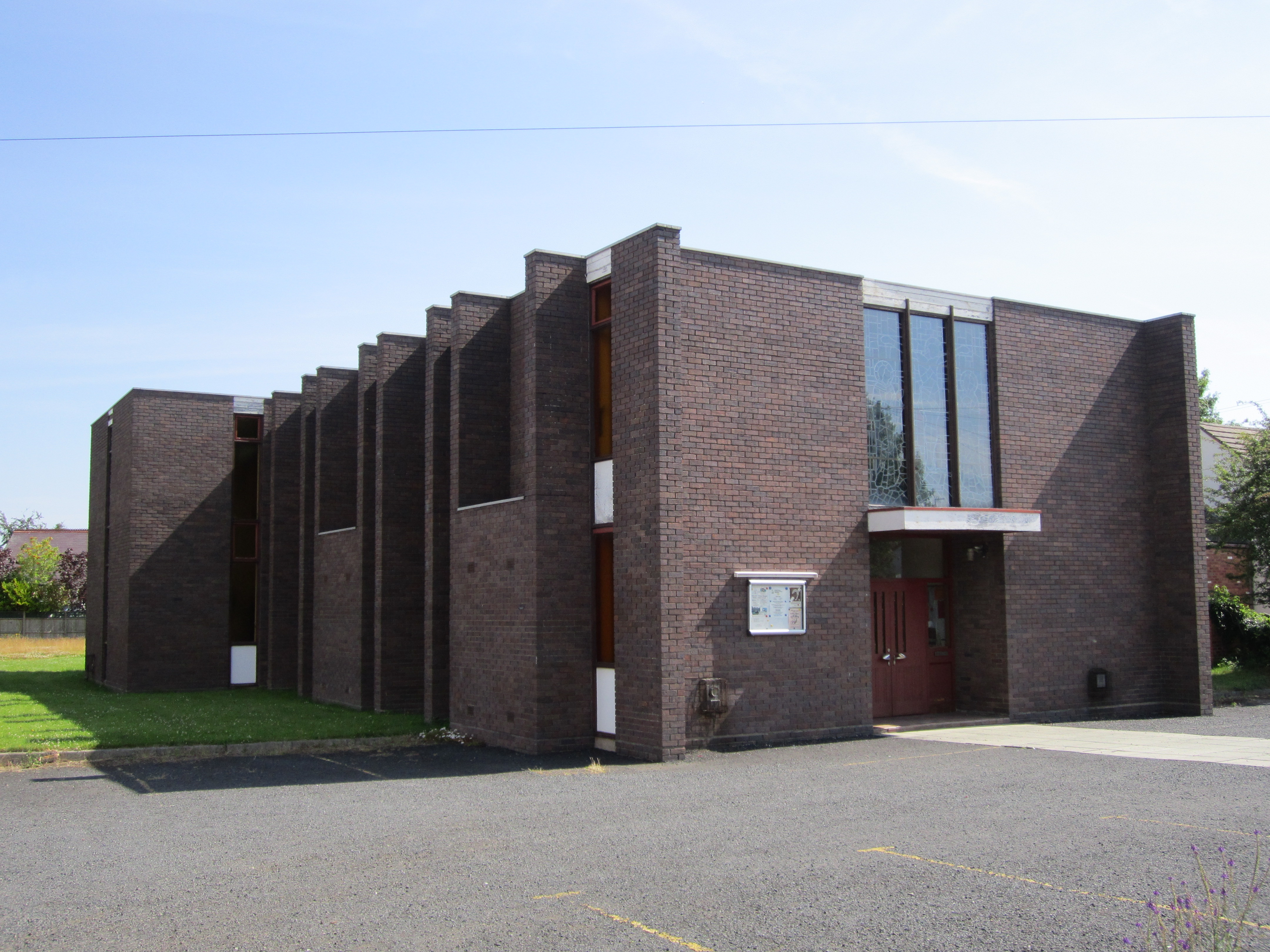
Sacred Heart Church in Hawarden also served by the Vocationist Fathers

The Vocationist Fathers also serve the Sacred Heart church in Hawarden. The church was founded by the Diocese of Wrexham and was built in the late twentieth century. It has one Sunday Mass at 10:30am.

St Winefride's has three Sunday Masses, one at 6:00pm on Saturday evening in the church, and at 9:30am and 5pm on Sunday in the chapel of St Winefride's Well. There are weekday Masses at 9:30am on Monday, Wednesday and Friday and at 7:00pm on Tuesday and Thursday.

== Stained glass ==
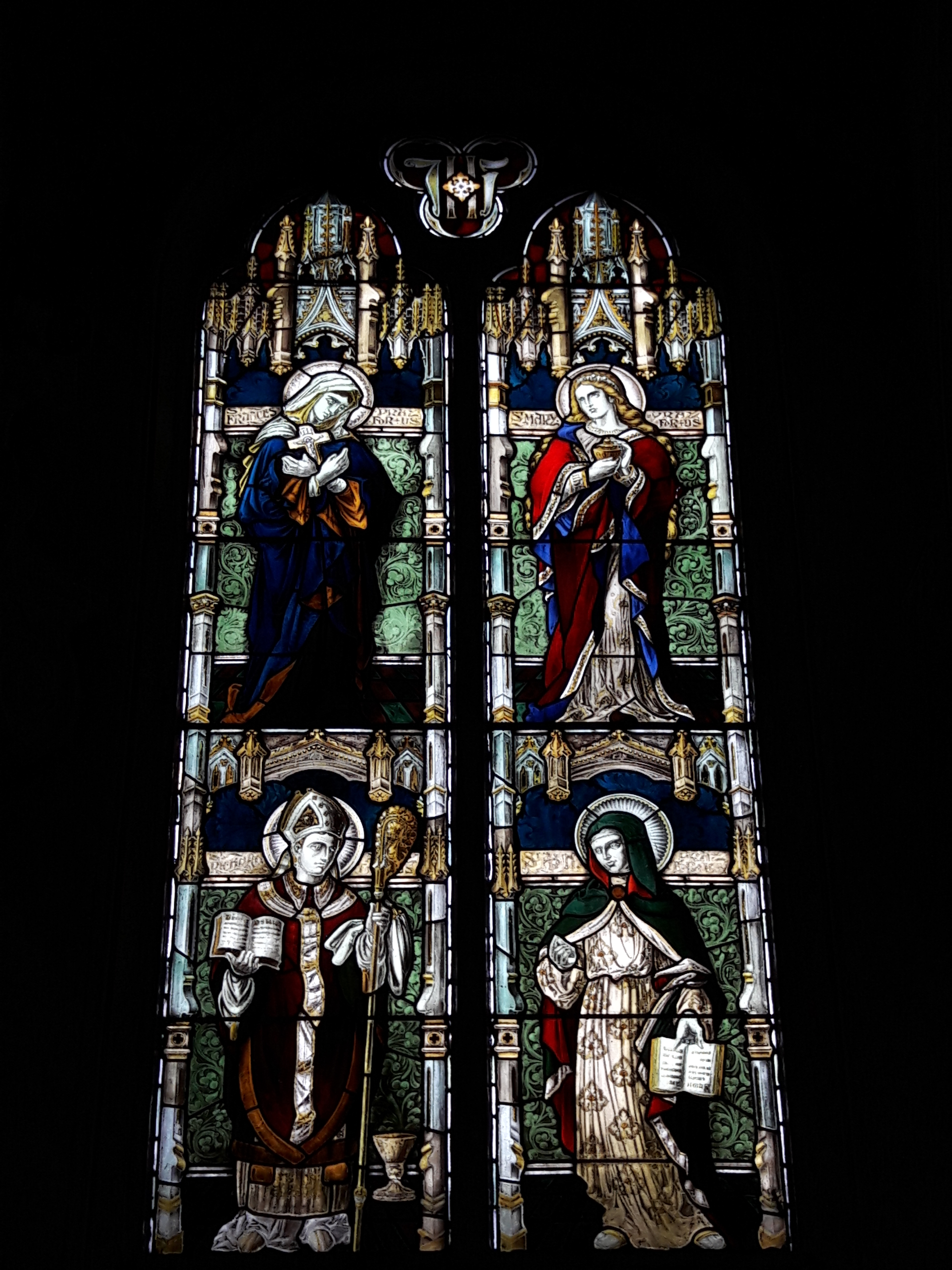

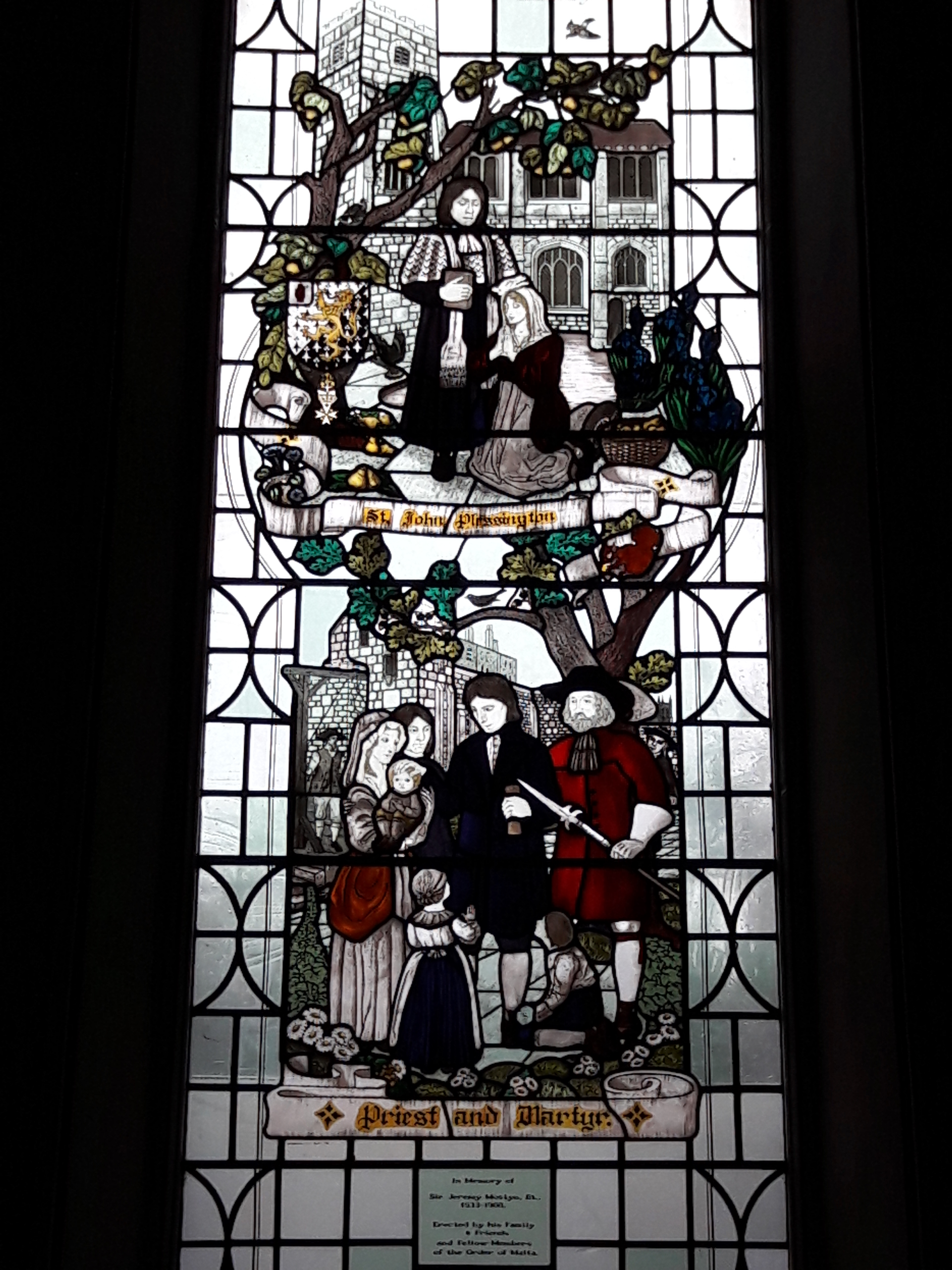

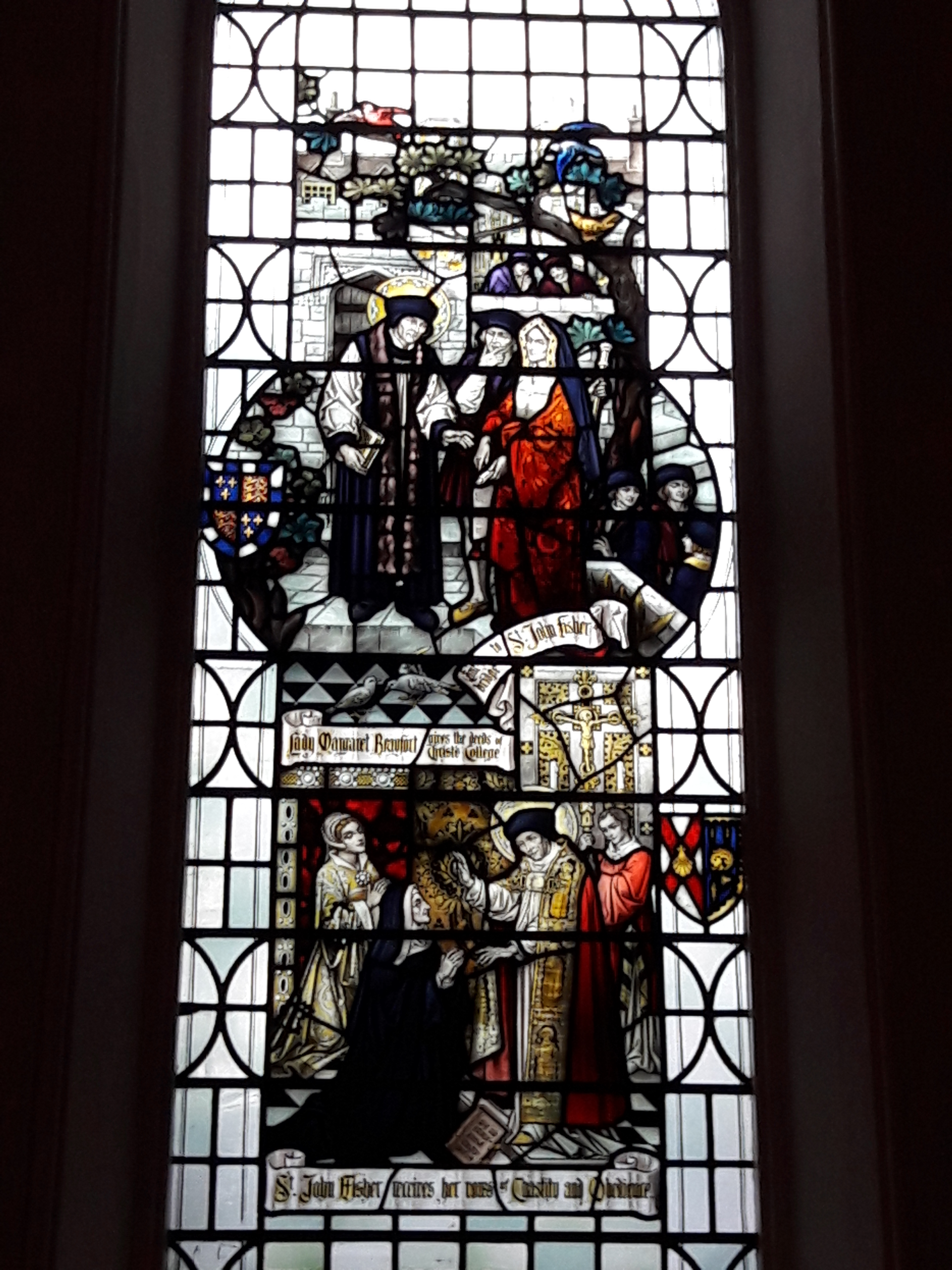
