= Cesar Castellani =

Maltese architect (died 1905)

Cesar Castellani (died 2 August 1905) was an architect born in the Crown Colony of Malta; he emigrated to British Guiana in 1860, where he designed buildings such as the Brickdam Cathedral; Castellani House, the Brickdam Police Station; the New Amsterdam Public Hospital, the Church of the Sacred Heart on Main Street (1872-1882), and parts of the eastern wing of the Parliament Building. Cesar Castellani died in Georgetown, British Guiana on 2 August 1905.

The design of the Victoria Law Courts, credited to Baron Harco Theodor Hora Siccama, is reminiscent of Castellani's, and Castellani was working for Siccama as a draughtsman.

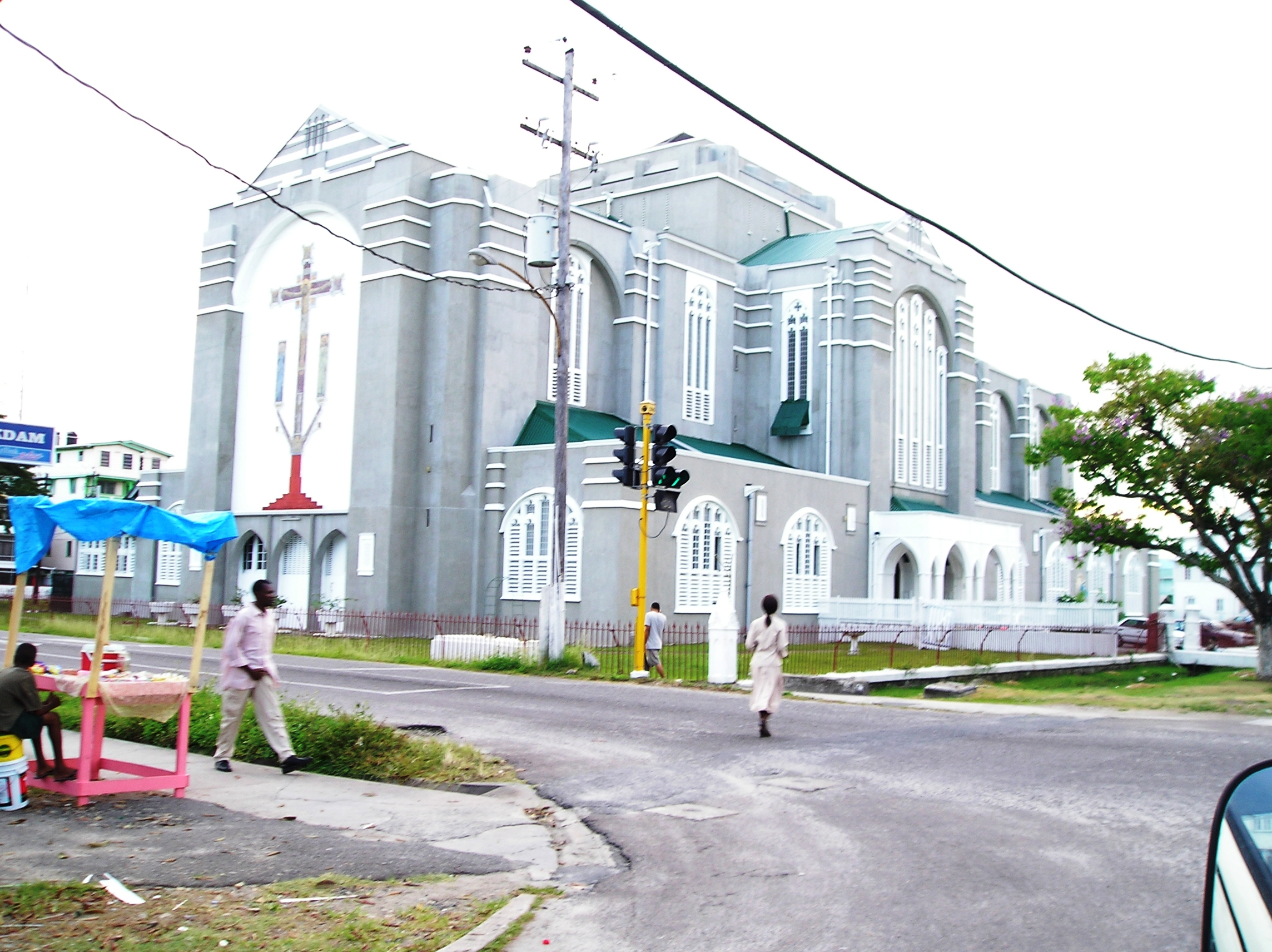
Immaculate Conception Cathedral, Georgetown

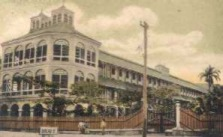
New Amsterdam Public Hospital (1950)
