= New Amsterdam Public Hospital =

Hospital in Guyana

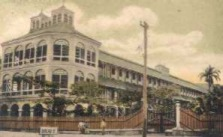
- New Amsterdam Public Hospital (1950)

- Shown in Guyana

Geography
- Location: New Amsterdam, Guyana
- Coordinates: 6.25500°N 57.51326°W

Organisation
- Type: General

Services
- Beds: 272

History
- Founded: 1885

Links
- Lists: Hospitals in Guyana

New Amsterdam Public Hospital in New Amsterdam, Guyana, is the country's biggest hospital after Georgetown Public Hospital.

It was described as a “timber architectural masterpiece”. The building was later declared unfit to work and left abandoned. It slowly collapsed due to vandalism and deterioration. Old location: 6.2412°N 57.5217°W

In 1893, the hospital had 150 beds, four sick wards (one designated for females) each with 24 beds with a window between each bed.

The hospital moved to a new location in 2005.
