= Georgetown City Hall =

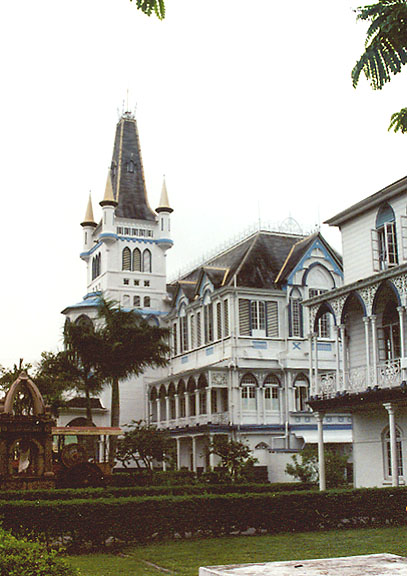

- Location within Guyana

General information
- Type: City Hall
- Architectural style: Gothic Revival
- Location: Georgetown, Guyana
- Coordinates: 6.81102°N 58.165054°W
- Completed: 1889
- Cost: $54,826,62 (Guyanese dollars)
- Owner: Georgetown City Council

Height
- Height: 29.3 m (96 ft)

Dimensions
- Diameter: 17.4 m (57 ft)
- Other dimensions: 27.1 metres (length)

Technical details
- Floor count: 3

Design and construction
- Architect: Father Scoles

Georgetown City Hall is a nineteenth-century Gothic Revival building located on the corner of Regent Street and Avenue of the Republic in Georgetown, Guyana. The building was designed by architect Reverend Ignatius Scoles in 1887, and was completed in June 1889. The building houses the offices of the Mayor, the City Council, and the City Engineer.

Georgetown City Hall is often described as "the most picturesque structure" and "the most handsome building in Georgetown", as well as "one of the finest examples of Gothic architecture in the Caribbean". In 1995, the Government of Guyana proposed Georgetown City Hall as a UNESCO World Heritage Site. The building currently occupies the status of "tentative listing".

== History ==
=== History of Construction ===
Planning for the construction of a Town Hall in Georgetown began in 1854, not long after the formation of the Town Council in 1837. Initially, councillors proposed that the building should be located either in front of Stabroek Market or on the corner of Church Street and Main Street (now the location of the National Library of Guyana).

On 22 November 1886, the Town Council endorsed proposals for the construction of a Town Hall, and a Committee - led by the Mayor - was formed to supervise the design of the building. Shortly afterwards Mayor George Anderson Forshaw purchased the site where the present building now stands. The Committee met on 17 March 1887, and were joined by the Cesar Castellani (himself the architect of many prominent buildings in Georgetown). They chose a design entitled "Damus Pitimusque Vicissim" (a Latin phrase meaning "we give and we ask in turn") by Reverend Ignatius Scoles - an architect who had designed a number of churches in Europe. Scoles was awarded a prize of $50, which he declined. The building contract was given to Sprostons and Sons of the La Penitence Woodworking Company.

At 2pm on 23 December 1887, Governor Henry Turner Irving laid the foundation stone for the City Hall. The foundation stone was laid at the North East corner of the main building, along with a glass jar containing original documents relating to the building, copies of the leading newspapers of British Guiana at that time - The Royal Gazette, The Argosy and The Daily Chronicle, a portrait of Queen Victoria, and a number of coins. The Foundation Ceremony was accompanied by the Militia Band.

The City Hall was completed in June 1889. The full cost of the building, including the price for the purchase of the land, was $54,826,62.

The City Hall was officially opened at 3pm on 1 July 1889 by Governor Viscount Gormanston. The Archbishop of British Guiana, William Piercy Austin, then blessed the structure. The Mayor read an address to the Governor, and the Governor officially congratulated the Council on their work and declared the building open. The Invitation Committee sent out 400 invitations to the most prominent people in Guyana for the Opening Ceremony, and a large number of them were present at the event. In the evening of the same day, the building was opened to the public. 6000 tickets were issued, but it is estimated that around 8000 people passed through the building at some point during the evening event. The public event went on until 9.30pm and included performances by the Militia Band and the Portuguese Band.

In 1891 the Georgetown Fire Brigade moved into the ground floor of the building. Shortly afterwards, the Town Council bought the land between the City Hall and the Supreme Court of Judicature. In 1896, a fire station, stables for horses and a residence for the Sergeant Major in charge of the Fire Brigade were built on this land at the cost of $6,500 (Guyanese dollars). These buildings, which have since been altered and extended, now house the offices of the City Engineer, the Mayor and his staff.

=== Modern times ===
In 1995, the Government of Guyana included the City Hall as part of a list of 13 National Monuments in a proposal to inscribe Georgetown as a UNESCO World Heritage Site. Other structures on the list included State House, the Walter Roth Museum of Anthropology, St. George's Cathedral, St. Andrew's Kirk and Stabroek Market. The City Hall was accepted as a "tentative listing".

Over the years, the City Hall has gradually fallen into disrepair and numerous appeals have been made for its renovation. In June 2011, Mayor Hamilton Green announced that $20 million in funds would be put towards the renovation of the building. $5 million was spent on buying and installing new windows. In 2012, however, the renovation project was reported to have "stalled".

== Architectural design ==
Georgetown City Hall is an example of Gothic Revival architecture. It is built in timber, possesses three floors and has a rectangular shape. The tower - one of the building's most notable features - is topped by a square, pyramidal, flat-topped spire with wrought-iron crenelations around the perimeter of the spire's apex. The spire is surrounded by conical pillars. The building has a Hammer-beam roof (a feature of Medieval Gothic architecture in England), and an elaborate Mahogany staircase joins the first and second floors of the building. The building is 27.1 metres long, 17.4 metres wide and 29.3 metres high.

== Uses ==
As well as housing the offices of the Mayor, the City Council and the City Engineer, Georgetown City Hall houses a Concert Hall which is one of the main venues for concerts and recitals in the city. Musicians that have performed in the Concert Hall of the City Hall include the British Guiana Philharmonic Orchestra; Ray Luck, the Guyanese concert pianist; and the Police Male Voice Choir who held their first ever concert at the venue.
