= Flint Deanery =

The Flint Deanery is a Roman Catholic deanery in the Diocese of Wrexham that covers several churches in Flintshire, Wales.

The dean is centred at the Church of the Immaculate Conception in Flint.

== Churches ==
- Our Lady of the Rosary, Buckley
- The Blessed Sacrament, Connah's Quay
- The Blessed Trinity, Queensferry – served from Connah's Quay
- The Immaculate Conception, Flint
- St Winefride, Holywell
- The Sacred Heart, Hawarden
- St David, Mold
- St David, Pantasaph – served by the Capuchins
- St Anthony of Padua, Saltney

== Gallery ==
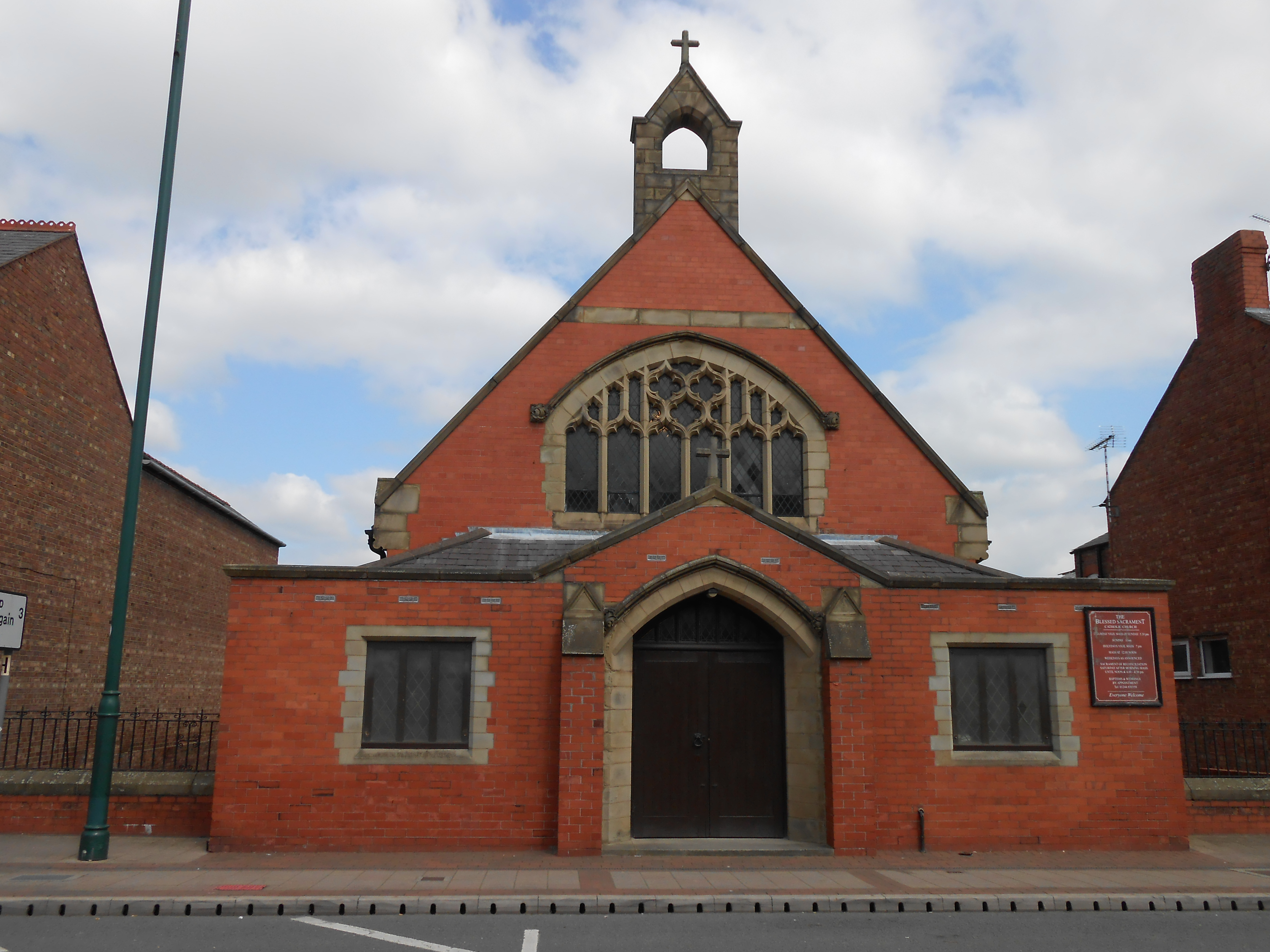
Blessed Sacrament, Connah's Quay

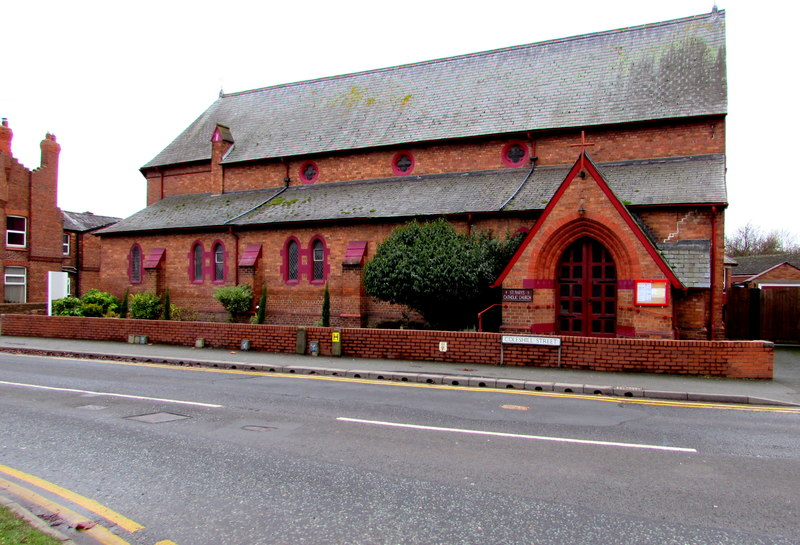
Immaculate Conception, Flint

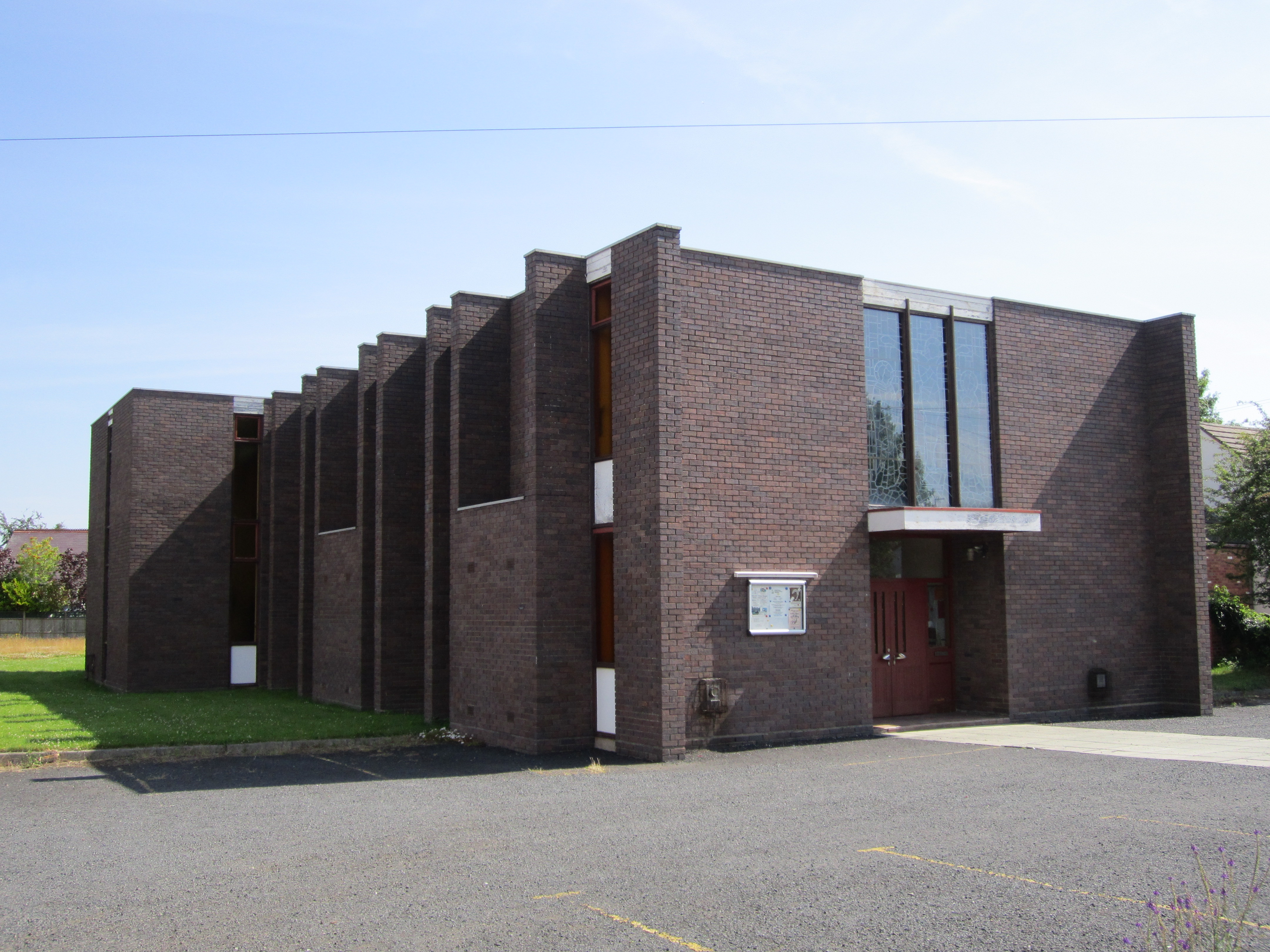
Sacred Heart, Hawarden

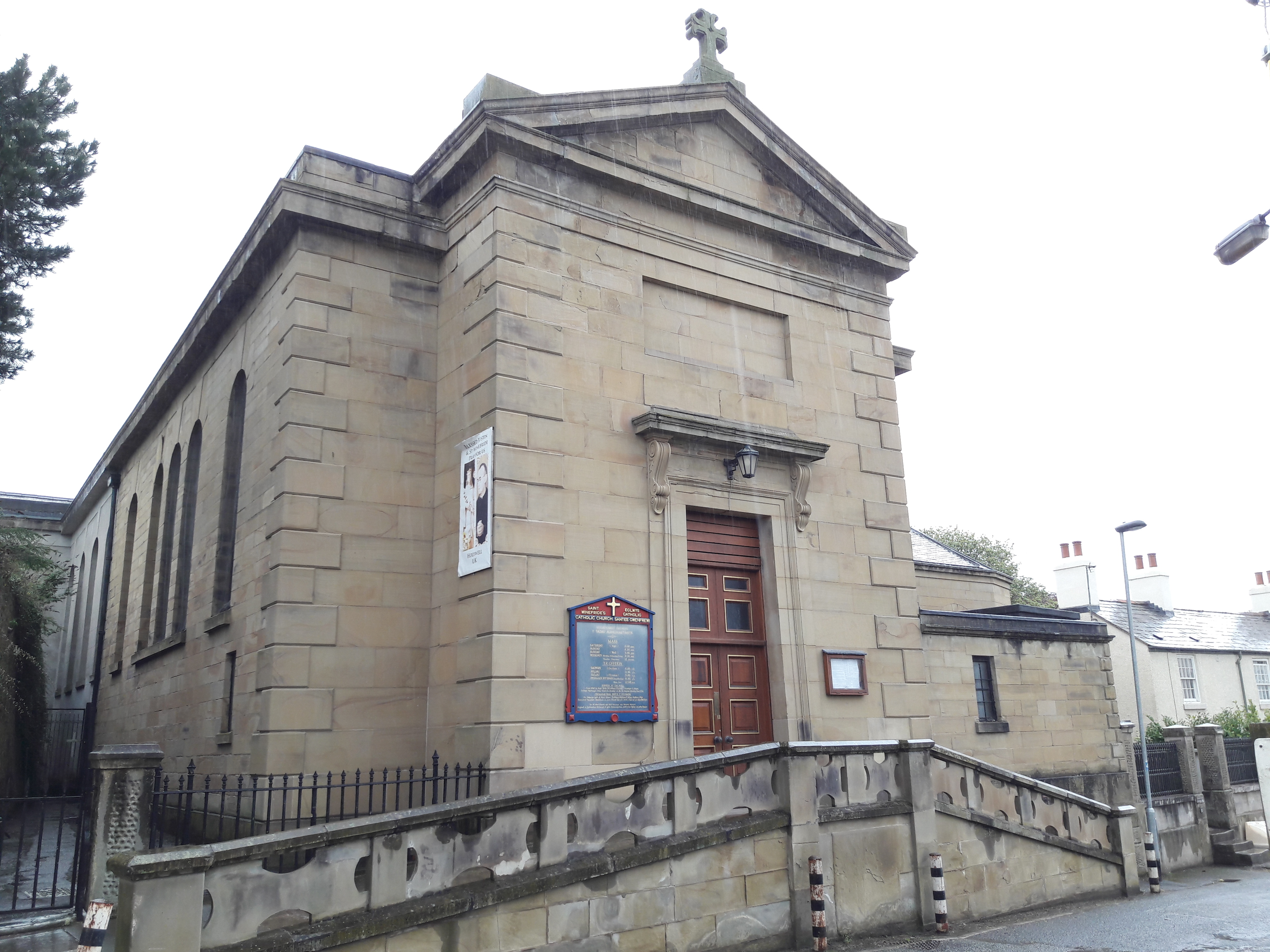
St Winefride, Holywell

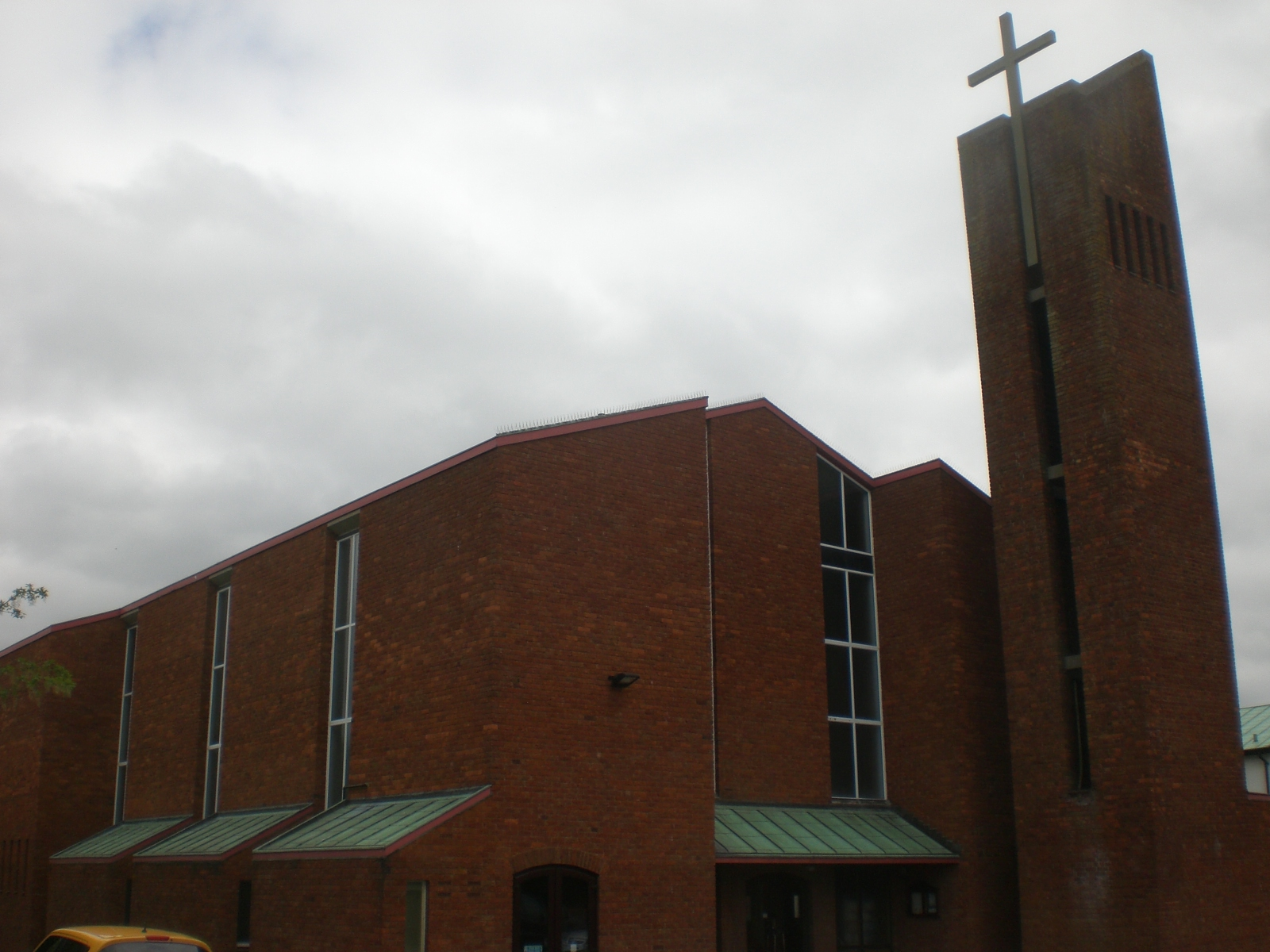
St David, Mold

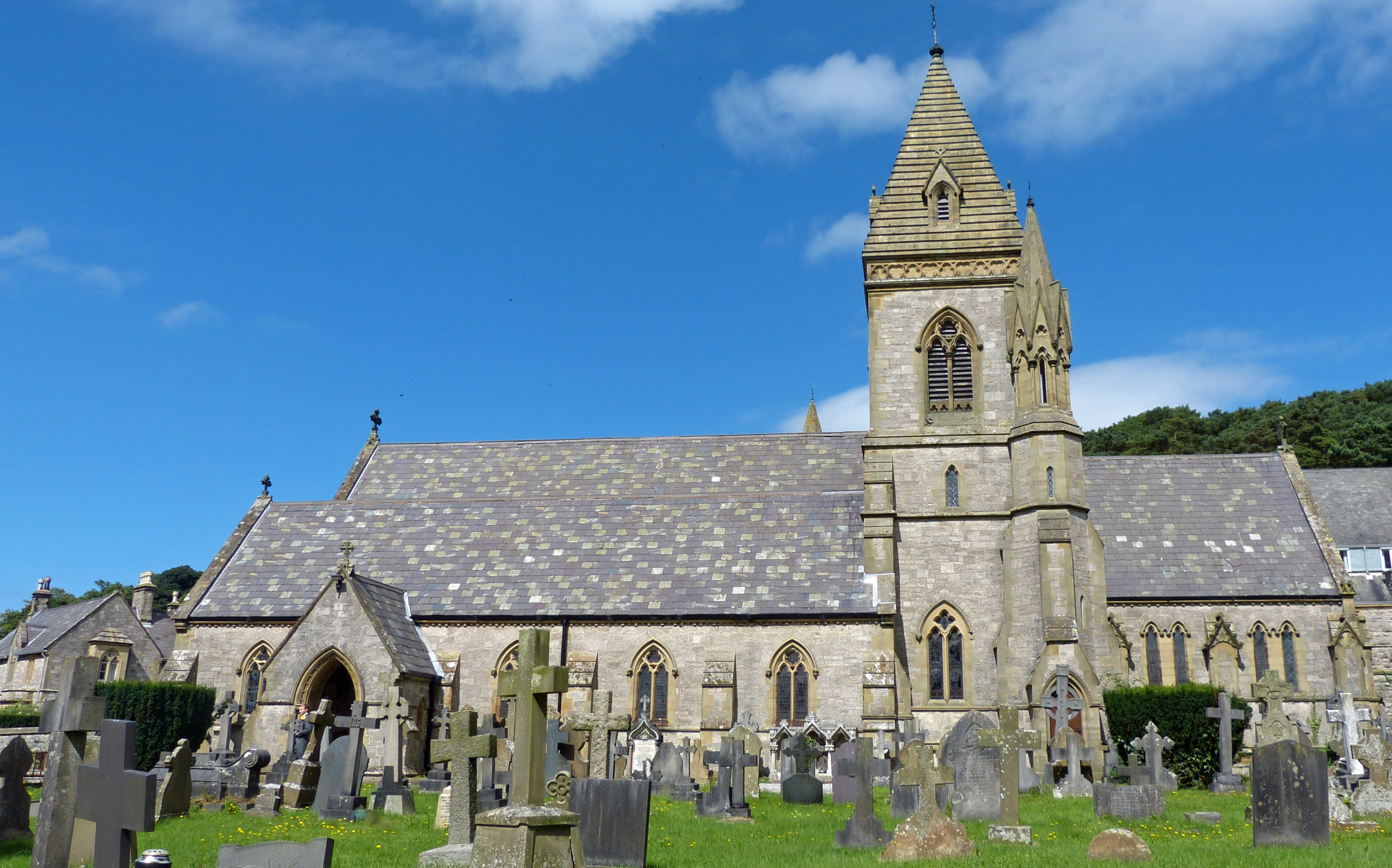
St David's Friary Church, Pantasaph

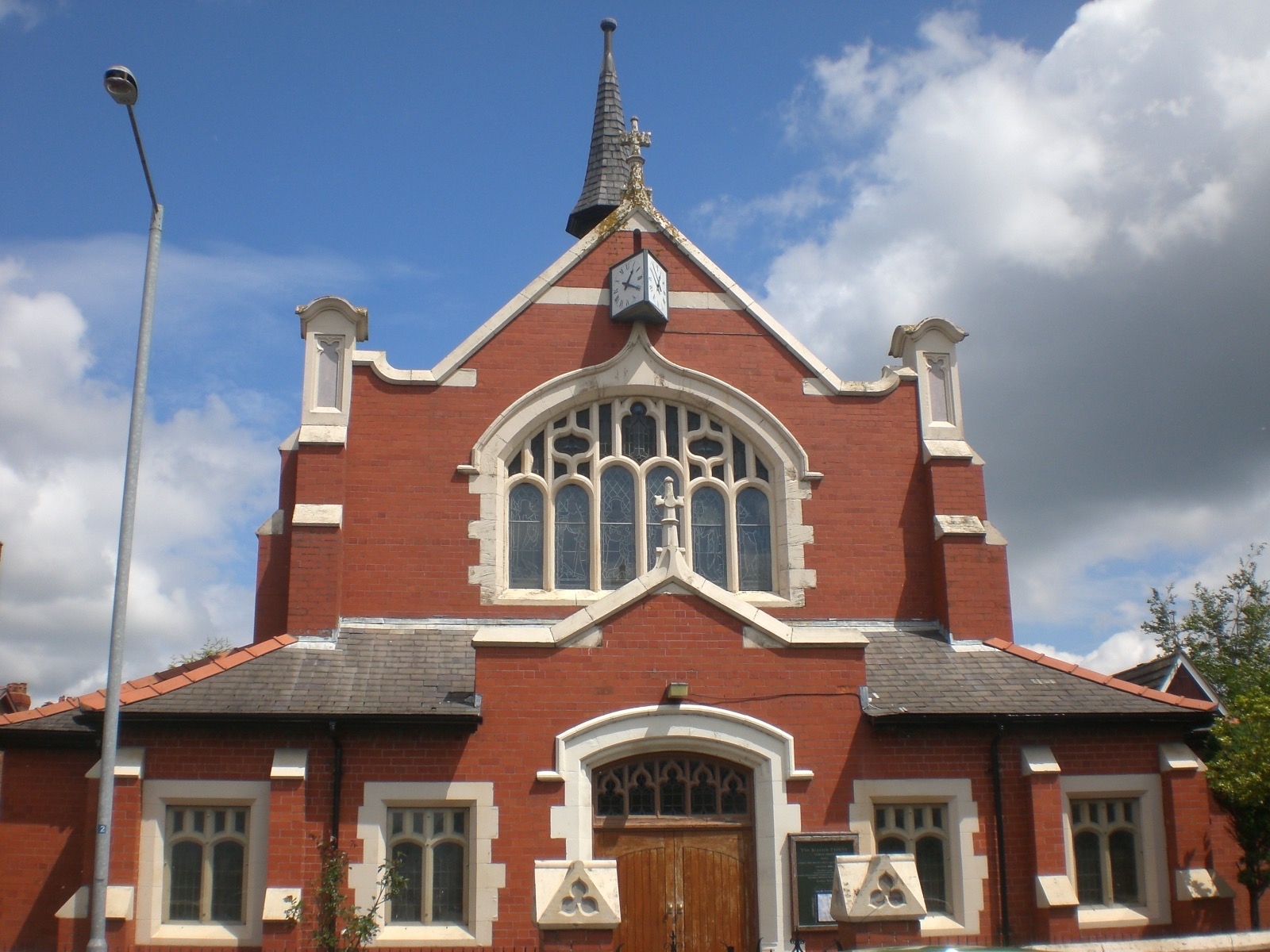
Blessed Trinity, Queensferry

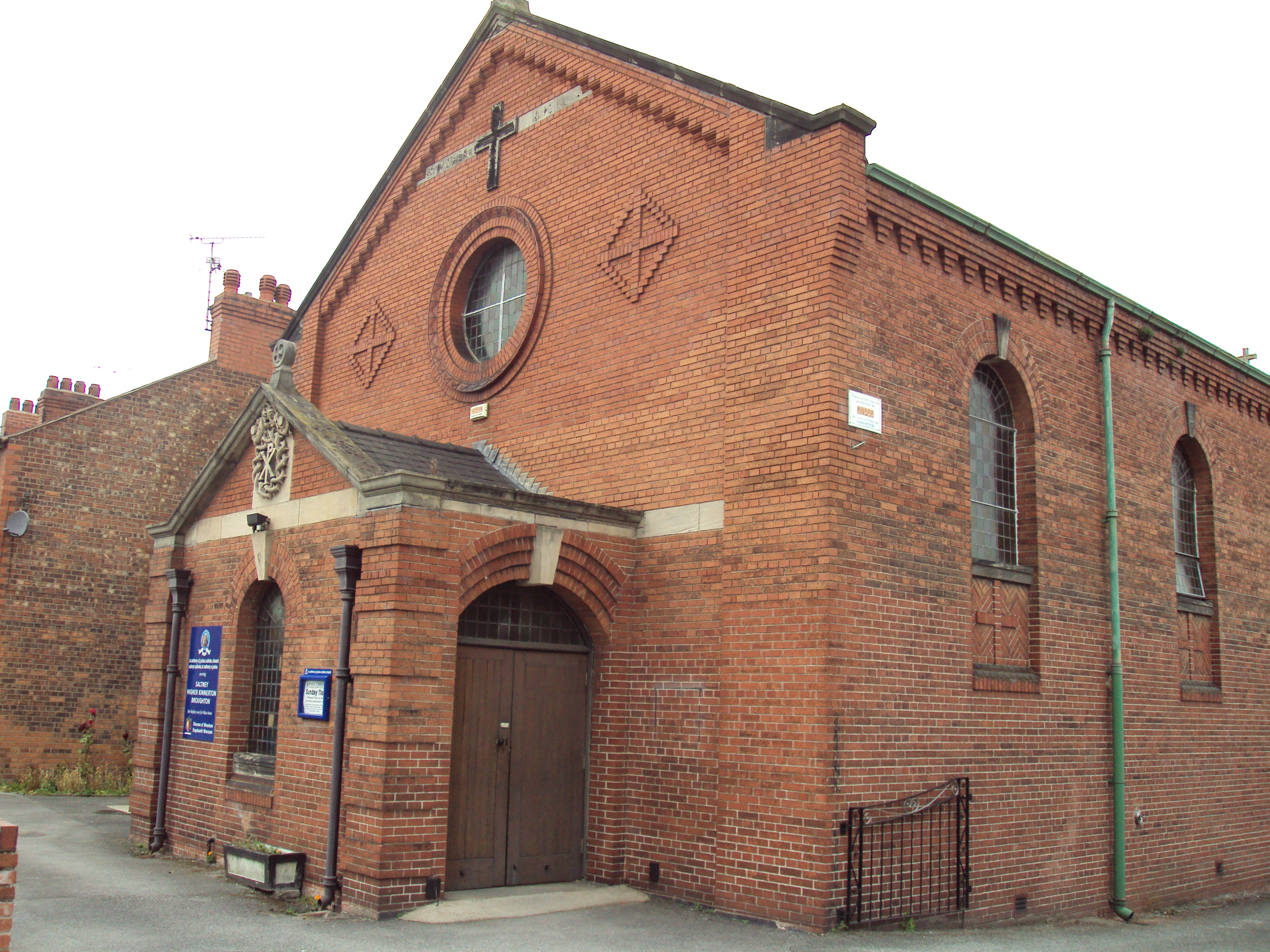
St Anthony of Padua, Saltney
