= List of hospitals in Guyana =

This is a list of hospitals in Guyana. The following hospitals are located in Guyana:

Hospital	City	Region	Facility Type
Kumaka / Moruca		1	District Hospital
Mabaruma		1	Regional Hospital
Pakera/Matthew Ridge		1	District Hospital
Port Kaituma		1	District Hospital
Charity		2	District Hospital
Suddie		2	Hospital
Leguan		3	District Hospital
Wakenaam		3	District Hospital
West Demerara Regional Hospital		3	Regional Hospital
Dr. CC. Nicholson		4	District Hospital
Fort Wellington		5	District Hospital
Mibicuri		6	District Hospital
National Ophthalmology Centre		6	Referral Centre
National Psychiatric Hospital		6	Referral Centre
New Amsterdam Public Hospital		6	Regional Hospital
Port Mourant		6	District Hospital
Skeldon		6	District Hospital
Bartica		7	Regional Hospital
Kamarang		7	District Hospital
Mahdia		8	District Hospital
Kato		8	Cottage Hospital
Aishalton		9	District Hospital
Lethem		9	Regional Hospital
Kwakwani Hospital		10	District Hospital
Linden Hospital Complex		10	Regional Hospital
Wismar Hospital		10	District Hospital
Georgetown Public Hospital	Georgetown	4	Main Referral Hospital
Balwant Singh Hospital	Georgetown	4	Private Hospital
Davis Memorial Hospital	Georgetown	4	Private Hospital
Prasad's Hospital	Georgetown	4	Private Hospital
St. Joseph Mercy Hospital, Catholic non-profit hospital	Georgetown	4	Private Hospital
Woodland Hospital	Georgetown	4	Private Hospital
Medical Arts Center	Georgetown	4	Private Hospital

== Defunct Hospitals ==
- Mahaica Hospital, Mahaica. A leprosy hospital established in British Guiana. Upon closure, services moved to The Palms, a geriatric home.
- The planned construction of the Speciality Hospital at Liliendaal, East Coast Demerara was cancelled in 2017.
