= St. Joseph Mercy Hospital =

Hospital in Georgetown, Guyana

- Shown in Guyana

Geography
- Location: Georgetown, Guyana
- Coordinates: 6.822472°N 58.160283°W

Organisation
- Type: Non-profit

Services
- Beds: 70

History
- Founded: 1945

Links
- Website: http://mercyhospital.gy/
- Lists: Hospitals in Guyana

St. Joseph Mercy Hospital is a Catholic hospital. It is Located on Parade Street, Kingston in Georgetown, Guyana. It was established by the members of the Sword of the Spirit movement and was officially opened in 1945. The hospital includes a School of Nursing. The oldest wing of the hospital burnt down on 10 May 2010, at 7 am. In 2020, the hospital opened a specialized COVID-19 treatment ward.
