= Rhyl Deanery =

The Rhyl Deanery is a Roman Catholic deanery in the Diocese of Wrexham that covers several churches in Conwy and Denbighshire.

The dean is centred at St Winefride Church in St Asaph.

== Churches ==
- St Therese of Lisieux, Abergele
- Christ the King, Towyn – served from Abergele
- St Joseph, Denbigh
- Ss Peter and Frances, Prestatyn
- Our Lady of the Assumption, Rhyl
- Our Lady Help of Christians, Ruthin
- St Winefride, St Asaph
- St Illtyd, Rhuddlan – served from St Asaph
- St Beuno, Tremeirchion – served by the Jesuits

== Gallery ==
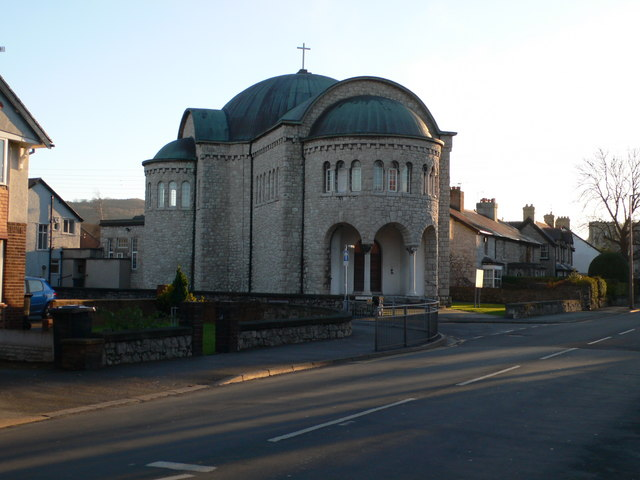
St Therese of Lisieux, Abergele

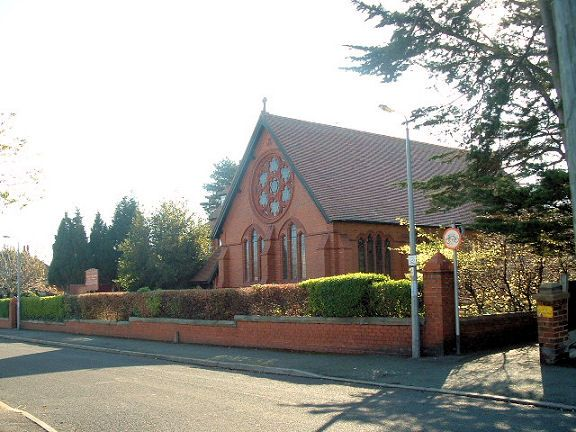
Ss Peter and Frances Church, Prestatyn

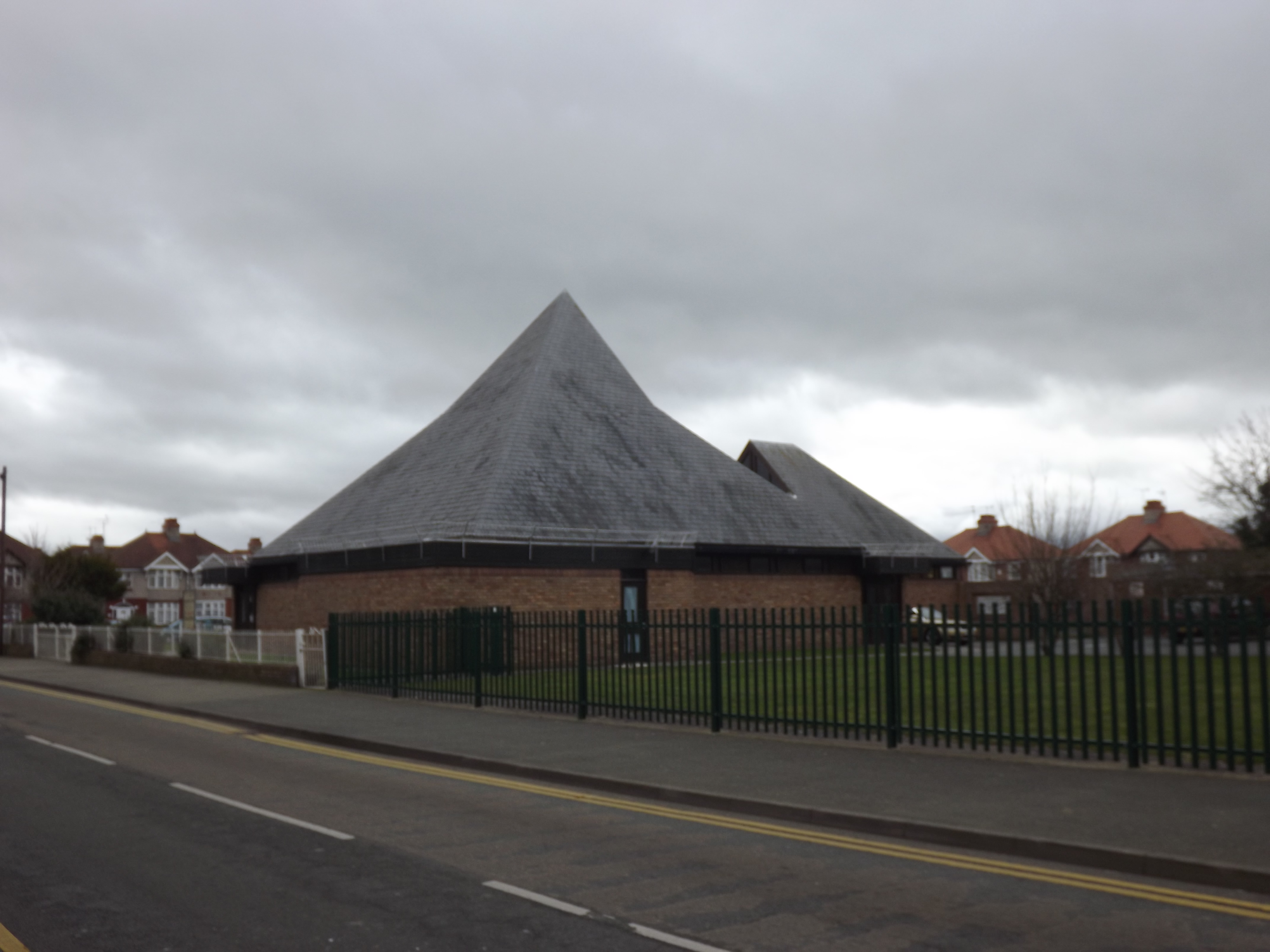
Our Lady of the Assumption, Rhyl

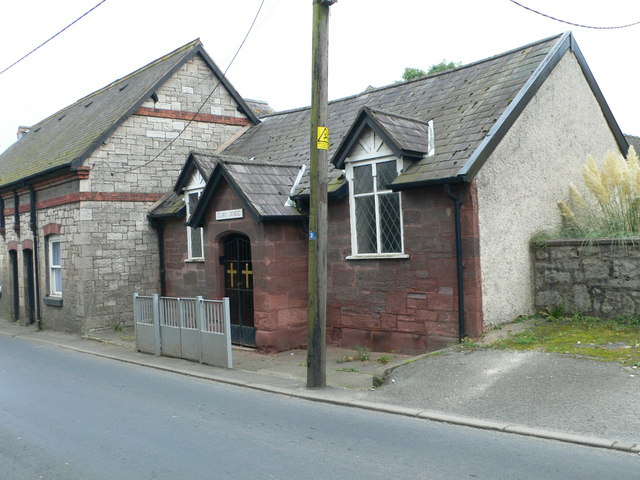
Our Lady Help of Christians, Ruthin

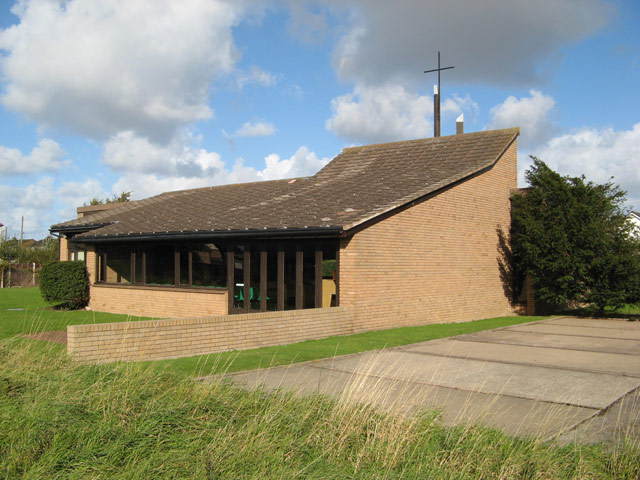
Christ the King, Towyn

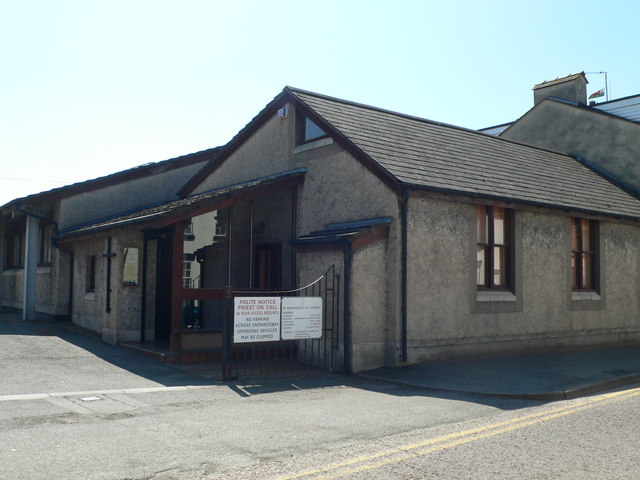
St Winefride, St Asaph

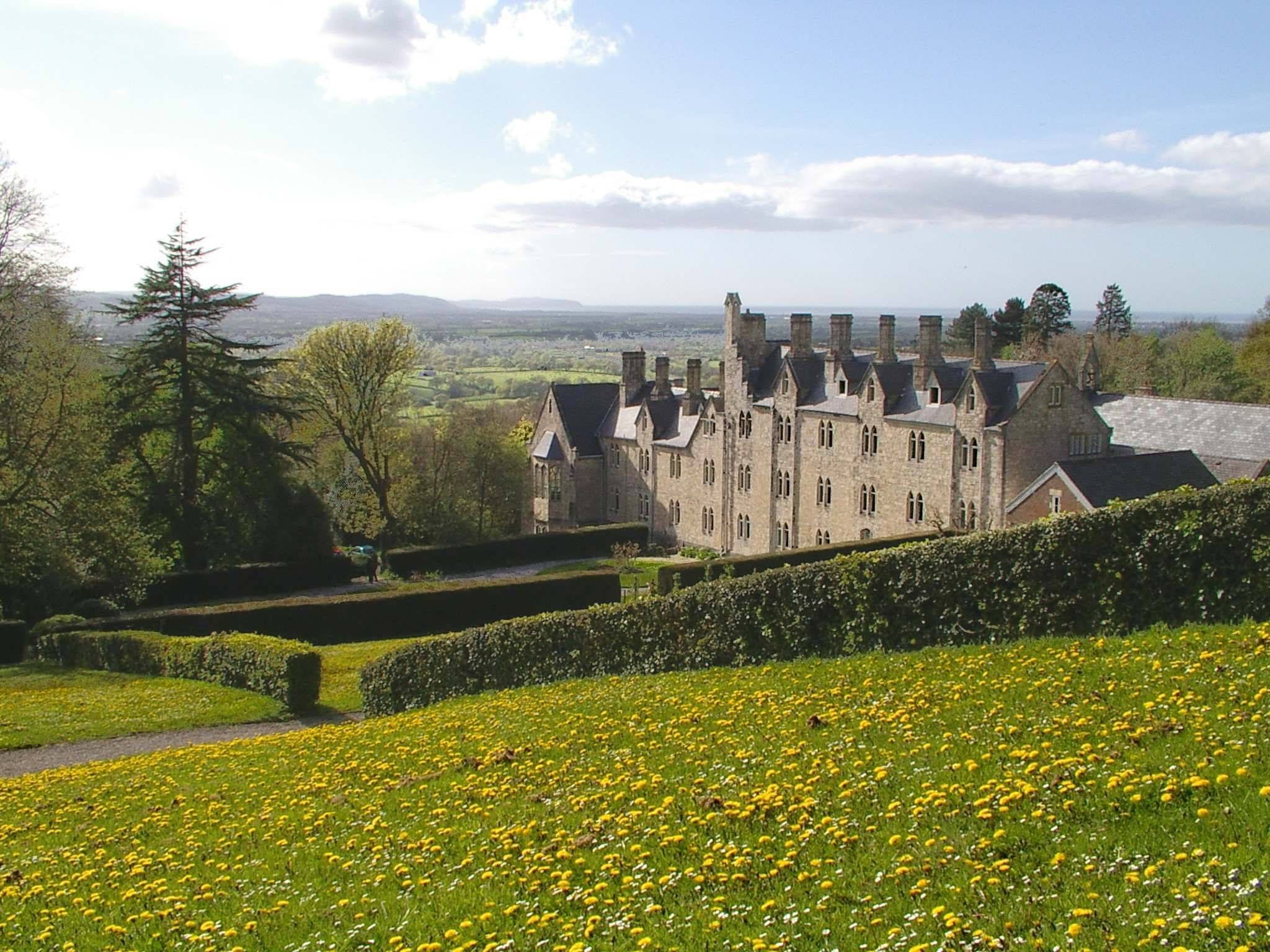
St Beuno's Ignatian Spirituality Centre
