= Our Lady of the Assumption Church, Rhyl =

Our Lady of the Assumption Church
- St Mary's Church
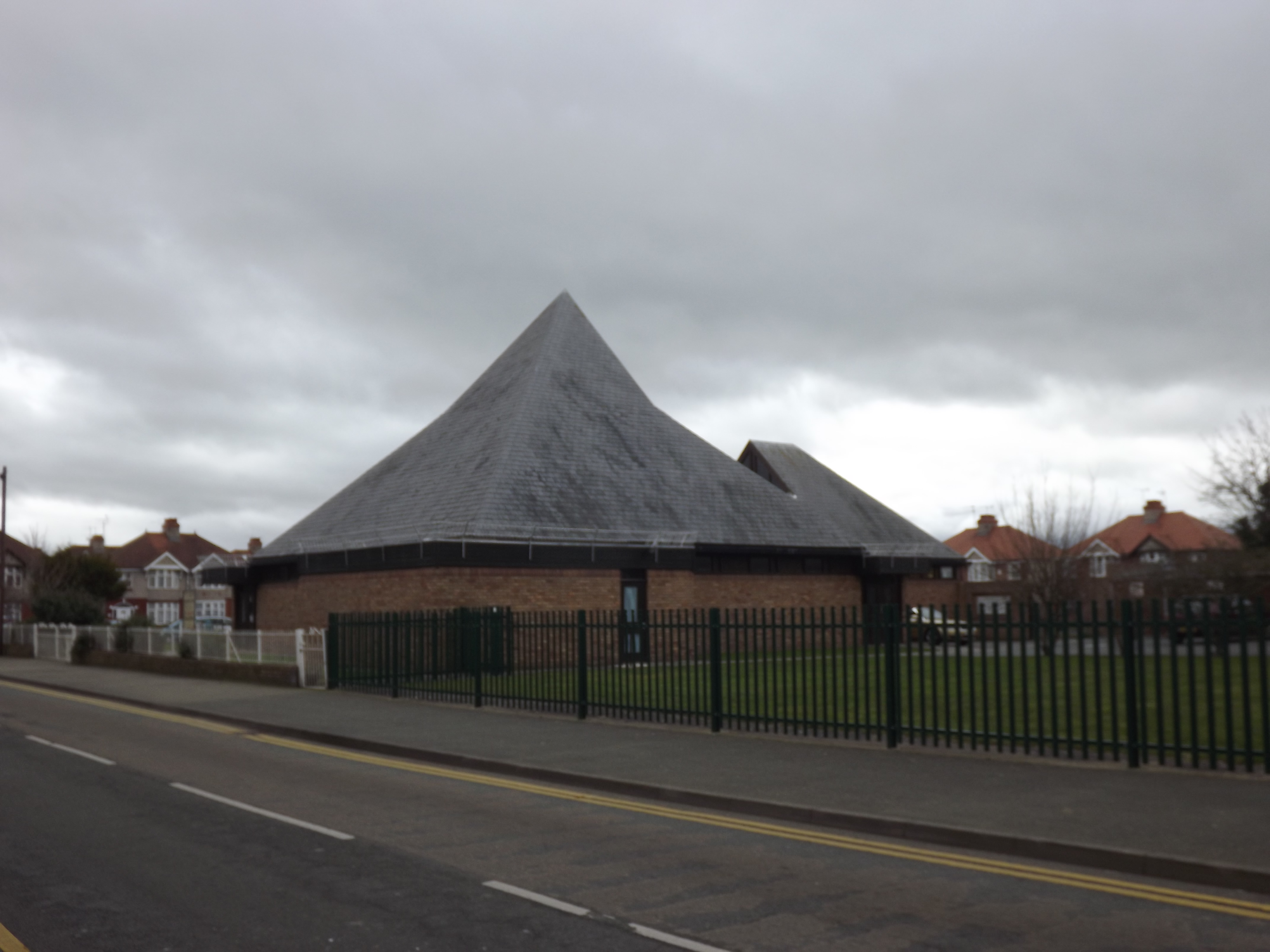
- View from the road
- Our Lady of the Assumption Church
- 53.316705°N 3.494595°W
- Location: Rhyl, Denbighshire
- Country: Wales
- Denomination: Roman Catholic
- Website: CatholicChurchRhyl.co.uk

History
- Status: Active
- Founded: 1851
- Founder: Society of Jesus
- Dedication: Assumption of Mary

Architecture
- Functional status: Parish church
- Groundbreaking: 1973
- Construction cost: £230,000

Administration
- Province: Cardiff
- Diocese: Wrexham
- Deanery: Rhyl Deanery

Our Lady of the Assumption Church, also known as St Mary's Church, is a Roman Catholic Parish church in Rhyl, Denbighshire. It was founded in 1851 by the Society of Jesus and was rebuilt in 1973. The original foundation was the first church the Jesuits built in Wales after establishing St Beuno's College in 1848.

== History ==
=== Foundation ===
The Jesuits from St Beuno's College started a mission to the Catholics in Rhyl in 1851. Masses were held in a local pub. Afterwards the local Assembly Rooms in the town centre (which is now occupied by Jobcentre Plus) were rented to serve as a church and a school. In 1854, the Jesuits purchased a site on Ffynnongroew Road which could accommodate 150 people. In 1861, it became apparent that a church with a larger capacity was needed. In 1862, it was decided to build a church on the corner of Ffynnongroew Road and Wellington Road. The old chapel became a primary school. On 3 March 1863, the foundation stone was laid by James Brown, Roman Catholic Bishop of Shrewsbury. It opened on 8 December. The church contained a window designed by John Hungerford Pollen, father of a Jesuit, also called John Hungerford Pollen.

=== Rebuilding ===
At some point in the 20th century, the Jesuits handed over the administration of the church to the Diocese of Wrexham who continue to serve the parish.

In 1955, the old school that was housed in the original parish chapel had to be moved, as the building was in a state of disrepair. A new school, Ysgol Mair, was built and the old school became the church hall. In 1973, the church was considered to be structurally unsafe. A new church had to be built. The old church hall was demolished and it became the site of the new church. Building work started that year and was completed on 21 December. The cost of construction was £230,000.

== Parish ==
The church has one Sunday Mass at 10:00am. There are weekday Masses at 9:30am from Tuesday to Friday.

== See also ==
- St Beuno's Jesuit Spirituality Centre
- List of churches in Denbighshire
