= St Wilfrid's Church, Preston =

Church in Preston, Lancashire, England

Coordinates: 53.757478°N 2.702855°W

St. Wilfrid's Preston
- Catholic Church of Saint Wilfrid, Preston
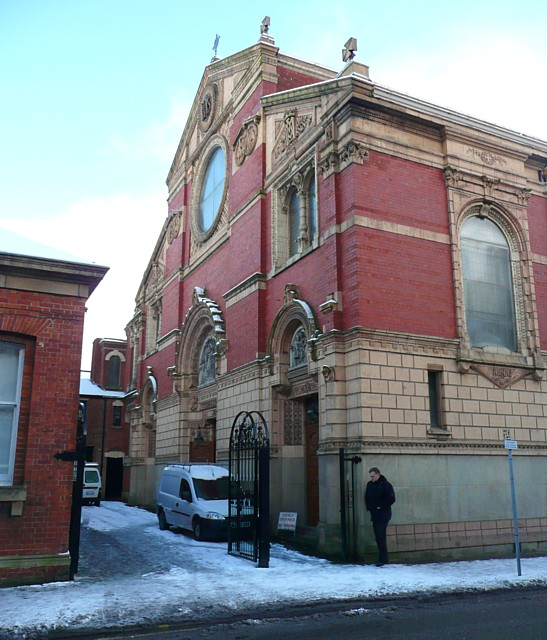
- North end of St Wilfrid's Church, Chapel Street, Preston

- Location in Preston
- OS grid reference: SD5376529221
- Location: Preston, Lancashire
- Country: England
- Denomination: Roman Catholic
- Website: http://stwilfridsparish.uk/

History
- Status: Active
- Founded: April 1792
- Founder: Fr Joseph 'Daddy' Dunn
- Dedication: St Wilfrid
- Events: Remodelled 1879–80; Renovated 1996

Architecture
- Functional status: Parish church
- Heritage designation: Grade II*
- Designated: 27 September 1979
- Architect(s): Ignatius Scoles and Samuel Joseph Nicholl
- Style: Neo-classical
- Completed: June 1794
- Construction cost: £4,000

Administration
- Province: Liverpool
- Diocese: Lancaster
- Deanery: Preston

Saint Wilfrid's Church is a Roman Catholic church run by the Society of Jesus, in the city centre of Preston, Lancashire, England. It was built in 1793 and is situated between Fishergate and Winckley Square on Chapel Street.

== Dedication ==
The church is dedicated to Wilfrid (c.633–c.709), an English bishop and saint. He founded a monastic community in Ripon and was Bishop of Northumbria from 664–668 and 714–732.

Saint Wilfrid must have had a particular devotion in Preston, because the original parish church, the present-day St. John's Minster, was originally called St Wilfrid's. However, it changed its dedication to St. John the Baptist in 1581, and again to St. John the Evangelist in 1770, meaning that when St. Wilfrid's church was built in 1793, there was no confusion between the two.

== History ==
=== Founding ===
The first post-reformation Catholic church in Preston was established by Jesuits in 1761, St Mary's in Friargate.

This church, now demolished, soon became too small and was replaced by St Wilfrid's which was begun in April 1792 and finished 14 months later and cost £4,000.

The church was built before the Restoration of the English Catholic hierarchy, which probably explains why such a large church is relatively discreet in the landscape of Preston city centre. Instead of being at right-angles to the street, it is parallel and does not have a surrounding green space or a spire to make it more distinctive.

The driving force behind the building of the church was Father Joseph 'Daddy' Dunn, a Jesuit who continued ministering as a Catholic priest during the suppression of the Society of Jesus.

The first stage of building the church was to have plain brick edifice with a balcony around the three sides facing the altar inside. However, soon the congregation outgrew the church and it was decided not only that the church needed expanding, but it needed to be grander.

=== Remodelling ===
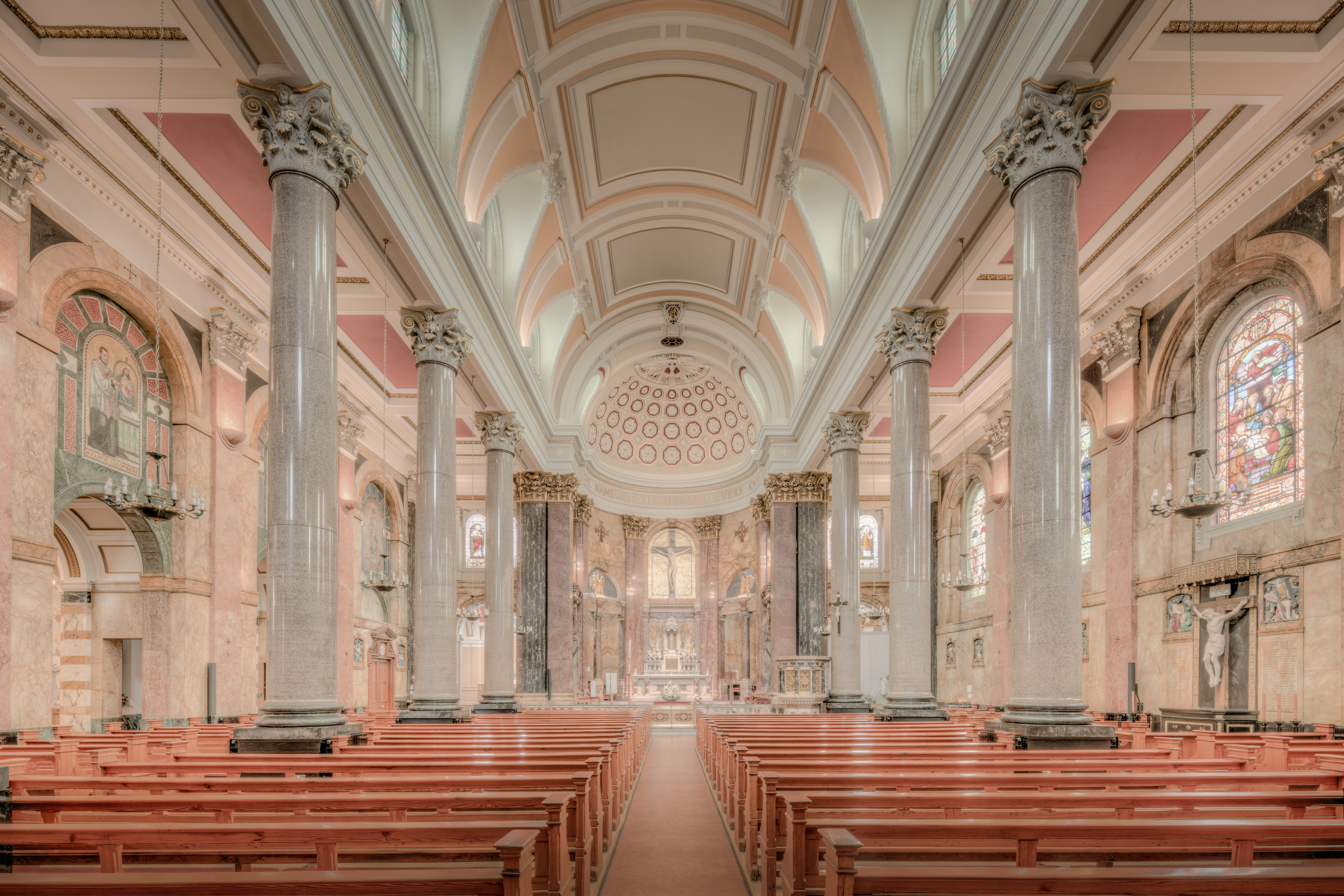
Church interior

In 1878 a new 'sodality' chapel and confessionals were added and the inside of the church was remodelled. One of the architects of this remodelling was in fact a Jesuit priest, Fr. Ignatius Scoles SJ, son of the architect Joseph John Scoles, who designed the Church of the Immaculate Conception, Farm Street in London, St Ignatius Church in Preston and the Church of St Francis Xavier in Liverpool. This new stage of building work was finished in 1880.

Ten years later, stone cladding and terracotta and stone carvings were added to the exterior and elaborate marbles from all over Europe were fixed to the interior walls and columns. The final church, after renovations of 1996, still looks fresh and bright.

Unusually for a Catholic church today, St Wilfrid's was never really re-ordered for the post-Vatican II liturgy. It retains the altar rails and high altar with very little modification.

== Ministry ==
The church is still administered by the Society of Jesus whose community is next door on Winckley Square, and who ran the nearby Preston Catholic College until its closure in 1978. The church itself is open daily during shopping hours and is a place of quiet and prayer for young and old alike.

The adjacent parish centre hosts various activity groups, such as the local Society of Saint Vincent de Paul and Christian Life Community. It also houses a sanctuary bookshop which sells religious items such as rosaries, missals and crucifixes.

== Gallery ==
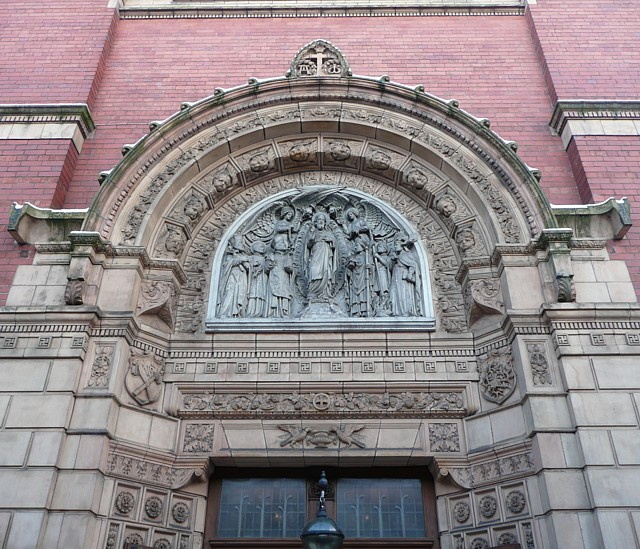
Entrance to the church

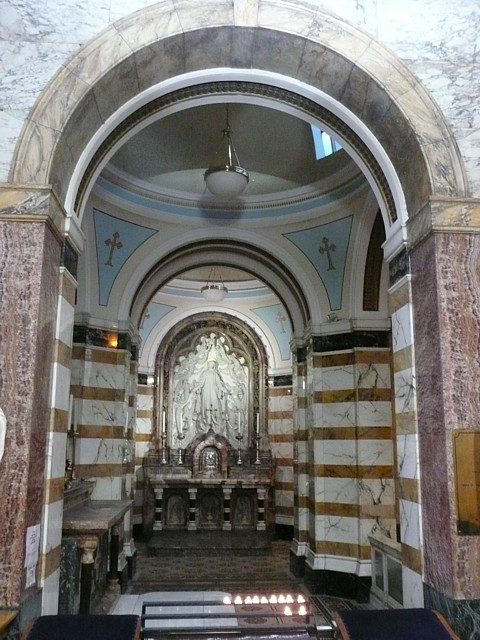
Side chapel in church

== See also ==
- Listed buildings in Preston, Lancashire
- Diocese of Lancaster
- List of Jesuit sites in the United Kingdom
- List of Catholic churches in the United Kingdom
