= Georgetown Public Hospital =

Hospital in Georgetown, Guyana

- Shown in Georgetown, Guyana

Geography
- Location: Georgetown, Guyana, Guyana
- Coordinates: 6.816405°N 58.156482°W

Organisation
- Type: General

Services
- Emergency department: Yes
- Beds: 600

History
- Founded: 1838

Links
- Lists: Hospitals in Guyana

Georgetown Public Hospital (GPHC), in Georgetown, Guyana, is the country's largest hospital. GPHC is the main teaching hospital in Guyana and serves as both a regional public hospital and as the national referral hospital.

Its Seaman's Ward, the oldest section, was constructed in 1838. The hospital is government-run with a capacity of 600 beds, although in 2005 not all were used due to staff shortages. GPHC's emergency department has an estimated annual volume of 75,000.

Guyana's first open-heart surgery was performed at the GPHS's Caribbean Heart Institute in 2007. In 2008, the first kidney transplant operation in Guyana was performed at the GPHC by US Army medical professionals for training and humanitarian purposes.

In 2010, GPHC began an Emergency Medicine training program. In 2015, GPHC received GY$80M worth of equipment from China for setting up a trauma centre.

The first abdominal aortic aneurysm repair surgery in Guyana was performed at GPHC in 2020.

== History ==
Georgetown hospital was a colonial hospital built primarily for the care of the Europeans. By the time of emancipation in 1838, the hospital mainly served poorer Europeans and sailors and saw as few as 30 patients a day, very few of whom were women. The hospital had an attached dispensary, but was rarely used; according to a report by the Colonial Surgeon in 1840 listed that it was only used by 216 individuals. The hospital expanded in 1846 to accommodate the increase in patients of mostly Portuguese descent, who had been brought into the colony to work. In 1847, large numbers of Indian laborers were treated at the hospital. Breakdowns of patient demographics showed that those in the professional class sought medical care elsewhere, but admissions of skilled laborers indicated the hospital was serving more residents of Georgetown.

The expansion of the 1840s continued until the early 1900s, and patients from more walks of life were being treated and the hospital had the capacity to support 700 beds. A maternity ward existed as early as 1873, and upgrades in 1894 saw sixteen maternity beds, a two-bed delivery room and post-natal care, and distinct from its English counter-parts, was provided free with no requirement of marriage license. A children's ward came soon after.. Paying patients were afforded perks to their care, such as privacy and improved food. The hospital also referred patients to other institutions, such as the Alms House, Leper Asylum, Orphanage and Lunatic Asylum that existed at the time. Common surgical procedures included "incision of abscesses, amputations (often the result of chronic ulceration), reducing ‘elephantoid’ tissue and managing ulcers". Use of the hospital's dispensary grew: roughly 33,000 out-patients’ prescriptions were recorded for 1901.

Midwifery was regulated in 1900 later by 1905 a program was started to license women from remote districts. Georgetown Hospital was training about 40 such women per year.
