= Immaculate Conception Cathedral, Georgetown =

Cathedral in Georgetown, Guyana

Brickdam Cathedral
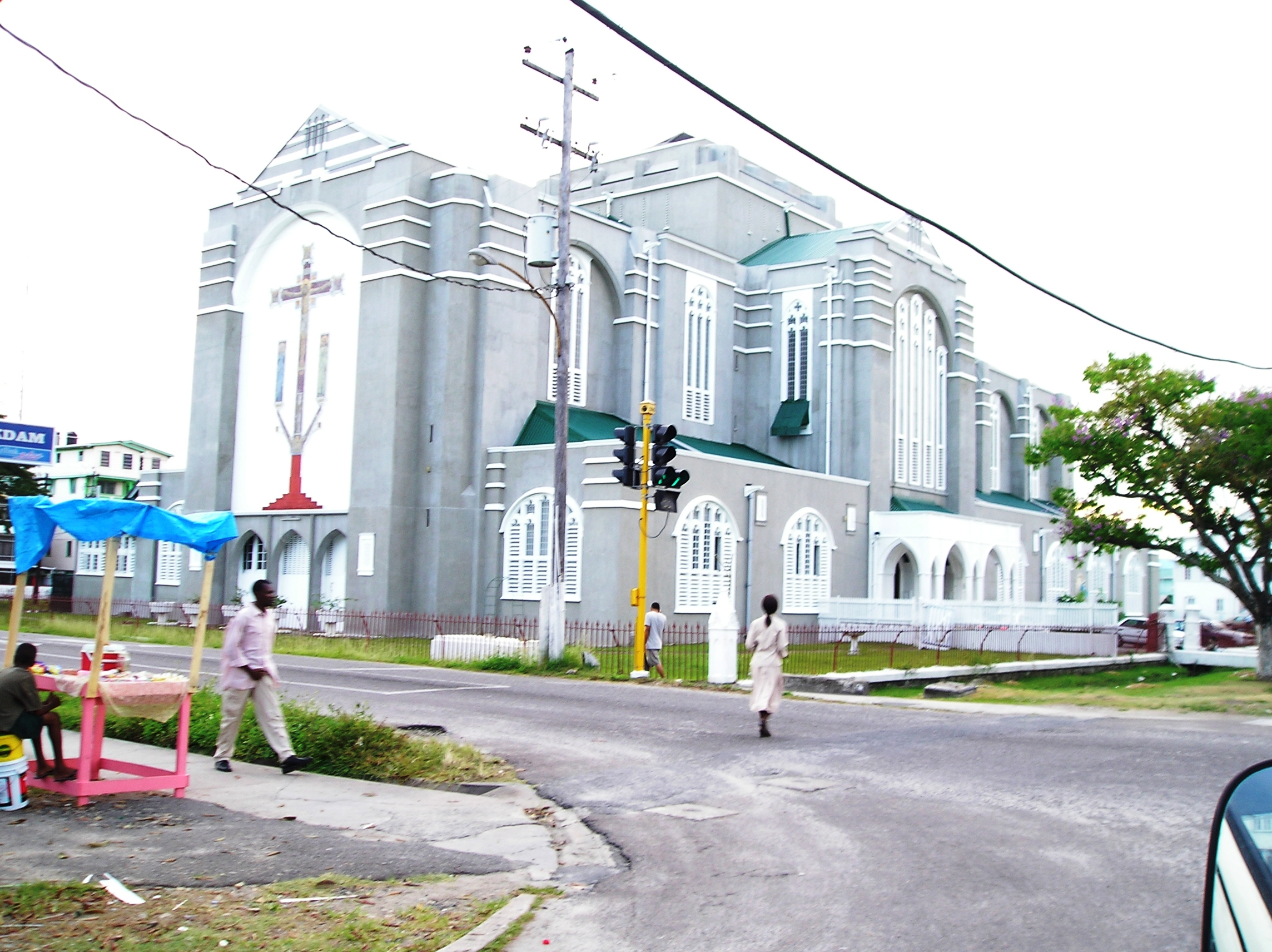

Religion
- Affiliation: Catholic
- Rite: Roman
- Ecclesiastical or organisational status: Cathedral
- Year consecrated: 1921
- Status: Active

Location
- Interactive map of Brickdam Cathedral
- Coordinates: 6.807456°N 58.16204°W

Brickdam Cathedral, more formally known as the Cathedral of Immaculate Conception, is the Roman Catholic cathedral in Georgetown, Guyana, and is the leading Catholic church of the country. Built in the 1920s, it is constructed in a Romanesque architectural style designed by Leonard Stokes, and is 200 feet long and 1,000 feet wide. The centre ceiling is 60 feet 6 inches high, and the dome reaches 74 feet 10 inches.
