= Rupununi savannah =

Savanna plain in Upper Takutu-Upper Essequibo, Guyana

Coordinates: 2°45′N 59°45′W

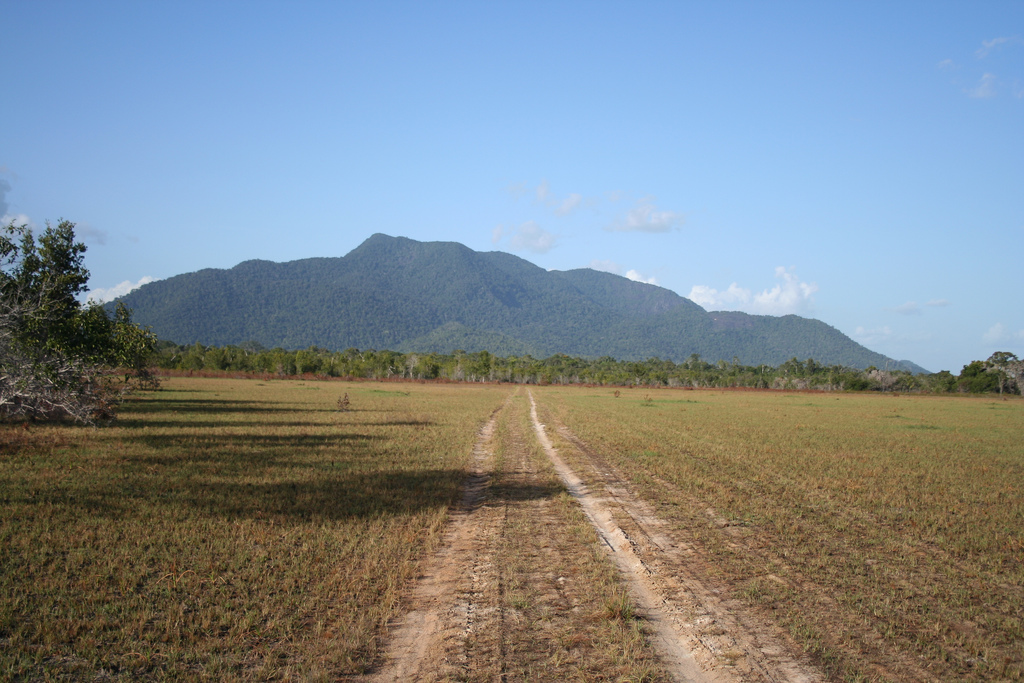

Ecology
- Biome: Tropical and subtropical grasslands, savannas, and shrublands

Geography
- Area: 13,000 km^{2} (5,000 mi^{2})
- Country: Guyana
- State: Upper Takutu-Upper Essequibo

The Rupununi savannah /rʌpəˈnʌni/ is a savanna plain in Guyana, in the Upper Takutu-Upper Essequibo region. It is part of the Guianan savanna ecoregion of the tropical and subtropical grasslands, savannas, and shrublands biome.

== Description ==
The Rupununi Savannah is located between the Rupununi River and the border with Brazil and Venezuela. The Rupununi forms the southwestern wilderness territory of Guyana, a South American country situated on the Northeastern littoral of South America. The savannah is dissected by the Kanuku Mountains. The Rupununi Savannah encompasses 5000 square miles of virtually untouched grasslands, swamplands, rain-forested mountains. The region usually floods in the wet season (May to August). Early European explorers believed that the Rupununi floodplains were the legendary Lake Parime.

== Biodiversity ==
The savannah is divided north from south, by the Kanuku Mountains, Guyana's most biologically diverse region. According to Conservation International, the "area supports a large percentage of Guyana’s biodiversity", including 250 species of bird life, 18 of which are native "only to the lowland forests of the Guianas." The savannah is teeming with wildlife, including a large variety of bird species. The savannah is also home to the jaguar as well as the Harpy Eagle, the world's most powerful bird of prey, an extremely rare and endangered species which once ranged the forests of South America and is found in the Rupununi/Kanuku mountain range. Conservation International Guyana maintains an office in Lethem in the Rupununi and has supported community conservation and protected-area management activities in southern Guyana.

== Population ==
The Rupununi is the home of the Wapishana, Macushi, Wai-Wai and Patamona peoples. In 2012, the population of Amerindians in the Rupununi was estimated at 20,808 people. The Wapishana live mainly in the south savannah, the Macushi in the north. Some 200 Wai-Wai live in near isolation in Kanashen, the remote southeastern region bordering Brazil virtually untouched by modern life.

The major occupations or industries in the Rupununi Savannah are cattle ranching for beef, Balatá bleeding to extract latex; farming groundnuts, maize (corn), cassava, and vegetables; fishing and hunting; and craft work such as the manufacture of hammocks, leather articles, Nibbi furniture and beadwork).

There are Amerindian villages dotted throughout the Rupununi Savannah, as well as many ranches worked by vaqueros (cowboys), some of whom are descendants of 19th century Scottish settlers. The main town is Lethem, located beside the Takutu River, on the border with Brazil. Owing to the savanna's remoteness from the rest of the country most trade is conducted with Brazil and most people speak Portuguese.

In 1969 some ranchers started what has been referred to as the Rupununi Uprising. The revolt was quelled within a few days.

== Ecotourism ==
The Rupununi region caters towards ecotourists. It is designated a "protected area" by the government of Guyana, housing some 80% of the mammals and 60% of the bird life found in Guyana's tropical forests and savannahs. Several Lodges welcome guests, for example Dadanawa Ranch or Karanambu ranch.

The Rupununi is accessible by small aircraft and helicopter flights regularly available from Guyana's capital Georgetown on the Atlantic coast. In the dry season it is accessible by an unpaved "all-weather" road using trucks or 4x4 vehicles. It takes about 48 hours of tough driving. Heavy flooding makes this drive unpredictable and dangerous in the rainy season during the months of April to June.
