= Shell Beach =

Shell Beach may refer to:

== Places ==
=== United States ===
- Shell Beach, Pismo Beach, California, a neighborhood of Pismo Beach
- Shell Beach, La Jolla, California, a beach
- Shell Beach, Louisiana, an unincorporated community

=== Elsewhere ===
- Shell Beach (Western Australia), a beach
- Shell Beach (Southern Australia), a beach of Spencer Gulf
- Shell Beach, a camping site on Portland Island (British Columbia), Canada
- Shell Beach, Guyana, a beach

== Other uses ==
- Shell Beach (band), a post-hardcore band from Hungary
- A fictional place in the 1998 movie Dark City
