= Telephone numbers in Guyana =

- Country: Guyana
- Continent: South America
- Country code: +592
- International access: 00

Telephone numbers in Guyana use the country calling code +592 and the international call prefix 00. The national numbering plan uses seven-digit national significant numbers; Guyana completed its transition from a mixed five-, six-, and seven-digit system to a fully seven-digit system on 1 February 2001. Number portability for both fixed-line and mobile services was introduced in 2025.

Fixed and fixed-wireless numbers are allocated among numerous geographic localities using three-digit billing prefixes, while cellular GSM allocations include prefixes from 600 to 699. The numbering plan also provides special and general-service numbers, including 911 for police emergencies, 912 for fire and ambulance emergencies, 913 for ambulance emergencies, and 914 for the domestic-violence hotline.

== Numbering in Guyana ==
Country Code: +592
International Call Prefix: 00

National Significant Numbers (NSN): seven digits.

The numbering plan for Guyana transitioned to a fully 7-digit system from a hybrid plan using a mix of 5, 6 and 7 digits, completing the switchover on 1 February 2001. Number portability for both landline and cellular services was introduced in 2025.

== Allocations ==
=== New number ranges introduced December 2009 ===
Location	Billing Prefix Assigned	DN Range Assigned	Notes
Mocha E.B.D.	217	0XXX	(new wire-line switch)
Mocha E.B.D.	217	1XXX	(new wire-line switch)
Crabwood Creek, Corentyne	335	1XXX	(upgrade)
Hope West, E.C.D.	256	5XXX	(upgrade)
Enterprise E.C.D.	229	8XXX	(upgrade)
Belladrum W.C.B.	232	4XXX	(upgrade)

=== Allocations December 2009 ===
Location	Billing Prefix Assigned	DN Range Assigned	Cut-Over Date
Mabaruma	777	5XXX-9XXX	18.I.2001
Port Kaituma	777	0XXX-4XXX	18.I.2001
Matthews Ridge	775	0XXX-2XXX	18.I.2001
Vreed-en-Hoop	264	0XXX-3XXX	21.X.2004
New Road/Best	254	0XXX-2XXX	XI.2001
La Grange	253	0XXX	
Goed Fortuin	253	3XXX	
Leonora	268	0XXX-4XXX	II.2001
Windsor Forest	269	0XXX-1XXX	21.X.2004
Met-en-Meer-Zorg	275	0XXX-1XXX	XI.2001
Anna Catherina/ Cornelia Ida	276	0XXX-1XXX	21.X.2004
Hague/Fellowship	276	3XXX-4XXX	13.XII.2004
Zeeburg	277	0XXX-1XXX	21.X.2004
Uitvlugt	277	3XXX – 4XXX	21.X.2004
Tuschen	260	1XXX – 2XXX	1.II.2001
Parika	260	3XXX – 4XXX	1.II.2001
Parika	262	0XXX	
Good Hope	279	0XXX	
Stanleytown	279	3XXX	
Wales	267	0XXX – 2XXX	1.II.2001
Canal No. 1	271	1XXX	
Canal No. 2	271	3XXX	
Georgetown	223	0XXX – 9XXX	1.II.2001
Georgetown	225	0XXX – 9XXX	1.II.2001
Georgetown	226	0XXX – 9XXX	1.II.2001
Georgetown	502	0XXX – 9XXX	1.II.2019
Georgetown	227	0XXX – 9XXX	1.II.2001
Georgetown	231	0XXX – 9XXX	21.X.2004
Diamond/Grove	216	0XXX – 9XXX	
Mocha	217	0XXX – 1XXX	28.XII.2009
Georgetown (S/R/Veldt)	218	0XXX – 9XXX	11.II.2004
Georgetown	219	0XXX	1.II.2001
Sophia	219	1XXX – 9XXX	
Agricola/Houston	233	0XXX – 1XXXX	
Eccles	233	2XXX – 3XXX	13.XII.2004
Nandy Park	233	5XXX – 7XXX	XI.2001
Diamond	265	0XXX – 7XXX	16.X.2006
New Hope/Friendship/Grove	266	0XXX – 4XXX	16.X.2006
Land of Canaan	266	5XXX	
Timehri	261	0XXX – 4XXX	1.II.2001
Soesdyke	261	5XXX – 6XXX	
Long Creek	261	7XXX – 8XXX	
B/V West	222	0XXX – 9XXX	1.II.2001
B/V West	272	0XXX	1.II.2001
B/V Central	220	0XXX – 9XXX	1.II.2001
B/V Central	234	0XXX – 1XXX	XI.2001
Melanie	270	0XXX – 3XXX	1.II.2001
Non Pariel	270	4XXX – 5XXX	
Enmore	270	6XXX – 8XXX	1 .II.2001
Vigilance	274	0XXX – 1XXX	
Enterprise	229	6XXX – 8XXX	1.II.2001
Paradise	255	0XXX – 1XXX	
Cove & John	229	1XXX – 5XXX	1.II.2001
Golden Grove/Haslington	255	3XXX	
Victoria	256	0XXX – 1XXX	
Hope West	256	3XXX – 5XXX	
Clonbrook	259	0XXX – 1XXX	21.X.2004
Unity	259	3XXX	
Mahaica	228	1XXX – 3XXX	1.II.2001
Belmont	228	5XXX	
Cane Grove	257	0XXX	
Strangroen	257	3XXX	
Planters Hall	258	0XXX	
Mahaicony	221	2XXX – 3XXX	1.II.2001
Mortice	258	3XXX	
Novar/Catherine	232	1XXX – 2XXX	12.V.2004
Belladrum	232	3XXX – 4XXX	
Bush Lot	232	0XXX & 9XXX	12.V.2004
Rosignol	330	0XXX – 2XXX	
Blairmont	327	0XXX	
Shieldstown	327	5XXX	
Cottage	328	1XXX	
Tempe	328	2XXX – 3XXX	
Onverwagt	328	4XXX	
Bath/Waterloo	328	7XXX – 8XXX	
Willemstad	329	0XXX	
Fort Wellington	329	3XXX	
Ithaca	329	5XXX	
New Amsterdam	333	1XXX – 9XXX	1.II.2001
New Amsterdam	334	0XXX	
Cumberland	327	2XXX & 7XXX	21.X.2004
Adelphi	326	0XXX – 1XXX	
Sheet Anchor	332	0XXX – 1XXX	
Susannah	332	3XXX	
Edinburg	336	5XXX	
Whim/Bloomfield	337	1XXX – 2XXX	1.II.2001
Liverpool	337	3XXX	
Rose Hall	337	4XXX – 5XXX	1.II.2001
Port Mourant	336	6XXX – 8XXX	1.II.2001
Kilcoy	322	0XXX – 1XXXX	15.XI.2004
Nigg	322	3XXX – 4XXX	
Hampshire	322	5XXX	
Fryish	326	2XXX	
No. 40	326	4XXX	
Adventure	331	0XXX	
Joanna	331	3XXX	
Mibikuri	325	0XXX	
No: 34	325	3XXX	
Joppa/Brighton	325	5XXX	
Benab/No. 65 Village	338	1XXX – 2XXX	1.II.2001
Massiah	338	4XXX	
No: 52	339	4XXX	
Skeldon	339	0XXX – 3XXX	1.II.2001
Crabwood Creek	335	0XXX – 1XXX	
No: 76	335	3XXX – 4XXX	
Bartica	455	0XXX – 3XXX	1.II.2001
Mahdia	456	0XXX	
Lethem	772	0XXX – 3XXX	15.I.2001
Aishalton	773	0XXX	
Linden	444	0XXX – 4XXX	1.II.2001
Linden	444	6XXX	1.II.2001
Canvas City	444	8XXX – 9XXX	
Wisroc	444	5XXX & 7XXXX	
Christianburg	442	0XXX-1XXX	1.II.2001
Amelia's Ward	442	3XXX – 4XXX	1.II.2001
Kwakwani	440	0XXX – 2XXX	24.I.2001
Ituni	441	0XXX – 2XXX	23.I.2001

=== Fixed Wireless Access Locations ===
Location	Billing Prefix Assigned	DN Range Assigned	Cut–Over Date
Georgetown	263	0XXX	1 February 2001
Wales	263	7XXX	1 February 2001
La Grange, Canal 1	263	4XXX – 5XXX	1 February 2001
Mocha	263	6XXX	1 February 2001
Mahaica	228	0XXX	
Cottage	328	0XXX	
New Amsterdam	333	0XXX	
No: 40	337	0XXX	
Tuschen	260	0XXX	
Friendship	774	0XXX	
Charity	771	0XXX	
Anna Regina	771	4XXX – 5XXX	1 February 2001
Suddie	774	4XXX – 5XXX	1 February 2001

=== General Services 2009 (Data, Toll Free, Calling Card, Voice Mail) ===
Location	Billing Prefix Assigned	DN Range Assigned
Debit Card	0171	
Voice Mail (wireline)	079	
Voice Mail (cellular)	0444; 0767	
IVR	093	
Directory Assistance and Enquiries	092	
International Operator Assistance	002	
International Time & Charges	094	
Fault Reporting	097	
Vandalism Hotline	0908	
Follow Fault Reporting	0907	
Call in Services	0801	
Before you dig hotline	0777	
Other Services	(+592) 888	8888
Other services	(+592) 900	8XXX
Data Services	273	1XXX
Call Booths	Wireline Prefix	9XXX
IFS	(+592) 862	1XXX
Replacement DN	289	0XXX – 4XXX
IFS-1 International Incoming Routing	289	5XXX – 9XXX

IFS – International Freephone Service (Toll Free)
For IFS international incoming routing number to Guyana the last four digits will be the subscriber (PSTN) number.

=== General Services 2008 (Data-Toll Free-Calling Card-Voice Mail) ===
Location	Existing Prefix	Existing Directory Number	Billing Prefix Assigned
Home Country			
Direct Services	Canada	161	
	UK	169	
	AT&T	159	
	MCI	177	
	Sprint	151,166	
	Sprint	172 – 176	
		178 – 179	
	International Collect	165	
SMS	Existing	158	
Special Services	Existing	155, 156	
Special Services	Future	150, 152 – 154	
Special Services	Future	157	
Before you Dig	0777		
ISP	868	XXXX	868

=== Cellular Service ===
Location	Existing Prefix	Existing Directory Number	Billing Prefix Assigned	DN Range Assigned
Cellular Allocation (GSM)			600 – 629; 630 – 639; 640 – 699	XXXX; XXXX; XXXX

Effective 1 December 2007, all cellular numbers are utilized for GSM service only. TDMA service is no longer provided.

== Emergency numbers ==
The national numbering plan lists the following contact numbers for the emergency services.

Emergency numbers in Guyana
Number	Service
911	Police emergency response
912	Fire / Ambulance emergency response
913	Ambulance emergency response
914	Domestic violence hotline

== See also ==
- Caribbean Telecommunications Union
