= Guyana =

Country in South America

Co-operative Republic of Guyana
- Flag Coat of arms
- Anthem: "Green Land of Guyana"
- Capital and largest city: Georgetown; 6°48′04″N 58°09′18″W
- Official languages: English
- Recognised regional languages: 10 Indigenous languages: Akawaio; Carib; Lokono; Macushi; Mawayana; Patamona; Pemon (Arekuna); Waiwai; Wapishana; Warao
- Vernacular language: Guyanese Creole
- Other languages: 5 languages: Dutch; Guyanese Hindustani; Chinese; Portuguese; Spanish
- Ethnic groups (2012): 39.8% Indian; 29.2% African; 20.0% Mixed (Note: incl. Douglas, Mulattos-Creoles, Afro-Asians, Anglo-Indian, Chindian, Luso-Indian, Maroons-Zambos, Mestizos, and Pardos); 10.5% Indigenous; 0.3% European (Note: incl. Portuguese); 0.2% Chinese
- Religion (2012): 63.95% Christianity; 24.8% Hinduism; 6.77% Islam; 3.14% no religion; 1.38% others
- Demonym: Guyanese
- Government: Parliamentary republic with an executive president
  - President: Irfaan Ali
  - Prime Minister and First Vice President: Mark Phillips
  - Second Vice President: Bharrat Jagdeo
  - Speaker of the National Assembly: Manzoor Nadir
  - Acting Chief Justice: Roxane George-Wiltshire
- Legislature: National Assembly

Establishment
  - Dutch control: 1616–1815
  - British Guiana: 1831–1966
  - Independence from the United Kingdom as Guyana: 26 May 1966
  - Republic: 23 February 1970
  - Constitution: 6 October 1980

Area
  - Total: 214,969 km^{2} (83,000 sq mi) (83rd)
  - Water (%): 8.4

Population
  - 2022 estimate: ▲878,674 (157th)
  - Density: 5.21/km^{2} (13.5/sq mi) (231st)
- GDP (PPP): 2026 estimate
  - Total: ▲$97.760 billion (110th)
  - Per capita: ▲$95,480 (8th)
- GDP (nominal): 2026 estimate
  - Total: ▲$33.960 billion (119th)
  - Per capita: ▲$33,176 (37th)
- Gini (2007): ▼44.6 medium inequality
- HDI (2023): ▲0.776 high (89th)
- Currency: Guyanese dollar (GYD)
- Time zone: UTC-04:00 (GYT)
- Date format: dd-mm-yyyy
- Calling code: +592
- Internet TLD: .gy

Guyana, officially the Co-operative Republic of Guyana, is a country in South America. It is bordered by the Atlantic Ocean to the north, Suriname to the east, Brazil to the south and southwest, and Venezuela to the west. It is part of the Guianas. The capital and largest city is Georgetown.

With a land area of 214,969 km^{2} (83,000 sq mi), Guyana is the third-smallest sovereign state by area in mainland South America after Uruguay and Suriname, and is the second-least populous sovereign state in South America after Suriname; it is also one of the least densely populated countries on Earth. The official language of the country is English, although a large part of the population is bilingual in English and the Indigenous languages. Guyana is the only country in mainland South America to have English as the official language. The majority of the population also speaks Guyanese Creole, which is an English-based creole. Guyana is part of the Commonwealth Caribbean. It is part of the mainland Caribbean region maintaining strong cultural, historical, and political ties with other Caribbean countries as well as serving as the headquarters for the Caribbean Community (CARICOM). In 2008, the country joined the Union of South American Nations as a founding member.

It has a wide variety of natural habitats and very high biodiversity. The country also hosts a part of the Amazon rainforest, the largest and most biodiverse tropical rainforest in the world. The region known as "the Guianas" consists of the large shield landmass north of the Amazon River and east of the Orinoco River known as the "land of many waters". Nine Indigenous tribes reside in Guyana: the Wai Wai, Macushi, Patamona, Lokono, Kalina, Wapishana, Pemon, Akawaio and Warao. Historically dominated by the Lokono and Kalina tribes, Guyana was colonised by the Dutch before coming under British control in the late 18th century. It was governed as British Guiana with a mostly plantation-style economy until the 1950s, forming part of the British West Indies. It gained independence in 1966 and officially became a republic within the Commonwealth of Nations in 1970. The legacy of British colonialism is reflected in the country's political administration, lingua franca and diverse population, which includes Indian, African, Amerindian, Chinese, Portuguese, other European, and various multiracial groups.

In 2017, 41% of the population of Guyana lived below the poverty line. Guyana's economy has been undergoing a transformation since the discovery of crude oil in 2015 and commercial drilling in 2019, with its economy growing by 49% in 2020, making it, by some accounts, the world's fastest-growing economy. In 2025, Guyana was the world's largest per capita oil producer. Since 2017, over 11 billion barrels of oil reserves have been found off the country's coast—the largest addition to global oil reserves since the 1970s. The crude oil production has made Guyana a major participant in international energy trade in early 2020s. Guyana is now ranked as having the fourth-highest GDP per capita in the Americas after the United States, Canada, and the Bahamas. According to the World Bank in 2023, abject poverty still exists and the country faces significant risks in structurally managing its growth.

== Etymology ==
The name "Guyana" is derived from the Guianas, an earlier name for a larger region that included the areas now called Guyana (British Guiana), Suriname (Dutch Guiana), French Guiana, the Guayana Region in Venezuela (Spanish Guiana), and Amapá in Brazil (Portuguese Guiana). According to the Oxford English Dictionary, the name "Guyana" comes from an Indigenous Amerindian language and means "land of many waters".

== History ==
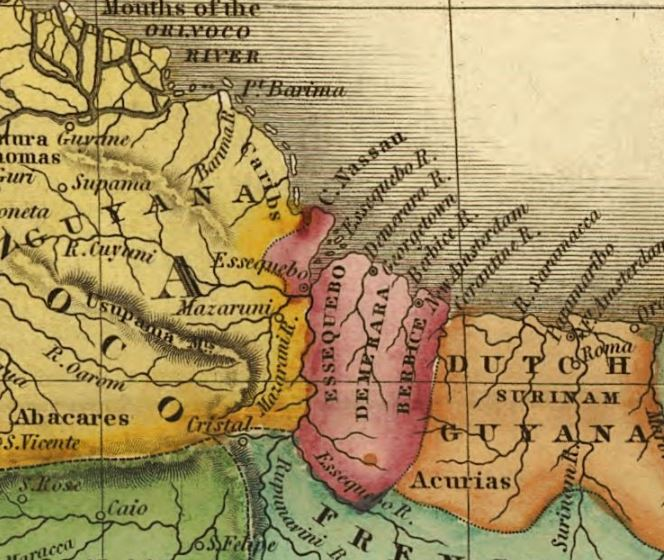
A map of Dutch and British Guiana in 1826

=== Before colonisation ===
What is now Guyana has been inhabited for millennia. Nine Indigenous tribes reside in Guyana: the Wai Wai, Macushi, Patamona, Lokono, Kalina, Wapishana, Pemon, Akawaio, and Warao. Many of these peoples practised shifting agriculture alongside hunting. Historians speculate that the Lokono and Kalina originated in the South American hinterland and migrated northward, first to the present-day Guianas and then to the Caribbean islands. The Lokono, mainly cultivators, hunters, and fishermen, migrated to the Caribbean islands before the Kalina and settled throughout the region.

=== Colonial period ===
Although Christopher Columbus was the first European to sight Guyana during his third voyage (in 1498), and Sir Walter Raleigh wrote an account in 1596, the Dutch were the first Europeans to establish colonies: Pomeroon (1581), Essequibo (1616), Berbice (1627), and Demerara (1752). After France invaded the Dutch Republic (1795), the British assumed control in 1796, with the Dutch and British signing the Anglo-Dutch Treaty of 1814 in London that ceded Demerara-Essequibo and Berbice to Britain.

In 1831, the united colonies of Demerara-Essequibo and separate colony of Berbice together became a single British colony known as British Guiana.

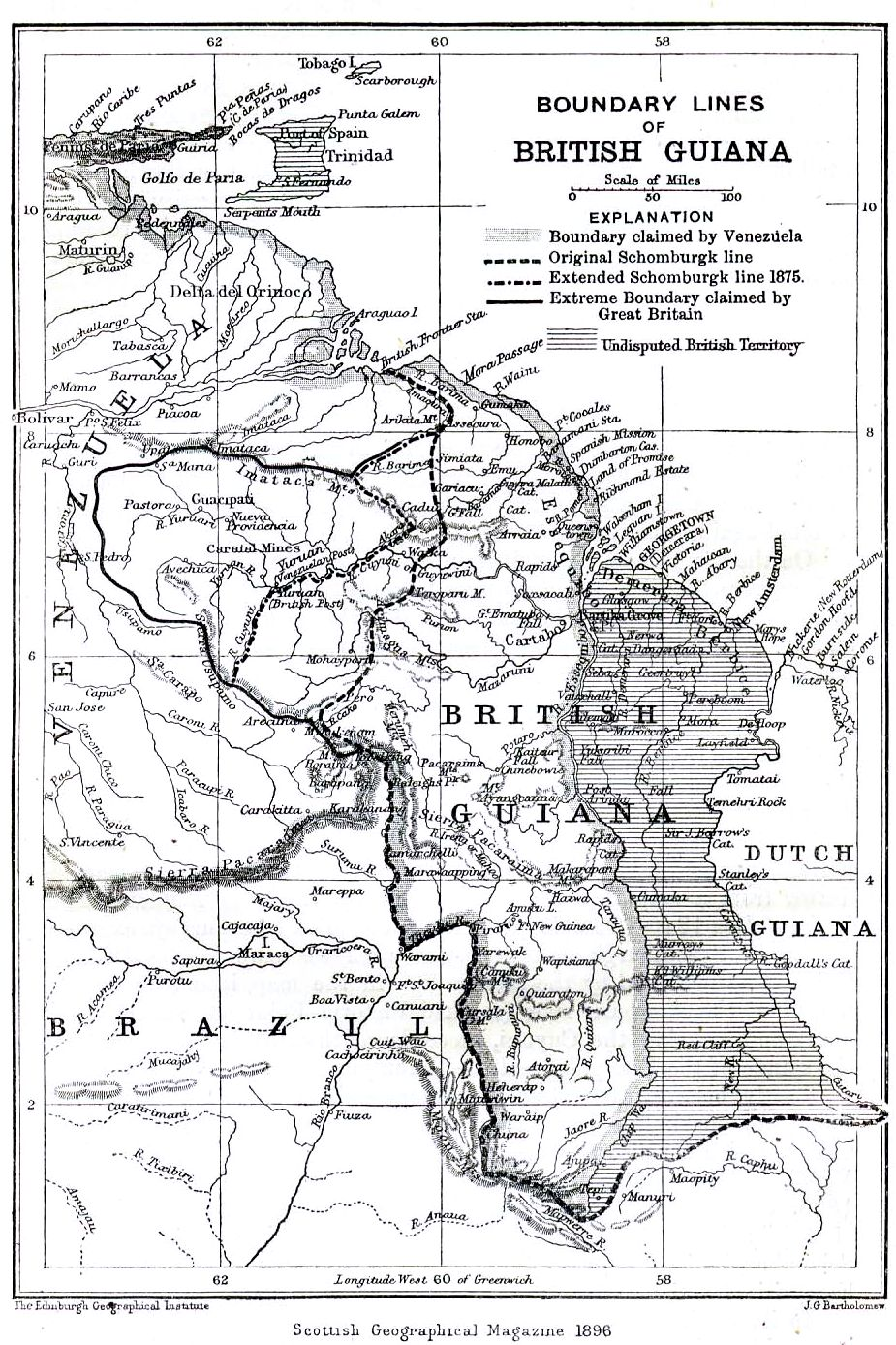
Map of British Guiana from 1896

Since its independence in 1824, Venezuela has claimed the area of land to the west of the Essequibo River. Simón Bolívar wrote to the British government warning against the Berbice and Demerara settlers settling on land which the Venezuelans, as assumed heirs of Spanish claims on the area dating to the 16th century, claimed was theirs. In 1899, an international tribunal ruled that the land belonged to Great Britain. From the Anglo-Dutch Treaty of 1814, the British inherited Dutch territory which included lands between the Orinoco and Courantyne rivers. Dutch sovereignty over these settlements was recognised in 1648 by Spain with the Peace of Münster, which stated under Article 5 that the Dutch would retain all of the "lordships, cities, castles, fortresses, trades and lands in the... West Indies" under their possession at the time. However, the treaty did not specify the boundary between Spanish Guiana and Dutch Guiana.

=== Independence ===
Guyana achieved independence from the United Kingdom as a dominion on 26 May 1966 and became a republic on 23 February 1970, remaining a member of the Commonwealth. Shortly after independence, Venezuela began to take diplomatic, economic, and military action against Guyana to enforce its territorial claim to the Essequibo region. Five months after Guyana's independence, in October 1966, Venezuelan troops crossed the international border and seized Ankoko Island which has been under occupation ever since. Venezuelan troops quickly made military installations and an airstrip.

Following independence, Forbes Burnham of the People's National Congress rose to power, quickly becoming a repressive authoritarian leader. Politics became divided on race with the Afro-Guyanese supporting Burnham's People's National Congress and the Indo-Guyanese supporting Cheddi Jagan's People's Progressive Party, in what became known as aapan jaat politics, loosely translated from Guyanese Hindustani as "for your own kind".

In 1978, a total of 918 people died at the Jonestown mass murder-suicide led by American cult leader Jim Jones at a remote settlement in northwest Guyana.

Former U.S. President Jimmy Carter visited Guyana to lobby for the resumption of free elections. On 5 October 1992, a new National Assembly and regional councils were elected in the first Guyanese election since 1964 to be internationally recognised as free and fair. Cheddi Jagan of the PPP was elected and sworn in as president on 9 October 1992. This reversed the monopoly that Afro-Guyanese traditionally had over Guyanese politics. The poll was marred by violence however.

In May 2008, President Bharrat Jagdeo was a signatory to the UNASUR Constitutive Treaty of the Union of South American Nations. The Guyanese government officially ratified the treaty in 2010.

In 2015, major oil reserves were discovered off the coast by ExxonMobil.

In March 2020, President David A. Granger narrowly lost the snap elections, following Granger's government loss of a vote of no confidence back in 2018. Granger refused to accept the results, but eventually five months later, Irfaan Ali of the People's Progressive Party/Civic was sworn in as the new president because of allegations of fraud and irregularities.

The National Trust of Guyana has designated nine historic sites as national monuments.

A referendum in neighbouring Venezuela was held in December 2023 on the annexation of the Essequibo region, which is disputed with Guyana and has been under Guyanese control since its founding. The vote passed with a 95% majority, but with a low turnout, with analysts stating Venezuelan President Nicolás Maduro's government had falsified the results. This came at the same time as a Venezuelan military buildup on the Guyanese border, sparking concerns of war between the two states.

In September 2025, Irfaan Ali was re-elected for a second term as Guyana’s president.

== Geography ==
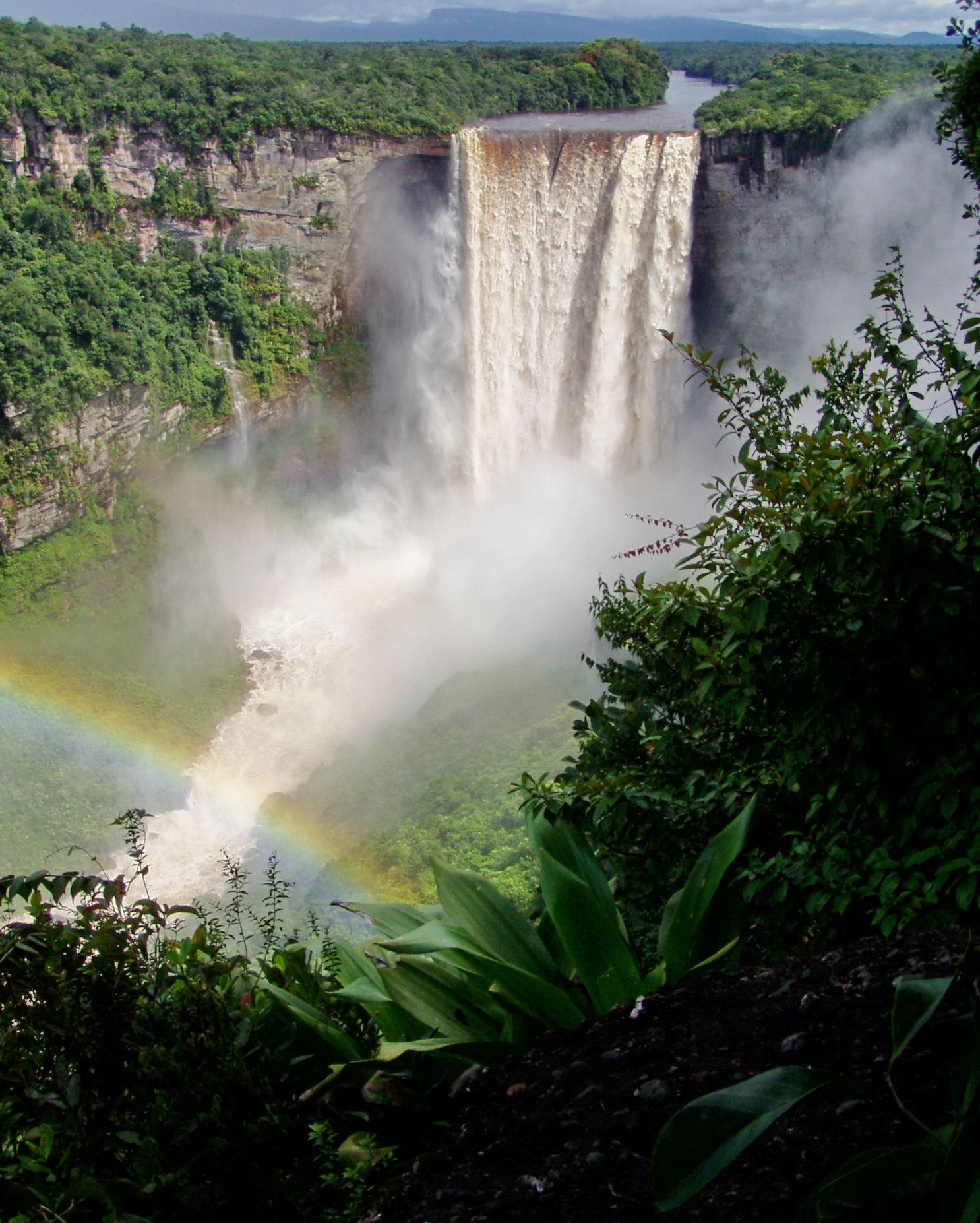
Kaieteur Falls is one of the world's most powerful waterfalls.

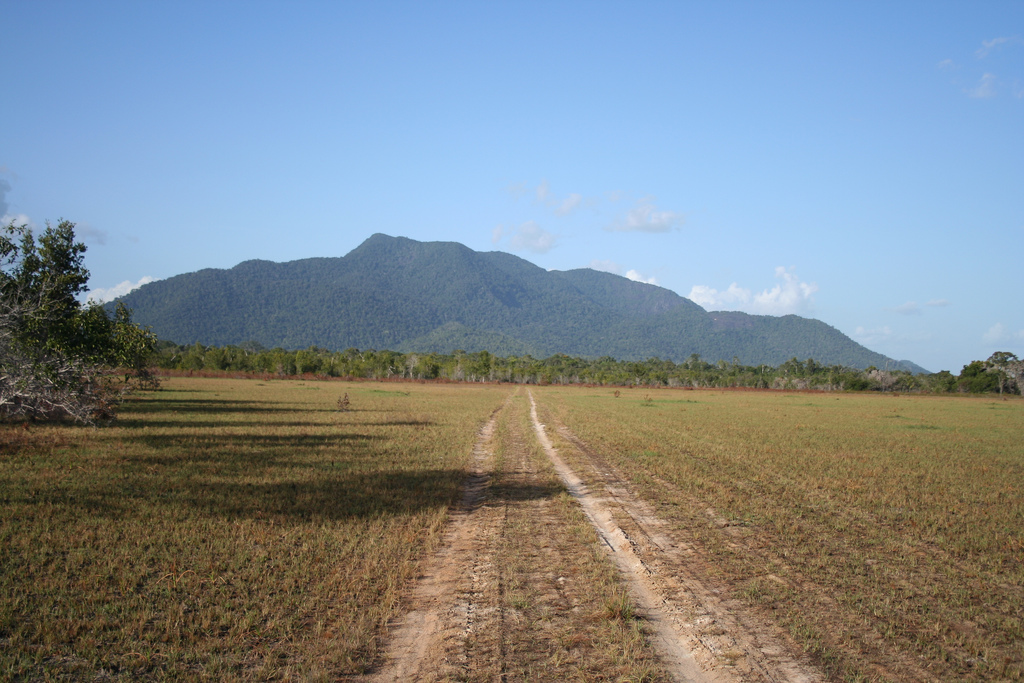
Rupununi Savannah

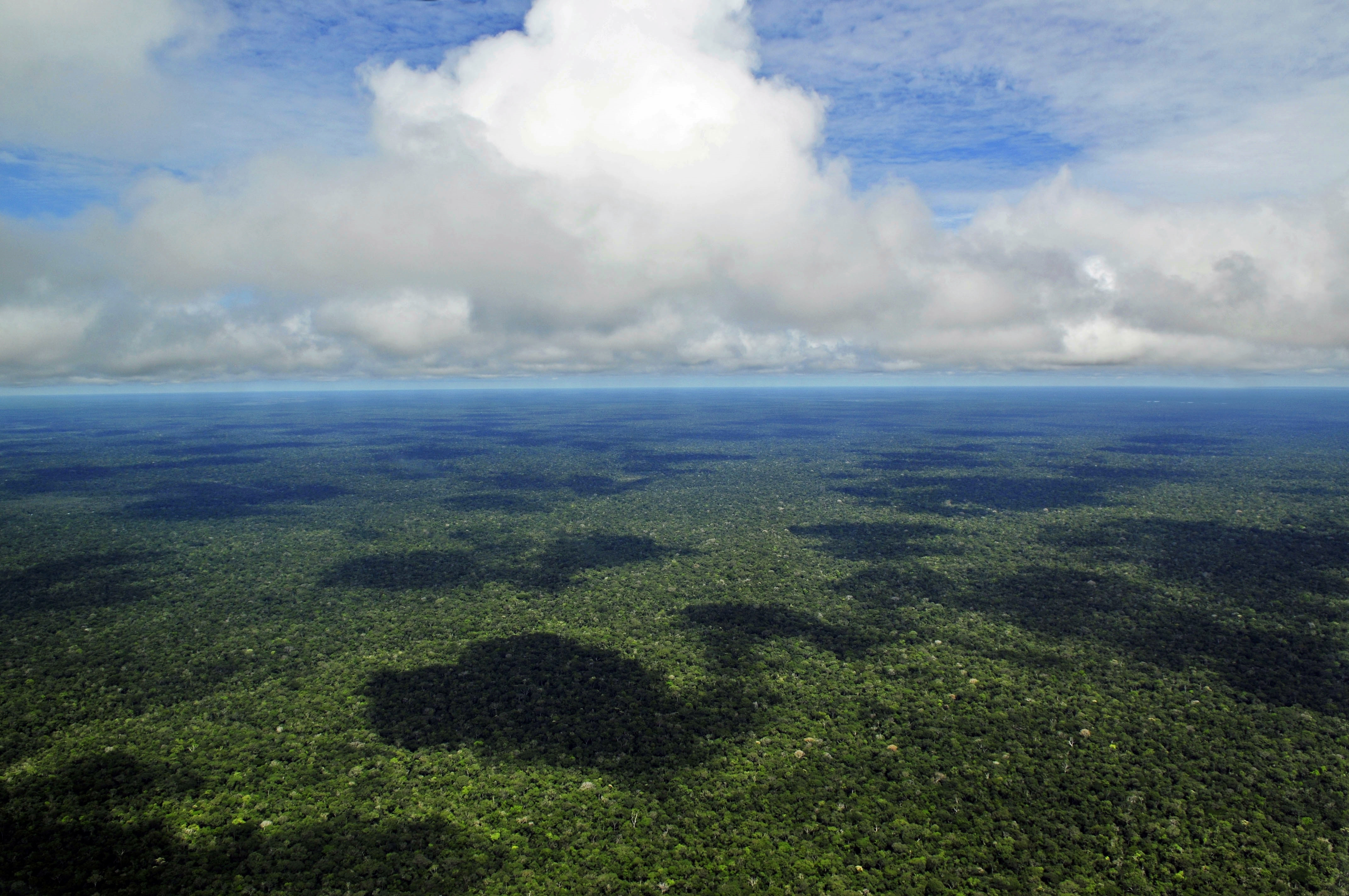
A large part of Guyana's territory is covered by the Amazon rainforest, the world's largest and most biodiverse tropical rainforest.

The territory controlled by Guyana lies between latitudes 1° and 9°N, and longitudes 56° and 62°W; it is one of the world's most sparsely populated countries.

The country can be divided into five natural regions: a narrow and fertile marshy plain along the Atlantic coast (low coastal plain) where most of the population lives; a white sand belt further inland (hilly sand and clay region), containing most of Guyana's mineral deposits; the dense rain forests (Forested Highland Region) in the southern part of the country; the drier savannah areas in the south-west; and the smallest interior lowlands (interior savannah) consisting mostly of mountains that gradually rise to the Brazilian border.

Some of Guyana's highest mountains are Mount Ayanganna (2,042 m or 6,699 ft), Monte Caburaí (1,465 m or 4,806 ft) and Mount Roraima (2,772 m or 9,094 ft – the highest mountain in Guyana) on the Brazil-Guyana-Venezuela tripoint border, part of the Pakaraima range. Mount Roraima and Guyana's table-top mountains (tepuis) are said to have been the inspiration for Sir Arthur Conan Doyle's 1912 novel The Lost World. There are also many volcanic escarpments and waterfalls, including Kaieteur Falls which is one of the world's most powerful waterfalls. North of the Rupununi River lies the Rupununi savannah, south of which lie the Kanuku Mountains.

The four longest rivers are the Essequibo at 1,010 km (628 mi) long, the Courentyne River at 724 km (450 mi), the Berbice at 595 km (370 mi), and the Demerara at 346 km (215 mi). The Courentyne river forms the border with Suriname. At the mouth of the Essequibo are several large islands, including the 145 km (90 mi) wide Shell Beach along the northwest coast, which is also a major breeding area for sea turtles (mainly leatherbacks) and other wildlife.

The climate is tropical and generally hot and humid, though moderated by northeast trade winds along the coast. There are two rainy seasons, the first from May to mid-August, the second from mid-November to mid-January.

Guyana has one of the largest unspoiled rainforests in South America, some parts of which are almost inaccessible to humans. The rich natural history of Guyana was described by early explorers Sir Walter Raleigh and Charles Waterton and later by naturalists Sir David Attenborough and Gerald Durrell. In 2008, the BBC broadcast a three-part programme called Lost Land of the Jaguar which highlighted the huge diversity of wildlife, including undiscovered species and rare species such as the giant otter and harpy eagle.

=== Biodiversity and conservation ===
Guyana is located on the Guiana Shield, an extremely biodiverse region; Guyana itself has one of the highest levels of biodiversity in the world. It is home to more than 225 species of mammals, 900 species of birds, 880 species of reptiles, and more than 6,500 species of plants. Among these, the most famous are the arapaima, which is the world's largest scaled freshwater fish; the giant anteater, the largest anteater; the giant otter, the world's largest and rarest river otter; and the Guianan cock-of-the-rock bird (Rupicola rupicola). The hoatzin (Opisthocomus hoazin), also known as the Canje pheasant, is the national bird of Guayana and is featured on the country's coat of arms. While superficially resembling a pheasant, the hoatzin is in fact the only remaining species in its taxonomic family.

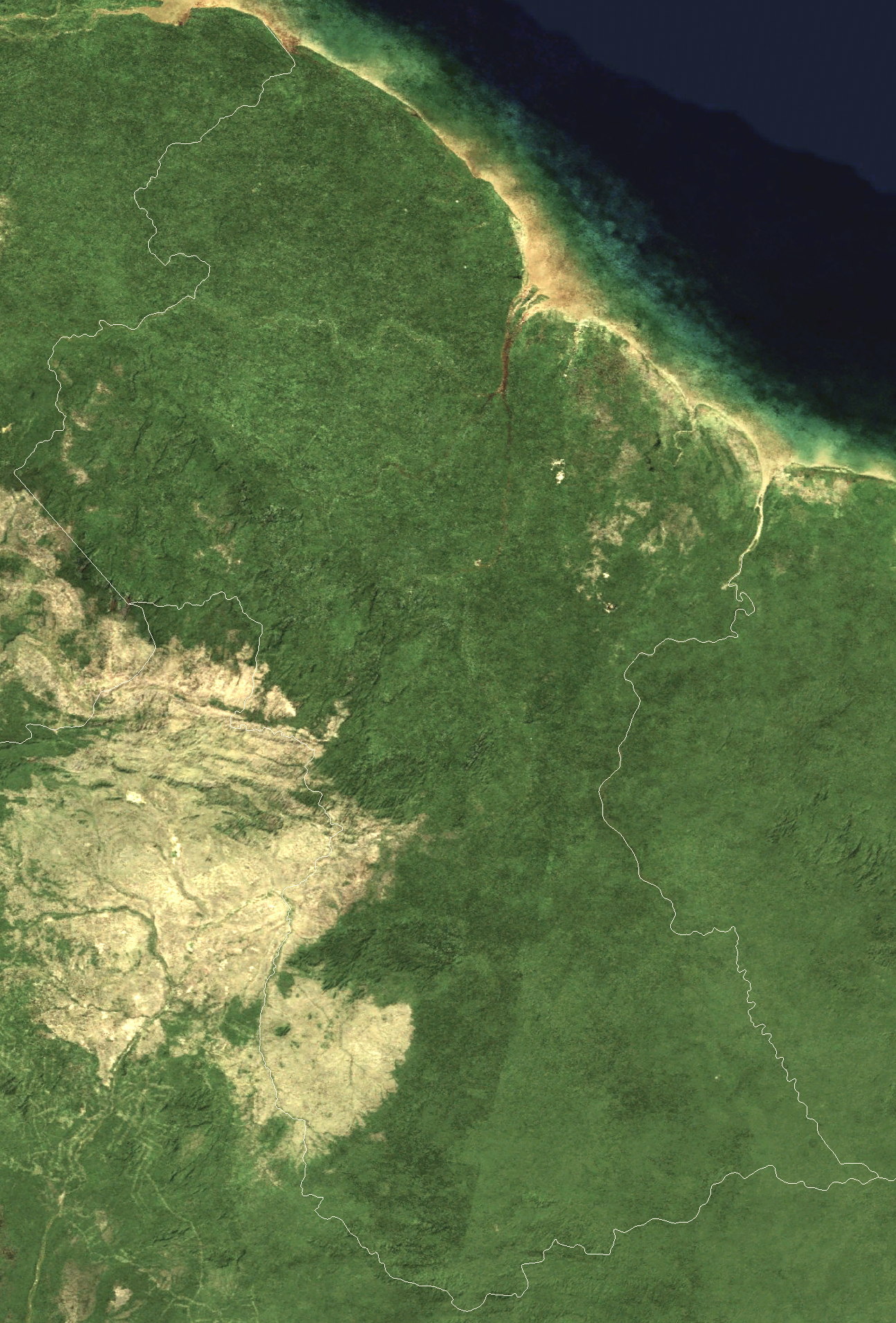
Satellite image of Guyana from 2004

The following habitats are present in Guyana: coastal, marine, littoral, estuarine, palustrine, mangrove, riverine, lacustrine, swamp, savanna, white sand forest, brown sand forest, montane, cloud forest, moist lowland, and dry evergreen scrub forests. In 1999, 14 areas were identified as potential hotspots for a National Protected Area System due to their biodiversity. The country is home to six ecoregions: Guayanan Highlands moist forests, Guianan moist forests, Orinoco Delta swamp forests, Tepuis, Guianan savanna, and Guianan mangroves. Unlike other areas of South America, over 70% of the natural habitat of the Guiana Shield region remains pristine.

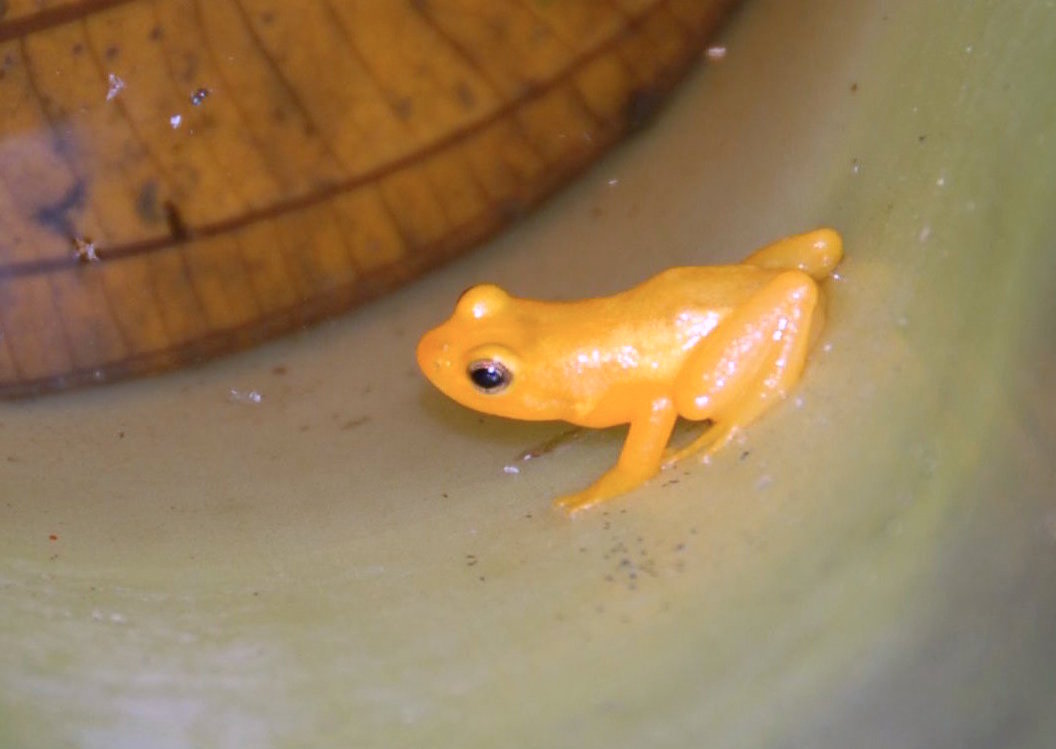
The Anomaloglossus beebei in Kaieteur National Park, endemic to Guyana

Southern Guyana is host to some of the most pristine expanses of evergreen forests in the northern part of South America. Most of the forests found are tall, evergreen hill-land and lower montane forests, with large expanses of flooded forest along major rivers. Thanks to the very low human population density of the area, most of these forests are still intact. More than 80% of Guyana is covered by forests; the country itself has over 1,000 species of trees and 8,000 species of plants, 4,000 of which are only found in Guyana.

The Smithsonian Institution has identified nearly 2,700 species of plants from this region, representing 239 families. The diversity of plants supports diverse animal life, recently documented by a biological survey organised by Conservation International. The reportedly clean, unpolluted waters of the Essequibo watershed support a diversity of fish and aquatic invertebrates, and are home to giant otters, capybaras, and several species of caimans.

On land, large mammals, such as jaguars, tapirs, bush dogs, giant anteaters, and saki monkeys are still common. Over 800 species of birds have been reported from the region, and the reptile and amphibian faunas are similarly rich.

In February 2004, the Government of Guyana issued a title to more than 4,000 km^{2} (1×10^{6} acres) of land in the Konashen Indigenous District as the Kanashen Community-Owned Conservation Area, managed by the Wai Wai, and the world's largest community-owned conservation area. The Iwokrama International Centre for Rain Forest Conservation and Development was also created for the protection and sustainable use of the Iwokrama forest area. Since 2009, Guyana and Norway have collaborated to promote green development in Guyana and aim to reduce deforestation. However the rate of net forest area loss more than doubled, from 3 790 ha per year in 1990–2000 to 8 420 ha per year in 2015–2025.

Conservation International has worked in Guyana since 1989 through its country programme Conservation International Guyana (CI-Guyana), with offices in Georgetown and Lethem. Its work in the country has included support for protected-area planning, forest monitoring linked to Guyana’s REDD+ programme, mercury-reduction projects in gold mining, and mangrove mapping.

== Government and politics ==
=== Politics ===
Irfaan Ali
President

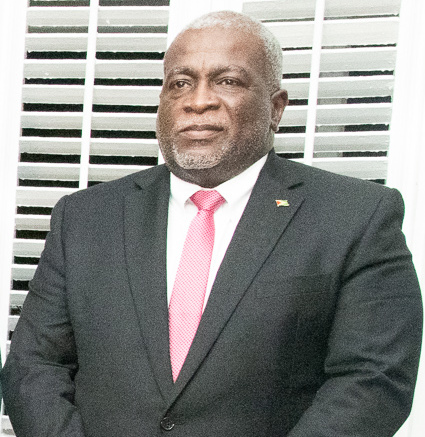
Mark Phillips
Prime Minister

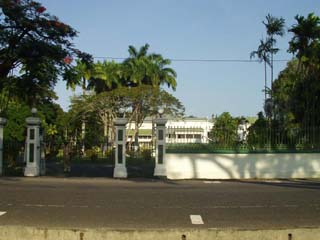
The State House, Guyana's presidential residence

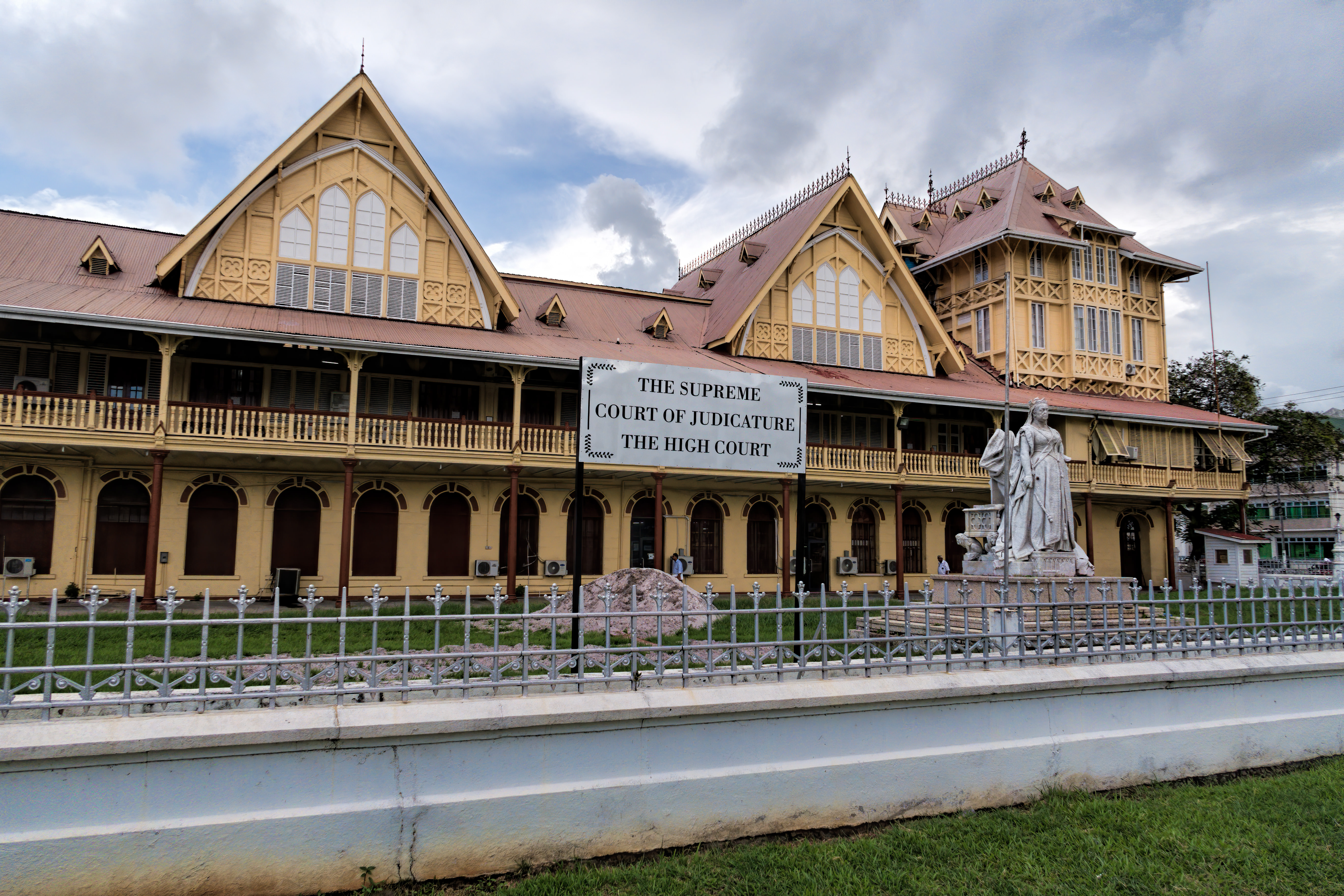
The Supreme Court of Guyana

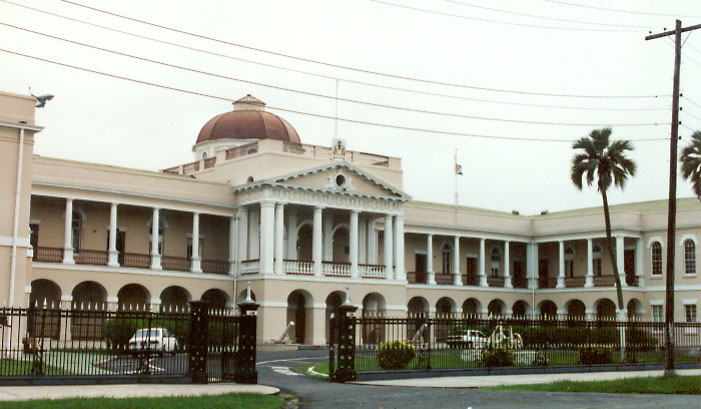
Guyana's parliament building since 1834

The politics of Guyana takes place in a framework of a parliamentary representative democratic republic, in which the president of Guyana is both head of state and head of government in a multi-party system. Executive power is exercised by the president and the government. Legislative power is vested in both the president and the National Assembly of Guyana. Historically, politics is a source of tension in the country, and violent riots have often broken out during elections.

During the 1970s and 1980s, the political landscape was dominated by the People's National Congress. In 1992, the first constitutional elections were overseen by former United States president Jimmy Carter, and the People's Progressive Party led the country until 2015. The two parties are principally organised along ethnic lines, and as a result, they often clash on issues related to the allocation of resources. In the general election held on 28 November 2011, the People's Progressive Party (PPP) retained a majority, and their presidential candidate Donald Ramotar was elected as president.

On 11 May 2015, early general elections were held. A coalition of the Partnership for National Unity and Alliance for Change (APNU-AFC) parties won 33 of the 65 seats in the National Assembly. On 16 May 2015, retired army general David A. Granger became the eighth president of Guyana. However, on 21 December 2018, a vote of confidence was called for, regarding terms under which the government granted a franchise for offshore oil exploration. Legislator Charrandass Persaud defected from the coalition, and the vote failed, requiring new elections. The governing coalition litigated this result for the entire 90 days allowed for new elections. New elections were held on 2 March 2020, and results were declared on 3 August 2020, with the People's Progressive Party/Civic as the winner. Mohamed Irfaan Ali became the ninth president of Guyana.

=== Public procurement ===
Public procurement in Guyana is overseen by the Public Procurement Commission, appointed under the Public Procurement Commission Act 2003. Due to lengthy delay in identifying and agreeing commission members, the commission was not appointed until 2016.

=== Administrative divisions ===
==== Regions and Neighbourhood Councils ====
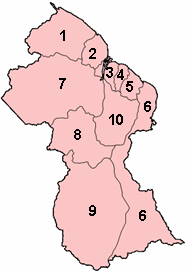
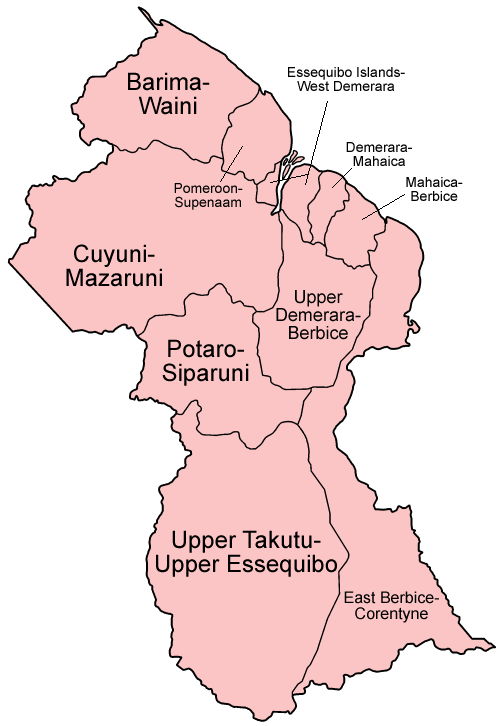
Regions of Guyana by number and name

Guyana is divided into 10 regions:

No	Region	Regional capital	Area km^{2}	Pop. (2022 census)	Pop. density per km^{2}
1	Barima-Waini	Mabaruma	20,339	38,956	1.92
2	Pomeroon-Supenaam	Anna Regina	6,195	56,469	9.12
3	Essequibo Islands-West Demerara	Vreed en Hoop	3,755	143,884	38.32
4	Demerara-Mahaica	Triumph	2,232	347,759	155.80
5	Mahaica-Berbice	Fort Wellington	4,190	57,667	13.76
6	East Berbice-Corentyne	New Amsterdam	36,234	114,574	3.16
7	Cuyuni-Mazaruni	Bartica	47,213	30,324	0.64
8	Potaro-Siparuni	Mahdia	20,051	13,598	0.68
9	Upper Takutu-Upper Essequibo	Lethem	57,750	29,944	0.52
10	Upper Demerara-Berbice	Linden	17,040	45,499	2.67
	Total		214,999	878,674	4.45

The regions are divided into 27 neighbourhood councils.

==== Natural regions ====
Guyana is divided into four natural regions. These are:

1. Low coastal plain
2. Hilly sand and clay
3. Highland region
4. Interior savannahs

=== Essequibo conflict ===
There is a conflict between Guyana and Venezuela concerning the Essequibo region: the Guyana–Venezuela territorial dispute. After years of fruitless mediation, Guyana went to the International Court of Justice in 2018, asking judges to rule that the 1899 border decision by an international panel of arbiters is valid and binding. Venezuela argues that a 1966 agreement to resolve the dispute effectively nullified the original arbitration. The ICJ has ruled that the case is admissible and has jurisdiction, but it is expected to take years to reach a final decision. On Sunday, 3 December 2023, Venezuela's president, Nicolas Maduro, convoked a referendum to ask Venezuelan electors five questions, including whether to create a Venezuelan state in Essequibo and whether voters support granting Venezuelan citizenship to the region's current and future residents. Venezuela does not recognise the United Nations panel's jurisdiction over the decades-old dispute, but Vice President Delcy Rodríguez nonetheless characterised the ruling as a "victory for Venezuela," given that the UN did not halt the referendum plans.

=== Foreign relations ===
==== Boundary disputes ====
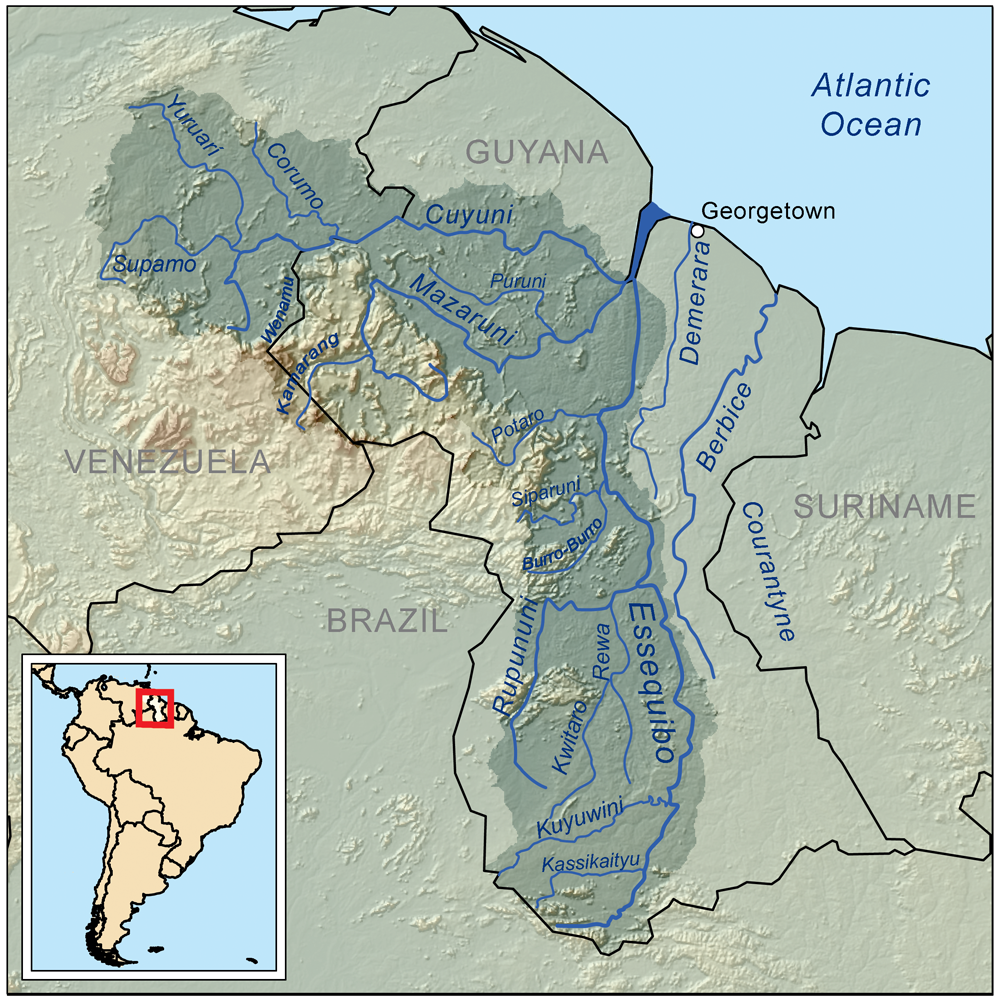
Map of Guyana with the disputed territories incorporated, showing the Essequibo River and (shaded dark) the river's drainage basin. Venezuela claims territory up to the western bank of the river. The historical claim by the UK included the river basin well into current-day Venezuela.

Guyana is in border disputes with both Suriname, which claims the area east of the left bank of the Corentyne River and the New River in southwestern Suriname, and Venezuela which claims the land west of the Essequibo River, once the Dutch colony of Essequibo as part of what they call "Guayana Essequiba". The maritime component of the territorial dispute with Suriname was arbitrated by the United Nations Convention on Law of the Sea, and a ruling was announced on 21 September 2007. The ruling concerning the Caribbean Sea north of both nations found both parties violated treaty obligations and declined to order any compensation to either party.

When the British surveyed British Guiana in 1840, they included the entire Cuyuni River basin within the colony, to the protest of Venezuela which claimed all lands west of the Essequibo River. In 1897 in Washington, DC, both countries accepted the "Treaty between Great Britain and the United States of Venezuela Respecting the Settlement of the Boundary between the Colony of British Guiana and the United States of Venezuela." According to the Treaty of Washington (1897), the final decision by the arbitration tribunal in Paris would be a "full, perfect, and final settlement" to the border dispute. In 1899, the tribunal issued the Paris Arbitral Award, granting a majority of the disputed territory to British Guiana. Following the settlement, an exact border was demarcated by markers and coordinates by a Venezuelan and British boundary commission in accordance with International law. Venezuela brought up again the settled claim, during the 1960s cold war period, and during Guyana's Independence period. In 1962, Venezuelan President Rómulo Betancourt resuscitated Venezuela's claim to the disputed territory by declaring the 1899 arbitration award null and void. The result of this complaint led to the Treaty of Geneva of 1966, which was signed by the Governments of Guyana, the United Kingdom and Venezuela. Venezuela calls this region "Zona en Reclamación" (Reclamation Zone) and Venezuelan maps of the national territory routinely include it, drawing it in with dashed lines.

In 2023, a referendum was held in Venezuela which saw 95% of voters approve creating a new state in the disputed area with Guyana's President Irfaan Ali calling it a direct threat on the nation's sovereignty. Venezuelan President Nicolás Maduro claims wide support for the move, despite only around 10% of the Venezuelan voting population taking part in the referendum. Both the US and Brazil made signs of supporting Guyana in the territorial dispute, with Brazil sending troops to their border with the Essequibo region. US Southern Command held air exercises with Guyana Defence Forces in Guyana in December 2023.

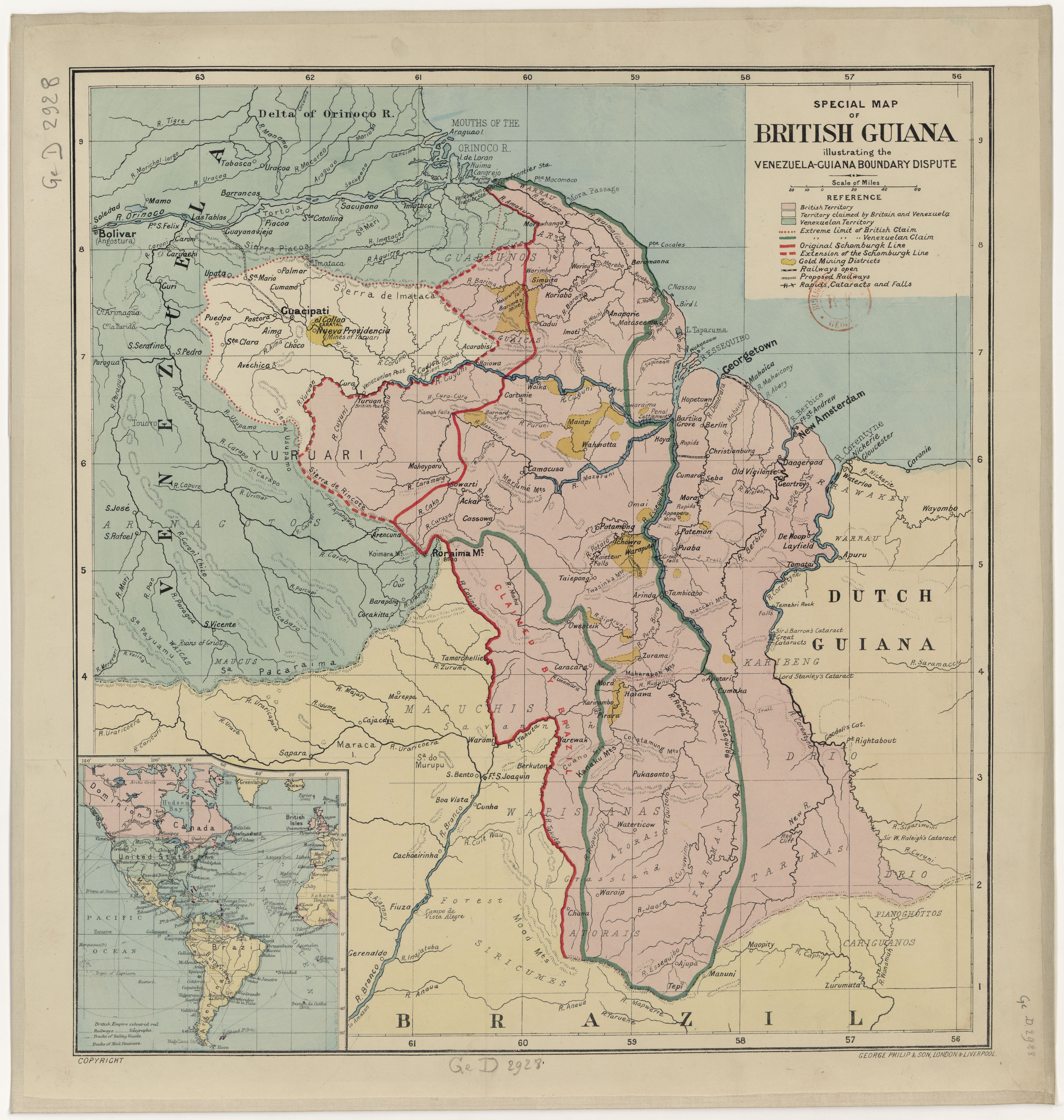
Illustration of the Guiana-Venezuela border dispute, including western boundary ceded to Venezuela, published by Scottish cartographer George Philip in 1897

Specific small disputed areas involving Guyana are Ankoko Island with Venezuela; Corentyne River with Suriname; and Tigri Area or New River Triangle with Suriname. In 1967 a Surinamese survey team was found in the Tigri Area and was forcibly removed. In August 1969 a patrol of the Guyana Defence Force found a survey camp and a partially completed airstrip inside the triangle, and documented evidence of the Surinamese intention to occupy the entire disputed area. After an exchange of gunfire, the Surinamese were driven from the triangle.

==== Organisation of American States (OAS) ====
Guyana entered the Organisation of American States in 1991.

==== Indigenous Leaders Summits of America (ILSA) ====
With Guyana having many groups of Indigenous persons and given the geographical location of the country, the contributions of the Guyanese to the OAS respecting Indigenous people may be significant.

The position of the OAS respecting Indigenous persons developed over the years. "The "OAS has supported and participated in the organisation of Indigenous Leaders Summits of Americas (ILSA)"

The Draft American Declaration of the Rights of the Indigenous Persons appears to be a working document

==== Agreements which affect financial relationships ====
===== The Double Taxation Relief (CARICOM) Treaty 1994 =====
At a CARICOM Meeting, representatives of Trinidad and Tobago and Guyana respectively signed The Double Taxation Relief (CARICOM) Treaty 1994 on 19 August 1994.

This treaty covered taxes, residence, tax jurisdictions, capital gains, business profits, interest, dividends, royalties and other areas.

===== FATCA =====
On 30 June 2014, Guyana signed a Model 1 agreement with the United States of America in relation to the Foreign Account Tax Compliance Act (FATCA). This Model 1 agreement includes a reference to the Tax Information Exchange Agreement (Clause 3) which was signed on 22 July 1992 in Georgetown, Guyana intending to exchange tax information on an automatic basis.

=== Military ===
The Guyana Defence Force (GDF) is the military service of Guyana. It maintains strong military relations with Brazil, with which it collaborates on border security through yearly regional military exchange gatherings. Guyana also has an ongoing partnership with the United States Army to enhance the country's military readiness and capabilities to respond to security threats.

=== LGBT rights ===
Homosexuality, as well as anal and oral sex, is illegal in Guyana. It is currently the only country in South America that prohibits same-sex activity. Engaging in such acts can warrant life imprisonment, though the prohibition is unenforced. These laws can be difficult to alter, as the Constitution of Guyana protects laws inherited from the British Empire from constitutional review. However, cross-dressing has been legal since 2018, when a ban was struck down by Guyana's court of last resort, the Caribbean Court of Justice. President David A. Granger (2015–2020) expressed support for these efforts.

== Economy ==
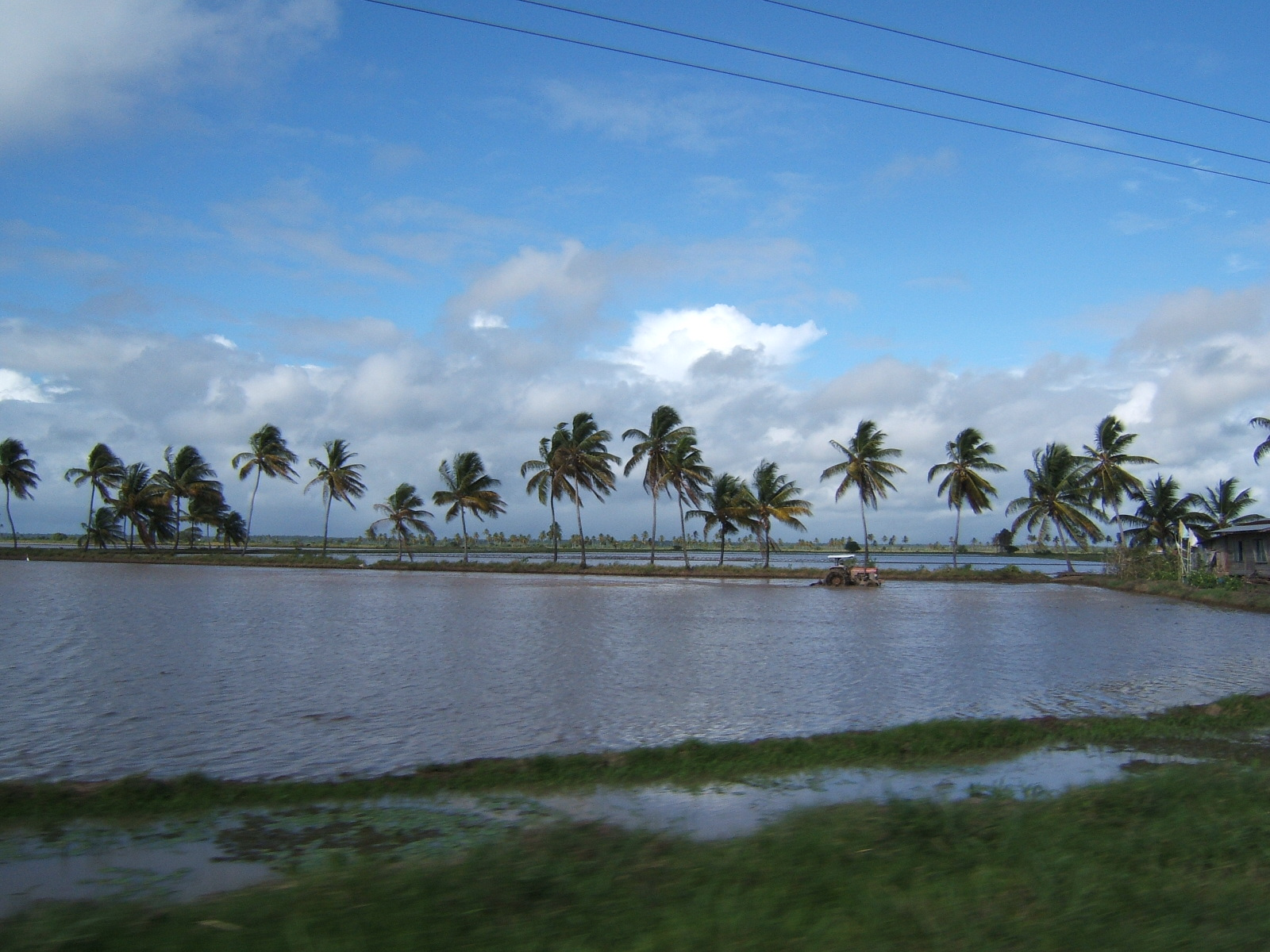
A tractor in a rice field on Guyana's coastal plain

The main economic activities in Guyana are agriculture (rice and Demerara sugar), bauxite and gold mining, timber, seafood, minerals, crude oil and natural gas. Guyana's gold production in 2015 is 14 tonnes (14 long tons; 15 short tons).

Offshore oil production, which began in 2019, has transformed Guyana's economy. According to World Bank estimates, real GDP grew by 43.8% in 2024 and 15.4% in 2025. Oil production reached 261.1 million barrels in 2025, while the non-oil economy grew by 14.3%, supported by agriculture, manufacturing, construction and public investment. The country's Natural Resource Fund held US$3.25 billion at the end of 2025. The World Bank identifies overheating, falling oil prices and reduced competitiveness in non-oil sectors among the principal economic risks.

Preservation of Guyana's pristine forests has been a key component for receiving international aid through REDD programme

=== Economic history ===
The earliest residents of Guyana employed a variety of agricultural practices for subsistence living but also had extensive networks of trade, dealing in items such as blow pipes, curare, cassava graters, and other essentials. These trade networks were important even at the time of the earliest European contact, and Dutch traders were inclined to gift the local peoples in order to maintain successful settlements.

After the initial rush to find gold in the New World waned, the Dutch found the climate to be suitable for growing sugar cane, converting large tracts of the Guyanese coast into plantations and supplying with labour from the Atlantic slave trade. The country and economy were run by a small European planter elite which continued on when the colonies of the territory were merged and the land was given over to the British Empire in 1814. Upon emancipation in 1838, almost all of the former slaves abandoned the plantations, and Indians were brought to the country under indenture contracts from 1838 until the end of the system in 1917.

The production of balatá (natural latex) was once a big business in Guyana. Most of the balatá bleeding in Guyana took place in the foothills of the Kanuku Mountains in the Rupununi savannah. Early exploitation also took place in the North West District, but most of the trees in the area were destroyed by illicit bleeding methods that involved cutting down the trees rather than making incisions in them. Uses of balatá included the making of cricket balls, temporary dental fillings, and the crafting of figurines and other decorative items (particularly by the Macushi people).

When the country gained independence from British rule, a policy of nationalisation was enacted by Forbes Burnham to address the inequities that were established by plantation-based colonial rule. All large-scale industries such as foreign-owned bauxite mining (Reynolds Metals and Rio Tinto's Alcan) and sugar (GuySuCo) operations were taken over by the government. However, the economy under nationalisation was plagued by problems; political instability leading to an exodus of skilled labour, inexperienced management, aging infrastructure. Poor international market conditions also expanded the country's debt.

The Guyanese economy rebounded slightly and exhibited moderate economic growth after 1999, due to expansion in the agricultural and mining sectors, a more favourable atmosphere for business initiatives, a more realistic exchange rate, fairly low inflation, and the continued support of international organisations. Guyana held huge amounts of debt which have been written off through various international agencies. In 2003 Guyana qualified for US$329 million of debt relief, in addition to the US$256 million from the original World Bank plan for assisting heavily indebted poor countries in 1999. The Multilateral Debt Relief Initiative in 2006/7 wrote off about US$611 million of Guyana's debt by the International Monetary Fund, the World Bank and the Inter-American Development Bank. In 2006, Japan finalised its bilateral debt cancellation agreement, in 2007, US$15 million was written off by China and in 2008, Venezuela cancelled US$12.5 million.

In 2008, the economy witnessed a 3% increase in growth amid the 2008 financial crisis; it grew 5.4% in 2011 and 3.7% in 2012. IMF projected economic growth to be 53% in 2020 following the completion of the first off-shore oil project. Actual growth in GDP in 2020 was 43%; reports in April 2021 anticipate 20% growth for 2021.

=== Tax policy ===
The government initiated a major overhaul of the tax code in early 2007. A Value Added Tax (VAT) replaced six different taxes. Prior to the implementation of the VAT, it had been relatively easy to evade sales tax, and many businesses were in violation of tax code. Many businesses opposed VAT introduction because of the extra paperwork required; however, the Government has remained firm on the VAT. Replacing several taxes with one flat tax rate, it will also be easier for government auditors to spot tax evasion.

=== Transport ===
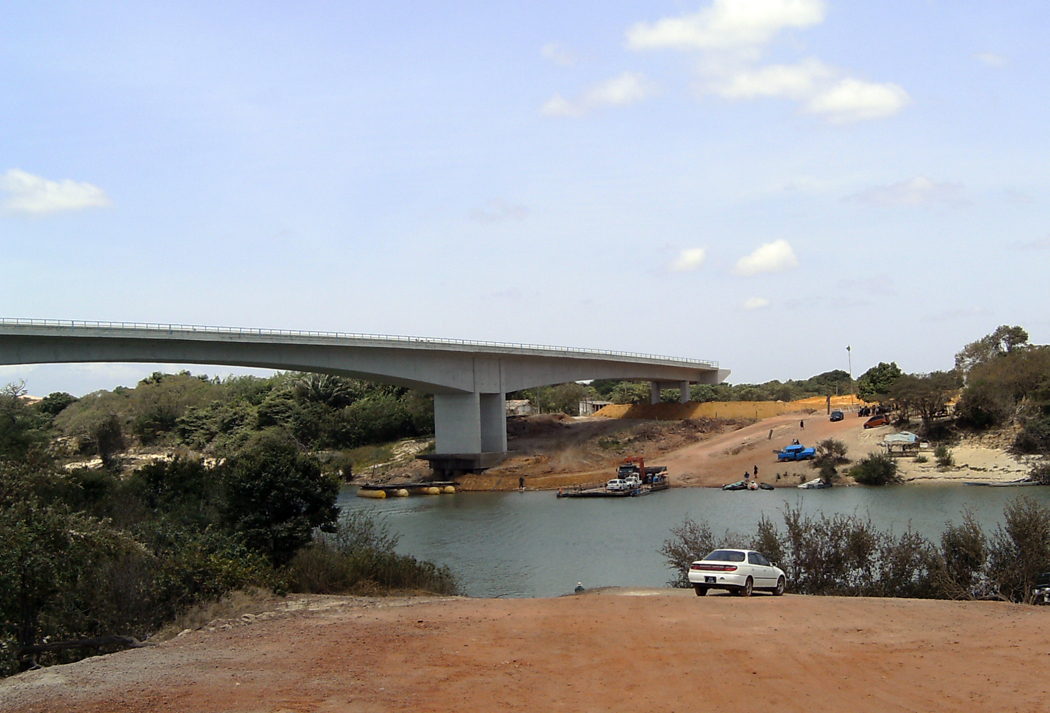
Cross-border bridge from Guyana to Brazil near Lethem

There are a total of 187 km (116 mi) of railway, all dedicated to ore transport. There are 7,969 km (4,952 mi) of highway, of which 591 km (367 mi) are paved. Navigable waterways extend 1,077 km (669 mi), including the Berbice, Demerara, and Essequibo rivers.

There are ports at Georgetown, Port Kaituma, and New Amsterdam. There are two international airports (Cheddi Jagan International Airport, Timehri and Eugene F. Correia International Airport (formerly Ogle Airport); along with about 90 airstrips, nine of which have paved runways. Guyana, Suriname and the Falkland Islands are the only three regions in South America that drive on the left.

=== Electricity ===
The electricity sector in Guyana is dominated by Guyana Power and Light (GPL), the state-owned vertically integrated utility. Although the country has a large potential for hydroelectric and bagasse-fuelled power generation, most of its 226 MW of installed capacity correspond to diesel-engine driven generators.

Several initiatives are in place to improve energy access in the hinterland.

== Demographics ==
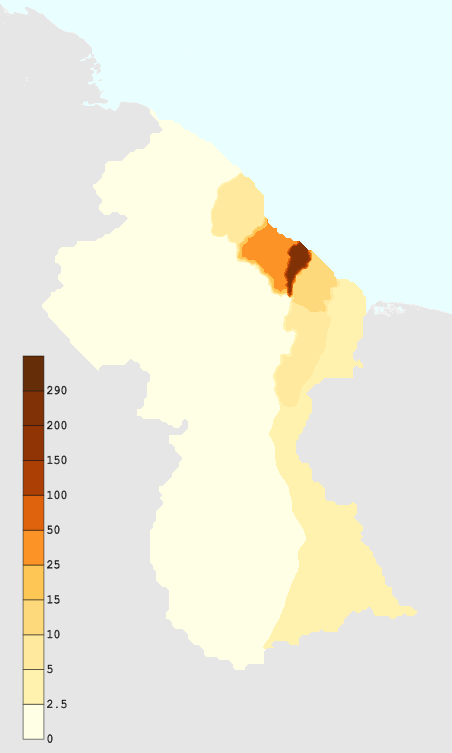
Guyana's population density in 2005 (people per km^{2})

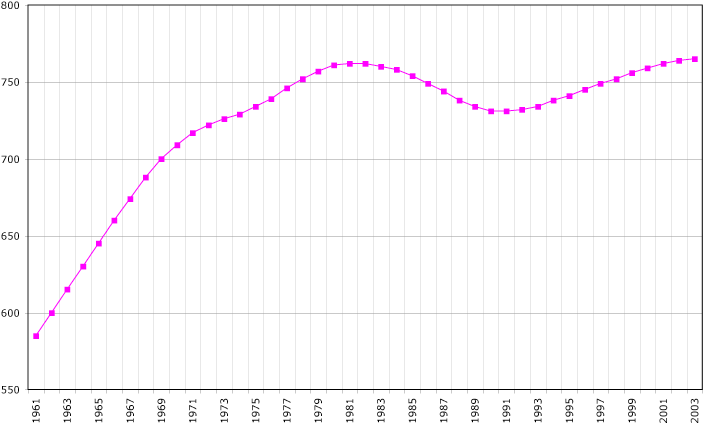
A graph showing the population of Guyana from 1961 to 2003. The population decline in the 1980s can be clearly seen.

The large majority (about 90%) of Guyana's 744,000 people live along a narrow coastal strip that ranges from a width of 16 to 64 km (10 to 40 mi) inland and makes up approximately 10% of the nation's total land area.

Guyana's population is racially and ethnically heterogeneous, with ethnic groups originating from India, Africa, Europe, and China, as well as Indigenous peoples. Despite their diverse ethnic backgrounds, most groups share a common language of English and its Guyanese English Creole vernacular.

The largest ethnic group is the Indo-Guyanese (also known as East Indians), the descendants of indentured labourers from India who make up 43.5% of the population, according to the 2002 census. They are followed by the Afro-Guyanese, the descendants of enslaved people brought from Africa, primarily West Africa, who constitute 30.2%. The Guyanese of mixed heritage make up 16.7%.

The Indigenous peoples, known locally as Amerindians, make up 10.5% of the population. The nine Indigenous nations in Guyana, defined by language, are the Akawaio, Lokono, Arekuna (Pemon), Carib (Karinya), Makushi, Patamona, Wai Wai, Wapichan, and Warao. They are the third-largest demographic group in the country and are the majority population in the southern interior.

The Afro-Guyanese population mainly descends from West African ethnicities such as the Ashanti from Ghana, the Yoruba from Southwest Nigeria, the Igbo from South-Eastern Nigeria, the Bakongo of West-Central Africa, and the Mandingo from Senegal. Most Indo-Guyanese are descended from indentured labourers who migrated from North India, especially the Bhojpur and Awadh regions of the Hindi Belt in the present-day states of Uttar Pradesh, Bihar, and Jharkhand. A significant minority of Indo-Guyanese are also descended from indentured migrants who came from the South Indian states of Tamil Nadu and Andhra Pradesh; these are the plurality ancestry in the East Berbice-Corentyne region. The two largest groups, the Indo-Guyanese and Afro-Guyanese, have experienced some racial tension.

=== Largest cities ===
Largest cities and towns of Guyana
Rank	Name	Region	Population
1	Georgetown	Demerara-Mahaica	118,363
2	Linden	Upper Demerara-Berbice	27,277
3	New Amsterdam	East Berbice-Corentyne	17,329
4	Corriverton	East Berbice-Corentyne	11,386
5	Bartica	Cuyuni-Mazaruni	8,004
6	Mahaica	Demerara-Mahaica	4,867
7	Rose Hall	East Berbice-Corentyne	4,413
8	Parika	Essequibo Islands-West Demerara	4,385
9	Triumph	Demerara-Mahaica	3,788
10	Uitvlugt	Essequibo Islands-West Demerara	2,980

=== Languages ===
English is the official language of Guyana and is used for education, government, media, and services. The vast majority of the population speaks Guyanese Creole, an English-based creole with slight African, Indian, and Amerindian influences, as their first language.

Indigenous Cariban languages (Akawaio, Wai-Wai, and Macushi) are spoken by a small minority of Amerindians.

Guyanese Hindustani is spoken by the older generation of the Indo-Guyanese community, but younger Guyanese use English or Guyanese Creole. Indo-Surinamese immigrants from Suriname speak the Sarnami variant, especially the Nickerian-Berbician Hindustani subdialect.

=== Religion ===
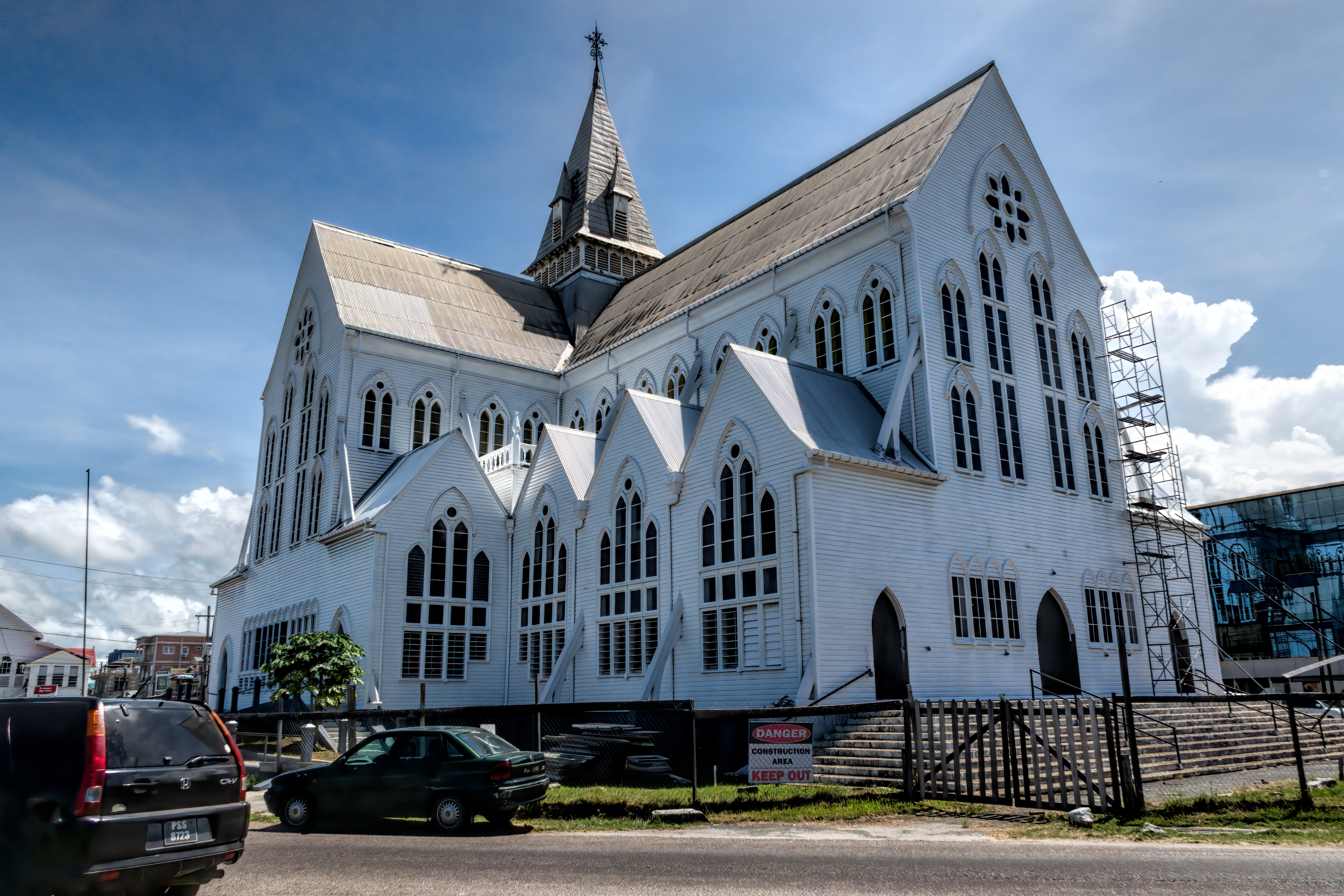
St. George's Anglican Cathedral in the capital Georgetown

In 2012 the population was 64% Christian, 25% Hindu, 7% Muslim, 3% irreligious and 1% of other faiths.

Religion is an important aspect of identity in Guyana and reflects the various external influences of colonialism and immigrant groups. Christianity was considered the prestigious religion, transmitting European culture and representing upward mobility in the colonial society. Missionaries and churches built schools, and until nationalisation in the 1970s, nearly all schools were denominational. When Indians were brought to the country as indentured labour, Hinduism and Islam gained prominence, but for some decades neither were acknowledged for legal marriage.

Some traditional African and Amerindian spiritual beliefs remain alongside the dominant religions.

=== Health ===
Life expectancy at birth is estimated to be 69.5 years as of 2020.

The PAHO/ WHO Global Health Report 2014 (using statistics of 2012) ranked the country as having the highest suicide rate in the world, with a mortality rate of 44.2 per 100,000 inhabitants. According to 2011 estimates from the WHO, HIV prevalence is 1.2% of the teen/adult population (ages 15–49).

=== Education ===
Education in Guyana was primarily introduced and operated by missionising Christian denominations. The wealthy planter elite often sent their children for education abroad in England, but as schools improved in Guyana, they also modelled after the former British education system. Primary education became compulsory in 1876, although the need for children to assist in agricultural labour kept many children from schooling. In the 1960s, the government took over control of all schools in the country. Fees were removed, new schools were opened in rural areas, and the University of Guyana was established so students no longer were required to go abroad for tertiary education. In addition to the University of Guyana, Texila American University—founded in 2010—offers medical and health sciences programmes and is accredited by CAAM-HP and ACCM.

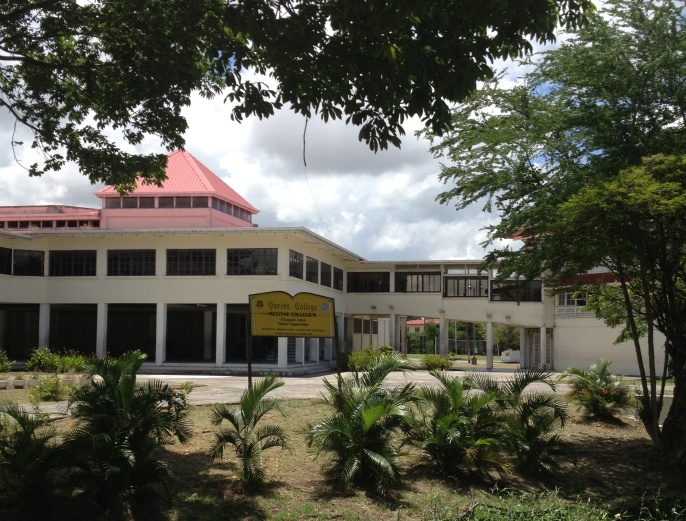
Queen's College, Georgetown

Guyana's literacy was one of the highest in the Caribbean, by estimated literacy rate of 96 per cent in 1990, however, the functional literacy may have been only as high as 70%. In a 2014 UNESCO estimate, literacy is 96.7 in the 15–24 year old age group.

Students are expected to take the NGSA (National Grade Six Assessment) for entrance into high school in grade 7. They take the CXC at the end of high school. Schools have introduced the CAPE exams which all other Caribbean countries have introduced. The A-level system, inherited from the British era, is offered only in a few schools.

Infrastructure challenges affect access to education, especially for students in the hinterland. A World Bank assessment showed roughly 50% of teachers were "untrained, operated with inadequate teaching materials, and served children of parents with low levels of adult literacy".

== Culture ==
Holidays
1 January	New Year's Day
Spring	Youman Nabi (Mawlid)
23 February	Republic Day / Mashramani
March	Phagwah (Holi)
March / April	Good Friday
March / April	Easter Sunday
March / April	Easter Monday
1 May	Labour Day
5 May	Arrival Day
26 May	Independence Day
First Monday in July	CARICOM Day
1 August	Emancipation Day
October / November	Diwali
25 December	Christmas
26 or 27 December	Boxing Day
Varies	Eid al-Fitr
Varies	Eid al-Adha

Guyana's culture is very similar to that of the English-speaking Caribbean, and has historically been tied to the English-speaking Caribbean as part of the British Empire when it became a possession in the nineteenth century.

The current Guyanese culture began to develop when immigrants (some enslaved, some coerced, others coming of their own accord) adapted and converged with the dominant British culture. Slavery eradicated much of the distinction between differing African cultures as they were supplanted by British culture, which encouraged the adoption of Christianity and the values of British colonists; this laid the foundations of today's Afro-Guyanese culture. Arriving later and under somewhat more favourable circumstances, Indian immigrants were subjected to less assimilation, and they preserved more aspects of Indian culture, such as religion, cuisine, music, festivals, and clothing.

Guyana's geographical location, its sparsely populated rain-forest regions, and its substantial Amerindian population differentiate it from English-speaking Caribbean countries. Its blend of the two dominant cultures, Indo-Guyanese and Afro-Guyanese, gives it similarities to Trinidad and Tobago and Suriname, and distinguishes it from other parts of the Americas. Guyana shares similar interests with the islands in the West Indies, such as food, festive events, music, sports, etc.

Events include Mashramani (Mash), Phagwah (Holi), and Deepavali (Diwali).

=== Traditional Foods of Guyana ===
Guyanese cuisine reflects the country’s diverse cultural heritage, featuring dishes such as pepperpot, a slow‑cooked meat stew flavoured with cassareep, cinnamon, and spices and traditionally served on special occasions, and cook‑up rice, a one‑pot meal of rice simmered with coconut milk, peas, beans, and assorted meats.

=== Landmarks ===
- St George's Anglican Cathedral: A historic Anglican Cathedral made of wood.
- Demerara Harbour Bridge: The world's fourth-longest floating bridge.
- Berbice Bridge: The world's sixth-longest floating bridge.
- Caribbean Community (CARICOM) Building: Houses the headquarters of the largest and most powerful economic union in the Caribbean.
- Providence Stadium: Situated on Providence on the east bank of the Demerara River and built in time for the ICC World Cup 2007, it is the largest sports stadium in the country. It is also near the Providence Mall, forming a major spot for leisure in Guyana.
- Arthur Chung Conference Centre: Presented as a gift from the People's Republic of China to the Government of Guyana. It is the only one of its kind in the country.
- Stabroek Market: A large cast-iron colonial structure that looked like a statue was located next to the Demerara River.
- Georgetown City Hall: A beautiful wooden structure also from the colonial era.
- Takutu River Bridge: A bridge across the Takutu River, connecting Lethem in Guyana to Bonfim in Brazil.
- Umana Yana: An Amerindian benab (thatched hut), that is a national monument built in 1972, for a meeting of the Foreign Ministers of the Non-Aligned nations (It was rebuilt in 2016).
- Shell Beach: Approximately 140 km long beach. In some parts beach consists of pure shells, very high biological diversity. Important nesting site for 8 species of sea turtles.
- Parliament Building of Guyana: Parliament Building currently houses the seat of the National Assembly of the Government of Guyana. Located in Stabroek, facing Brickdam and bordered by Hadfield Street, High Street, and Cornhill Street

=== Sports ===
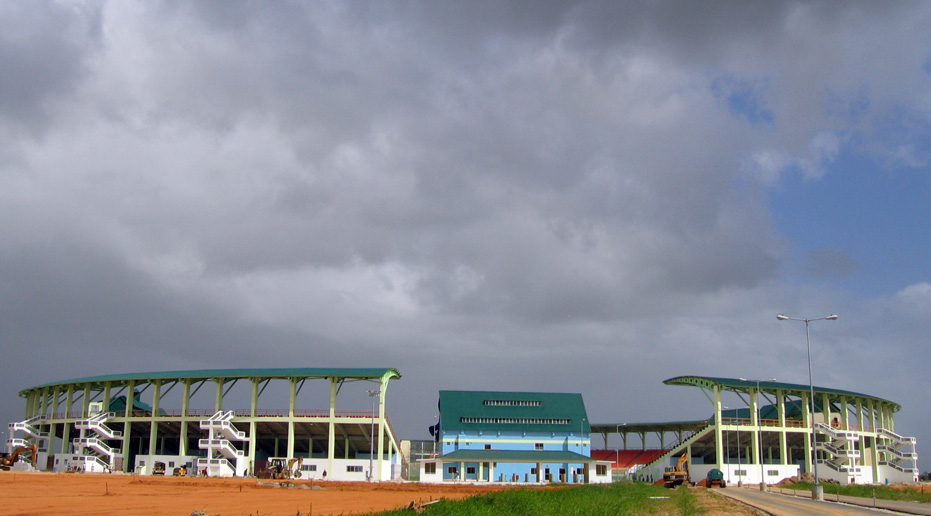
Providence Stadium as seen from the East Bank Highway

The major sports in Guyana are cricket (Guyana is part of the West Indies cricket team for international cricket purposes), basketball, football and volleyball. Minor sports include softball cricket (beach cricket), field hockey, netball, rounders, lawn tennis, table tennis, boxing, squash, rugby, horse racing and a few others.

Guyana played host to international cricket matches as part of the 2007 Cricket World Cup (CWC 2007). The new 15,000-seat Providence Stadium, also referred to as Guyana National Stadium, was built in time for the World Cup and was ready for the beginning of play on 28 March. At the first international game of CWC 2007 at the stadium, Lasith Malinga of the Sri Lankan team took four wickets in four consecutive deliveries.

Guyana Amazon Warriors is a team representing Guyana in the Caribbean Premier League, with Providence Cricket Stadium as its home ground. The Caribbean Premier League is a Twenty20 league played every year in the Caribbean, hosted by the West Indies Cricket Board.

Guyana's national basketball team has traditionally been one of the top contenders at the CaribeBasket, the top international basketball tournament for countries in the Caribbean.

For international football purposes, Guyana is part of CONCACAF. The highest league in their club system is the GFF Elite League. Guyana's national football team has never qualified for the FIFA World Cup; however, they qualified for the Caribbean Cup in 1991, finishing fourth, and 2007. In 2019, they qualified for the CONCACAF Gold Cup for the first time, after finishing seventh in the qualifiers. They finished third in Group D, having lost two matches and drawn one.

Guyana also has five courses for horse racing.

Guyana featured a beach volleyball team at the 2019 South American Beach Games.

== See also ==
- Outline of Guyana

== Sources ==
This article incorporates text from a free content work. Licensed under CC BY 4.0 (license statement/permission). Text taken from Global Forest Resources Assessment 2025, Food and Agriculture Organization of the United Nations (FAO).
