= List of protected areas of Guyana =

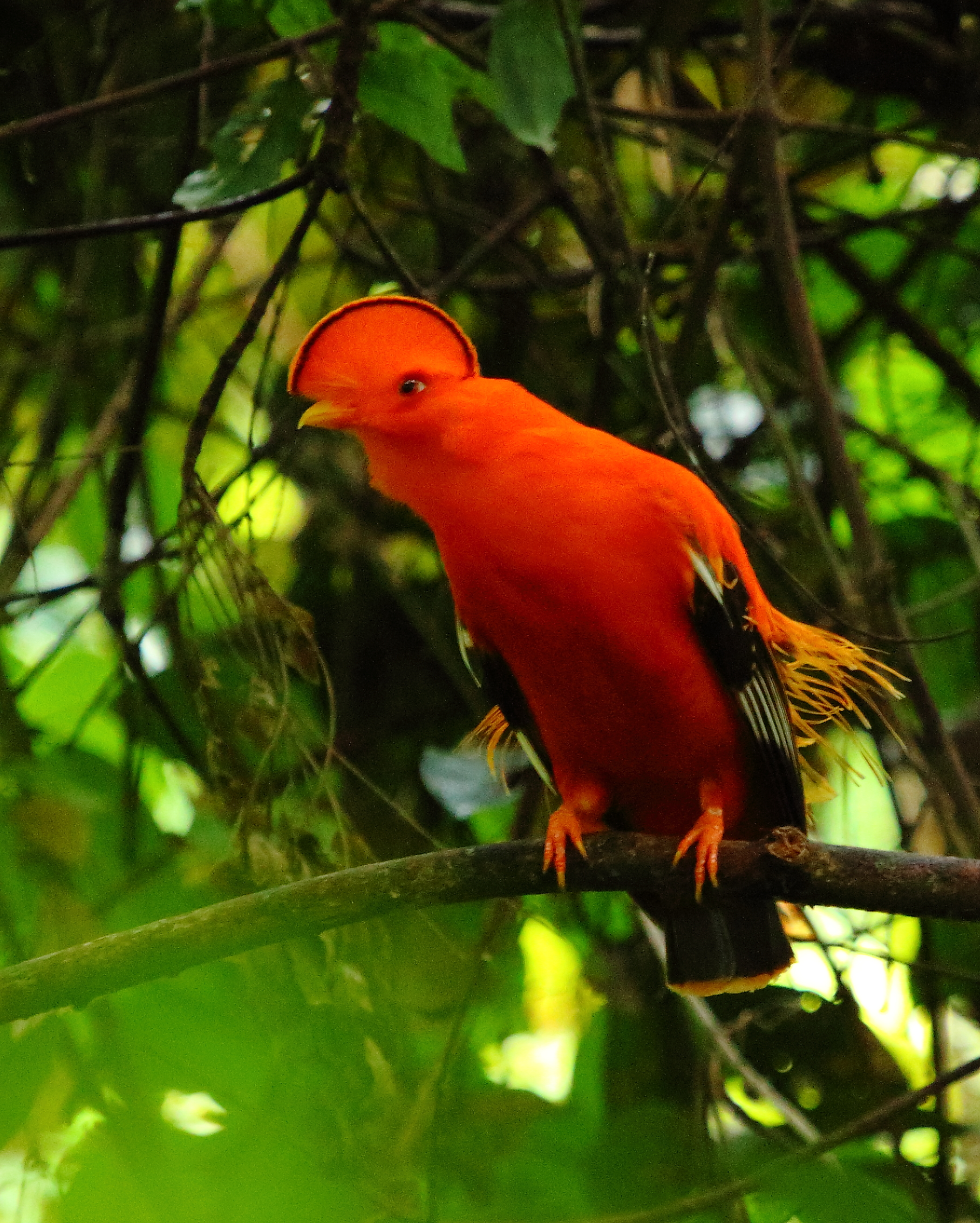
Guianan cock-of-the-rock in Iwokrama Forest

There are several protected areas of Guyana. The oldest protected area is the Kaieteur National Park which covers 627 square kilometres (242 sq mi). In 2011, the National Protected Areas System (NPAS) was established. As of 2020, about 8.4% of the country is protected.

== Nature reserves and parks ==
- Iwokrama International Centre. 1996. 3,716 km^{2}.
- Kaieteur National Park. 1929. 630 km^{2}.
- Kanashen Amerindian Protected Area. 2007. 6,486 km^{2}.
- Kanuku Mountains Protected Area. 2011. 6,110 km^{2}.
- Shell Beach Protected Area. 2011. 32 km^{2}.

== Urban Parks ==
Protected Areas Trust also protects the following urban parks:

- Joe Vieira Park
- Guyana Botanical Gardens
- Guyana National Park
- Guyana Zoo
