= Waiwai language =

Cariban language spoken in Brazil and Guyana

Waiwai
- Wai Wai
- Native to: Brazil, Guyana, Suriname
- Ethnicity: Wai-Wai
- Native speakers: (2,200 cited 1990–2006)
- Language family: Cariban: Parukotoan; Waiwai languages; Waiwai
- Dialects: Katawiana; Karafawyana

Official status
- Official language in: Brazil (Amazonas)

Language codes
- ISO 639-3: waw
- Glottolog: waiw1244
- ELP: Waiwai
- Linguasphere: 80-AHB-ca
- 80-AHB-cb
- Waiwai is classified as Vulnerable by the UNESCO Atlas of the World's Languages in Danger

Waiwai /ˈwaɪwaɪ/ (Uaiuai, Uaieue, Ouayeone) is a Cariban language of northern Brazil, with a couple hundred speakers across the border in southern Guyana and Suriname.

== History ==
The Waiwai people are composed of an amalgamation of eight distinct peoples, these being the Mawayana, Hixkaryana, Katwena, Sherew, the uncontacted Karafawyana, Sikiana, Tunayana, and Parukoto. Two men of the Taruma people also lived among the Waiwai, but they died "several years" before 1998. A Waimiri-Atroari was also reported to live among them as of 1998, and a number of Tiriyó women had married into the Waiwai. The name "Waiwai" itself was originally applied to a now-extinct ninth group who spoke a language very similar to that of the Parukoto; the last original Waiwai died in the 1970s or earlier. All nine of these peoples had their own original languages or dialects. The Waiwai-Parukoto language subsequently became the lingua franca of these people, though some of the other languages were reported to still be used in the homes of the respective groups.

== Official status ==
Since 2023, Waiwai has been one of 17 official languages of Amazonas state in Brazil.

== Phonology ==
Equivalents in the Waiwai writing system are in ⟨angle brackets⟩.

=== Consonants ===
		Labial	Alveolar	Postalveolar	Dorsal	Glottal
Occlusive	nasal	m	n		ɲ ⟨n̂⟩	
Occlusive	oral		t	tʃ ⟨c⟩	k	
Continuant	voiceless	ɸ ⟨p⟩	s	ʃ ⟨x⟩		h
Continuant	voiced	w	ɺ ⟨r⟩	𝼈̻ ⟨r̂⟩	j ⟨y⟩	

Consonants /t, s, ʃ, tʃ, n, ɲ, ɺ, 𝼈̻, j/ are part of the "tense" group, which are realized more tensely, and the "relaxed" group is composed of /k, m, ɸ, w/, which are pronounced more relaxedly.

=== Vowels ===
	Front	Central	Back
High	i iː	ɨ ɨː ⟨î⟩	u uː
Mid	e eː		o oː
Low	a aː		

/o/ has an allophone of [ʌ] when following alveopalatal consonants /tʃ, ʃ/ (e.g. comota [tʃʌmota] 'forest', oyamoxoxon [ojamoʃʌʃʌn] 'my fingernail'). /a/ is realized as "less open and less low" [æ] when preceded by the consonants /j, tʃ/, and followed by /w, m, s/. Long vowels are written doubled.

== Writing system ==
As of 1998, 85% of Waiwai people, including "many" young people, were literate in their language.

== Morphology ==
=== Pronouns ===
Personal prefixes are more common than free pronouns in Waiwai; the latter are typically used when the person is considered "special or distinctive from others of a group".

Waiwai pronouns
Person	Animate		Inanimate
Person	Non-collective	Collective	Inanimate
1	owɨ		
1+2	kɨɨwɨ	kɨwjam	
1+3	amna		
2	amoro	amjamɺo	
Anaphoric
3	noro	ɲeʃamɺo	eɺo
Deictic
3 remote	mɨkɨ, mɨkro	mɨkjam	mɨnɨ
3 not far			moɺo
3 near	moso	moʃam	on, tan

Non-collective forms of a pronoun are used when "only the speaker and hearer are involved in an action", or as an indefinite pronoun; collective forms are used when there are multiple hearers.

Kɨɨw mak kajka.
1+2P only let's.go
'Let's go, just you and I.'

Awom-ɺa t-∅-a-sɨ kɨɨw ka-ji ɺo k-epɨɺka-tʃhe.
rise.up-NEG 1+2SBJ-be-SF-INP 1+2PRO high-from very 1+2-fall-after
'A person does not rise again after falling from very high.'

== Sample text ==
Taa, on wara mak ka ʃe w-∅-a-s a-wja oj-akno, tan aw-eʃi-taw tʃuh-wa-ka-n komo ∅-tʃ-e-tkeɲe.
all.right this like just say DESI 1SBJ-be-SF-INP 2-to 1POSR-brother here 2-be-while grass(forest)-LOC-to-NMLZR COLL 3SBJ-go-SF-UP+COLL
'All right, this is what I will say to you my brother, while you were here people went to the forest.'
