= Kanashen =

Kanashen Konashen
- Village
- Location within Guyana
- Coordinates: 1.6261°N 58.6526°W
- Country: Guyana
- Region: Upper Takutu-Upper Essequibo

Area
  - Total: 6,485.67 km^{2} (2,504.13 sq mi)

Population (2012)
  - Total: 201
  - Density: 0.0310/km^{2} (0.0803/sq mi)
- Time zone: UTC-4

The Kanashen (or Konashen) Community Owned Conservation (COCA) is Guyana's first community-owned area that is legally protected; it is primarily inhabited by the Wai-Wai Indigenous group.

Kanashen houses the headwaters of the Essequibo River, Guyana's principal water source, and encompasses the southern portion of its watershed, which drains the Kassikaityu, Kamoa, Sipu and Chodikar rivers. The main mountains are the Wassarai, Yahore, Komoa and Kaiawakua, with elevations up to about 1200 metres above sea level.

== Bio-diversity ==
=== Flora ===
The biology of the Kanashen district is relatively unstudied, except for its flora. Botanically, the area has many species found only in the area and is covered by four general vegetation types, which have remained almost completely intact. The main vegetation types are tall evergreen highland forest and tall/medium evergreen lower montane forest. There are also small areas of tall evergreen flooded riparian forest and lowland shrub savanna. Species such as Manyokinaballi (Geissospermum spp.) and Kakaralli (Eschweilera) are the most common of the 192 species recorded.

=== Fauna ===
The area contains important fauna such as giant river otters (Pteronura brasiliensis), the cock of the rock (Rupicola rupicola), the giant harpy eagle (Harpia harpyja) and other animals that support the livelihood of the Wais-Wais. Three globally threatened species inhabit the COCA: the Giant Armadillo (Priodontes maximus), one of the Harlequin Toads (Atelopus spumarius) and the Brazilian Tapir (tapirus terrestris). The Giant Anteater (Myrmecophaga tridactyla), jaguars (Panthera onca), labba (Agouti paca), peccary (Tayassu spp.) and forest deer (Mazama spp.) are also known to occur in the area.

=== Birds ===
Results of community-based bird surveys at three sites recorded 117 species, approximately 16% of the total number of species recorded in Guyana. This number was increased by an additional 100 species identified during a rapid biological assessment study. Some of the birds present in the COCA are the Screaming Piha (Lipaugus vociferans), White-tailed Trogon (Trogon viridis), Painted Parakeet (Pyrrhura picta), Golden-headed Manakin (Pipra erythrocephala), several species of parrots and macaw including the Scarlet (Ara macao), Red Shouldered (Diopsittaca nobilis) and Blue and Yellow (Ara ararauna) Macaws, and species of antbirds (Thamnophilidae) and toucans (Ramphastidae).

== Location ==
The community lies within the Kanashen Indigenous District in the tropical wilderness of remote southern Guyana. The area covers 625,000 hectares of pristine rainforest and is considered by many to be the last of the pristine frontier rainforest in Guyana. It encompasses the watershed of the Essequibo River (Guyana's major water source) and the tributaries of the Kassikaityu, Kamoa, Sipu and Chodikar rivers. The site contains the Wassarai, Yahore, Komoa and Kaiawakua mountains with elevations as high as 1200 meters above sea level. The pristine state of the area is due to the extremely low population density (about 0.032 humans/km2) and the difficult terrain, which negatively affects accessibility and the economic viability of potential extractive industries.

== People and culture ==
The only community—Masakenari ('the place of the Mosquito')—is located in the area and is inhabited by the Wai-Wai populace. It was established in January 2000 when flooding forced the community to move from its previous location at Akotopono, six kilometers northeast of Masakenari. In the past, the Wai Wai people in Kanashen periodically changed the location of their villages. This reflects the agro-practice of shifting cultivation in which an area in the forest is cleared, occupied and cultivated for a period before its inhabitants move on to another area. This practice facilitates habitat and soil rejuvenation in the fragile ecosystem of a tropical rainforest. The Wai Wai people have a rich cultural history; many traditions and customs are still observed. Over millennia they have kept a close spiritual, cultural and social relationship with their environment and its resources. For instance, hunters do not eat of their own kill because of the Wai-Wai traditional belief that some plants and animals carry the spirit of their hunter/gatherer. Since the mid 20th century, the Wai Wai community has practiced Christianity, traveling long distances for regular spiritual gatherings with Wai Wai groups in Brazil and Suriname. The primary language spoken in this community is Wai Wai, but English functions as a second language for interaction outside the community, with government, partners, and in the educational system.

== Socio-economic information ==
The community of Masakenari has a resident population of approximately 203 persons in 34 households. The community is primarily Wai Wai but also contains a few members of other Amerindian groups, mainly Wapishana and Trio. The community has a school with nursery, primary and secondary classes for 56 pupils. It is staffed by one head teacher assisted by three teaching staff. The average level of educational attainment in the village is seven years, the equivalent of Form 4 in the Guyanese education system and the highest level of schooling that is available in most villages. The community also has a health centre that is equipped to provide basic health care services and is staffed by a community health worker.

The community is serviced by solar powered electricity and water systems. There is an airstrip located 9 kilometers from the village, which is usable during the dry season or when the ground is dry enough to permit landing in the rainy season. Masakenari can also be accessed by river from Erepoimo, the nearest village, by traveling down the Kuyuwini River and then up the Essequibo. There is also a trail connecting the village to Erepoimo. The journey can take up to two weeks with optimal river and trail conditions. Low water in the dry season or flooded trails during the rainy season can make the trip longer and more difficult, even isolating the community at times.

Masakenari can be classified as having a subsistence economy; the primary economic activities in the community are farming, hunting, and fishing. The practice of barter is widely used within the community, although there is a gradual transition to a cash economy in order to purchase items for household use such as clothing, cooking utensils, wares, and certain foodstuffs from businesses outside the village. Aside from the few persons with permanent employment, most households have only occasional access to cash income. Seasonal migration occurs frequently, primarily in the form of men leaving the village to work as laborers in other parts of Guyana or in Brazil. A large number of households have family members, especially children and siblings, living permanently outside the community in order to obtain employment or to attend secondary school or other educational programs. Marriage is another commonly reported reason for leaving the village. Households can and do occasionally supplement their income through craftmaking, sewing, wildlife trading, mining, and the sale of agricultural products such as farine (a staple food made from cassava) and salted fish. Some permanent employment exists in the village, including the community health worker, the hinterland affairs worker, and the teachers. As the elected village leader, the Touchau also receives a monthly stipend.

== Governance ==
The head of the community is the Kayaritomo (Chief/Touchau), who is supported by a deputy Touchau and the council members. Elections to fill these positions are held in accordance with national laws every three years. Kanashen District is administered together with the Deep South Sub-district of Region Nine. The Kayaritomo and the council are supported by several persons within the community including the church elders, women's group, community health worker, hinterland affairs worker, youth leaders and the teachers. The rest of the community is also involved in decision making from time to time as it is the practice of the community leadership to keep the community informed and involved through community meetings to discuss major issues.
