= Shell Beach, Guyana =

Protected beach in Guyana

Shell Beach
- IUCN category VI (protected area with sustainable use of natural resources)
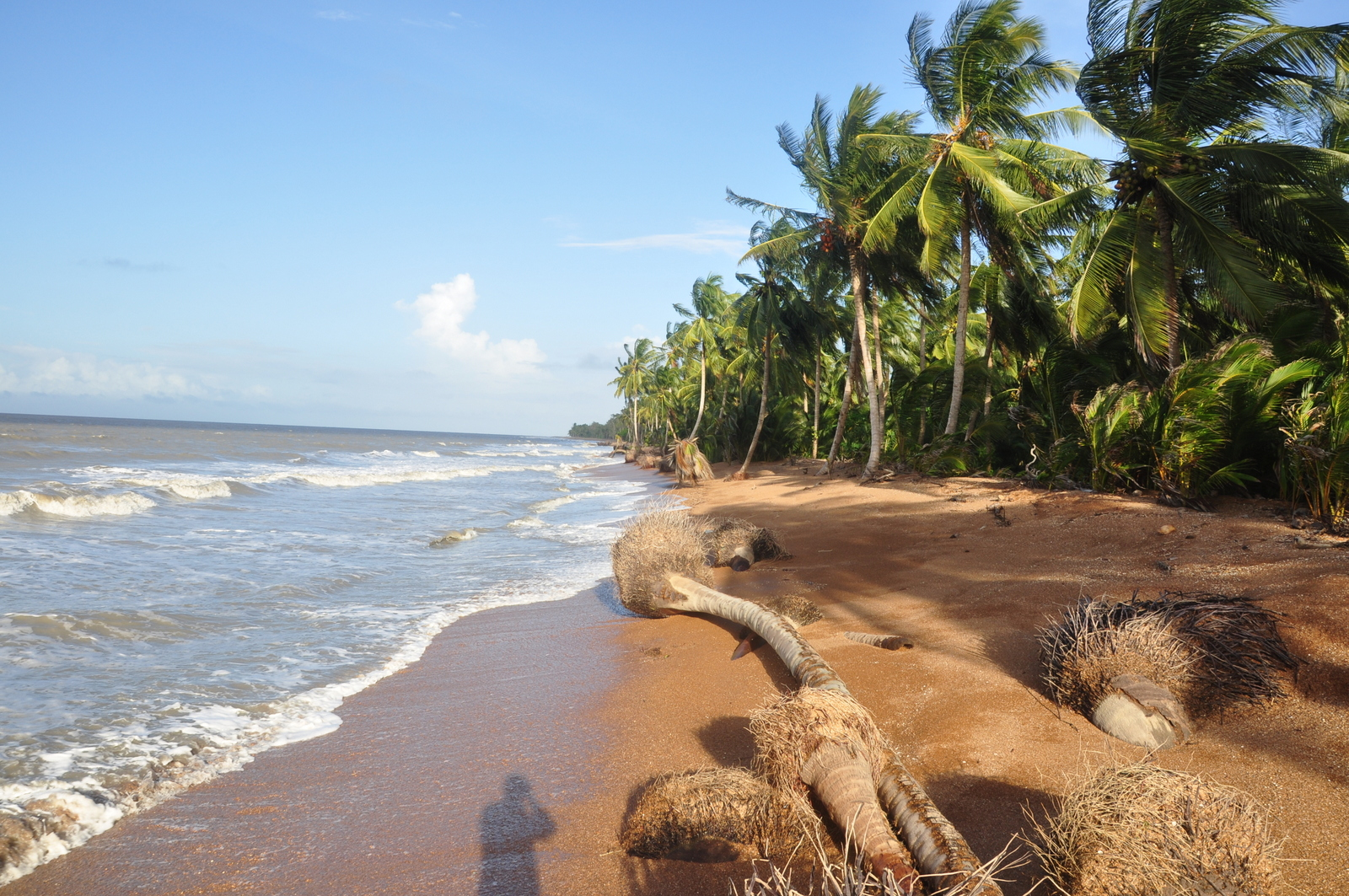
- Coconut Trees on the Shell Beach

- Location within Guyana
- Location: Barima-Waini, Guyana
- Nearest city: Mabaruma
- Coordinates: 8.291676°N 59.556988°W
- Area: 31.77 km^{2} (12.27 sq mi)
- Established: 2011
- Governing body: Protected Areas Trust

Shell Beach, located on the Atlantic coast of Guyana in the Barima-Waini Region, near the Venezuelan border, is a nesting site for four of the eight sea turtle species - the Green, Hawksbill turtle, Leatherback and the Olive Ridley. Shell Beach extends for approximately 120 km.

Turtles at Shell Beach were historically hunted by locals for meat and eggs; English ecologist Peter Pritchard began visiting the beach in the 1960s, after which he began making efforts to conserve the turtles and their habitats. He and Romeo De Freitas founded the Guyana Marine Turtle Conservation Society and Pritchard would be dubbed "Hero of the Planet" by Time in 2000. Since 2001, Shell Beach has been part of a protected area organised by the World Wide Fund for Nature and local groups. As of 2011, it is a protected area, and Amerindians from the local communities of Almond Beach, Gwennie Beach, and nine other villages within the area are involved in the programme.
