= Wai-wai people =

Wai-wai
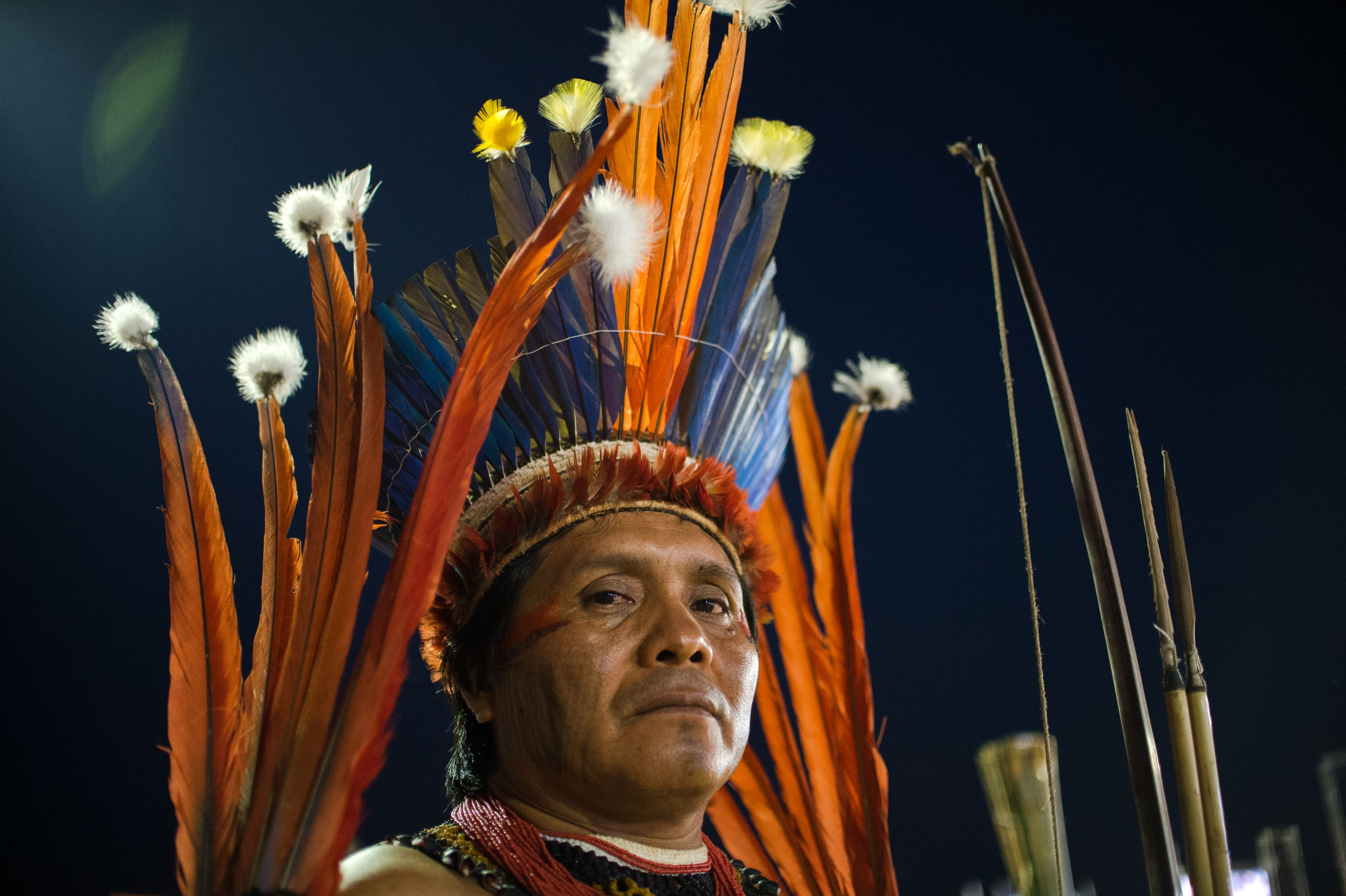
- Wai-wai man

Total population
- 2,672

Regions with significant populations
- Brazil: 2,502 (2014)
- Guyana: 170 (2006)

Languages
- Wai Wai language Various local languages

Religion
- Christianity, Animism

The Wai-wai (also written Waiwai or Wai Wai) are a Carib-speaking Indigenous people of Guyana and northern Brazil. Their society consists of different lowland forest peoples who have maintained much of their cultural identity with the exception of Christianity which was introduced to them in the late 1950s. They are composed of six smaller ethnic groups, being the Shereo, Parukoto, Mawayana, Tunayana, Katwena, and Taruma.

The Umana Yana in Georgetown, Guyana, takes its name from the Wai-Wai for "meeting place".

== Early contact ==
The explorer, Sir Robert Schomburgk, may have been the first western to have contact with the Wai-Wai in December 1837. He found one village on a tributary of the Essequebo river, along with two others on the Mapuera River in Brazil. Schomburgk describes the Wai-Wai as follows:

"Of medium height, their skin lighter than that of Tarumas, in their general appearance and language they resemble the Makuskis a good deal. The Woyawais are great hunters and celebrated for their dogs. In appearance they are generally dirty."

During the early 20th century, some of the Wai-Wai in Brazil moved further north. It is speculated that this is because of the influenza epidemic that nearly exterminated the Taruma tribe. From 1933 to 1938, the Wai-Wai people moved deeper in Guyana's interior to avoid the outsiders working with the Boundary Commission.

== Geography ==
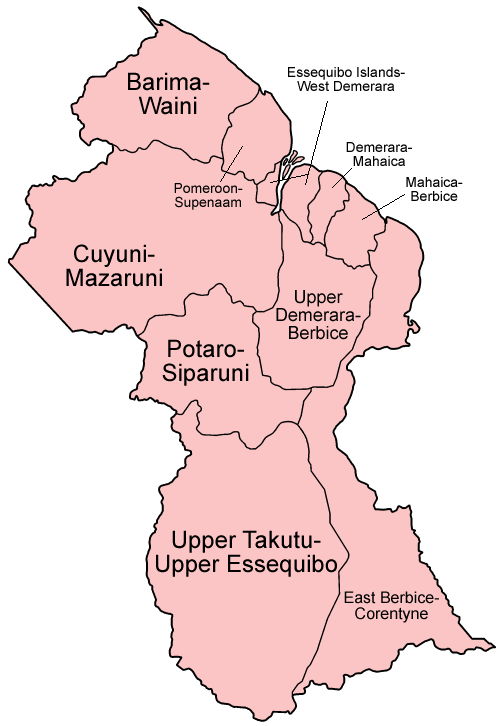
Regions in Guyana.

The Wai-wai in Guyana live in the far south of the country, near the headwaters of the Essequibo River. There are approximately 200 Wai-wai in Guyana, region of the country known as Kanashen. It is also a community-owned conservation area.

There are about 2,000 Wai-wai in Brazil, and they mostly reside in Terra Indígena Wai-wai, Terra Indígena Trombetas-Mapuera, and Terra Indígena Nhamundá-Mapuera. These are located mainly in the northern states of Roraima and Pará. Settlements include: Mapuera in Pará and Jatapu-zine, Catual, Cobra, Pequeno Paraíso in Roraima.

== Culture ==
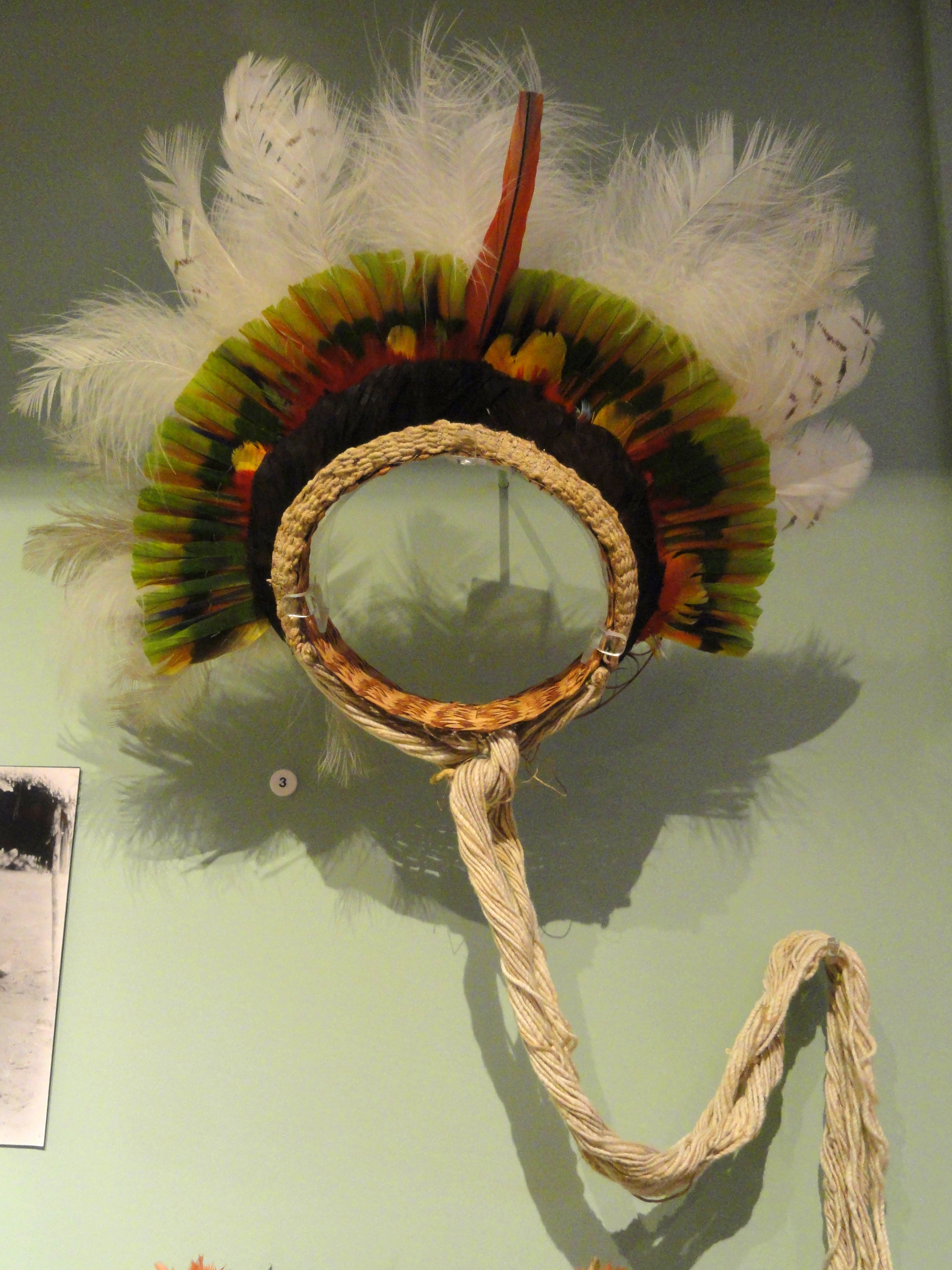
The Wai-Wai Headdress.

Though the Wai Wai are great hunters, they are also farmers. However, the light, thin soil they have to work with and an annual rainfall of 4 meters can make it very challenging to produce enough food. Their traditional method of farming was the 'slash and burn' method.

The Wai Wai are known for their weaving. They twist cotton into yarn for weaving, but they (along with Lokono and Kalina people) are known for their hammock weaving. All the hammocks are woven on square hammock frames. Their other artistic skills include pottery, woven combs, bone flutes, and other crafts.

Consuming primate meat is a source of pride for Waiwai, distinguishing them as “‘true’ forest people” and making them distinct from most other Indigenous groups in Guyana. Primate hunting can be a way to demonstrate masculinity and improve chances of betrothal. Various primate body parts have different non-game uses, from saki tail dusters to bone arrow points.

The Wai Wai have an affinity for musical instruments such as guitars, flutes, and hand drums. Often the Wai Wai people will craft their flutes and drums out of natural materials found in the surrounding Amazon rainforest.

=== Women ===
Women play a crucial role in the Wai-Wai culture. In terms of Wai-Wai constructs, the men's success in terms of wealth and power are dependent on female labor and reproduction. The size and stability of a village are dependent on cultural values and how relationships are tied. For the Wai-Wai, the relationship between a father and daughter lends a sense of control to the father over his daughter and son-in-law.

A village size is the indication of the level of political strength and riches, and thus heavily reliant on the women in the community.

==== Marriage ====
Mansiya is marriage. For women, marriage cannot take place until after women have reached their first menses at around age thirteen. Most women are married by the age of seventeen.

== Religion ==
The yaskomo of the Waiwai, also called a medicine man or shaman in literature, is believed to be able to perform a soul flight. The soul flight can serve several functions:

- healing
- flying to the sky to consult cosmological beings (the moon or the brother of the moon) to get a name for a new-born baby
- flying to the cave of peccaries' mountains to ask the father of peccaries for abundance of game
- flying deep down in a river, to achieve the help of other beings.

Thus, a yaskomo is believed to be able to reach sky, earth, water, in short, every element.

Western influence has severely changed their traditional culture and religion. Many have converted to Christianity. In 1949, many of the Wai-Wai people chose to migrate to Brazil following the heavy persecution, violent imprisonment and forceful extradition of Christian missionaries by the authoritarian government run by Forbes Burnham at the time. Many of the missionaries were well liked among much of the tribe. When the missions had to leave Guyana because their residence permits were not renewed, 700 Wai-Wai people followed them to Brazil. Some 150 Wai-Wai people left in Guyana fell under the influence of Christian Brethren Bible Outreach.

== Language ==
There are several thousand speakers of the Wai Wai language, though the Carib-speaking Wai Wai Indians have close affinities to another Amazonian group known as the Arara.

The Wai Wai have a history of intermarriage with other Indigenous groups who speak similar languages.

== Settlements ==
Wai-wai people are split between modern day Guyana and Brazil (Roraima).

- In Guyana they reside in one community
  - Konashen Amerindian Community, with an officially titled land area of 648,860 ha. Population of 201.
- In Brazil, they reside in three Indigenous territories
  - WaiWái Indigenous territory, with a land area of 405,698 ha. Population of 365.
  - Trombetas/Mapuera Indigenous territory (shared with Hixkaryana, Isolados Karapawyana, and Katuenayana peoples), with a land area of 3,970,898 ha. Population of 811.
  - Nhamundá-Mapuera Indigenous territory (shared with Hixkaryana, Katuenayana, and Kaxuyana peoples), with a land area of 1,049,520 ha. Population of 2,293.

== Konashen Community Owned Conservation Area ==
The Wai-Wai people in the Konashen District of Guyana created the nation's first Community Owned Conservation Area (COCA). This area is legally protected under regulations passed by the Guyana parliament. 625,000-hectare is a protected area that was developed with the technical and financial support of Conservation International. The Wai-Wai people were given the formal title to this land in 2004, and has worked with Guyana's Environmental Protection Agency and the Ministry of Amerindian Affairs to develop COCA. The goal is that the area will bring economic benefit to the Wai Wai, and protect a large part of the rainforest. Because the Wai Wai have kept a deep cultural and spiritual relationship with the Earth, protecting natural resources and biodiversity in this region is a main objective.

The COCA community is open to visitors all over the world, and protecting the plants and animals are valuable to the Wai-Wai's everyday life. The Wai-Wai people have said that the rainforest produces the air they breathe, keeps soil in place as not to clog waterways, provides foods (nuts, fruit, fresh fish), is a source for natural medicines, and many more. The Konashen Indigenous District in Southern Guyana is the headwaters of the Essequibo River. This river remains Guyana's main source for water, and drains the Kassikaityu, Kamoa, Sipu and Chodikar rivers.

== See also ==
- Indigenous peoples in Guyana
- Indigenous peoples in Brazil
