= Kanuku Mountains =

Mountain range in Guyana

- IUCN category VI (protected area with sustainable use of natural resources)
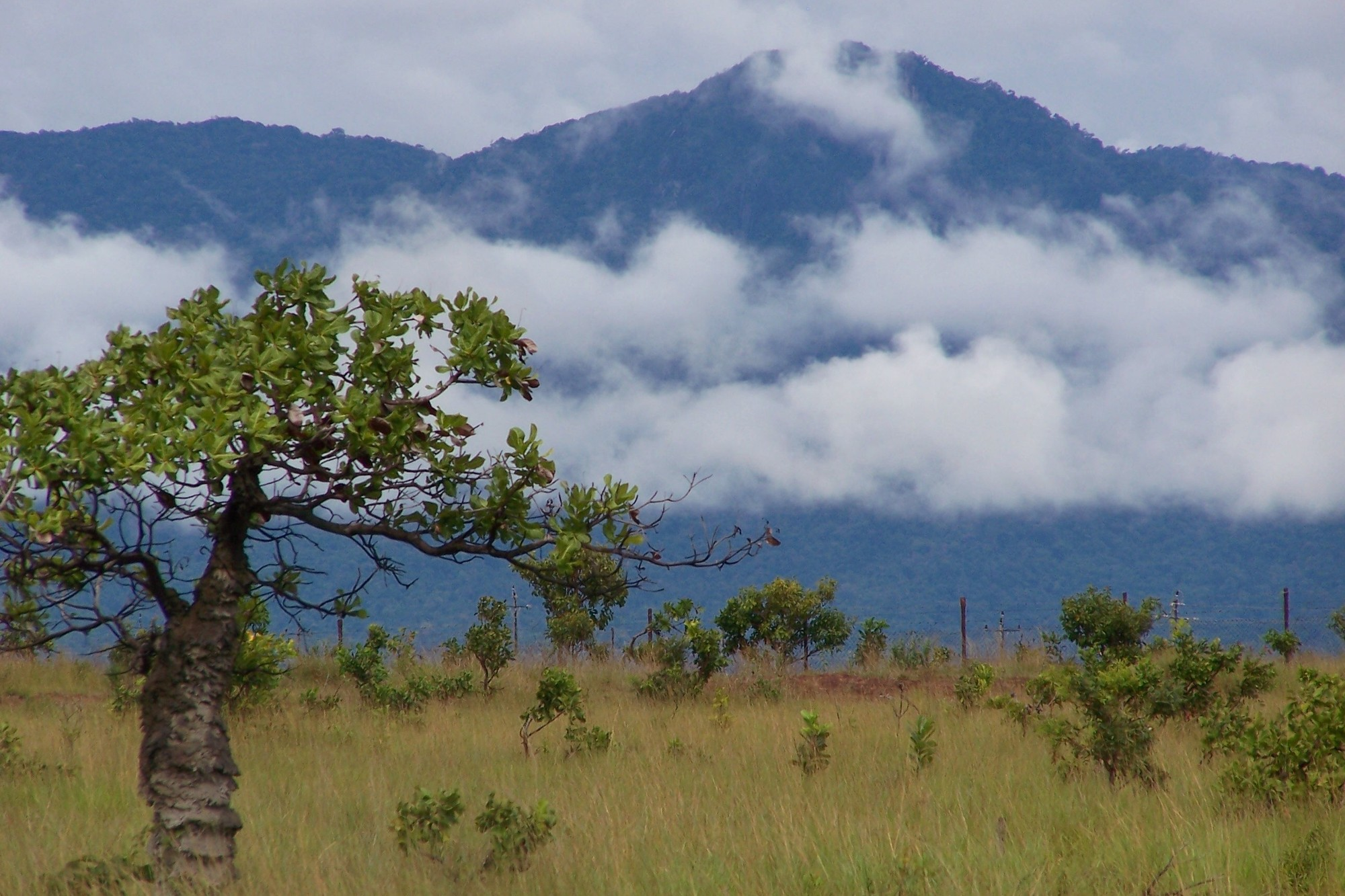
- Kanuku Mountains as seen from Lethem

- Location within Guyana
- Location: Upper Takutu-Upper Essequibo, Guyana
- Nearest city: Lethem
- Coordinates: 3°12′N 59°35′W
- Area: 6,110 km^{2} (2,360 sq mi)
- Established: 2011
- Governing body: Protected Areas Trust

The Kanuku Mountains are a group of mountains in Guyana, located in the Upper Takutu-Upper Essequibo region. The name means 'forest' in the Wapishana language, a reference to the rich diversity of wildlife found there. The Eastern Kanuku Mountains and the Western Kanuku Mountains are separated by the Rupununi River. In 2011, the mountains were designated National Protected Area.

== History ==
The lowland forests sustain 53% of all the known bird species in Guyana, and about 70% of all mammals found in Guyana, live in the Kanuku Mountains. Prominent species include the Giant otter, the Harpy eagle and the Arapaima. The highest peak of the Kanuku Mountains rises to 1,067 metres while the savannah area varies between 120 and 150 metres.

In 2011, the mainly uninhabited area was protected, and designated a National Protected Area. It is being maintained by the Kanuku Mountains Project. The conservation area measures 611,000 hectares (6,110 km^{2}). The area around the mountains is inhabited by the Macushi and Wapishana people in 21 communities who use the resources of mountains for their subsistence living.

== See also ==
- Rupununi

== Bibliography ==
- Protected Areas Commission (2015). "Kanuku Mountains Protected Area Management Plan" (PDF). Ministry of Natural Resources.
