= Rouge =

Rouge is the French word for "red" and may refer to:

== Compounds ==
- Rouge (cosmetics), a cosmetic used to color the cheeks and emphasize the cheekbones
- Jeweler's rouge or iron(III) oxide
- Rouging, a form of corrosion applicable to stainless steel

== People and characters ==
- Adrien de Rougé (1782–1838), French statesman
- Aurélie Rouge (born 1992), Martiniquais footballer
- Caesar Rougé (born 2002), French footballer
- Emmanuel de Rougé (1811–1872), French Egyptologist
- Guillaume le Rouge (1385–1450), Dutch musician
- Rouge (rapper), South African female rapper
- Roger Rouge (born 1914), Swiss sailor

=== Characters ===
- Rouge (Power Stone), a character in Power Stone media
- Rouge (Ranma½), a character in Ranma ½ media
- Rouge the Bat, a character in Sonic the Hedgehog media
- Rouge, the titular character from the 2016 Chinese TV show Rookie Agent Rouge
- Cure Rouge, the magical girl alias of Rin Natsuki from Yes! PreCure 5
- Riana Rouge, the titular character from the adult action adventure game Riana Rouge
- Madame Rouge, a DC Comics supervillainess

== Places ==
- Rõuge, a settlement in Estonia
- Rõuge Parish, Estonia
- Rouge, Toronto, Ontario, Canada; a neighbourhood in Toronto
- Rougé, Châteaubriant, Châteaubriant-Ancenis, Loire-Atlantique, Pays de la Loire, France
- La Rouge, Val-au-Perche, Ceton, Mortagne-au-Perche, Orne, Normandy, France
- Mount Rouge, Graham Land, Antarctic Peninsula, Antarctica; a mountain
- Mont Rouge, Pennine Alps, Switzerland; a mountain
- Rouge River (disambiguation)
- Fort Rouge (disambiguation)
- Eau Rouge (Red Water), Belgium; a stream
- Zone Rouge, France; a zone of devastation after WWI

=== Facilities and structures ===
- The Rouge, Ford's production complex on the Rouge River in Dearborn, Michigan, USA
- Château Rouge, Bas-Oha, Wanze, Liège Province, Wallonia, Belgium; a chateau
- Eau Rouge corner, Spa-Francorchamps racetrack, Belgium; from the Belgian Grand Prix
- Rouge National Urban Park, Ontario, Canada

== Media ==
- Rouge FM, a Canadian French-language radio network
- Rouge (newspaper), a weekly newspaper published by the Revolutionary Communist League in France
- Rouge: The Sexiest Show in Vegas, a revue show at The Strat in Las Vegas, Nevada

=== Film and television ===
- Rouge (film), a 1988 Hong Kong film
- Rouge (film journal), an online film journal
- Rouge (TV series), an MTV series about an Asian girl band

=== Music ===
- La Rouge (tour), a concert tour by Red Velvet

Bands

- Rouge (German duo), an offshoot of the group Arabesque
- Rouge (group), a Brazilian girl group (2002–2006, 2017–2019)
- Rouge, an American band performing with Desmond Child

Albums

- Rouge (Rouge album), a 2002 album by pop group Rouge
- Rouge (Fredericks Goldman Jones album), 1993
- Rouge (Louis Sclavis Quintet album), 1992
- Rouge (Yuna album), a 2019 album by the Malaysian singer Yuna
- La Rouge (album), a 2005 album by Torngat

Songs

- "Rouge" (song), by Naomi Chiaki and covered by various artists
- "Rouge", a song on Miles Davis' 1957 album Birth of the Cool

== Organizations, groups, companies ==
- Air Canada Rouge, a discount airline subsidiary of Air Canada
- Parti rouge, an 1800s political party of Quebec
- Café Rouge, a British restaurant chain

== Sport ==
- Rouge (football) or single, a score of one point in Canadian football
- Rouge, better known as Rush (wrestler) (born 1988), Mexican professional
- A method of scoring in the Eton field game
- A historical method of scoring in Sheffield Rules football

== Other uses ==
- ROUGE (metric), an evaluation metric used in natural language processing
- Rouge de l'Ouest, a breed of sheep
- Rivina humilis, the rouge plant

== See also ==
- Rouging
- Red (disambiguation)
- Rougemont (disambiguation) and Rougemount
- Cap-Rouge (disambiguation) (French: Cape Rouge, lit. 'Cape Red')
- Morne Rouge (disambiguation) (French: Rouge Hill, lit. 'Red Hill')
- Moulin Rouge (disambiguation) (French: Rouge Mill, lit. 'Red Mill')
- Maison Rouge (disambiguation) (French: Rouge House, lit. 'Red House')
