= Cheval mirror =

Type of free-standing mirror

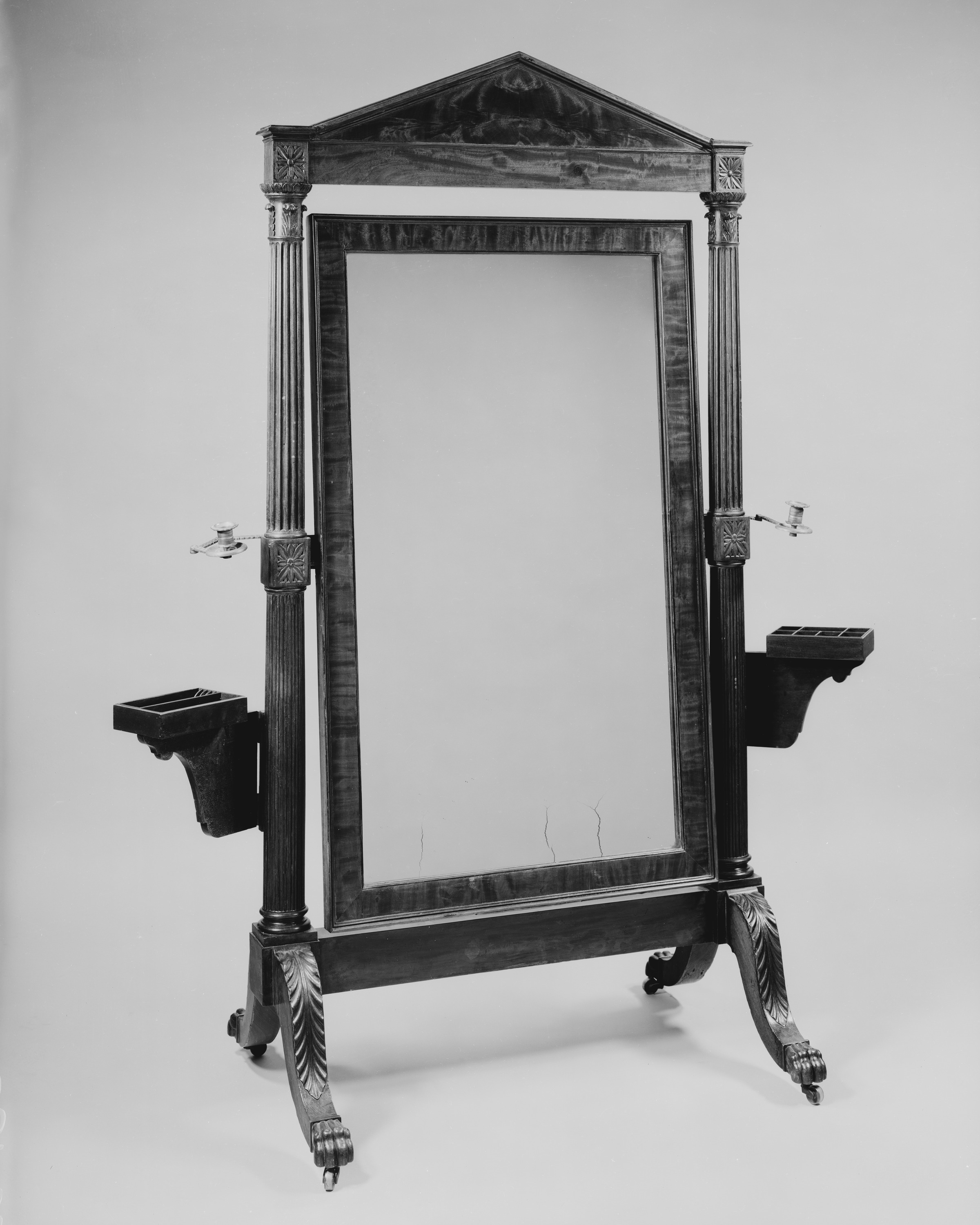
Cheval glass (USA, c. 1815)

The cheval glass (also cheval mirror, psyche mirror, horse dressing glass, swing glass) is a free-standing large mirror, usually with a tilt mechanism, that provided a complete reflection from head to foot (thus also the full-length mirror name). This furniture piece was created in the late 18th century for a dressing room and went out of fashion after being replaced by the mirrored doors of wardrobes in the first half of the 20th century.

== Construction ==
The mirror hangs between two vertical columns frequently connected by two horizontal planks in a frame-like arrangement. Each column rests on two splayed feet. The mirror features a tilt mechanism so that it can be used at different angles, and sometimes also has a height adjustment pulley with lead counterweights.

In 1803, Thomas Sheraton produced a design combined with a desk that included drawers on one side and writing surface on another.

== Etymology ==
The cheval comes from the French: cheval, "horse". Different explanations are given for the reason of its use:

- "horse" is a name for the adjustment pulley;
- cheval in a meaning of support framework (cf. French: chevalet, "easel");
- overall bulkiness and heavy weight;
- large mirror size that allowed a horse to be seen in its entirety.

The association between Psyche, a woman in the Greek mythology who became a goddess, and the mirror dates back to a book by Jean de La Fontaine, Les Amours de Psyché et de Cupidon (1669). La Fontaine retells the ancient Cupid and Psyche story using flowery language to describe an extravagant palace of Cupid with plenty of mirrors and fountains. In the book, Psyche takes a bath upon arrival in the palace, looks at herself in the mirror, and is washed yet again before spending a night of love with Cupid. While wandering through the palace afterwards, she stumbles upon a sculpture gallery of famous beauties whose good looks brought demise to their nations, like Helen of Troy and Armida of Damascus, and suddenly sees herself amidst them. While La Fontaine does not explain how this happened, a contemporary reader was familiar with mirrors on the walls and statues in front of these mirrors. The subsequent verse,

The Fair One, or in Tints or Sculpture, spies
Her rapturous Face where'er she turns her Eyes:
In Mirrours too, and in each chrystal Stream,
Which as her Form's reflected brighter seem.

where Psyche watches herself in mirrors with delight, triggered the use of French: psyche while referring to the full-length mirror once it was invented.

== History ==
Manufacturing of large mirrors was generally beyond the technological abilities of the humanity prior to the 18th century, although there were possibly few very old predecessors of a full-length mirror. Seneca describes some Hostius Quadra who enjoyed performing sex acts in front of the mirror, which should have been much larger than the typical handheld mirrors of Antiquity. Story of Medusa and Perseus suggests that it was possible to use a polished shield as a large-size mirror. A bronze mirror found in the grave of Marquis of Haihun in China (died in 53 BC) was 47 centimeters across (at the thickness of 12 millimeters).

Most researchers assume the cheval mirror to be a European invention (however, Wu Hung asserts that the furniture piece was first created in China using European glass panes). The European glass manufacturing breakthrough started in 1664, when Jean-Baptiste Colbert stole the secrets of mirror manufacturing from Venice, thus enabling the construction of the Hall of Mirrors in the Palace of Versailles. The size of individual mirrors was still small: the 17 seemingly large window-like panes in the Hall of Mirrors are in fact stitched from 357 small pieces of mirror glass. In 1687, Bernard Perrot developed a process of glass casting that enabled first truly large glass mirrors, impossible to make using the traditional glass blowing process. Martin Lister reported in 1699 seeing an 88 by 48 inches mirror with thickness of just 1/4 inch. The cost of mirror production rapidly decreased: in the beginning of the 18th century a 180 by 100 centimeters mirror would fetch a princely sum of 750 British pounds (and the larger 230 x 115 cm one was going for "astronomical" 3,000 pounds), the prices had halved by the 1730s. The mirrors were still predominantly installed on the walls, mostly in order to visually expand the indoor space. In China, the period of Emperor Kangxi saw the creation of a free-standing chaping mirror-screen.

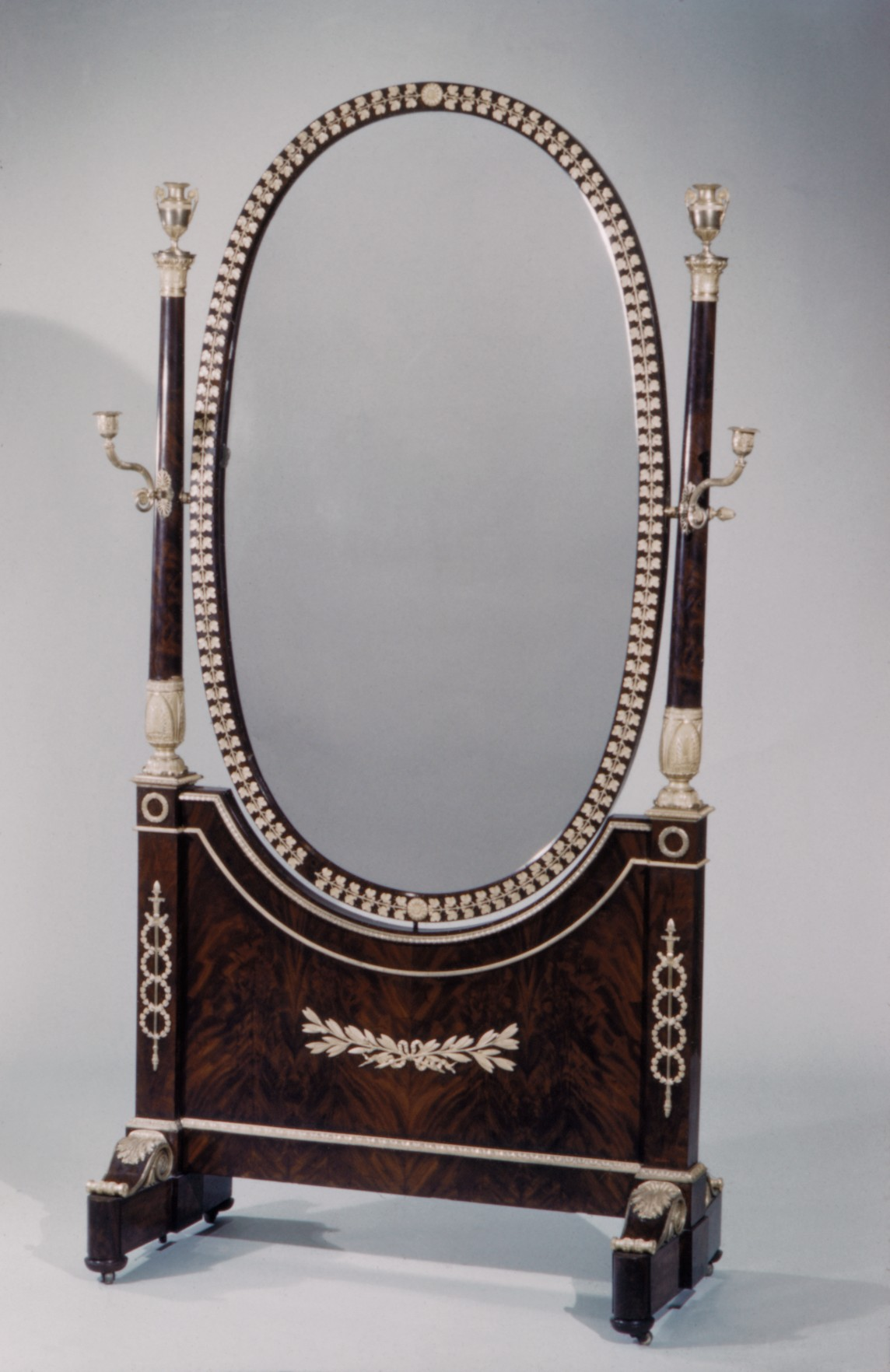
Psyche mirror (France, early 19th century)

In Europe, the cheval glasses of approximately the height of the human (1.5 to 2 meters) became popular in the late 18th century, originally referred to as glass screens (by analogy with decorative screens). In 1787, a visitor to Paris recorded the cheval mirror as a "pleasant invention", but by the 1820s-1830s this furniture item became a staple in every bourgeois' bedroom or dressing room. During the process, the mirror shape turned to oval, original harsh lines of the frame were softened, the angle adjustment mechanism was added, occasionally side mirrors were added to expand the reflected area.

== Art ==
The birth of photography coincided with the popularity of cheval mirrors, with superficial similarity between these devices: both produced images of surrounding life on glass surfaces. It did not take long for photographers to exploit the combination of the two: many pictures of nude females next to the cheval mirrors were produced by the commercial studios in the 1850s-1860s. A creative take on the mirror and photography belongs to Lady Clementina Hawarden: the mirror is used to reflect the camera, not the subject.

In the late 19th century, The Bath of Psyche painting by Frederic Leighton became an iconic expression of the tripartite unity of feminine beauty, classical art, and large mirror (the painter used the surface of the pool for the reflection effect). The artists pandering to the consumerist society found it easy to please customers through this combination and chose Psyche, a mortal turned into a goddess, as a representation of a woman, creating a new, commodified, image of this mythical figure in front of an eponymous mirror. Félix-Jacques Moulin became especially prolific in this field after opening a studio in Paris in 1851. Wu Hung mentions another image of this artist, a synthesis of Psyche and Narcissus, where a female kisses her reflection in the mirror that obviously represents a pond. The aestheticized images of academic art continued to exist in parallel to this exploitation, with a notable example of Berthe Morisot, who boldly used the "woman in front of a mirror" topic but replaced the voyeuristic aspect with female subjectivity.

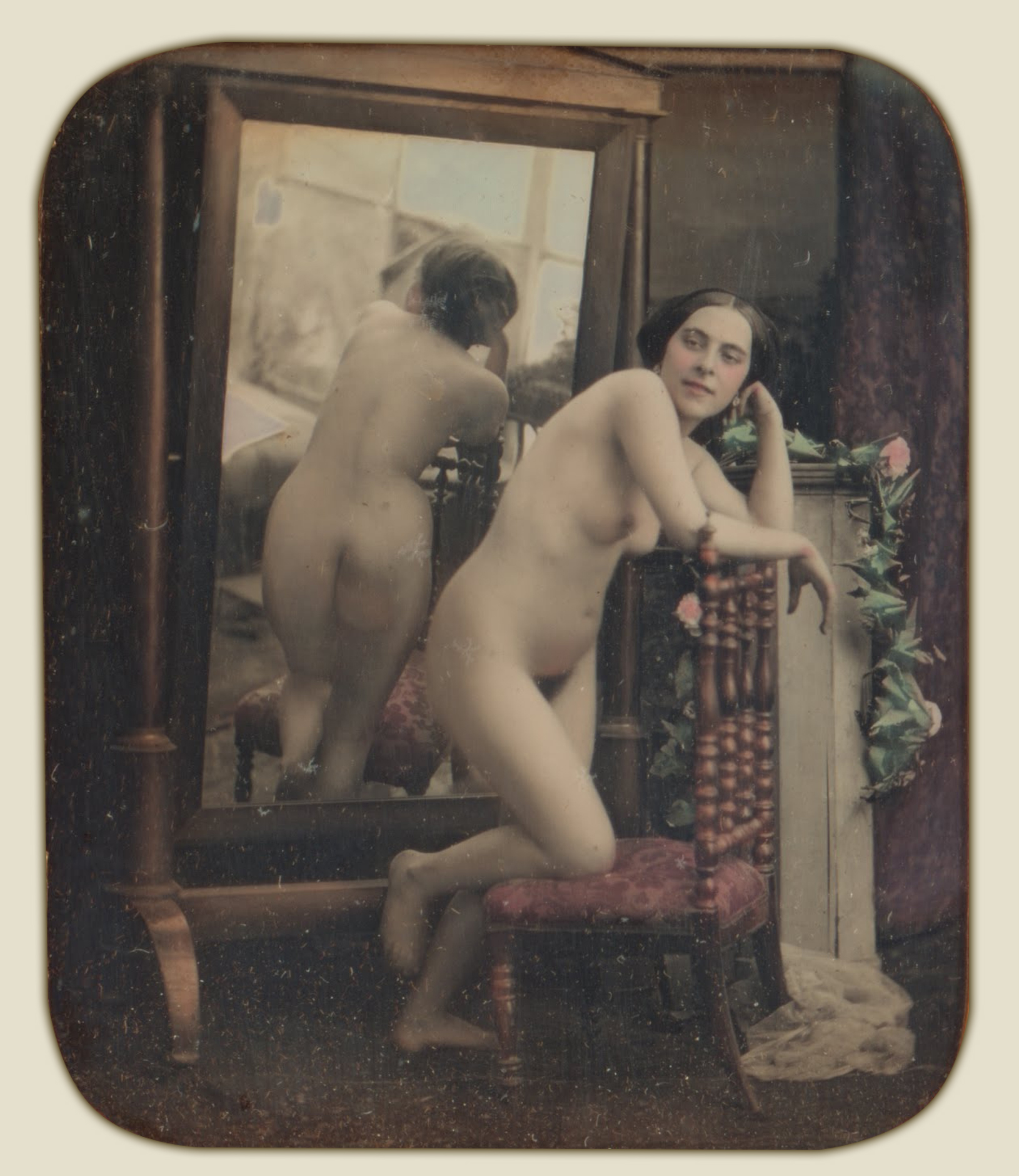
A nude by Félix-Jacques Moulin (1851)

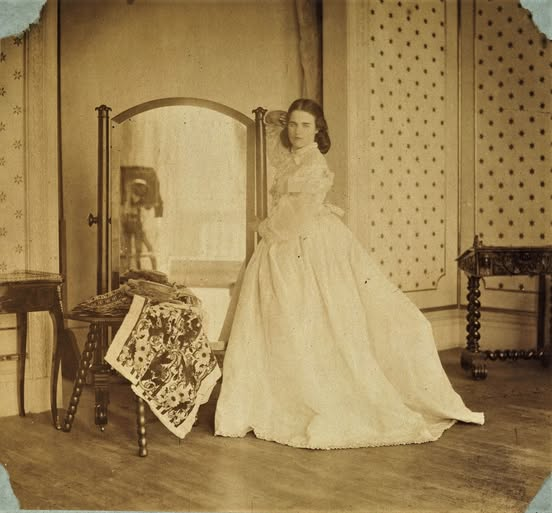
Camera reflection in a cheval mirror by Clementina Maude, Viscountess Hawarden (c. 1862)

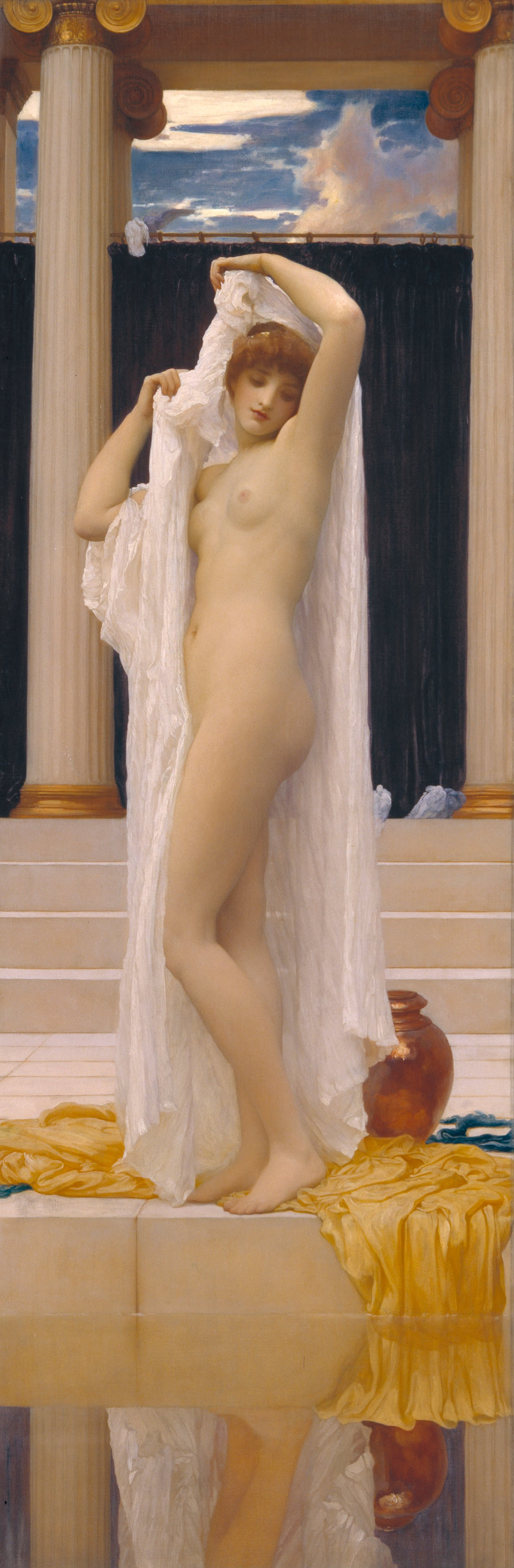
The Bath of Psyche by Frederic Leighton (1890)

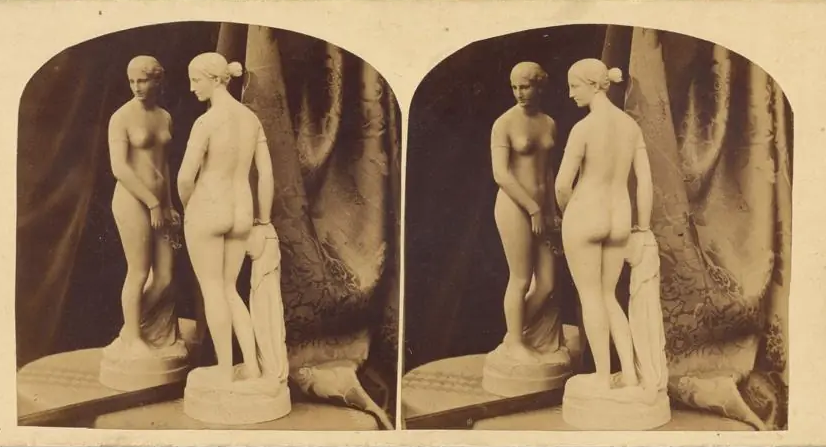
Venus in the Mirror (unknown artist, c. 1865)

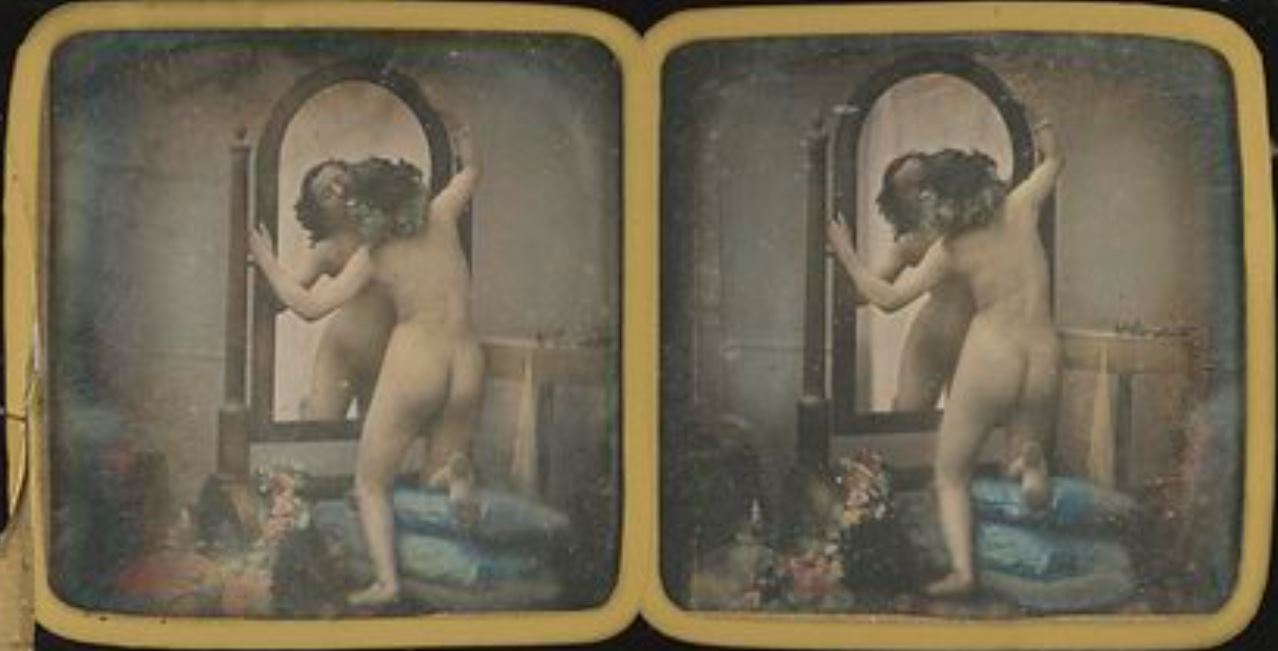
A nude kissing her reflection in the mirror by Felix Jacques Moulin (1854)

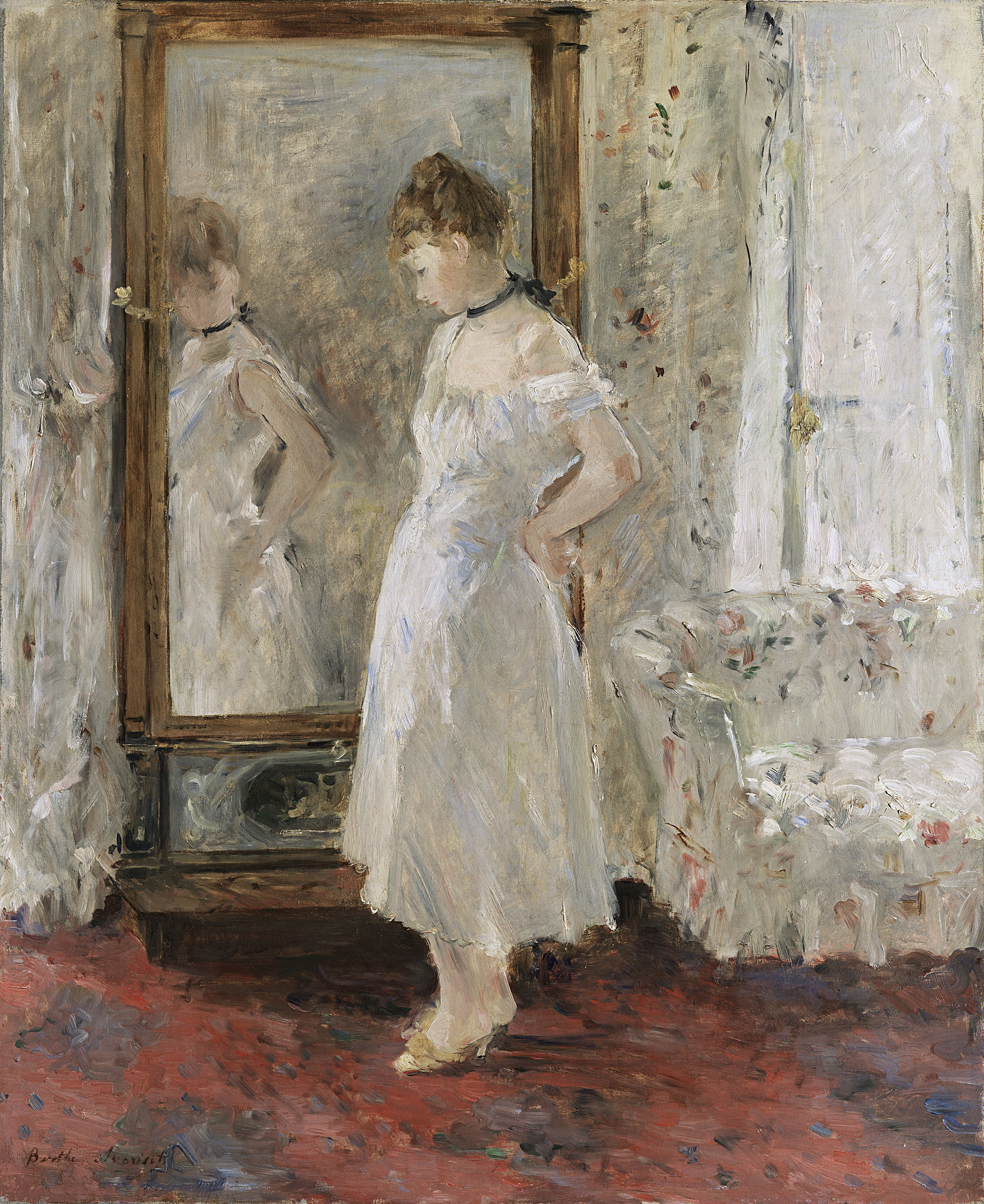
The Psyche Mirror by Berthe Morisot (1876)

== See also ==
- The Psyché (My Studio), a painting by Alfred Stevens

== Sources ==
- Barnette, M. (2013). "Cheval Glass". Dog Days and Dandelions: A Lively Guide to the Animal Meanings Behind Everyday Words. St. Martin's Publishing Group. ISBN 978-1-4668-5688-2.
- Gloag, John; Edwards, Clive (1991). "Cheval or Horse Dressing Glass". A Complete Dictionary of Furniture (Rev. ed.). Woodstock, N.Y.: Overlook Press. ISBN 0-87951-414-0.
- Hung, W. (2023). The Full-Length Mirror: A Global Visual History. Reaktion Books. ISBN 978-1-78914-610-3.
- Mitchell, J. (1908). Significant Etymology: Or, Roots, Stems, and Branches of the English Language. William Blackwood and sons. ISBN 978-1-9779-4305-7.
