= Moulin =

Moulin may refer to:

- Food mill, also known as a moulin or moulinette
- Moulin (geomorphology)
- Moulin (surname)
- Moulin, Scotland, a settlement
- Ruisseau du Moulin (île d'Orléans), Canada, a stream

== See also ==
- Moulin Rouge (disambiguation)
- Moulins (disambiguation)
