= Redhouse =

Redhouse may refer to:

== Places ==
- Redhouse, County Kilkenny, Ireland
- Redhouse, Eastern Cape, South Africa
  - Redhouse Yacht Club
- Redhouse, Kentucky, United States
- Redhouse, Maryland, United States
- Redhouse, Sunderland, England
- Redhouse Castle, in East Lothian, Scotland
- Redhouse Cymru, an arts centre in Merthyr Tydfil, Wales

== Other uses ==
- Redhouse (surname), including a list of people with the name
- Redhouse (band), 1970s Australian rock band

== See also ==
- Red House (disambiguation)
- Maison Rouge (disambiguation)
