= Rougemont =

Rougemont or de Rougemont may refer to:

== Places ==
- Rougemont, Quebec, Canada
  - Rougemont Airport
  - Mont Rougemont, part of the Monteregian Hills
- Rougemont, Côte-d'Or, France
- Rougemont, Doubs, France
- Rougemont-le-Château, Territoire de Belfort, France
  - Château de Rougemont
- Rougemont, Switzerland
- Rougemont, North Carolina, U.S.
- Rougemont Castle, in Exeter, Devon
  - Rougemont Gardens
- Rougemont Castle, Weeton, in North Yorkshire, England
- Rougemont – Chanteloup railway station in the Rougemont neighbourhood of Sevran, Paris, France
- Rougemont School, in Llantarnam, Wales

== People ==
- Denis de Rougemont (1906–1985), a Swiss writer and cultural theorist
- Louis de Rougemont (1847–1921), a Swiss explorer
- Marc de Rougemont (born 1972), a French rugby player
- Michel-Nicolas Balisson de Rougemont (1781–1840), a French writer

== Other uses ==
- Rougemont, later Bessemer, a GWR 3031 Class locomotive

== See also ==
- Rugemont Castle, in Ridgmont, Bedfordshire, England
- Mount Rouge, Graham Land, Antarctic Peninsula, Antarctica; a mountain
- Mont Rouge, Pennine Alps, Switzerland; a mountain
- Montrouge (disambiguation)
- Morne Rouge (disambiguation) (French: Rouge Hill, lit. 'Red Hill')
- Rouge (disambiguation)
