= Red House =

Red House or The Red House may refer to:

== Places and buildings ==
=== United Kingdom ===
- Red House, London (disambiguation), the name of several places
  - Red House, Bexleyheath, designed/owned by William Morris
- The Red House, Aldeburgh, home of Benjamin Britten and Peter Pears
- The Red House, Beverley, East Riding of Yorkshire
- Red House, Bournemouth, later called Langtry Manor
- Red House, Buntingford
- Red House Museum and Gardens, Christchurch, Dorset
- The Red House, in Red House Park, Great Barr, Sandwell
- The Red House, Hensall, North Yorkshire
- Red House, Moor Monkton, North Yorkshire
- Red House, Rotherham, later called Swinden House
- The Red House, part of the Great House at Sonning
- The Red House (York)
- Red House Museum, Gomersal, Yorkshire
- Red House School, Norton, Stockton-on-Tees
- Hylton Red House, or simply Red House, a suburb of Sunderland
  - Red House Academy

=== Isle of Man ===
- Red House, 1 The Parade, Castletown, a Registered Building of the Isle of Man
- The Red House, Victoria Road, Douglas, a Registered Building of the Isle of Man

=== United States ===
- Red House, New York, a town
- Red House (Upper West Side), a building
- Red House (South Kingstown, Rhode Island), a house
- Red House (Gay Hill, Washington County, Texas), listed on the National Register of Historic Places in Washington County, Texas
- Red House, Virginia, an unincorporated community
- Red House, West Virginia, an unincorporated community
- Red House Arts Center, in Syracuse, New York
- Red House hotel and sports grounds by Metropolitan Park (Manhattan)

=== Other places ===
- Red House (Guyana)
- Red House (Hong Kong)
- Red House (Solomon Islands)
- Red House (Trinidad and Tobago)
- Red House (Shanghai)
- Red House (Youghal), Ireland
- Red House Hospital, Shanghai, China
- Red House Theater, in Ximen, Taipei.
- Lodzia House, also known as Red House, Tel Aviv, Israel
- Red House, a museum in Monschau, Germany
- Bahay na Pula, or Red House, Bulacan, Philippines

== Arts and literature ==
- The Red House (film), a 1947 American horror film based on a 1943 George Agnew Chamberlain novel of the same title
- The Red House (Haddon novel), 2012, by Mark Haddon
- The Red House (Lambert novel), 1972, by Derek Lambert
- "Red House" (song), by Jimi Hendrix
- The Red House Mystery, a 1922 novel by A. A. Milne
- Red House, a 2004 memoir by Sarah Messer

== Other uses ==
- The Red House Report, purported plans for the post-war resurrection of Germany
- Red House Records, an American record label
- Red House eviction defense, a 2020–2021 protest in Portland, Oregon

== See also ==
- Redhouse (disambiguation)
- Maison Rouge (disambiguation)
