= Montrouge (disambiguation) =

Montrouge is a commune in the southern Parisian suburbs.

Montrouge may also refer to:

- Montrouge (actor) (1825–1903), born Louis Émile Hesnard, a French actor and theatre manager
- Marguerite Macé-Montrouge (1836–1898), a French actress
- Mont Rouge, a mountain of the Swiss Pennine Alps
- Mount Rouge, a mountain on the Antarctic Peninsula

== See also ==
- Rougemont (disambiguation)
