= Reclining Odalisque =

Photograph by Roger Fenton

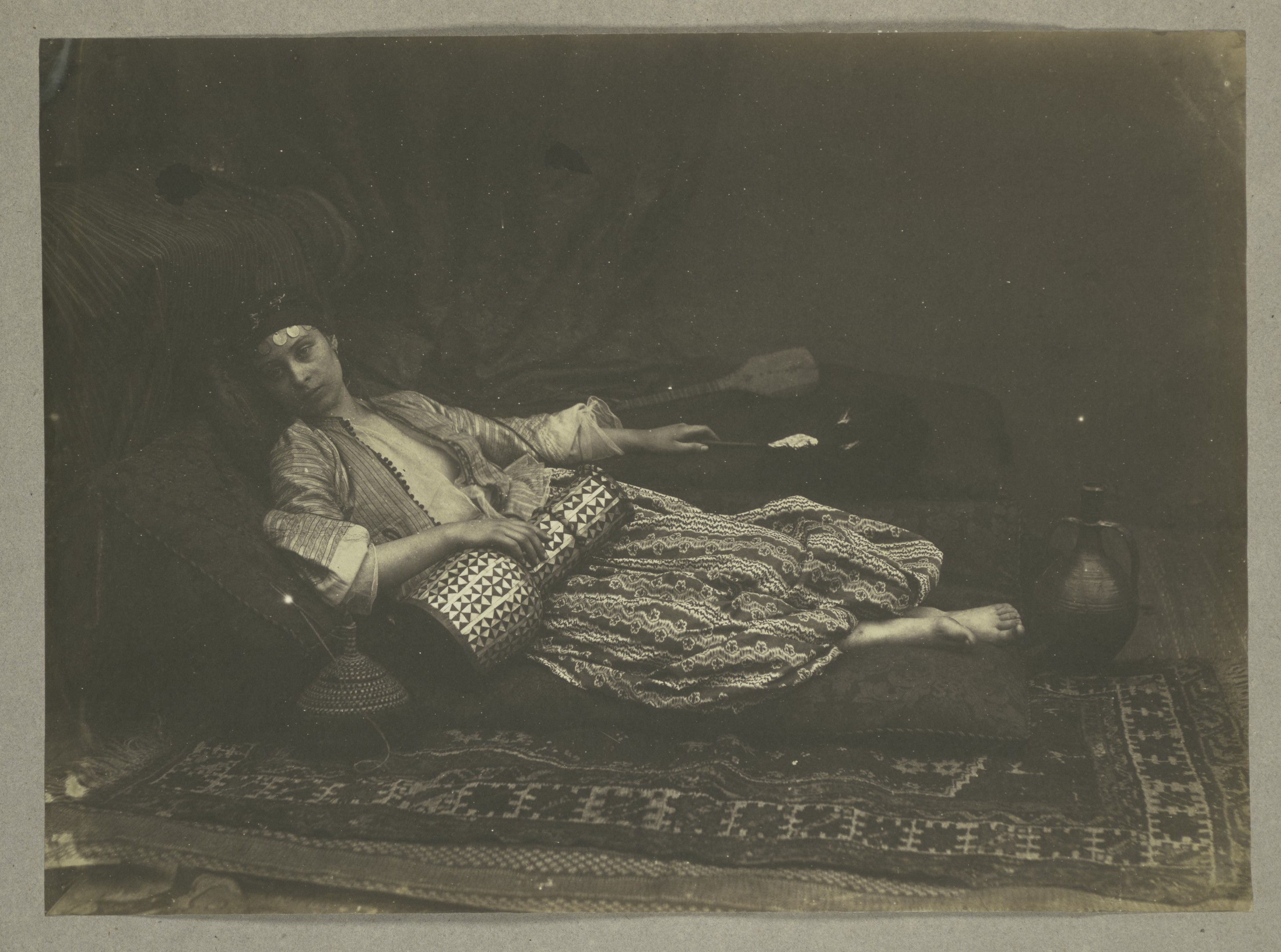
Reclining Odalisque (1858) by Roger Fenton

Reclining Odalisque is a black and white photograph taken by English photographer Roger Fenton, in 1858. It is a staged photograph, part of the series that the artist dedicated to the recreation of exotic inspired scenes of the Middle East. Gordon Baldwin considers this "one of the very best of his Orientalist pictures, transcending the limits of the genre to produce a touching and vulnerable portrait of the woman".

== History and description ==
Fenton created around 50 photographs in the Summer of 1858, inspired by the exoticism of the Middle East and the orientalist artistic movement. These pictures were all staged in his studio in London. Fenton took inspiration in the depiction of odalisques and scenes from harems, from the Ottoman Empire and the Islamic world, as seen in the paintings of artists like Jean-Auguste-Dominique Ingres and Eugène Delacroix, and also possibly in the pictures recently taken by French pioneer photographer Félix-Jacques Moulin, in his trip to Algeria, in 1856, for staged pictures like this. Other photographers at the time, also inspired by orientalism, took a similar approach to Fenton.

A model, in a dark setting, portrays the odalisque, who lies in several pillows, set upon oriental carpets. She is dressed in a Turkish inspired exotic manner, wearing an unbuttoned blouse, that allows a glimpse of one of her breasts, and harem-style pants, while she is barefoot. She wears a crown of golden coins and holds a Middle-Eastern goblet drum named ''darbukka''. Her look appears melancholic.

== Reception ==
The Metropolitan Museum of Art website states that "The odalisque is simply there, a vision floating in darkness: the exquisite embodiment of Victorian fascination with the exotic and the erotic."

Gordon Baldwin compared this picture with a similar depiction by Moulin, taken in Algeria, probably in 1856: "Although Fenton's model is also barefooted, she is languorously stretched out alone on her divan, one arm draped lazily over a table drum, the other along the couch. The drum, a darabukke, that rests across her lap is hardly a barrier, but the significant sexual content here rests elsewhere, in the filmy blouse that partly bares one breast and in the dreamy vulnerability of her face, turned appealingly to the viewer, who has interrupted her reverie."

== Public collections ==
The only known print of the photograph is at the Metropolitan Museum of Art, in New York. It was purchased at Christie’s in 1978 by £5,400.
