= Morne Rouge =

Morne Rouge or Morne-Rouge (French: Rouge Hill, lit. 'Red Hill') may refer to:

- Morne Rouge, Grenada, a town in Saint George Parish, Grenada
- Morne-Rouge, Martinique, a commune in the French overseas department of Martinique
- Morne Rouge, Saint Barthélemy, a quartier of Saint Barthélemy (named after the mountain of the same name)
- Morne Rouge Plantation, historic home of NC Governor Montfort Stokes

== See also ==
- Morne (disambiguation)
- Rouge (disambiguation)
- Rougemont (disambiguation) and Rougemount (Redmount/Redmont)
