= Company Path Garden =

Garden in Georgetown, Guyana

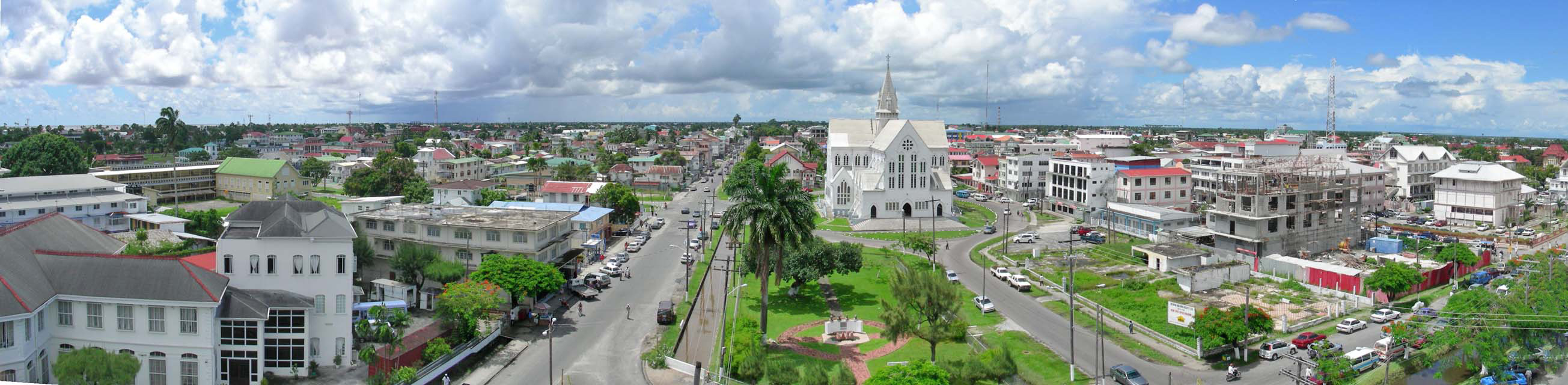
- Company Path Garden in front of the Cathedral
- Type: Urban park
- Location: Stabroek, Georgetown, Guyana
- Coordinates: 6.81260°N 58.16256°W
- Created: 1908

Company Path Garden is a small garden on the west side of the Avenue of the Republic in Georgetown, Guyana, between Church and North Streets.

In 1907, the entrance to the St. George's Cathedral, combined with the Company Path, was transferred to the Georgetown Town Council by the Government. It was turned into a garden the next year.

== Non-aligned Monument ==
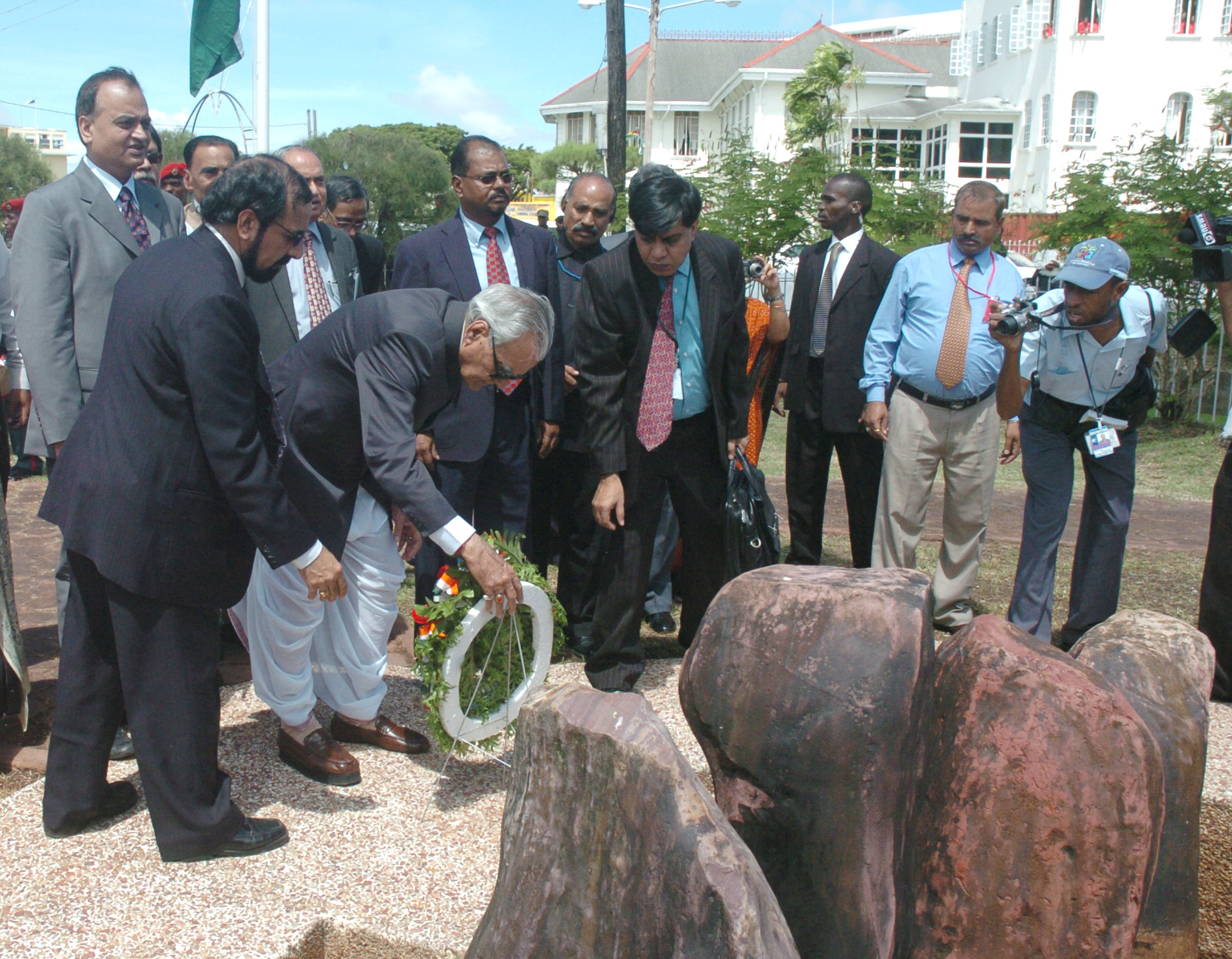
Indian Vice-president Bhairon Singh Shekhawat laying a wreath at the monument (2016)

The Non-aligned Monument was placed in the garden during the 1972 Non-Aligned Foreign Ministers Conference in Georgetown. The monument contains the busts of Presidents Gamal Abdel Nasser (Egypt), Kwame Nkrumah (Ghana), Jawaharlal Nehru (India), and Josip Broz Tito (Yugoslavia) who founded the Non-Aligned Movement for states that are not formally aligned with the major powers.

The monument was revealed by President Arthur Chung. The busts were sculpted in the countries of origin, and have been complemented by four quartz stones from the Orinduik Falls. The Non-aligned Monument is one of the nine national monuments of Guyana.
