= Cap-Rouge =

Cap-Rouge (French: Cape Rouge, lit. 'Red Cape') can refer to:

- Cap-Rouge, Quebec City, a borough in Quebec City
- Cap-Rouge, Nova Scotia
- Cap-Rouge trestle, a bridge in the borough in Quebec City
- Rivière du Cap Rouge, a river that passes through Quebec City

== See also ==
- Rouge (disambiguation)
- Cap (disambiguation)
