= 1972 Non-Aligned Foreign Ministers Conference =

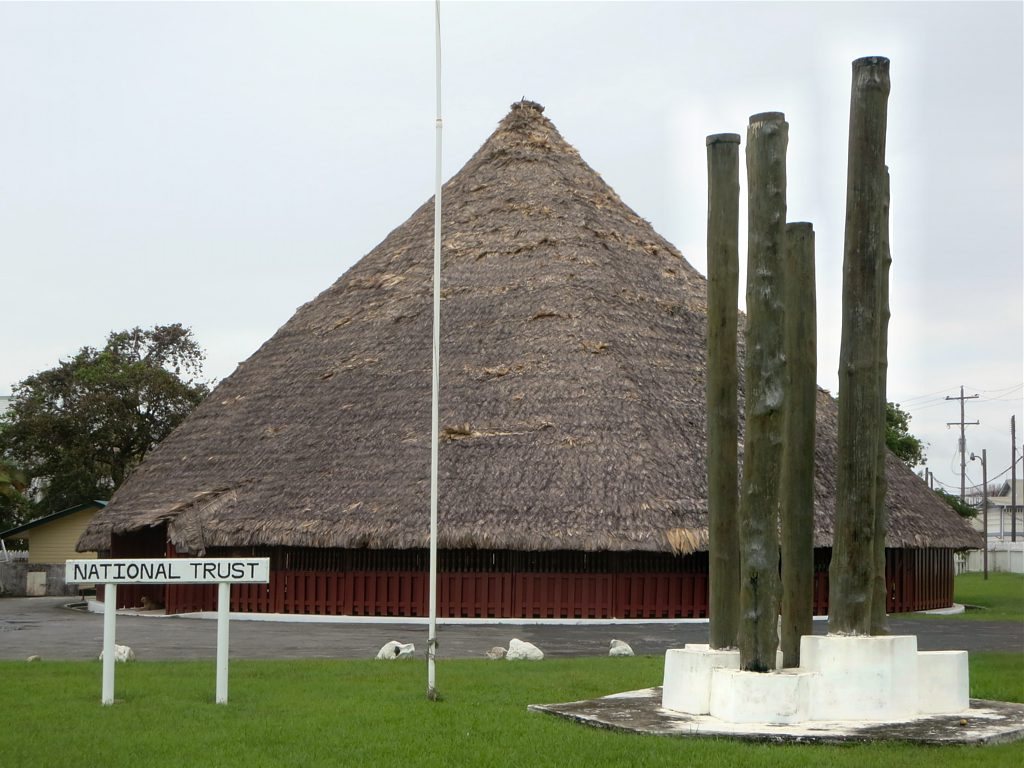
- Umana Yana, V.I.P. lounge for the conference
- Host country: Guyana
- Date: 8 August 1972 – 12 August 1972
- Cities: Georgetown, Guyana
- Venues: Pegasus Hotel
- Follows: first foreign ministers conference
- Precedes: 1975 Non-Aligned Foreign Ministers Conference (Lima, Peru)

The Non-Aligned Foreign Ministers Conference was held in Georgetown, Guyana from 8 August to 12 August 1972.

It was attended by delegations from 59 Non-Aligned Movement member countries, 12 delegations of observers and 8 guests. The Royal Government of National Union of Kampuchea was recognized as the legitimate representative of Cambodia (then ruled by the US-backed Khmer Republic); and the Provisional Revolutionary Government of the Republic of South Vietnam was admitted as a full member (southern Vietnam was then ruled by the US-backed Republic of Vietnam). Delegates from Indonesia, Malaysia, and the Kingdom of Laos staged a protest walk-out to convey dissatisfaction with this decision.

China's renewed interest in the movement was tied to the growing need for support against the USSR and returning the favor after admission to the United Nations, with votes mostly coming from non-aligned nations.

The conference adopted an Action Programme for Economic Co-operation called the "Georgetown Declaration". The meeting included a call for a resolution in the Middle East and the withdrawal of Israel from Arab territories. Also, a proposal was endorsed for a meeting of non-aligned ministers prior to any United Nations General Assembly meetings in order to "coordinate their positions" as well as establish annual meetings of heads of state.

The Umana Yana ("meeting place of the people" in the local Waiwai language), a conical palm hut (benab), was erected as a V.I.P. lounge and recreation centre.

== Commemorative statue ==
During the conference, the Non-aligned Monument to the four founders of the Non-Aligned Movement - President Nasser of Egypt, President Kwame Nkrumah of Ghana, Jawaharlal Nehru of India and President Josip Broz Tito of Yugoslavia - was erected in Company Path Garden and was unveiled by the then President, Arthur Chung. Each bust was sculpted in that founder's country, and the quartz base from the Mazaruni area, and decorated with jasper from Orinduik Falls.
