= Moulin (surname) =

Moulin and du Moulin are French-language surnames. "Moulin" literally means "mill".

The surname may refer to:

- Arthur Moulin (1924–2017), French politician
- Chris Moulin, English psychologist
- Félix-Jacques Moulin (1802–1875), French photographer
- Ginette Moulin (1927–2025), French businesswoman
- Henry du Moulin de Labarthète (1900–1948), French senior civil servant and diplomat
- Hervé Moulin (born 1950), French economist
- Hippolyte Moulin (1832–1884), French sculptor
- Jean Moulin (1899–1943), member of the French Resistance during World War II
- Jean-François-Auguste Moulin (1752–1810), French military officer and political leader
- Jeanine Moulin (1912–1998), Belgian poet
- Jessy Moulin (born 1986), French football player
- Laure Moulin (1892–1974), French resistant and teacher
- Lewis Du Moulin, French Huguenot physician and controversialist, son of Pierre
- Marc Moulin (1942–2008), Belgian musician
- Marjatta Moulin (1926–2018), Finnish fencer
- Peter du Moulin, French-English Anglican clergyman and author, son of Pierre
- Peter Ludwig du Moulin, (1681–1756), Prussian general
- Pierre Moulin, French historian
- Pierre Du Moulin (1568–1658), Huguenot minister and author in France
- Pierre Moulin du Coudray de La Blanchère (1821–1880), French photographer
- Stéphane Moulin (born 1967), French football player
- Thibault Moulin (born 1990), French football player

== See also ==
- Moulins (disambiguation)
