= Kingston, Guyana =

Kingston
- Ward
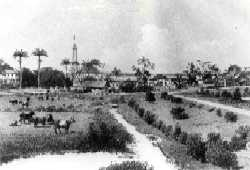
- Kingston in the 19th century

- Location within Guyana
- Coordinates: 6.82315°N 58.16239°W
- Country: Guyana
- City: Georgetown

Population (2012)
  - Total: 971

Kingston is a former village in Demerara. In 1837, it became a ward of Georgetown. The ward is located along the Atlantic Ocean coast. Kingston is home to many landmarks and historic buildings.

== History ==
Around 1759, Cornelius Leary applied for land, and established a coffee and cotton plantation near the mouth of the Demerara River. Eve Leary, his wife, later inherited the plantation. In 1796, the Dutch colony of Demerara was captured from by the British. English officers started to build cottages and gardens near Eve Leary's estate. In 1837, the village was annexed by Georgetown. Many of the elite of Georgetown started to construct residences in Kingston.

The origin of the name is disputed. Some historians claim that it relates to Lieutenant Robert Kingston who built the fort at Georgetown while others say it was named after King George III.

Kingston was prone to frequent flooding giving its vicinity to the Atlantic Ocean. In 1892, the Georgetown Sea Wall was constructed to protect Georgetown.

Many historic buildings and landmarks have been constructed in the Kingston ward. It is also home to many embassies. The ward contains two large hotels: The Pegasus, and the Marriott. The St. Joseph Mercy Hospital, a Catholic non-profit hospital, and the headquarters of the Guyana Police Force are located in Kingston.

The Kingston West area has the second highest concentration of Government Offices after Brickdam, Stabroek. The Ministries of Public Works (Head Office), Local Government & Regional Development (Head Office), Health (Junior Nursing School & Central Bond), Education (National Centre for Educational Research & Development), Natural Resources (Guyana Forestry Commission), the Guyana Power & Light (Wartsilia Power Plant), Guyana Elections Commission (Secretariat, Annex & CEO's Office), Public/Police Service Commission & the Court of Appeals are all located within this block. The Cuban Embassy, Inter-American Development Bank, US Peace Corps and the official residence of the Anglican Bishop (Austin House) are also located in this area. National landmarks include the Georgetown Light House and the Umana Yana.

In November 2021, it was announced that area around the Sea Wall will be redeveloped into a tourist hub as part of the National Beautification Project by First Lady Arya Ali.

== Sights ==
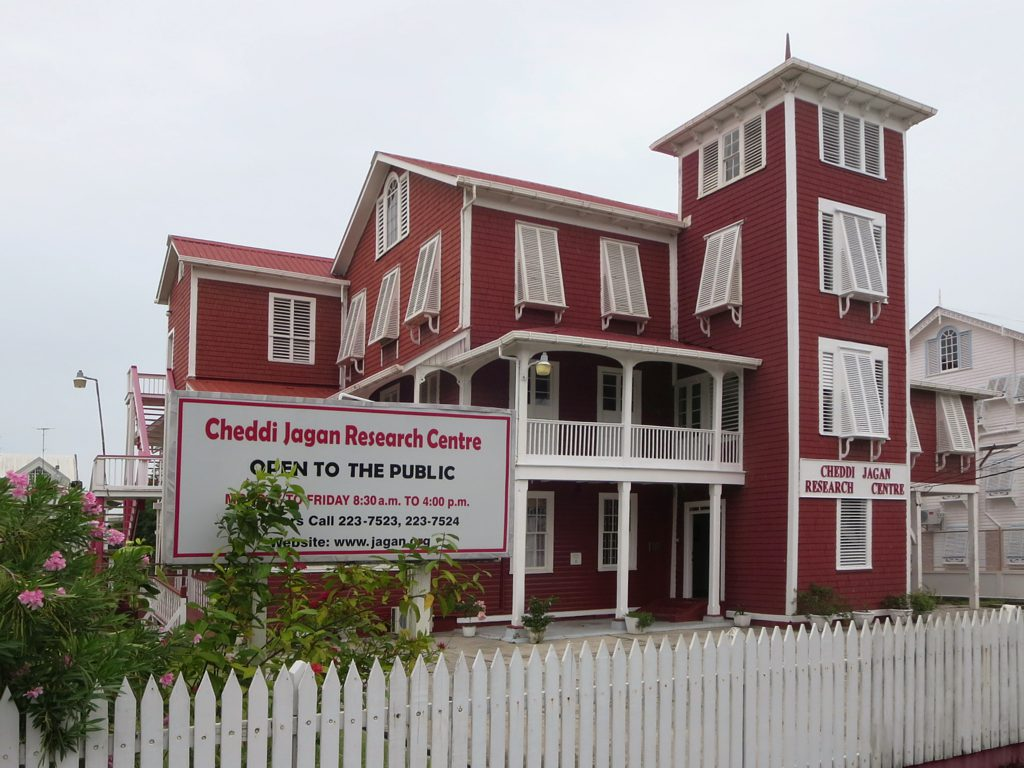
The Red House

The main sights in Kingston are:

- Umana Yana and the African Liberation Monument, a benab (conical palm hut) erected for the Non-Aligned Foreign Ministers Conference.
- Red House, the former official residence of the Premier of British Guiana. Nowadays, it houses the Cheddi Jagan Research Centre.
- Georgetown Lighthouse.
- Georgetown Seawall Bandstand.
- Immigration Agent General Office, the headquarters for administrating the Indian indentured servants. The building is nowadays used by the National Centre for Education Resource Development.
- Austin House, the Anglican Bishop's residence.
- "We, the First People", a mural painted on the walls of the Canadian High Commission.

== Major Divisions ==
=== North to South ===
Water Street

Fort Street

High Street

Duke Street

Parade Street

=== East to West ===
Battery Road

Young Street

Barrack Street

Cowan Street

=== Sub Districts ===
Kingston West: bordered by Battery Road to the North, Cowan street to the South, High street to the East and Water street to the West.

Kingston East
