= 1975 Non-Aligned Foreign Ministers Conference =

- Host country: Peru
- Date: 25–30 August 1975
- Cities: Lima
- Chair: Miguel Ángel de la Flor

1975 Non-Aligned Foreign Ministers Conference was held in Lima, Peru in between 25 and 30 August. Non-Aligned Movement member countries agreed to establish the Solidarity Fund for Economic and Social Development as well as the Special Fund for Financing of Buffer Stocks of Raw Materials and Primary Products Exported by Developing Countries.

The foreign ministers congratulated the North Vietnamese on victory in the Vietnam War, condemned the United States for what they called sabotaging of Kampuchea's independence, and welcomed the dissolution of the Southeast Asia Treaty Organization. In addition to events in Southeast Asia, the meeting also addressed the Israeli–Palestinian conflict.

The meeting introduced the formal decision to accept the Tanjug proposal from January 1975 on the establishment of the Non-Aligned News Agencies Pool. North Korea was admitted as the newest member state of the movement. In an effort to establish closer relations with non-aligned countries, the Australian Prime Minister Gough Whitlam authorised Australia to participate in the event as a guest country.

== See also ==
- Foreign relations of Peru
