= Red House (Guyana) =

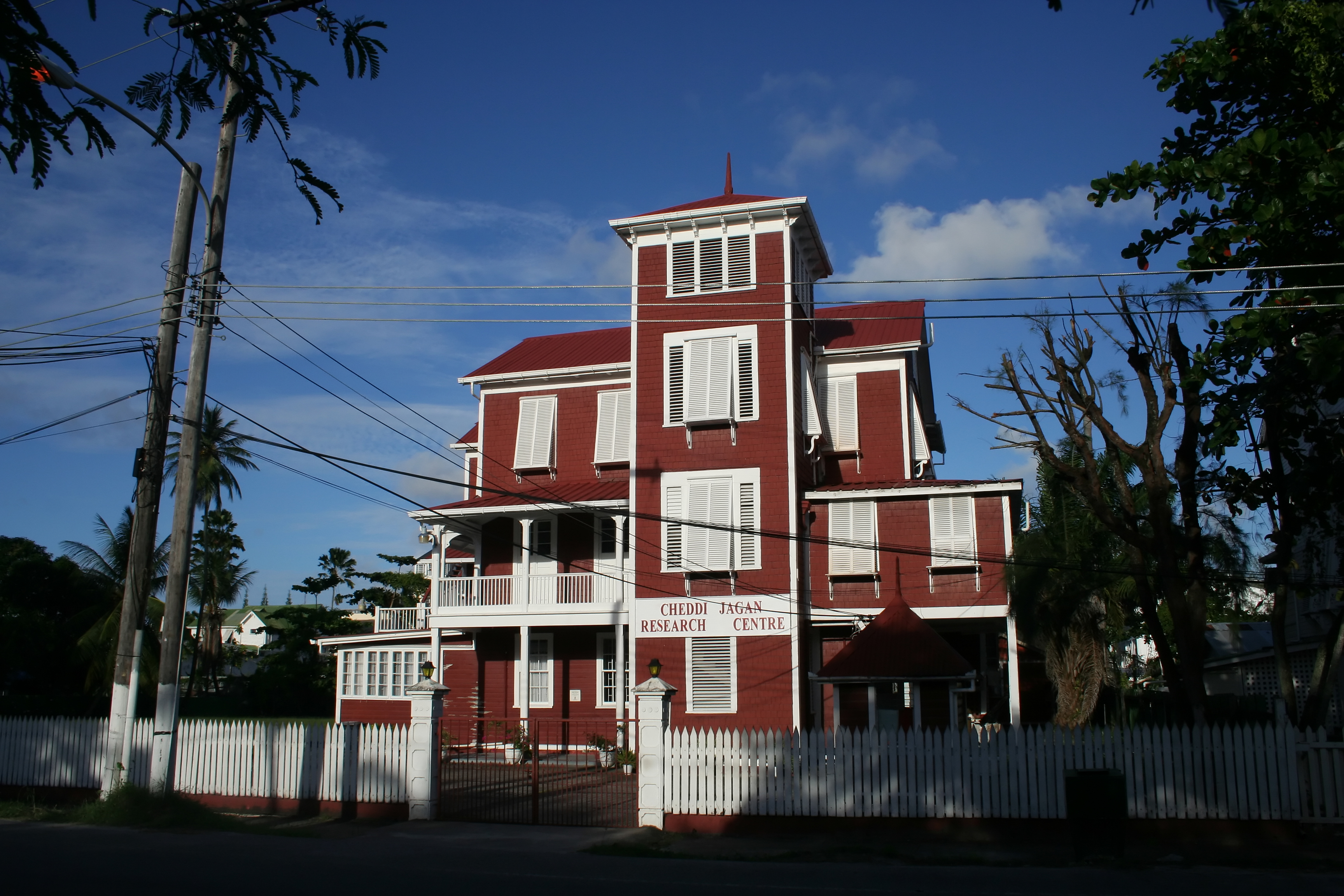
- Red House (2007)

- Location within Guyana

General information
- Location: Highstreet, Kingston, Georgetown, Guyana
- Coordinates: 6.82264°N 58.16261°W

Technical details
- Material: Wood

Red House (also: Kamana Court) located in Kingston, Georgetown, was the official residence of the Colonial Secretary and later the Premier of British Guiana. As of 22 March 2000, it houses the Cheddi Jagan Research Centre.

== History ==
The Red House is a wooden colonial building from the 19th century. In the early 20th century, the building was owned by Eustace Woolford, a former Speaker of the Legislative Assembly. In 1925, the building was acquired by the government of British Guiana to serve as official residence of the Colonial Secretary.

In 1961, the Red House became the official residence for Cheddi Jagan, the first Premier of British Guiana. Forbes Burnham was elected in 1964 and changed the official residence to Castellani House. From 1964 onwards, the Red House was used by various governmental agencies. In 1972, the Non-Aligned Conference was held in Georgetown, and the Red House was renamed Kamana Court. The building was declared a national monument of Guyana.

== Cheddi Jagan Research Centre ==
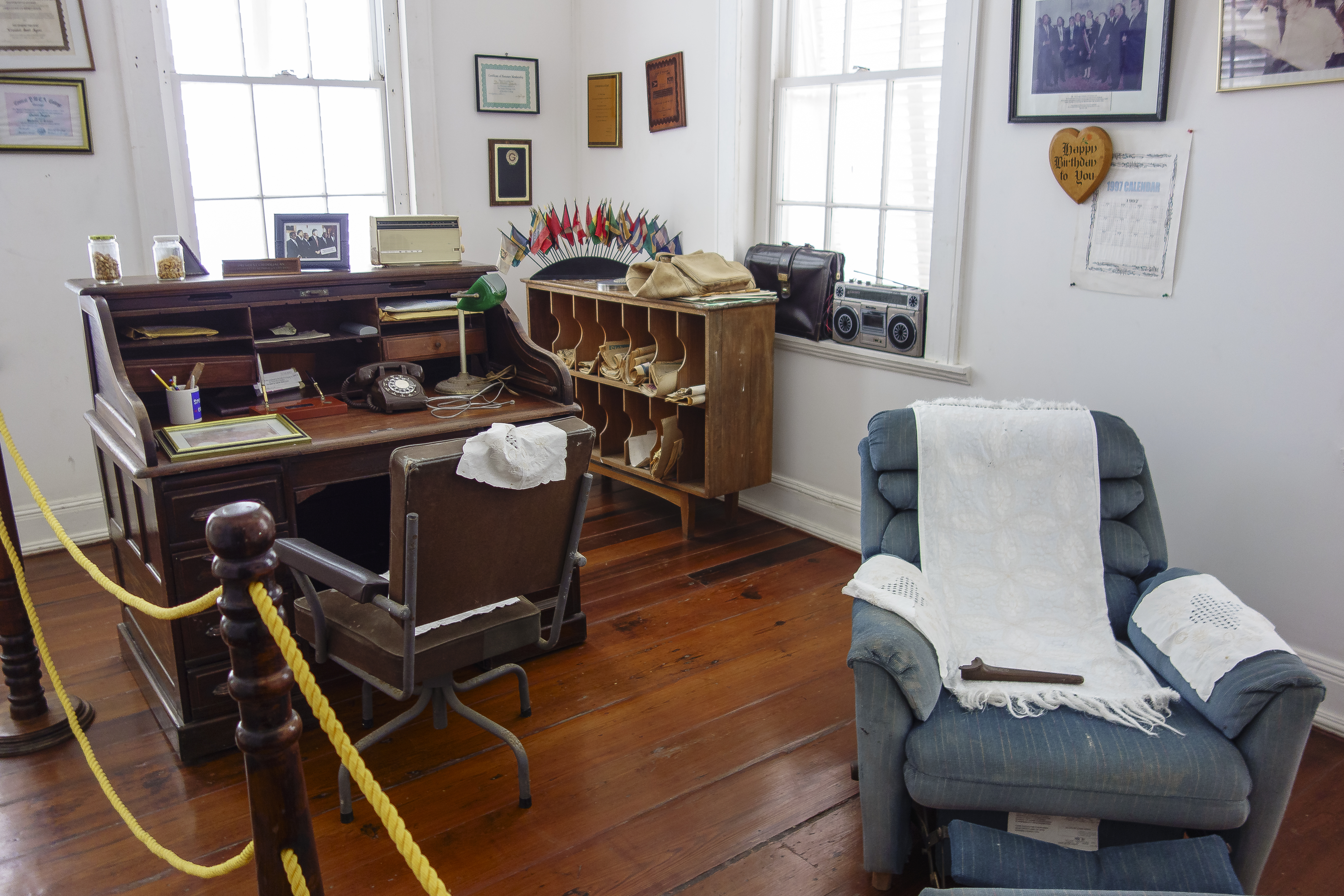
Jagan's Office

On 22 March 2000, the Cheddi Jagan Research Centre, a centre dedicated to the life and work of Cheddi Jagan, opened in the Red House. The centre is operated by friends and family of Jagan who had signed a 99-year lease on the building. On 29 December 2016, the lease was revoked by President David A. Granger who had planned to move the National Trust of Guyana into the building. The centre took the matter to the courts who ruled on 16 August 2020 that Granger's revocation was illegal and unlawful, and that the centre could retain the lease.

== See also ==
- 1972 Non-Aligned Foreign Ministers Conference
