= The Psyche Mirror =

Painting by Berthe Morisot

The Psyché Mirror
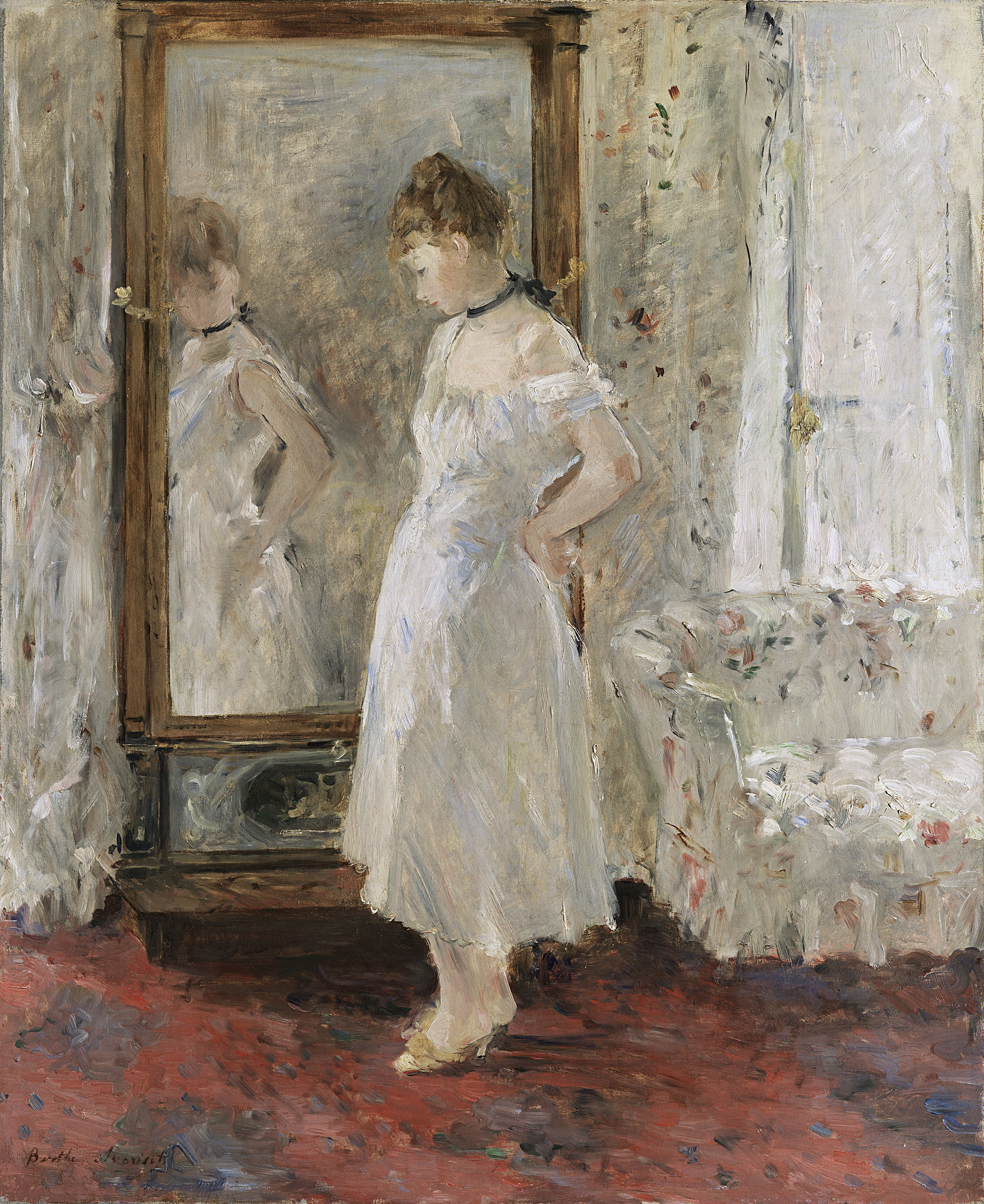
- Artist: Berthe Morisot
- Year: 1876
- Medium: Oil on canvas
- Dimensions: 65 cm × 54 cm (26 in × 21 in)
- Location: Thyssen-Bornemisza Museum; Madrid

The Psyche Mirror, original French title La Psyché, is an oil-on-canvas painting by the French artist Berthe Morisot, created in 1876. The painting links the theme of a woman making her toilet with the mythical motif of Psyche. The work is held in the Thyssen-Bornemisza Museum, in Madrid.

== History ==
Women in their toilets were often the subject of Morisot's paintings. Four of the eight paintings that she made in 1876 depicted that theme, including The Psyche Mirror. She exhibited the work, together with Young Woman Powdering Her Face (1876), at the third Impressionist exhibition, in 1877. The second painting was purchased during the exhibition by the collector and patron Ernest Hoschedé. When it was later auctioned, American painter Mary Cassatt, who felt a strong affinity with Morisot's themes and style, bought it.

== Description ==
Morisot's The Psyche Mirror shows a young woman looking at herself in a large psyche mirror. It appears in the painting placed between two windows, while the whole scene is bathed in light. The young woman is completely absorbed in her own contemplation. She seems to be undressing, undoing a fastener at the back of her corset, and one sleeve is already slipping over her shoulder.

As always, Morisot applies the brushstrokes very loosely. Stripes and specks draw the pattern of the floor covering. Attributes, such as the mirror and the sofa on the right, are out of focus. The large mirror with the high frame, which is cut through the top of the painting, gives the impression of a painting within a painting, also in a vagueness reminiscent of Edgar Degas's depictions of ballerinas.

== Analysis ==
At first sight, the connection between Morisot's painting and the Greek myth of Psyche seems to be far-fetched. The woman depicted does not really come across as someone from the Greek mythology. There is no trace of her beloved Amor either. Nevertheless, at the time when Morisot made this work, the current image was closely associated with her maker. Morisot had married Eugène Manet, younger brother of the painter Édouard Manet, in 1874. She had just entered a new phase in her life, where she would try to reconcile her existence as a wife and later as a mother with being an artist, which would cost her a lot of effort.

As in so many of her works, Morisot tries to touch the deeper female 'psyche' in her work. She believed that female artists were better able to do this than men. In 1890 she wrote in her diary: "The truth is that our strength lies in the feeling, in intuition, in our gaze, which is more delicate than men's. We can calculate anything, as long as we don't spoil everything with clumsiness, pedantry, and sentimentality. I would like to continue working until I die. I wish others wouldn't give me such a hard time."

Art historian Whitney Chadwick wrote of Psyche in 1990: "Paintings like this normally appeal to the conventional association between women and mirrors and to the notion that vanity is 'proper' to them. Morisot's painting, on the other hand, can be regarded as a daring emancipatory and sympathetic portrayal of female self-awareness and emerging female sexuality for the time."

According to Wu Hung, Morisot boldly used the "woman in front of a mirror" template but dropped the voyeuristic approach and replaced it with female subjectivity.

== Sources ==
- Hung, W. (2023). The Full-Length Mirror: A Global Visual History. Reaktion Books. ISBN 978-1-78914-610-3.
