= Umana Yana =

Conical thatched hut in Georgetown, Guyana

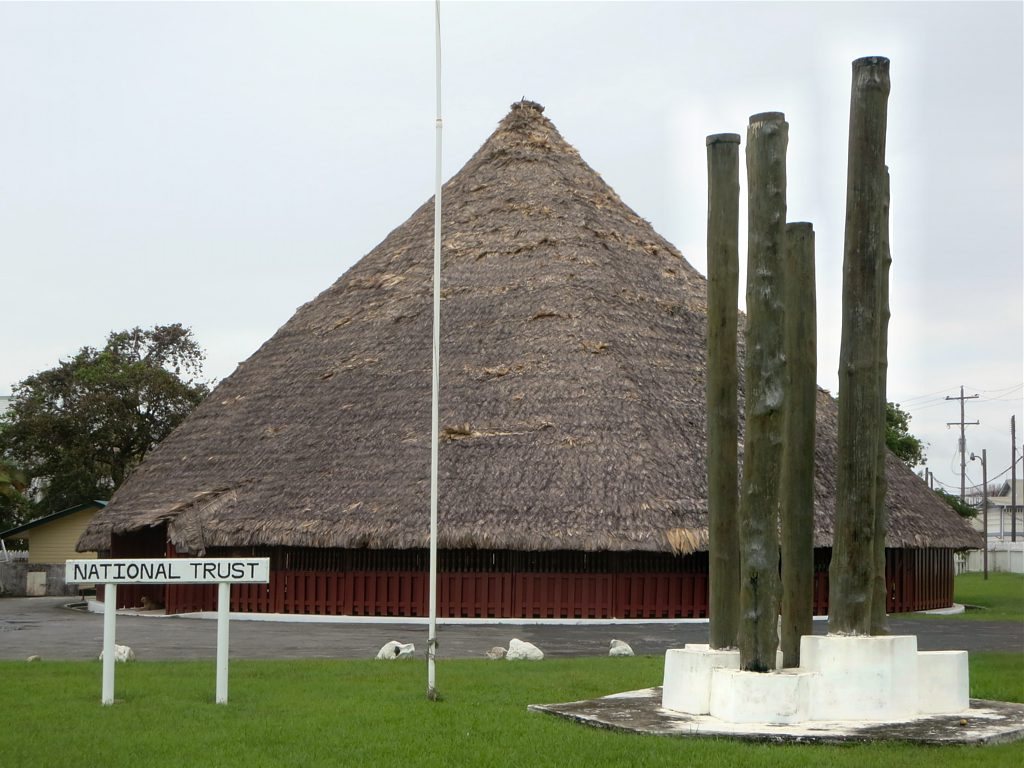
- Umana Yana with the African Liberation Monument on the right

- Location within Guyana

General information
- Type: Exhibition and conference centre
- Architectural style: Amerindian
- Location: Kingston, Georgetown, Guyana
- Coordinates: 6.824448°N 58.162576°W
- Completed: 1972

The Umana Yana (pronounced oo-man-a yan-na) is a conical palm thatched hut (benab) erected for the Non-Aligned Foreign Ministers Conference in Georgetown, Guyana in August 1972 as a V.I.P. lounge and recreation centre.

== History ==
The Umana Yana, was first erected in 1972. It was designed by Guyanese architect, Mr. George Henry and was built on the site of the old Mariners’ Club. It is located on High Street, Kingston, Georgetown. The word Umana Yana is an Indigenous term used by the Wai Wai people to describe the huge benabs they usually congregate in as a meeting place. "Umana Yana" is a Wai-Wai word meaning "Meeting place of the people".

It is located next to the Le Meridien Pegasus Hotel, it is now a permanent and much admired part of Georgetown's scenery, and is in constant use as an exhibition and conference centre.

The structure is 17 metres (55 ft) high and is made from thatched allibanna and manicole palm leaves, and wallaba posts lashed together with mukru, turu and nibbi vines. No nails were used. It was erected by a team of about sixty Wai-Wai Amerindians, one of the nine indigenous tribes of Guyana. Fashioned like the Wai-Wai benabs or shelters which are found deep in Guyana's interior, it occupies an area of 460 square metres, making it the largest structure of its kind in Guyana.

On 7 April 2001, the Umana Yana, along with the African Liberation Monument, was gazetted as one of Guyana's National Monuments.

Renovated in 2010, on 9 September 2014, the Umana Yana was gutted by fire and destroyed. The government planned to rebuild the national landmark as soon as possible, with better ventilation and to correct electrical issues which are suspected in the earlier fire. Rebuilding started in late 2015 and was completed in 2016.

== African Liberation Monument ==
On 26 August 1974, President Forbes Burnham unveiled the African Liberation Monument outside the benab "in memory of all of those who have struggled and continue to struggle for freedom from Human Bondage". The monument consists of five polished Greenheart logs encased in a jasper stand on a granite boulder.
