= Moulin Rouge (disambiguation) =

Moulin Rouge (French, 'Red Mill') is a famous Paris cabaret.

Moulin Rouge may also refer to:

== Arts, entertainment and media ==
=== Film ===
- Moulin Rouge (1928 film), a British silent film directed by Ewald André Dupont
- Moulin Rouge (1934 film), an American film directed by Sidney Lanfield
- Moulin Rouge (1941 film), a French film directed by André Hugon and Yves Mirande
- Moulin Rouge (1952 film), a British film directed by John Huston
- Moulin Rouge!, 2001 film directed by Baz Luhrmann

=== Music ===
- Moulin Rouge (band), a Slovenian popular music group
- "It's April Again", also known as "The Song from Moulin Rouge" or "Moulin Rouge" or "Where Is Your Heart", from the 1952 film Moulin Rouge
- "Moulin Rouge", song by Jay Chou from the 2006 album Still Fantasy
- Moulin Rouge! Music from Baz Luhrmann's Film, soundtrack to the 2001 film
- Moulin Rouge! Music from Baz Luhrmann's Film, Vol. 2, volume two of the soundtrack of the 2001 film

=== Other uses in arts, entertainment and media ===
- Moulin Rouge! (musical), 2018 musical
- Moulin rouge (magazine), a Russian magazine
- Moulin Rouge, a novel by Pierre La Mure and the basis for the 1952 film
- At the Moulin Rouge, a painting by Henri de Toulouse-Lautrec

== Other uses ==
- Moulin Rouge Hotel, a hotel in Las Vegas, Nevada, US
- Moulin Rouge Cinema, a movie theater in Tehran, Iran

== See also ==
- Rouge (disambiguation)
- Moulin (disambiguation)
