= Fort Rouge =

Fort Rouge (French for 'Red Fort') can refer to:

- Fort Rouge (fortification), a fortification built on the Assiniboine River near the Forks
- Fort Rouge, Winnipeg, a city neighborhood in Winnipeg, Manitoba, Canada
- Fort Rouge (electoral district), a provincial electoral district in Manitoba
- Agra Fort, a walled palatial city in India also known as the "Red Fort"

== See also ==
- Fort (disambiguation)
- Rouge (disambiguation)
