= Redhouse (surname) =

Redhouse is a surname. Notable people with the surname include:

- Diana Redhouse (1923–2007), British artist
- Harry Redhouse (1880–1959), English cricketer
- James Redhouse (1811–1892), British lexicographer

== See also ==
- Andrew Hamilton, Lord Redhouse (c. 1565–1634), Scottish landowner
