= Rouging =

Rouging is a form of corrosion found in stainless steel. It can be due to iron contamination of the stainless steel surface due to welding of non-stainless steel for support columns, or other temporary means, which when welded off leaves a low chromium area.

There are three classes of rouging: Class I, Class II, and Class III.

Class I – stainless steel surface and the Cr/Fe ratio of the metal surface beneath such deposits usually remain unaltered.
Class II – Iron particles originating in-situ on unpassivated or improperly passivated stainless steel surfaces. By their formation the Cr/Fe ratio of the metal surface is altered.
Class III – Iron oxide (or scale) which forms on surfaces in high temperature steam systems. The Cr/Fe ratio of the protective film is usually altered.
