= Hostius Quadra =

Hostius Quadra was a Roman slave-owner famed for his sexual licentiousness. He was murdered by his own slaves, supposedly on account of his sexual appetites.

== Life ==
Hostius Quadra lived during the reign of the emperor Augustus. ″The profligate nature of Hostius Quadra's sexual enthusiasm was such that it led to his murder at the hands of his disgusted slaves.″

== References in Seneca's Naturales Quaestiones ==
Hostius Quadra is known through references made by Seneca in his Naturales quaestiones.

Hostius fuit Quadra, obscenitatis in scaenam usque productae. Hunc diuitem auarum, sestertii milies seruum, diuus Augustus indignum uindicta iudicauit, cum a seruis occisus esset, et tantum non pronuntiauit iure caesum videri. Non erat ille ab uno tantummodo sexu impurus, sed tam uirorum quam feminarum auidus fuit, fecitque specula huius notae, cuius modo rettuli, imagines longe maiores reddentia, in quibus digitus brachii mensuram et crassitudinem excederet. Haec autem ita disponebat, ut cum uirum ipse pateretur, auersus omnes admissarii sui motus in speculo uideret ac deinde falsa magnitudine ipsius membri tamquam uera gaudebat.

There was one Hostius Quadra whose obscenity formed a model for everything that was lewd on the stage. He was rich and avaricious, a very slave to his millions. He was eventually murdered by his own slaves, but the late Emperor Augustus considered his murder undeserving of punishment, and as good as declared that he had been justly slain. This man's lust knew no distinction of sex. Among other things, he had mirrors constructed of the kind just mentioned, that reflected images of abnormal size, causing, for example, a finger to exceed the size of an arm in length and thickness. He so arranged his mirrors that he could see all his accomplice's movements, and could gloat over the imagined proportions of his own body.

== References in Robert Burton's The Anatomy of Melancholy ==
The author and scholar Robert Burton, writing in early-modern England, further speculates in The Anatomy of Melancholy that,

Hostius quidam specula fecit, & ita disposuit, ut quum virum ipse pateretur, aversus omnes admissarii motus in speculo videret, ac deinde falsa magnitudine ipsius membri tanquam vera gauderet, simul virum & foeminam passus, quod diuctu foedum & abominandum.

Someone called Hostius constructed a magnifying mirror and arranged it in such a way that, when he was submitting to another man's lust, he could see all the movement of his stallion behind in the mirror, and then he would delight in the deceptive size of his partner's member as if it was real, and in prostituting himself to a man and a woman at the same time — which is horrible and detestable to mention.
