= Maison Rouge =

Maison Rouge (French, 'Red House') may refer to:

- Maison-Rouge, a commune in France
- La Maison Rouge, an art gallery in Paris, France
- Maison Rouge, the home of pirate Jean Lafitte in Galveston, Texas, U.S.

== See also ==
- Red House (disambiguation)
- Maison (disambiguation)
- Rouge (disambiguation)
