= Morne Rouge, Saint Barthélemy =

Morne Rouge
- Quartier
- The quartier of Morne Rouge, Saint Barthélemy marked 25.
- Coordinates: 17°53′1″N 62°48′41″W
- Country: France
- Overseas collectivity: Saint Barthélemy

Morne Rouge (French pronunciation: [mɔʁn ʁuʒ]) is a quartier of Saint Barthélemy in the Caribbean. It is located in the southern part of the island.
