= Georgetown Seawall Bandstand =

Coordinates: 6.825193°N 58.158931°W

The Georgetown Seawall Bandstand is an iron bandstand that is situated on the western end of Georgetown Seawall in Guyana. It is one of three bandstands in Georgetown, the other two being situated in the Botanical Gardens and the Promenade Gardens.

== History ==
The Georgetown Seawall Bandstand was built in 1903 with public funds as a memorial to Queen Victoria. It was commissioned by Sir James Alexander Swettenham (1846-1933), who was at that time the Governor of British Guiana. During the colonial era, the bandstand was used for performances by the British Guiana Militia Band. The shelter that is situated to the north of the bandstand, called the Koh-i-noor Shelter, was also built in 1903.

In 2010, the bandstand was adopted by the Guyana Police Force.
