= Les amours de Psyché et de Cupidon =

French retelling of Cupid and Psyche

The Loves of Cupid and Psyche
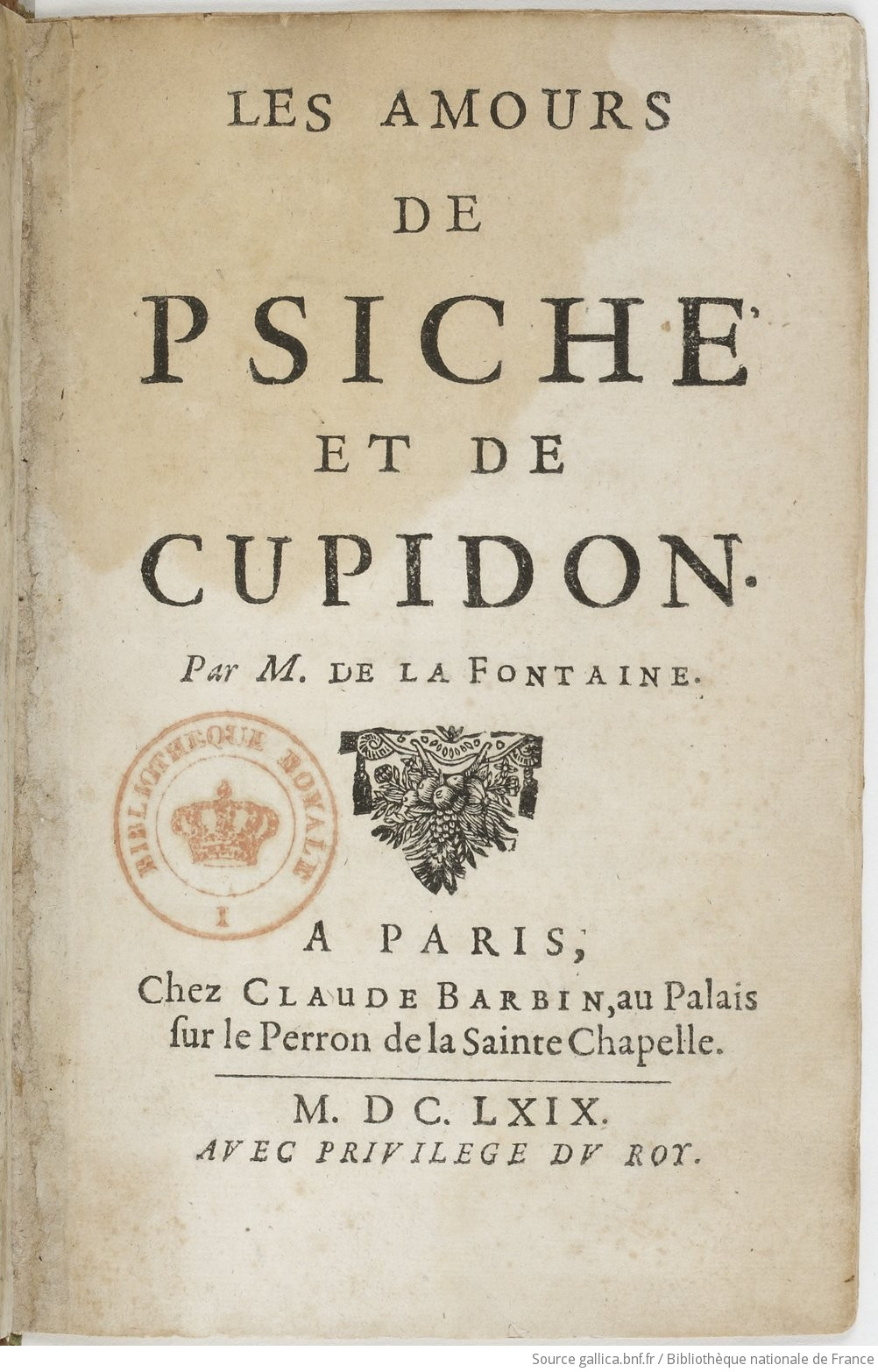
- Frontispiece of the first edition (1669)
- Author: Jean de La Fontaine
- Original title: Les Amours de Psiché et de Cupidon
- Language: French
- Subject: Cupid and Psyche
- Genre: Prosimetrum, novella
- Published: 1669
- Publisher: Claude Barbin
- Pages: c. 140 (Pléiade edition)

Les amours de Psyché et de Cupidon (The Loves of Psyche and Cupid) is a 1669 retelling of the ancient story of Cupid and Psyche, by the French author Jean de La Fontaine.

Fontaine began writing around 1665, and the work was first published in 1669. Unlike his popular Fables, which began publication the previous year, Les amours de Psyché was not a success and did not earn favour from the king.

Fontaine cites Apuleius's The Golden Ass, the first written version of a much older myth, as his source for the story of Cupid and Psyche. The literary scholar Michel Jeanneret describes his use of the myth as part of a seventeenth-century tendency to rewrite classical stories by "strip[ping] the pagan fable of its ethical or metaphysical value, to employ it as decoration and a cultural signifier." (Note: French: Faussant compagnie à Racine, La Fontaine et ses contemporains dépouillent la fable païenne de sa valeur éthique ou métaphysique pour l'utiliser comme décoration et signe culturel.) More generally, Jeanneret associates the work with a Baroque taste for luxury, beauty, and pleasure that characterized Louis XIV's court at the Palace of Versailles after 1661.

== Sources ==
- Harrison, Stephen; May, Regine (2024). Apuleius in European Literature: Cupid and Psyche since 1650. Oxford University Press. doi:10.1093/oso/9780192862983.003.0002.
- Jeanneret, Michel (1991). "Introduction". Les Amours de Psyché et de Cupidon. Le Livre de Poche Classique. ISBN 9782253051916.
- Vipper, Yu. B. (1987). "Lafonten". Istoriya vsemirnoy literatury (in Russian). Vol. 4. Moscow: Nauka. pp. 152–159.
