= Rouge: The Sexiest Show in Vegas =

Adult revue in Las Vegas

Rouge: The Sexiest Show in Vegas is an adult revue performed at The Strat Theater in Las Vegas, Nevada. Created and directed by Hanoch Rosènn, the production combines dance, acrobatics, aerial acts, contortion, comedy, and topless revue elements.

== History ==
Rouge began preview performances at The Strat Theater in April 2022. Its world premiere was held at The Strat on May 17, 2022. The show was developed by Rosènn after his earlier Las Vegas productions WOW – The Vegas Spectacular and Extravaganza. In a 2022 report for the Las Vegas Sun, Brock Radke wrote that the production was designed to fill a late-night slot at The STRAT Theater. It has passed 2,000 performances and has been seen by more than 500,000 guests. Related international productions have also been staged in Berlin and Gran Canaria.

== Production ==
The production uses a co-ed cast and includes dance, aerial straps, hand-balancing, skating, contortion, comedy, and other variety acts. John Katsilometes of the Las Vegas Review-Journal reported after a rehearsal that the show mixed revue elements with specialty acts, comedy, and large video-screen backdrops.

== Reception ==
In the Las Vegas Review-Journal, Katsilometes described the cast as talented and noted that the production included both traditional acrobatic numbers and sexually themed comedy. The same article also reported a complaint by a former swing performer about the production process, which the company disputed.

Matt Kelemen of Las Vegas Magazine described Rouge as a neo-burlesque show built around acrobatics, choreography, audience interaction, and revue staging. In a later review for the same publication, Kelemen wrote that the production emphasized both male and female performers and framed its toplessness through tease, comedy, and physical-performance acts.

Em Jurbala of Las Vegas Magazine wrote in 2024 that the show presented adult revue material as a mix of comedy, variety performance, and sexuality, and quoted Rosènn describing the production as an attempt to treat the genre artistically.

Performers from Rouge appeared on Live with Kelly and Mark during the program's February 2024 Las Vegas broadcasts.
