= The Bath of Psyche =

Painting by Frederic Leighton

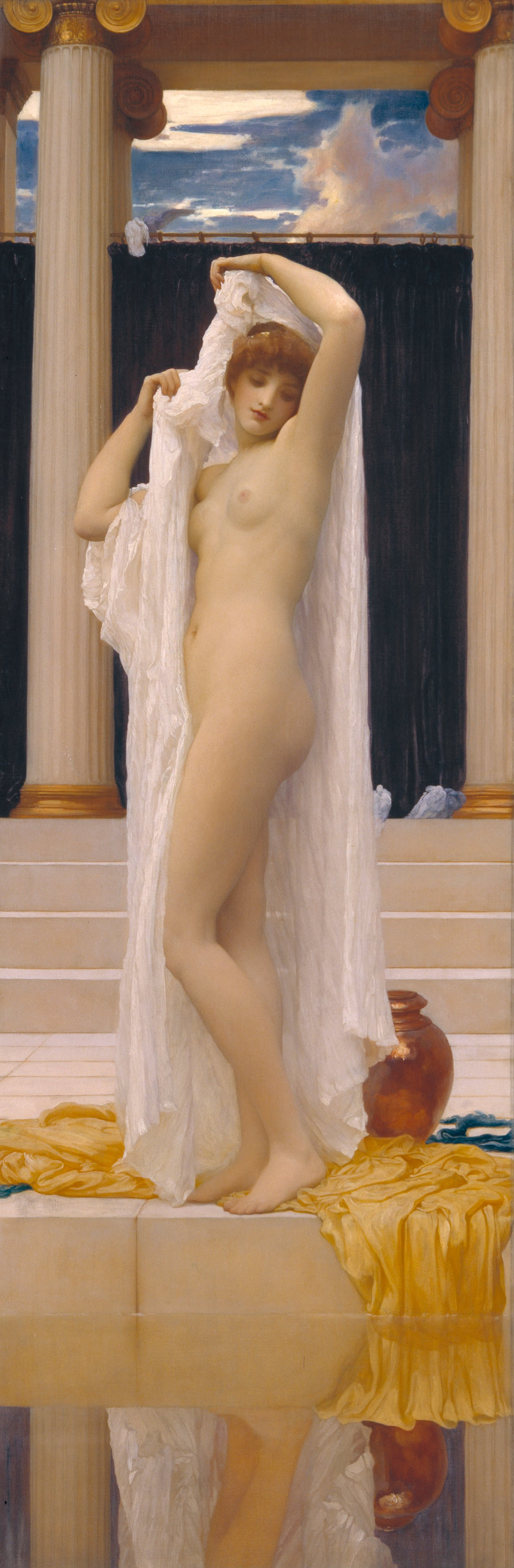
- Artist: Frederic Leighton
- Year: 1890
- Medium: Oil on canvas
- Dimensions: 189.2 cm × 62.2 cm (74.5 in × 24.5 in)
- Location: Tate Britain

The Bath of Psyche is an oil painting by Frederic Leighton, first exhibited in 1890. It is in the collection of Tate Britain.

== Description ==
The painting shows Psyche disrobing in order to bathe before the arrival of Cupid. She is completely absorbed in the pleasurable inspection of her own person, and her narcissism is emphasised by her reflection in the still surface of the water.

The subject of a bather and the polished draughtsmanship show the influence of Ingres, and especially such works as The Source. The subject's pose, with arms lifted to reveal her nude body, derives from the Venus Callipyge, a celebrated Greco-Roman statue that Leighton would have seen and admired at the Museo di Capodimonte in Naples.

== Context ==
The legend of Cupid and Psyche was popular source material for writers and artists in the second half of the 19th century. The story originated in the Roman writer Lucius Apuleius's Metamorphoses, commonly known as The Golden Ass.

Psyche dwelt in the golden palace of Cupid, the god of love. Each night Cupid would visit Psyche's bedchamber to lie with her under cover of darkness, without revealing his divinity. Leighton shows Psyche undressing to bathe before Cupid's arrival, gazing at her reflection.

== History ==
=== Panel (1887) ===
The picture was suggested, according to M. H. Spielmann, by the "paper knife" picture, as Lord Leighton called it, which he had painted for Sir Laurence Alma-Tadema's wall screen.

Leighton was among a group of some 45 artists invited by Alma-Tadema to aid in the decoration of the atrium of his house in Grove End Road, St John's Wood (Leighton was offered one of Alma-Tadema's own pictures in kind). Each artist was tasked with painting a narrow panel—32 inches high and between 2½ and 8 inches wide—for The Hall of Panels.

The difficulty of finding a subject was humorously suggested by Lord Leighton, who offered to paint a panel. Sir Lawrence sent him the dimensions. A few days after they met at dinner at the house of a mutual friend. They were sitting directly opposite one another, and, picking up a long, narrow-bladed dessert knife, Lord Leighton turned to his comrade in art and said: "My dear Tadema, what sort of subject do you expect me to paint on this?"

=== Painting (1890) ===
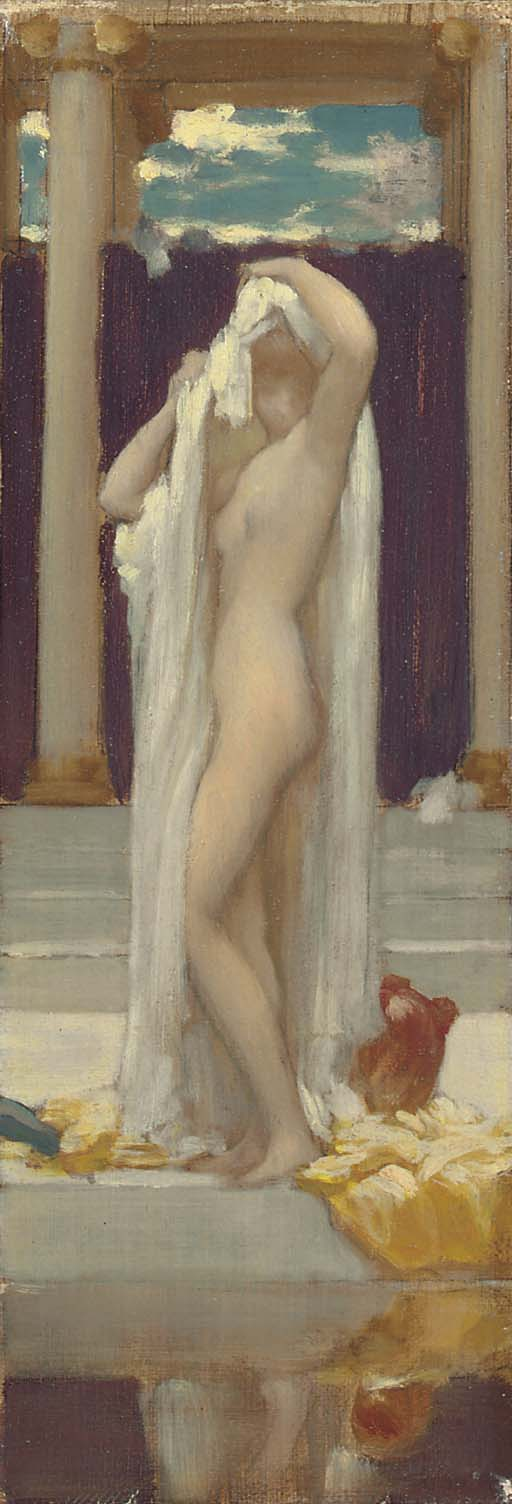
Study, 10½ x 3½ in (26.7 x 8.9 cm)

The exigencies of the space at his disposal were sufficient to account for the peculiar nature of the original composition. When, however, he determined to enlarge the idea for a painting on canvas he cut off much of the water and the reflections from it and added the colonnade of marble columns in order to widen the space. The original panel measured 32 inches by 6½ inches; the painting is almost twice its width.

In 1890 The Bath of Psyche was exhibited at the Royal Academy of Arts. The critic of The Spectator was full of praise:

Whether you call No. 310 "Psyche," or, better, "Soma," we can admire her pretty, graceful lines, and the wonderful pure colour of the curtain and the sky, of the gold and of the copper, and the unfaltering hand that has drawn that body so simply and so tenderly.

This at once established its position as a popular favourite, and it was probably more widely reproduced than any other of Leighton's works in the painter's lifetime. It was purchased under the terms of the Chantrey Bequest, and entered the collections of the Tate Gallery.

== Sources ==
- Ash, Russell (1995). Lord Leighton. London: Pavilion Books Limited. p. 75. [Plate 30].
- Cordova, Rudolph de (February 1902). "The Chantrey Bequest". The Strand Magazine. xxiii (134): 199–207.
- Cordova, Rudolph de (December 1902). "The Panels in Sir Lawrence Alma-Tadema's Hall". The Strand Magazine. Vol. xxiv. No. 144. pp. 615–630.
- Gaunt, William (1975). Victorian Olympus. London: Sphere Books Ltd. pp. 105, 151.
- Jones, Stephen, et al. (1996). Frederic Leighton, 1830–1896. Royal Academy of Arts, London: Harry N. Abrams, Inc. pp. 19, 29, 82, 146, 194, 214–215.
- Landow, George P. (5 September 2017). "Bath of Psyche, by Frederic Lord Leighton". The Victorian Web.
- Portugeis, Chloe. "Leighton, Bath of Psyche". Khan Academy. Retrieved 5 June 2022.
- Rhys, Ernest (1900). Frederic Lord Leighton: An Illustrated Record of his Life and Work. London: George Bell & Sons. pp. 48–49, 59.
- Staley, Edgcumbe (1906). Lord Leighton of Stretton. London: The Walter Scott Publishing Co., Ltd.; New York: Charles Scribner's Sons. pp. 140–141, 214, 225.
- "Art. The Royal Academy. [Second Notice.]". The Spectator. Vol. 64. No. 3,229. 17 May 1890. pp. 693–695.
- "Study for The Bath of Psyche". Christie's. 16 June 2005.
- "'The Bath of Psyche', Frederic, Lord Leighton, exhibited 1890". Tate.
