= Red House, Buntingford =

Country house in Buntingford, Hertfordshire, England

Coordinates: 51.949726°N 0.020577°W

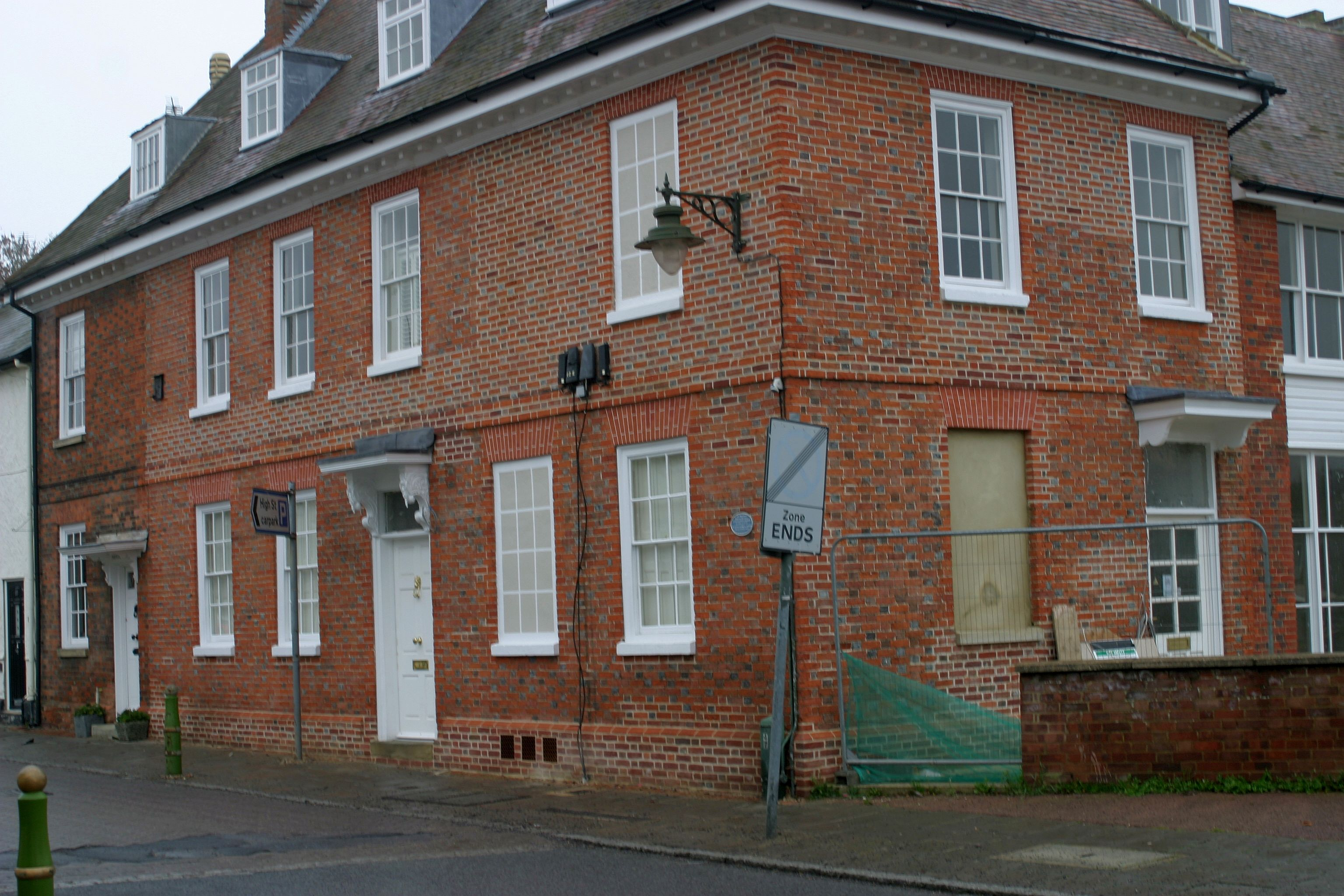
Red House, Buntingford, Herts.

The Red House is a Queen Anne style house built around 1710 opposite the intersection of Norfolk Road and High Street in Buntingford, Hertfordshire, England. It was inhabited by artist and stage designer Claud Lovat Fraser, who designed the Buntingford war memorial and other aspects of the town. The building was used by estate agency Churchills, but currently (November 2013) appears unoccupied. It is a Grade II Listed Building.

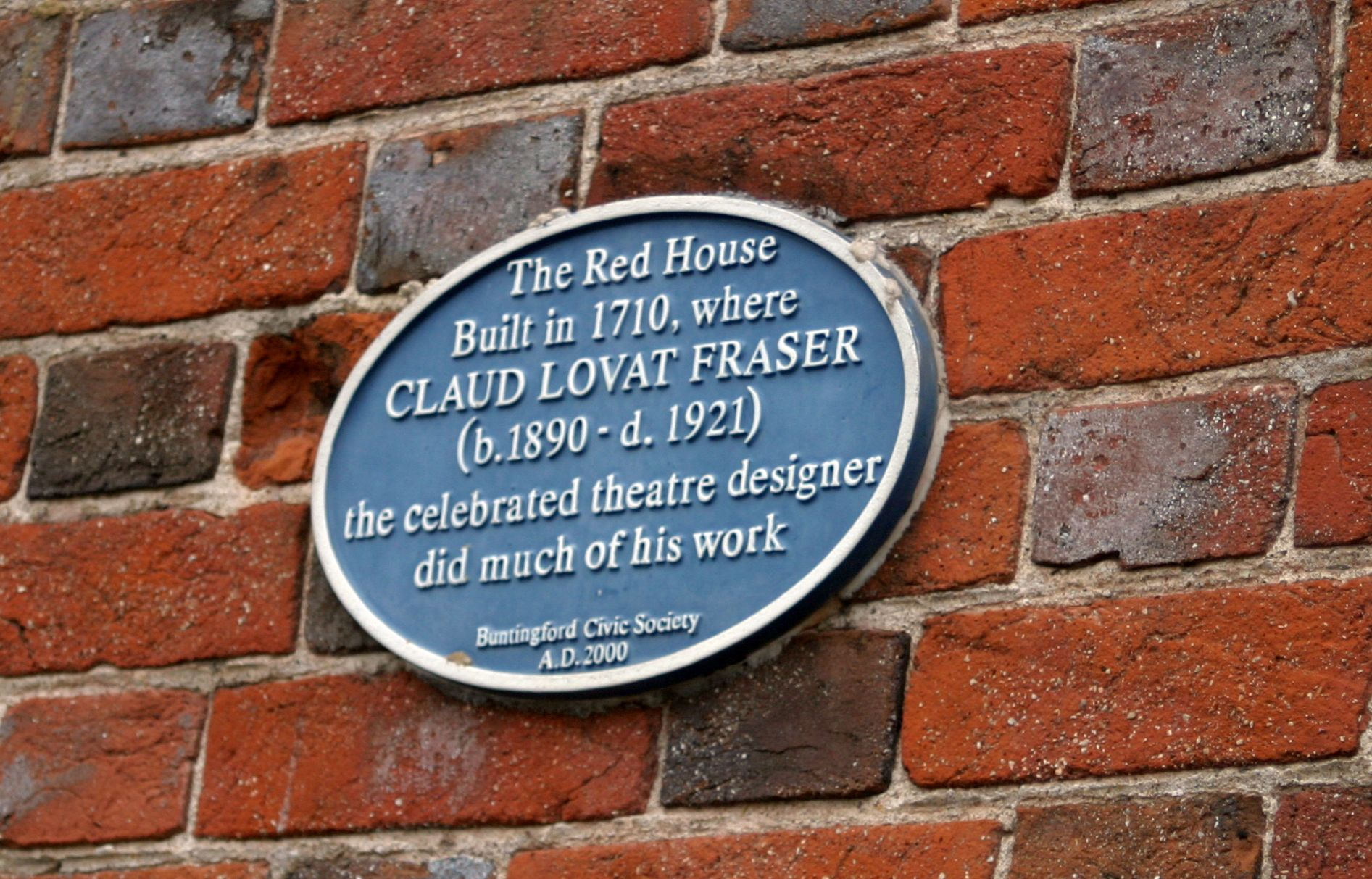
Blue Plaque on the Red House.
