= Miguel Ángel de la Flor =

Peruvian army officer

Miguel Ángel de la Flor (1924 – January 12, 2010) was a Peruvian army officer. He was born in Chiclayo and died in Lima, Peru.

A Peruvian general, he was Minister of Foreign Affairs of the Revolutionary Government of the Armed Forces headed by Juan Velasco Alvarado from 1972 to 1976. In foreign policy, in contrast with his 1970s Latin American contemporaries, which were mostly right-wing military dictatorships, he pursued a partnership with the Soviet bloc. He tightened relations with Cuba and Fidel Castro and undertook major purchases of Soviet military hardware.

== See also ==
- History of Peru

Diplomatic posts
Preceded by Edgardo Mercado Jarrín	Peruvian Minister of Foreign Affairs; 1972–1976	Succeeded by José de la Puente Radbill
