= Cap-Rouge, Nova Scotia =

Ghost town

Cap-Rouge
- Former community
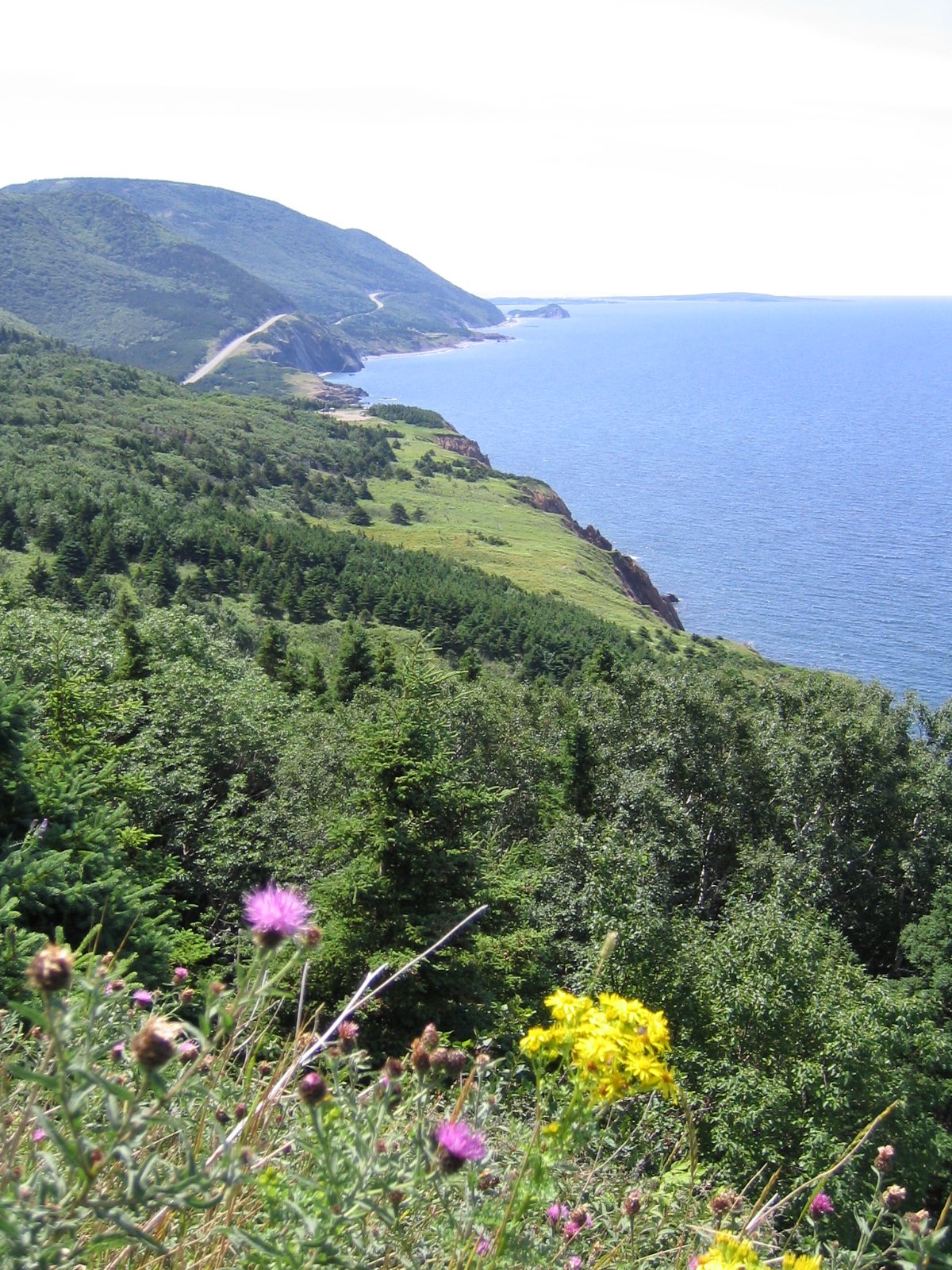
- Site of Cap-Rouge today
- Interactive map of Cap-Rouge
- Coordinates: 46°42′42″N 60°56′24″W
- Country: Canada
- Province: Nova Scotia
- Inverness County, Nova Scotia: Cape Breton Highlands National Park
- Established: 1864
- Time zone: UTC-4 (AST)
  - Summer (DST): UTC-3 (ADT)
- NTS Map: 011K10
- GNBC Code: CBGMR

Cap-Rouge was an Acadian village of some 30 families situated on Cape Breton Island, north of Chéticamp, in Nova Scotia, named for the nearby cape of the same name. The Cap Rouge region followed the western coast of Cape Breton Island, extending about seven miles to the north of Chéticamp. It included La Bloque, Ruisseau des Maurice (Trout Brook), Rivière à Lazare (Corney Brook) and Ruisseau du Canadien. Today however, the name Cap-Rouge is used to refer to all Acadian communities expropriated for the creation of the National Park, including the Rigouèche, the Buttereau, the Presqu’île and the Source de la Montain.

== History ==
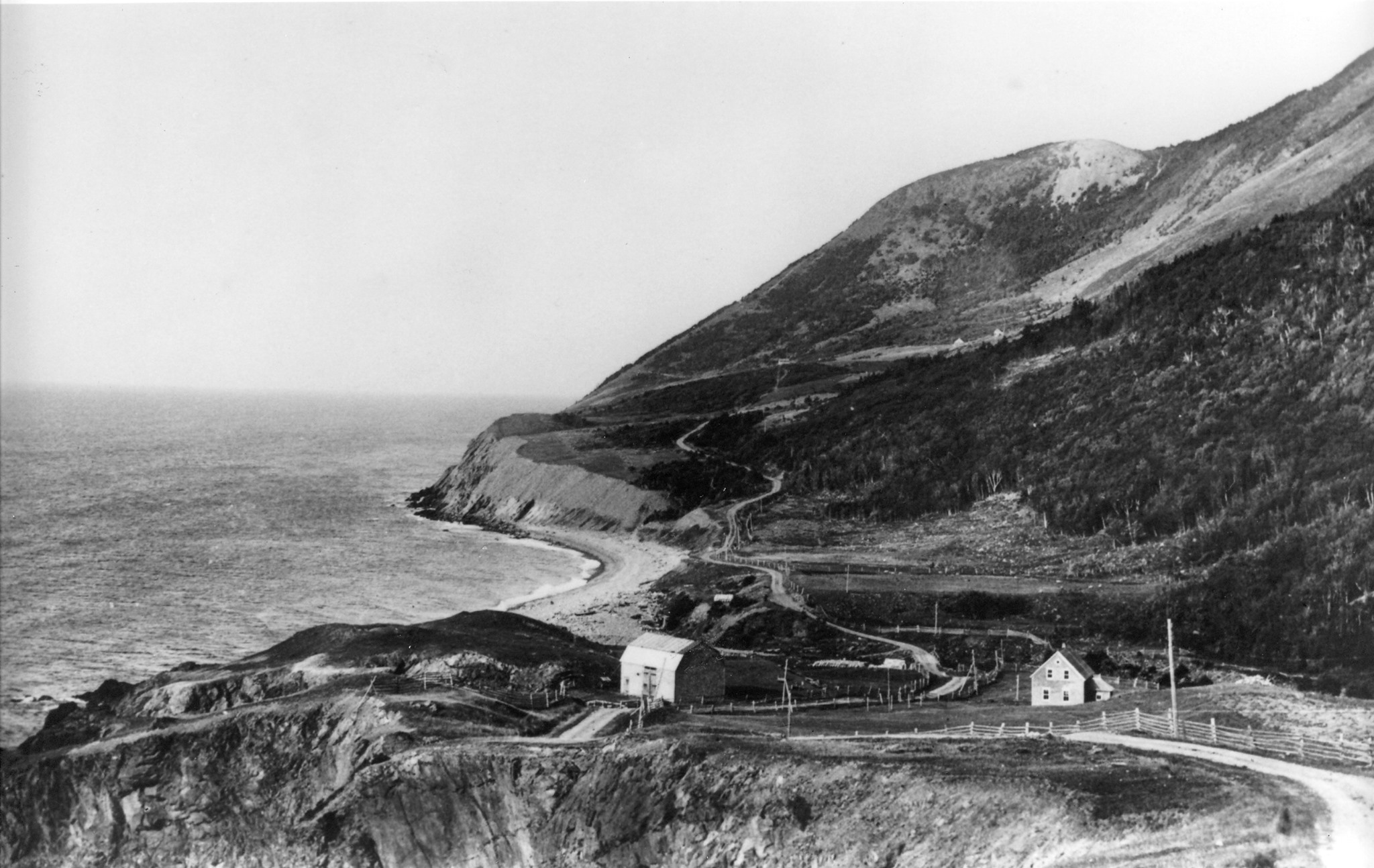
Cap-Rouge, circa 1900

Some of the earliest grants of land in Cap-Rouge were made starting in 1826, with later grants following in 1864, 1867, 1868, and 1869. Other land concessions were awarded between 1873 and 1906. The first school was opened in La Presqu'île around 1877 before later being located higher on the mountain in 1904. A Post Office was established June 1, 1899 at the home of Vieux Maurice Aucoin who become the first Postmaster. Two lobster factories had already been established between 1900 and 1925. By 1936 the Cap-Rouge region included a sawmill located in La Rigoueche, a general store, a wharf, post office and school.

=== Expropriation ===
The village properties were expropriated and the residents evacuated between 1936 and 1939 during the foundation of Cape Breton Highlands National Park, this despite the fact that many Scottish and English villages such as Pleasant Bay, and Ingonish were preserved. In the summer of 1940, on July 7, the Cap-Rouge post office was officially closed.

=== Hiking Trail ===
The former village site is accessible today, by following a Parks Canada maintained trail, "Le vieux chemin du Cap-Rouge", located on the Cabot Trail across from the Trout Brook picnic area. Remains of an old school, foundations of the former residents' houses, and the old wharf at La Bloc visible at various points along the trail. An exhibit at the look-off at the south end of the trail provides further information on the families who used to live there.
