= Orinduik Falls =

Waterfalls on the Brazil-Guyana border

- Location: Brazil-Guyana
- Coordinates: 4°43′34″N 60°02′15″W

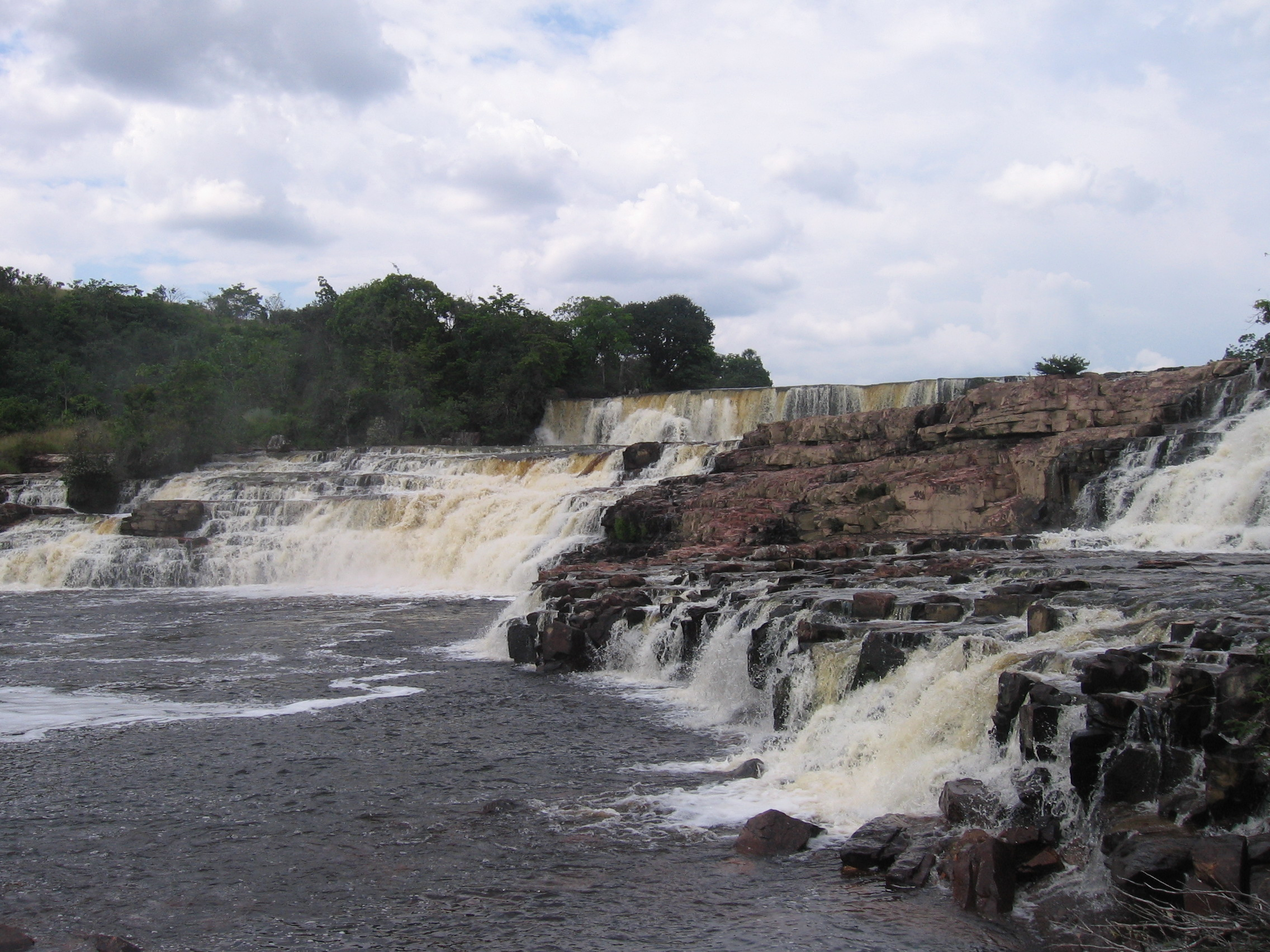
Orinduik Falls in September 2007

The Orinduik Falls lie on the Ireng River on the Pakaraima Mountains. Orinduik Falls is a wide, multi-tiered series of cascades. Waterfall is approximately 25 m tall and more than 150 m wide.

There are other waterfalls on Ireng River, including the approximately 100 m tall Kurutuik Falls located more than 40 km to the north, but due to hard accessibility these falls are rarely visited.

The area is inhabited by Macushi and Patamona people, and there are a few villages in the vicinity of the falls.

== Etymology ==
Orin is a type of aquatic plant found in this river, which is harvested, dried and chewed like tobacco by the Amerindians of the region, whereas duik means falls (both words in Patamona language).

== Tourism ==
Orinduik Falls is one of the main tourist attractions in Guyana. The falls lie at the edge of the Pakaraima Mountains. There are frequent flights from Ogle Airport and Cheddi Jagan International Airport in Georgetown and most tours are combined with Kaieteur Falls. The Ministry of Tourism facilitates an annual safari through Region 8 and 9 with the falls as a major point of interest.
