= Mont Rouge =

Mountain in Switzerland

- Location within Switzerland

Highest point
- Elevation: 2,491 m (8,173 ft)
- Prominence: 21 m (69 ft)
- Coordinates: 46°9′26.1″N 7°21′25.5″E

Geography
- Location: Valais, Switzerland
- Parent range: Pennine Alps

Mont Rouge is a mountain of the Swiss Pennine Alps, located south of Nendaz and Hérémence in the canton of Valais. It lies between the valleys of Nendaz and Hérémence, on the chain north of the Rosablanche.
