= Félix-Jacques Moulin =

French photographer

Félix-Jacques Antoine Moulin
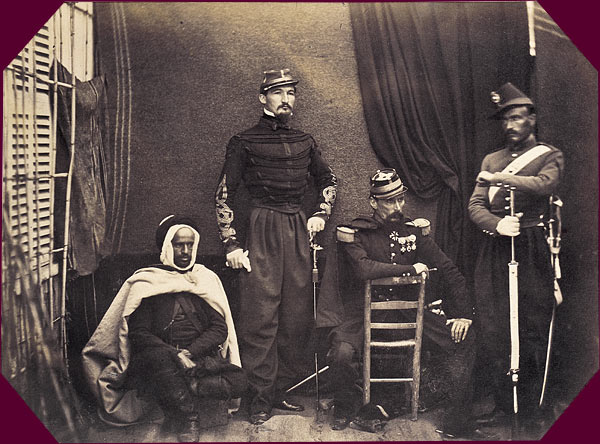
- Born: 27 March 1802; Paris, France
- Died: 12 December 1875 (aged 73); Paris, France
- Occupation: Photographer
- Known for: Photographic nudes, reportages of the French colonial Empire

Félix-Jacques Antoine Moulin (27 March 1802 – 12 December 1875) was a French photographer.

== Biography ==
In 1849, Moulin opened a photographer's studio at 31 bis rue du Faubourg Montmartre and started producing daguerreotypes of young girls aged 14 to 16. In 1851, Moulin's work was confiscated, and he was sentenced to one month imprisonment for the "obscene" character of his works, "so obscene that even to pronounce the titles (...) would violate public morality" according to court records.

After his release, Moulin continued his activities more discreetly. He taught photography, sold photographic equipment, and had a backdoor installed to his studio to dodge further legal problems. His works gained esteem from critics.

In 1856, Moulin made a photographic trip to Algeria, with a tonne of equipment, backed and financed by the French government, which allowed it to gain benefit from the structures of colonialism. There, he met technical difficulties due to variations in humidity, work in the open, and the quality of water, but managed nonetheless to extensively document the benefit of French colonies in Northern Africa. He came back in 1858 with hundreds of photographs of landscapes, cities, archeologic surveys and portraits of inhabitants, and published 300 of them as L'Algérie photographiée, a three-volume in folio work. These documents became official brochures of the colonial rule of Napoléon III, to whom the work was dedicated. They toured Europe in several expositions.

Moulin retired in 1862 and died in 1875.

== Gallery ==
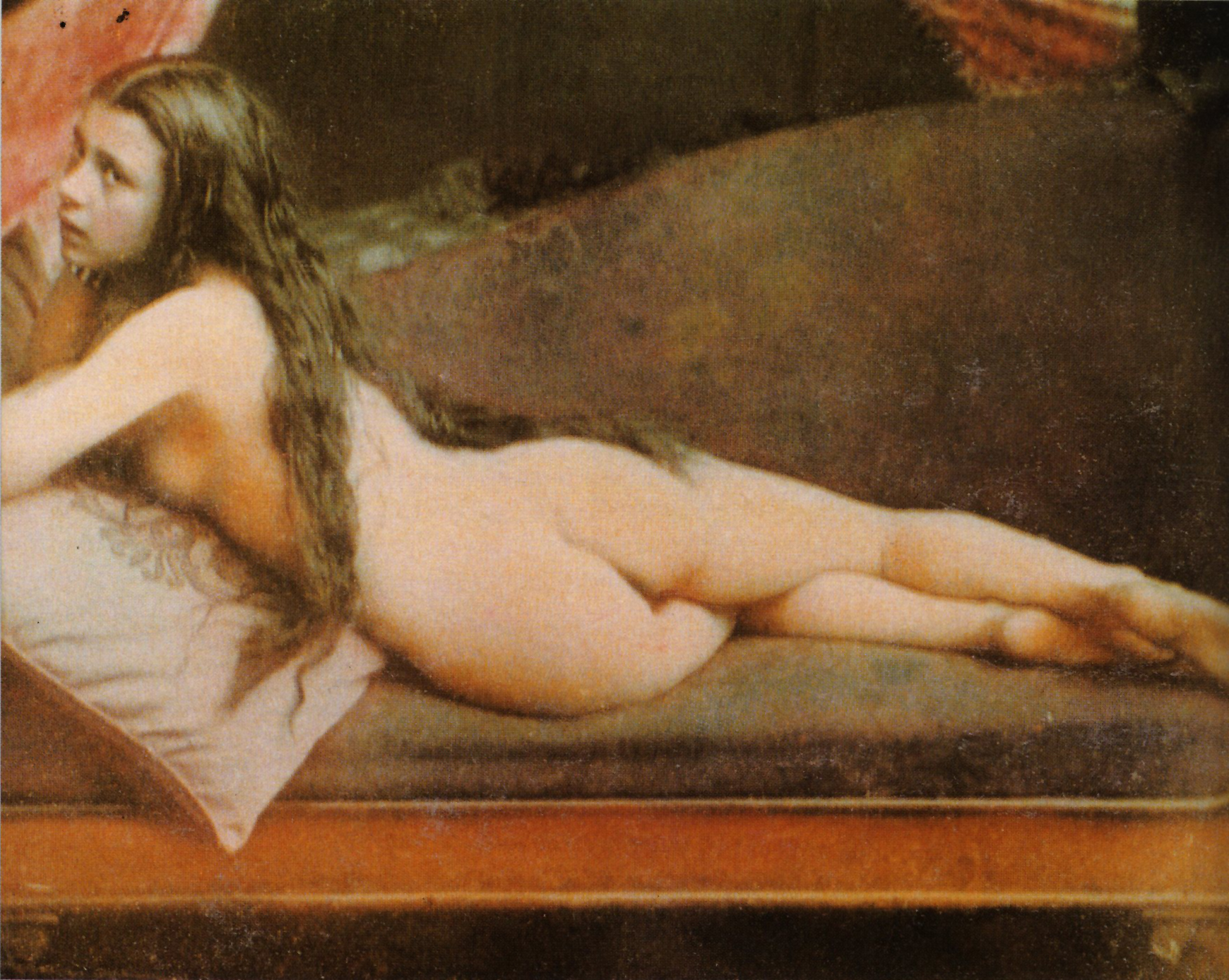
Nude woman in colored daguerreotype by Moulin, circa 1851–1854

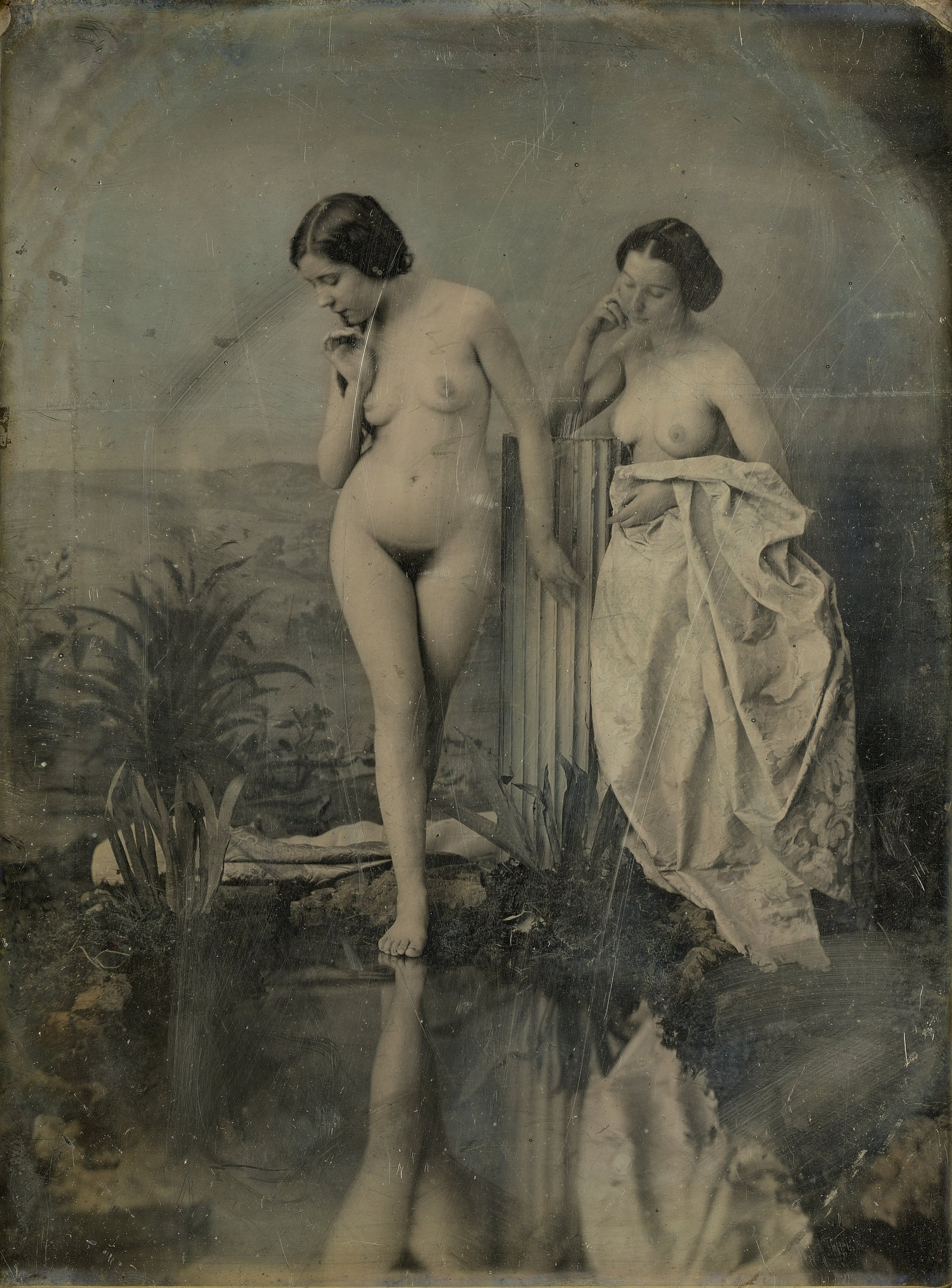
The Bathers, circa 1851–1855 (the sisters Antonette and Christine Roux)

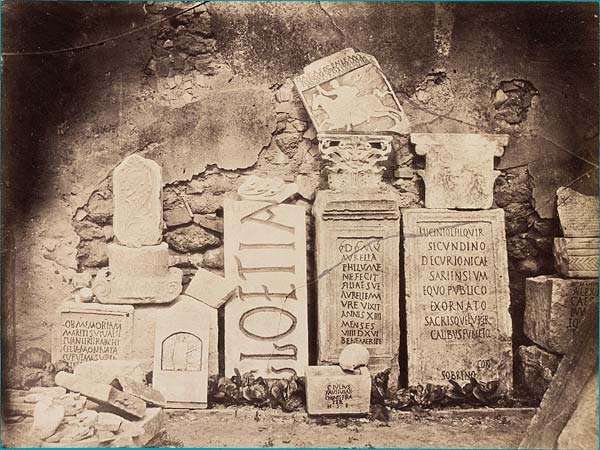
Archeologic survey, photography of ancient Roman inscriptions from Cherchell, 1856

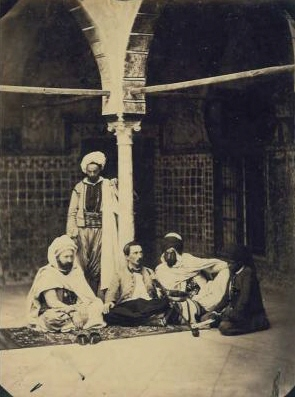
Si Hassan Lieutenant Senac Seliman, 1856
