= Moulins =

Moulins(French for mill) may refer to:

== Places ==
- Diocese of Moulins
- Moulins, Allier, in the Allier department (the largest Moulins)
- Moulins, Aisne, in the Aisne department
- Moulins, Ille-et-Vilaine, in the Ille-et-Vilaine department
- Moulins-Engilbert, in the Nièvre department
- Moulins-en-Tonnerrois, in the Yonne department
- Moulins-la-Marche, in the Orne department
- Moulins-le-Carbonnel, in the Sarthe department
- Moulins-lès-Metz, in the Moselle department
- Moulins-Saint-Hubert, in the Meuse department
- Moulins-sur-Céphons, in the Indre department
- Moulins-sur-Orne, in the Orne department
- Moulins-sur-Ouanne, in the Yonne department
- Moulins-sur-Yèvre, in the Cher department
- Moulin-Mage, in the Tarn department
- Moulin-Neuf, Ariège, in the Ariège department
- Moulin-Neuf, Dordogne, in the Dordogne department
- Moulin-sous-Touvent, in the Oise department

== See also ==
- Moulin (disambiguation)
