= Mount Rouge =

Mountain in Graham Land, Antarctica

Mount Rouge (65°37′S 63°42′W) is a prominent mountain between Funk and Cadman Glaciers at the head of Beascochea Bay, on the west side of Graham Land on the Antarctic Peninsula. Discovered and named Massif Rouge (red mountain) by the French Antarctic Expedition, 1908–10, led by Jean-Baptiste Charcot.
