= Bourda Cemetery, Guyana =

Cemetery in Georgetown, Guyana

Bourda Cemetery
- Interactive map of Bourda Cemetery

Details
- Location: Georgetown
- Country: Guyana
- Coordinates: 6.808894°N 58.158306°W
- Find a Grave: Bourda Cemetery

Bourda Cemetery is an eighteenth-century cemetery situated on Bourda Street in Georgetown, Guyana. Formerly known as "Bourda's Walk", Bourda cemetery is the oldest cemetery in Georgetown, and the only surviving plantation cemetery in the city. It is considered a national landmark and has been listed as a monument by the National Trust of Guyana.

== History ==
Boarda cemetery was originally constructed as a part of Plantation Vlissengen, which was owned by Joseph Bourda (d. 1798) – a Dutch colonist who was twice governor of Demerara (then a Dutch colony). When Bourda's son (and principal heir) disappeared at sea, the government of British Guiana entered into an agreement with his remaining heirs to take over the plantation, which included the wards of Bourda, New Town, Queenstown, and Robbstown. The agreement – called the Vlissengen Ordinance of 1876 – entrusted the government with custodial duties to maintain Bourda cemetery.

Bourda Cemetery has repeatedly come under threat of demolition or relocation from Mayors and City Councils of Georgetown. In 1960 H. R. Persaud and the Historical Society organised a campaign to save the cemetery after the local government when it first came under threat. In 1992, the local government proposed the relocation of the cemetery in order to make way for a road to run through its present site. Shortly before works were about to start, however, the Guyana Heritage Society obtained a legal injunction preventing the Mayor and the City Council from constructing a road through the cemetery grounds. Proposals for demolition or re-location have been made by different administrations in 1960, 1982, 1992, 1995, 1996, 1999, 2001, 2004 and 2011.

== Burials ==
Many prominent people from the Guyana's colonial era are buried in Bourda cemetery, including William Booker, John Croal (the first mayor of Georgetown), John Patoir and Peter Rose.

== See also ==
- Botanical Gardens: also built on Plantation Vlissengen (now separated by several blocks)
