= St. Andrew's Kirk, Georgetown =

St. Andrew's Kirk
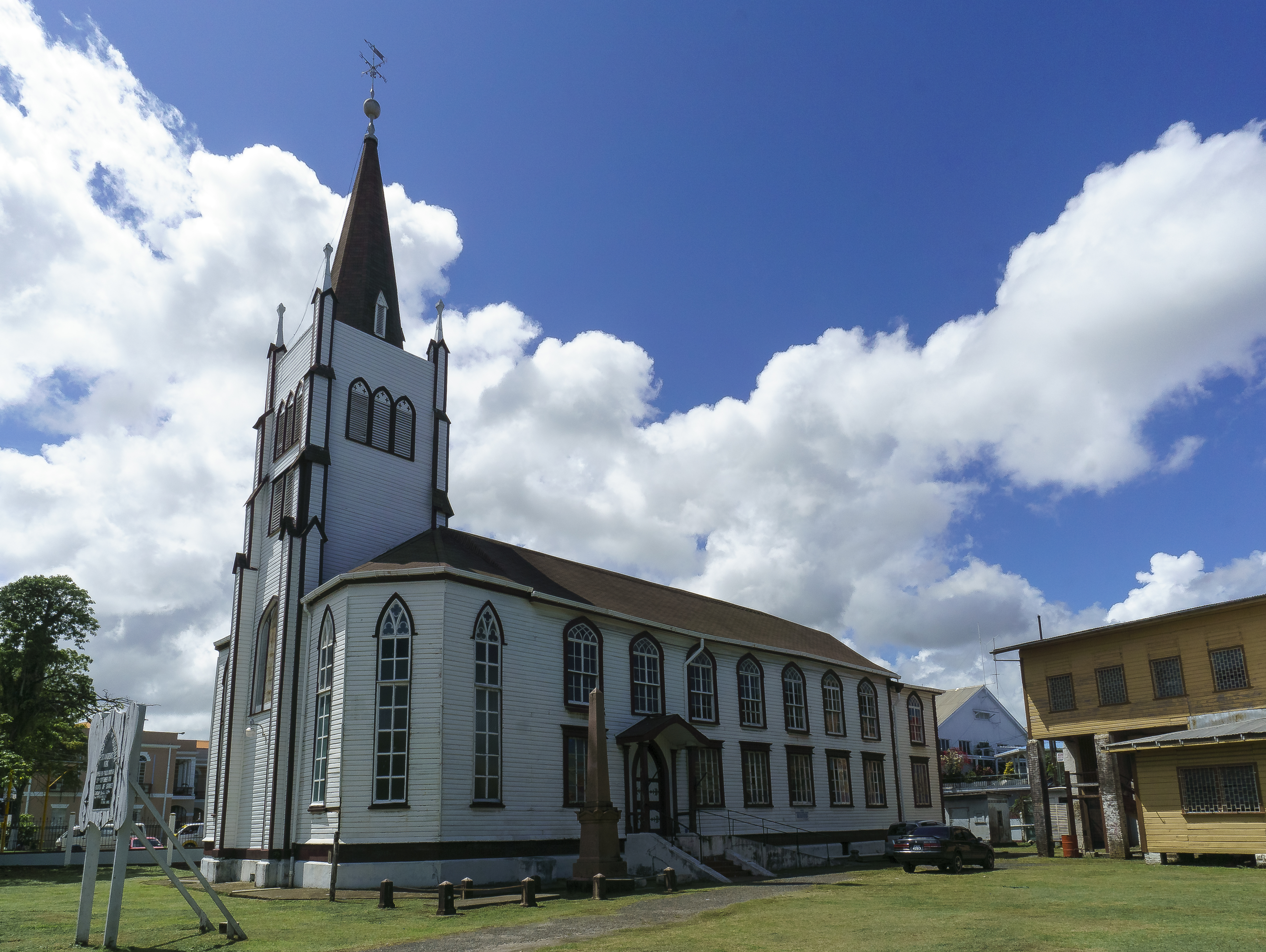

- Location within Guyana
- 6.80952°N 58.16631°W
- Location: Georgetown
- Country: Guyana
- Denomination: Scottish Presbyterian

History
- Consecrated: 28 February 1818

Architecture
- Years built: 1811-1818

St. Andrew's Kirk is one of the oldest buildings in Georgetown, Guyana that has been continually in use for religious purposes. Construction began in 1811, led by the Dutch Reformed Church; they were forced to abandon it for financial reasons and so St. Andrew's Kirks was only opened in 1818 by Scottish Presbyterians.

It was the first church in Guyana built by Europeans in which slaves were allowed to worship. It is situated near the Parliament Building on the north eastern corner of Brickdam. During its bicentennial in 2018, then President David A. Granger remarked that the church was a "social microscope", as a monument to the city's colonial Dutch and British heritage, the first church to open its doors to enslaved Africans, and also as barracks for the Provisional Battalion deployed for suppressing the Demerara rebellion of 1823. A historic service was held to mark Emancipation on 1 August 1838, which was attended by then Governor Sir Henry Light and many Afro-Guyanese. The church established a school in 1841 and hosted public concerts and recitals.

== Leadership ==
Rev. Oswald Allen Best was the first Guyanese minister serving from 1974 until his death in April, 2009. In September 2011, Reverend Maureen Massiah, was appointed. Massiah is the first female Minister elevated to the full status of Ordained Minister.

== See also ==
- St. George's Cathedral, Georgetown
- Religion in Guyana
