= Stabroek, Guyana =

Stabroek
- Ward
- Location within Guyana
- Coordinates: 6.8070406°N 58.1599689°W
- Country: Guyana
- City: Georgetown
- Established: 1782

Area
  - Total: 0.65 km^{2} (0.25 sq mi)

Stabroek is a ward in the centre of Georgetown, Guyana, having previously been the old name of the wider city itself, between 1784 and 1812.

== History ==
Historical population
| Year | Pop. |
|---|---|
| 1789 | 780 |
| 1807 | 8,500 |
| 2012 | 251 |

The ward's name, as the old name of the city, is reflected in Georgetown's main market, Stabroek Market, which has existed on or near its present location since the 18th century, and the newspaper Stabroek News, established in 1986. The Parliament Building is located in Stabroek on the same spot where the Court of Policy used to be.

== Gallery ==
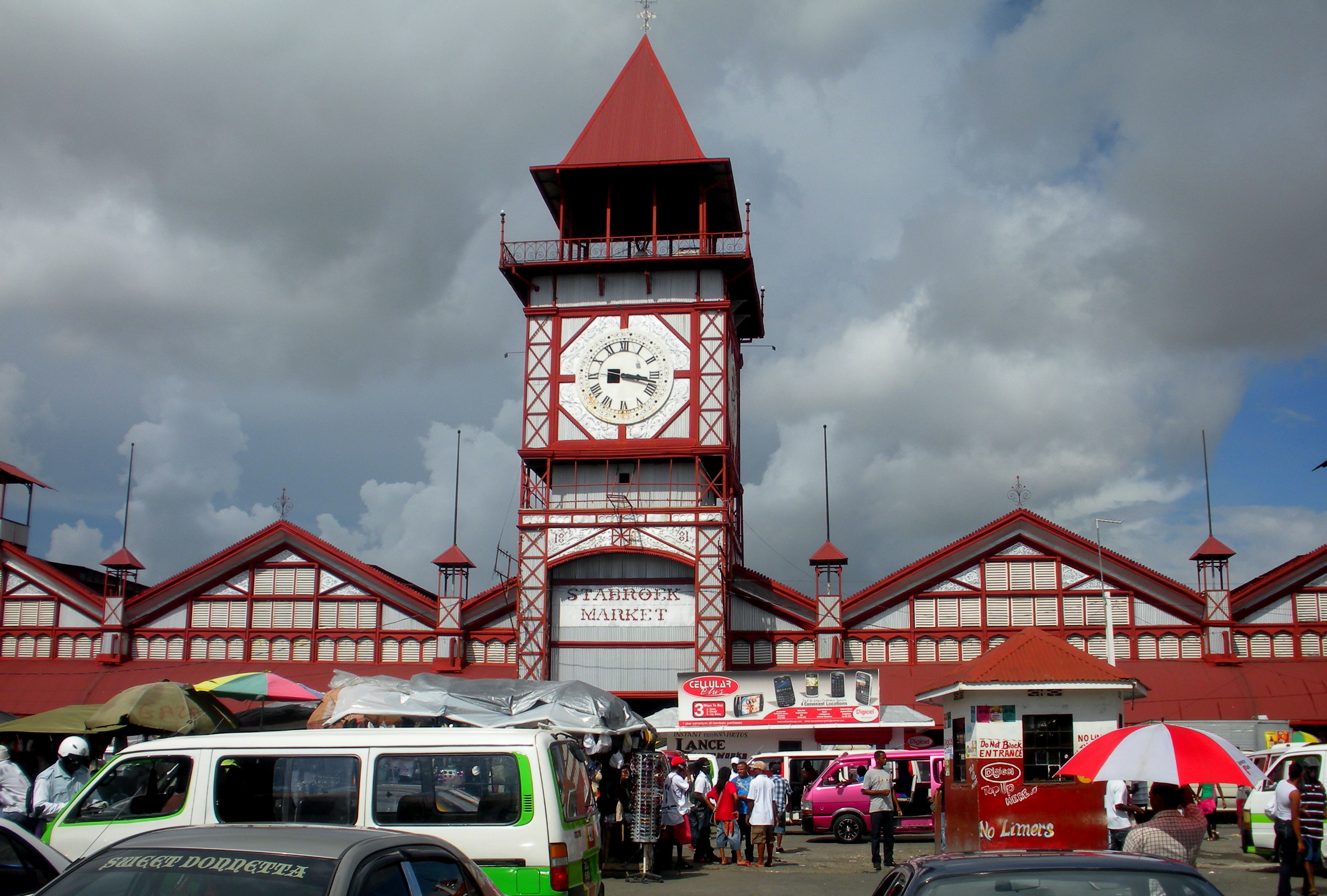
Stabroek Market

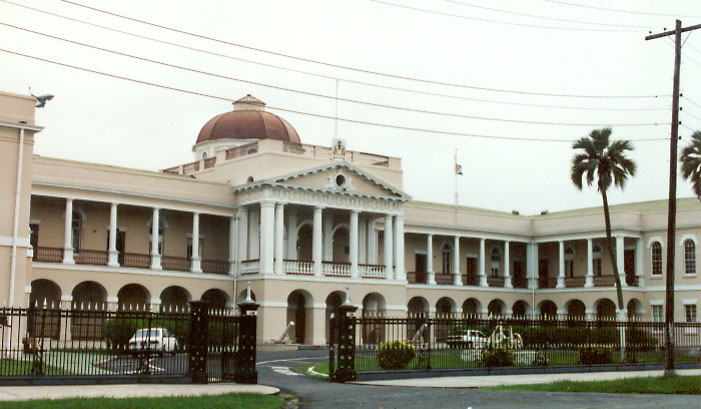
Parliament Building

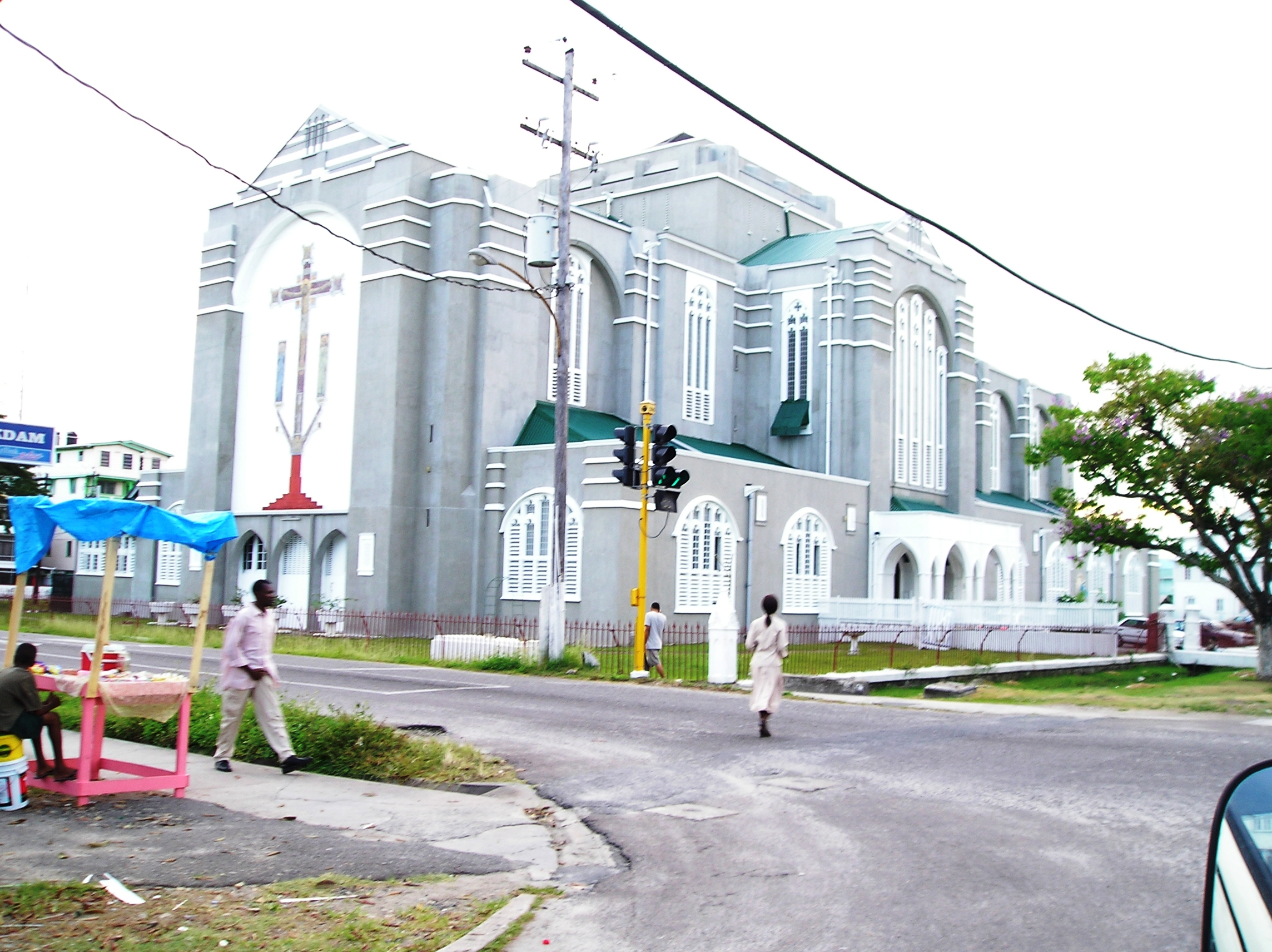
Immaculate Conception Cathedral

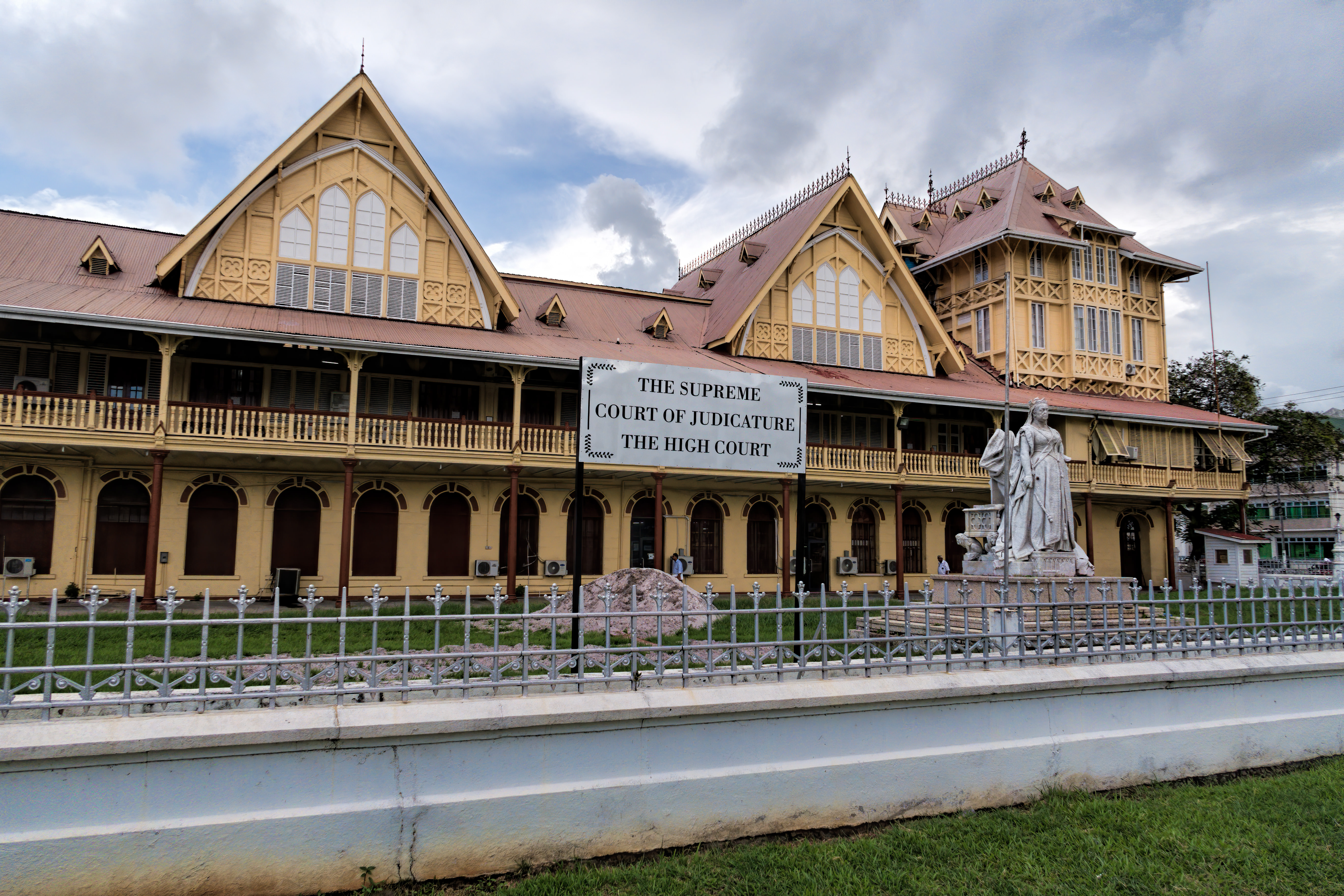
Supreme Court

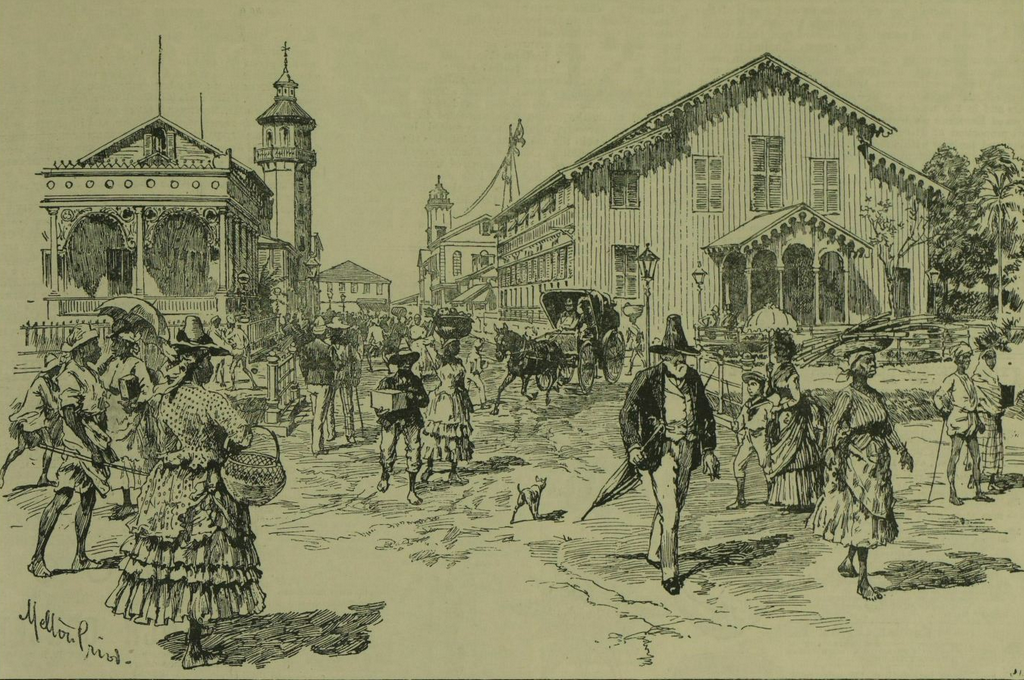
Stabroek in 1888

== Bibliography ==
- Netscher, Pieter Marinus (1888). Geschiedenis van de koloniën Essequebo, Demerary en Berbice, van de vestiging der Nederlanders aldaar tot op onzen tijd (in Dutch). The Hague: Martinus Nijhoff.
