= Leonard Fryer =

Leonard Fryer may refer to:

- Leonard Fryer (16th-century artist) (died 1605?), English artist
- Leonard Fryer (designer) (1891–1965), British artist and designer
