= Museum of African Heritage =

Museum in Guyana

- MAH
- Location: 13 Barima Avenue, Bel Air; Georgetown, Guyana
- Coordinates: 6.81091°N 58.14586°W
- Type: African diaspora
- Website: Facebook page

The Museum of African Heritage is a museum in Bel Air, Georgetown, Guyana, "created by the Government of Guyana to collect, preserve, exhibit, research art and artifacts relating to Africa and the African experience in Guyana". It was founded in 1985, with the African Art collections of Hubert H Nicholson and Desiree Malik. The art collection has since expanded to contain Caribbean art, along with more African art. The museum also has a detailed history of the 1763 Berbice Slave Rebellion, along with artifacts celebrating notable Afro-Guyanese men and women.
