= Georgetown Cenotaph =

Monument in Georgetown, Guyana

Barbados Cenotaph
- Interactive map of Barbados Cenotaph
- Location: Junction of Main and Church Streets, Georgetown, Guyana
- Coordinates: 6.813624°N 58.165242°W
- Type: Cenotaph
- Opening date: 1923-08-14

The Georgetown Cenotaph is a war memorial in Georgetown, Guyana, located at the junction of Main and Church Streets.
