= Thomas Moulder =

Guyanese cricketer

Personal information
- Full name: Thomas Henry Knight Moulder
- Born: 25 May 1872; Georgetown, British Guiana
- Died: 9 June 1920 (aged 48)
- Batting: Right-handed
- Bowling: Unknown

Domestic team information
- Years: Team
- 1891/92: Demerara
- 1896–1902: Oxfordshire

Career statistics
| Competition | First-class |
|---|---|
| Matches | 3 |
| Runs scored | 101 |
| Batting average | 25.25 |
| 100s/50s | –/1 |
| Top score | 51 |
| Balls bowled | 85 |
| Wickets | 0 |
| Bowling average | – |
| 5 wickets in innings | – |
| 10 wickets in match | – |
| Best bowling | – |
| Catches/stumpings | 2/– |
- Source: Cricinfo, 25 June 2019

Thomas Henry Knight Moulder (25 May 1872 – 9 June 1920) was a first-class cricketer from British Guiana.

Moulder was born at Georgetown in British Guiana in May 1872. He played three first-class cricket matches for Demerara in the 1891–92 Inter-Colonial Tournament, playing twice against Barbados and once against Trinidad. He scored 101 runs in his three matches, with a high score of 51. He later played minor counties cricket in England for Oxfordshire between 1896–1902, making eighteen appearances in the Minor Counties Championship. He died in June 1920.
