= Splashmins Fun Park =

Amusement park near Georgetown, Guyana

Coordinates: 6.5015°N 58.2164°W

Splashmins Fun Park and Resort is an amusement park near Georgetown, Guyana. It is located on the Soesdyke-Linden Highway. The theme park features shows, plant life and beaches. The park is built on one hundred and sixty four acres of amidst numerous species of flora and a variety of fauna which include bird life. Splashmin is a privately owned resort.

== Park history ==
The park.

Construction for this amusement park began in 1997. After three years of construction the park was opened in 2000.

The park consists of beaches, palm lined walkways, numerous picnic areas and water slides. Splashmins features a man made black water lake with white sandy beaches that overlooks Guyana's natural vegetation, Benabs, food and drinks bars, a gift shop, water rides, hotel and camping facilities.

In 2011, Splashmins Fun Part hosted the final leg of the Miss Jamzone International pageant. In 2018, the part hosted an amateur women's boxing tournament.

In 2015, Ashmins Fun Park and Resorts (parent company of Splashmins and Madewini Villas) became the first private-sector company to access financing to construct a wastewater treatment plant. The daily treatment of 139,000 litres of wastewater to standards outlined in the provisions of the Protocol of Land-Based Sources (a part of the Cartagena Convention) will be reused at the park facilities in efforts to reduce marine pollution.

In 2018, lifeguard services were cancelled after claims that negligent staff contributed to the death of a teenager. Signs were put up to advise patrons they were "swimming at their own risk" in the government owned waterways.

Lennox John, the owner, also owned department store Ashmins in Georgetown at Hadfield and High Street from 1990 until 2018.
