= Guyana National Park =

Urban park in Georgetown, Guyana

- The National Park
- Interactive map of Guyana National Park
- Type: Urban park
- Location: Thomas Lands, Georgetown, Guyana
- Coordinates: 6.82125°N 58.15044°W
- Area: 57 acres (23 ha)
- Created: 1965
- Operator: National Parks Commission (NPC)

Guyana National Park (normally simply the National Park) is an urban park in Georgetown, Guyana and was opened with Queen Elizabeth II in attendance and was formerly named Queen Elizabeth II National Park in honour of her state visit.

Despite its name of "national park", it is not a natural reserve. It was built on a former golf club.

== Description ==
There is a circular road that is popular with joggers and other city dwellers looking to exercise.

In the north of the park, there is a pond with captive manatees. There are also some in the Botanical Gardens several blocks to the south.

The Children’s Millennium Monument was unveiled in the park in 2000. It is a simple sculpture with a smiling sun, a symbol of strength and growth of Guyana's children. There is also another beautiful monument: the Wakili Totem Pole. This carving was revealed in 2015. It represents the balance between man and nature.

== History ==
- c. 1800–1923: Plantation Thomas, a sugar estate.
- 1923–1965: the Demerara Golf Club
- 1965: The park was established, named the Queen Elizabeth II National Park in anticipation of the queen's visit to the country.
- February 1966: The park officially opened, with the queen in attendance.
- May 1966: The park was renamed simply as "the National Park" in recognition of the country's independence.

== Environs ==
- North: sports grounds; and beyond them, the Seawall and Shell Beach.
- East: the Guyana Defence Force's Base Camp Ayangana.
- South: some plots of land and Queen's College.
- West: Marian Academy.

== See also ==
- Also in Georgetown:
  - Guyana Botanical Gardens
  - Promenade Gardens
- Kaieteur National Park: a natural park in Guyana
