= Guyana Zoo =

Guyana Zoological Park
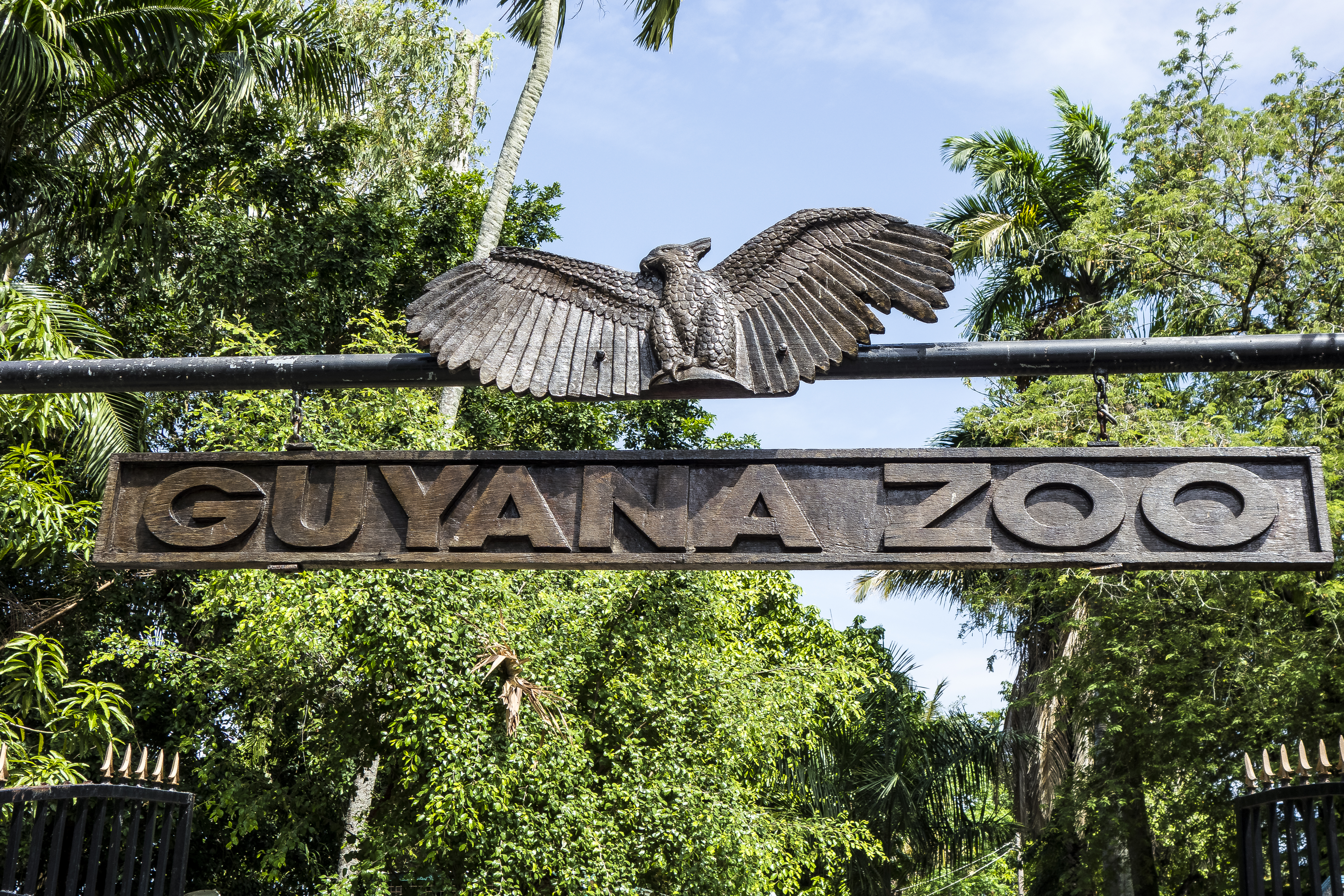
- Interactive map of Guyana Zoological Park
- 6.80605°N 58.146311°W
- Date opened: 1952
- Location: Georgetown, Guyana
- Website: Official site

Guyana Zoo (officially Guyana Zoological Park) is a zoo located in Georgetown, the capital of Guyana. The zoo officially opened in 1952, but its grounds had been used as botanical gardens since 1895. Some of its most popular attractions are harpy eagles and manatees.

As of 2005, the zoo had approximately 25 staff.

== History ==
In 1877, the government voted to establish a botanical garden, bringing in John Frederick Waby from the UK who spent the next 35 years in landscaping Guyana's gardens. The gardens feature tropical flowers and palms, including the national flower, the Victoria Regia Lily.

Interest in creating a zoo is traced back to 1880, but it wasn't until 1952 when the zoo was opened. The zoo features endemic as well as endangered animals of Guyana.

The zoo received criticism in 2010 for not fitting the standard of modern zoos. The high expense of overhaul and lack of funding and private sector support have been an issue.

== Partnership ==
The Calgary Zoo has partnered with Guyana Zoo as "sister" zoos.
