= National Cultural Centre (Guyana) =

Coordinates: 6.80261°N 58.14002°W

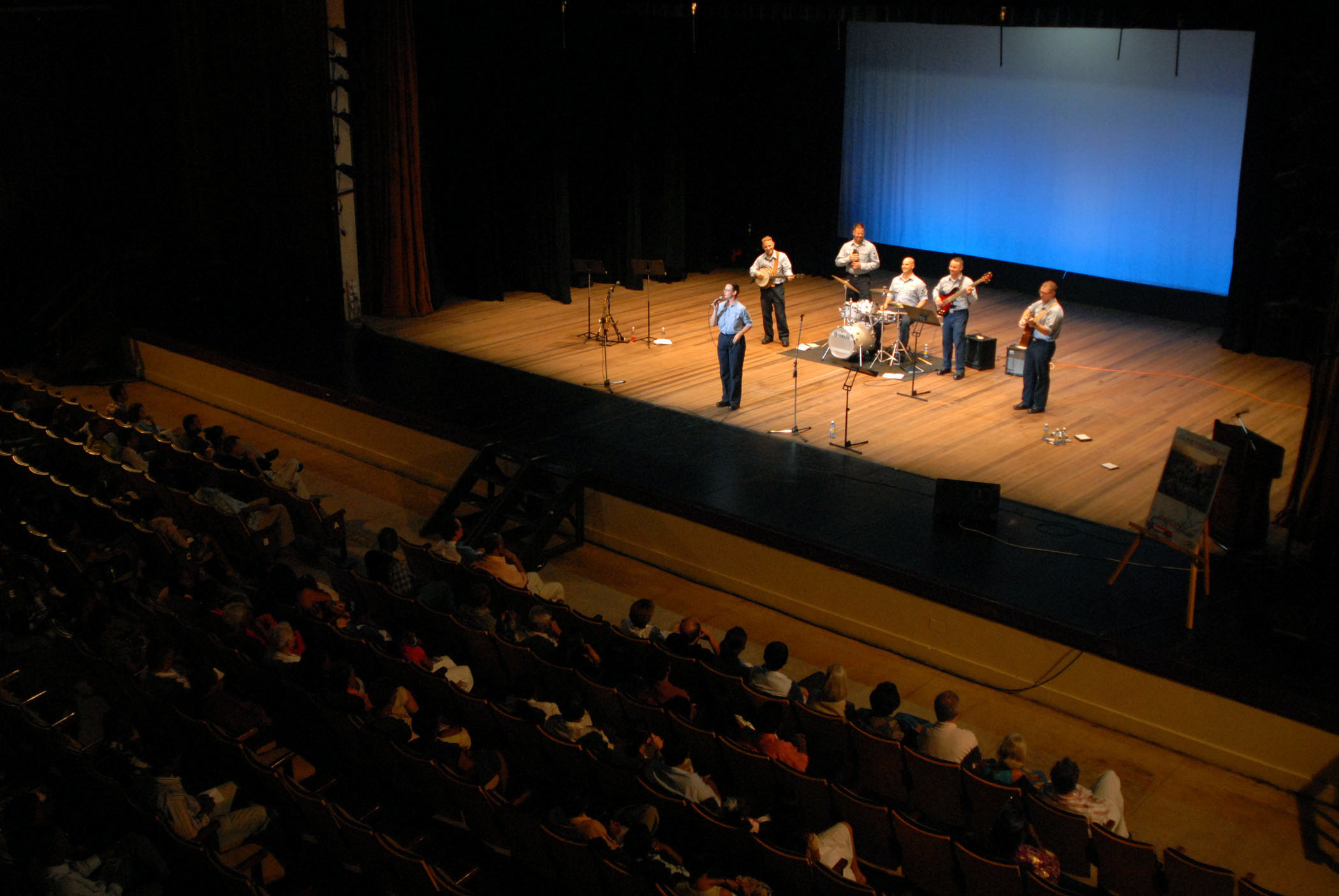
- US Navy Band performing at National Cultural Centre (2007)

- Location within Guyana

General information
- Location: Georgetown, Guyana
- Completed: 16 May 1976

The National Cultural Centre is the premier auditorium for cultural presentations in Georgetown, Guyana. It is on Homestretch Avenue, in D’Urban Park (south of the Botanical Gardens). It hosts theatre, music, and dance as well as other events.

It rises 62 feet (19 m), is 240 feet (73 m) long and 115 feet (35 m) wide, and seats about 2,000 people. Its stage is 48 feet (15 m) deep with an orchestra pit, and has a 72-foot-wide (22 m) and 20-foot-high (6.1 m) opening.

The centre was officially opened on 16 May 1976.

The centre received sound system upgrades in 2019

It houses the National Drama School, and hosted the National Drama Festival until 2017.
