= Guyana Botanical Gardens =

Botanical garden in Georgetown, Guyana

- Georgetown Botanical Gardens
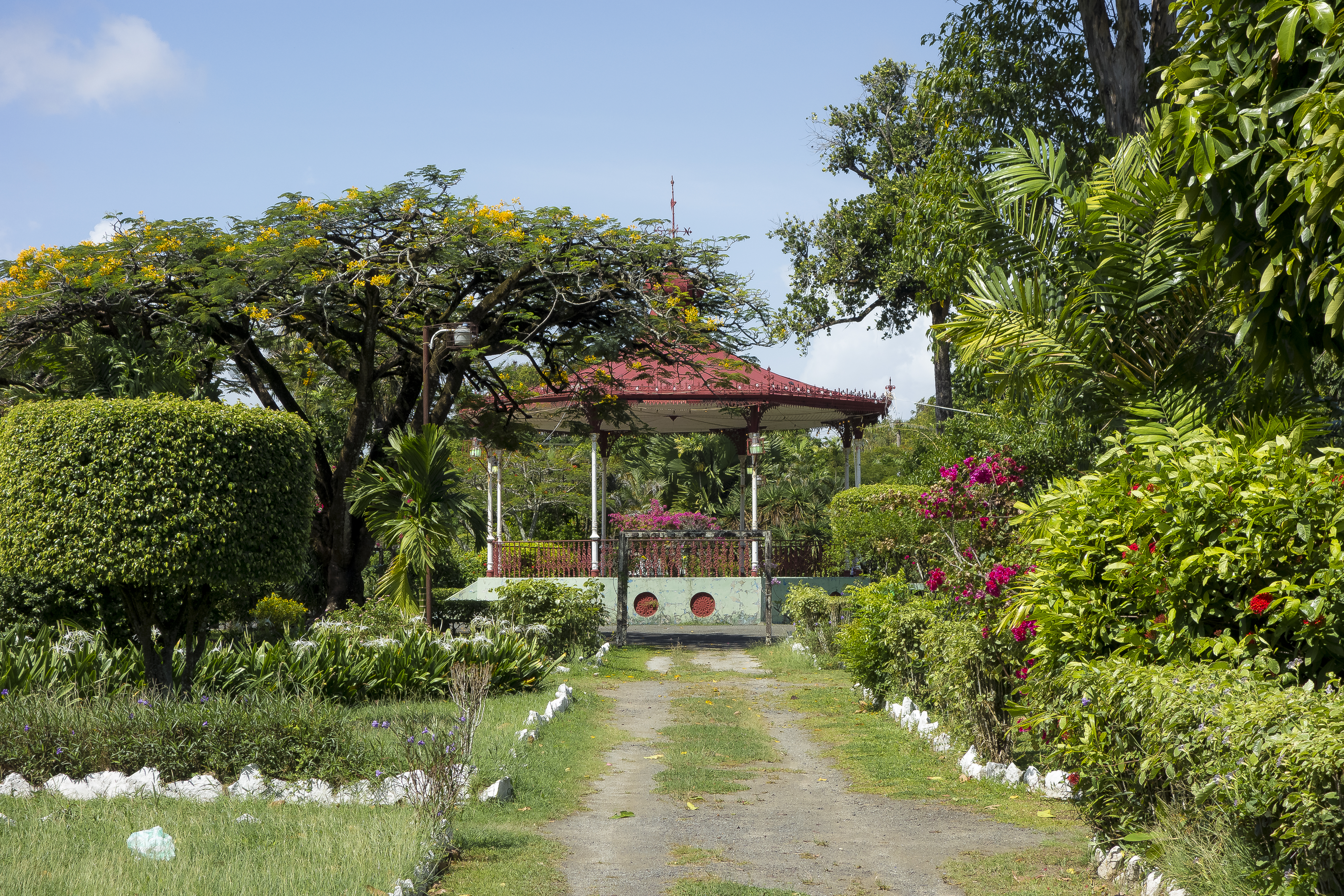
- Interactive map of Guyana Botanical Gardens
- Type: Urban park
- Location: Georgetown, Guyana
- Coordinates: 6.80547°N 58.14602°W
- Created: late 19th century

Guyana Botanical Gardens is a tropical botanical garden in Georgetown, Guyana. It is next to the Guyana Zoo and Castellani House.

== Description ==
It includes the Seven Ponds (the Place of Heroes), which is the burial sites of

- Governor General David Rose
- President Desmond Hoyte
- President Arthur Chung
- poet Martin Carter

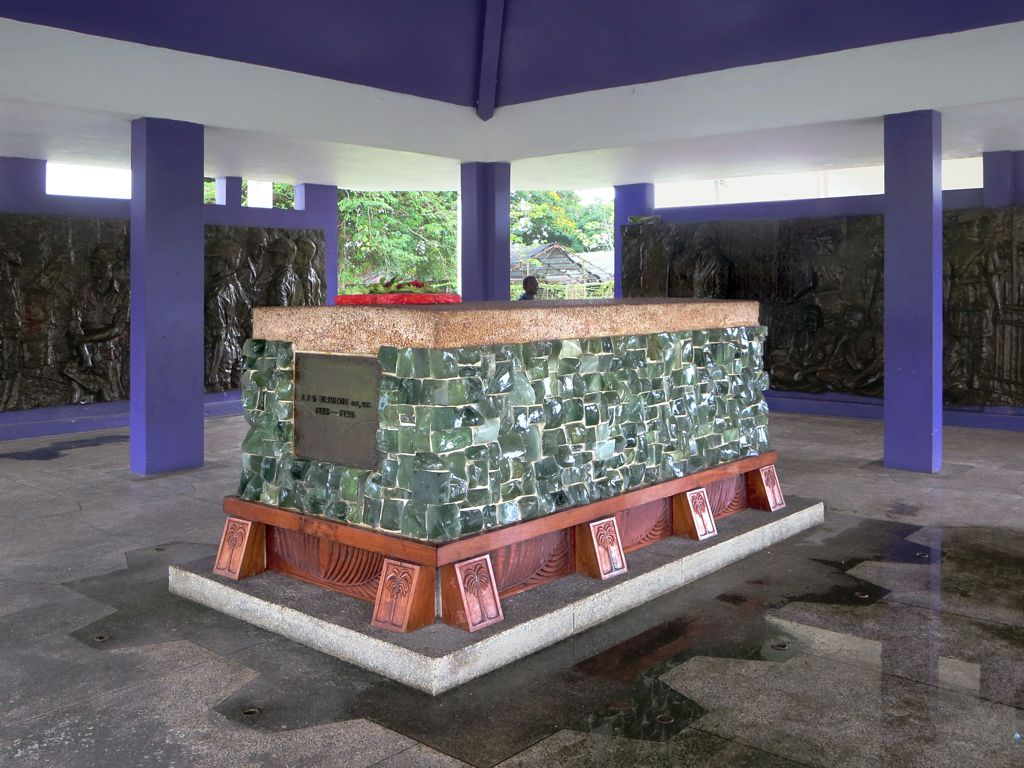
Mausoleum of President Forbes Burnham

- in a separate nearby mausoleum: Prime Minister Forbes Burnham

Near the zoo (but outside of it), there are docile manatees in a pond. The first manatees were placed in the gardens in the 1870s. More captive manatees are at the National Park.

== History ==
It was founded in the late 19th century, during the time of British Guiana, on an abandoned sugar estate, Plantation Vlissengen. At the time, it was at the eastern end of the city limits. An early garden superintendent was botanist George Samuel Jenman.

== Environs ==
South of the gardens, across Homestretch Avenue is D’Urban Park, which includes the National Cultural Centre. It is bound by Vlissengen Road to the west, across which is Georgetown Football Club. It is a few blocks south of the National Park.

The other public garden in Georgetown is the smaller Promenade Gardens downtown.

== See also ==
- Bourda Cemetery: also built on Plantation Vlissengen (now separated by several blocks)
