= Stabroek Market =

Market in Georgetown, Guyana

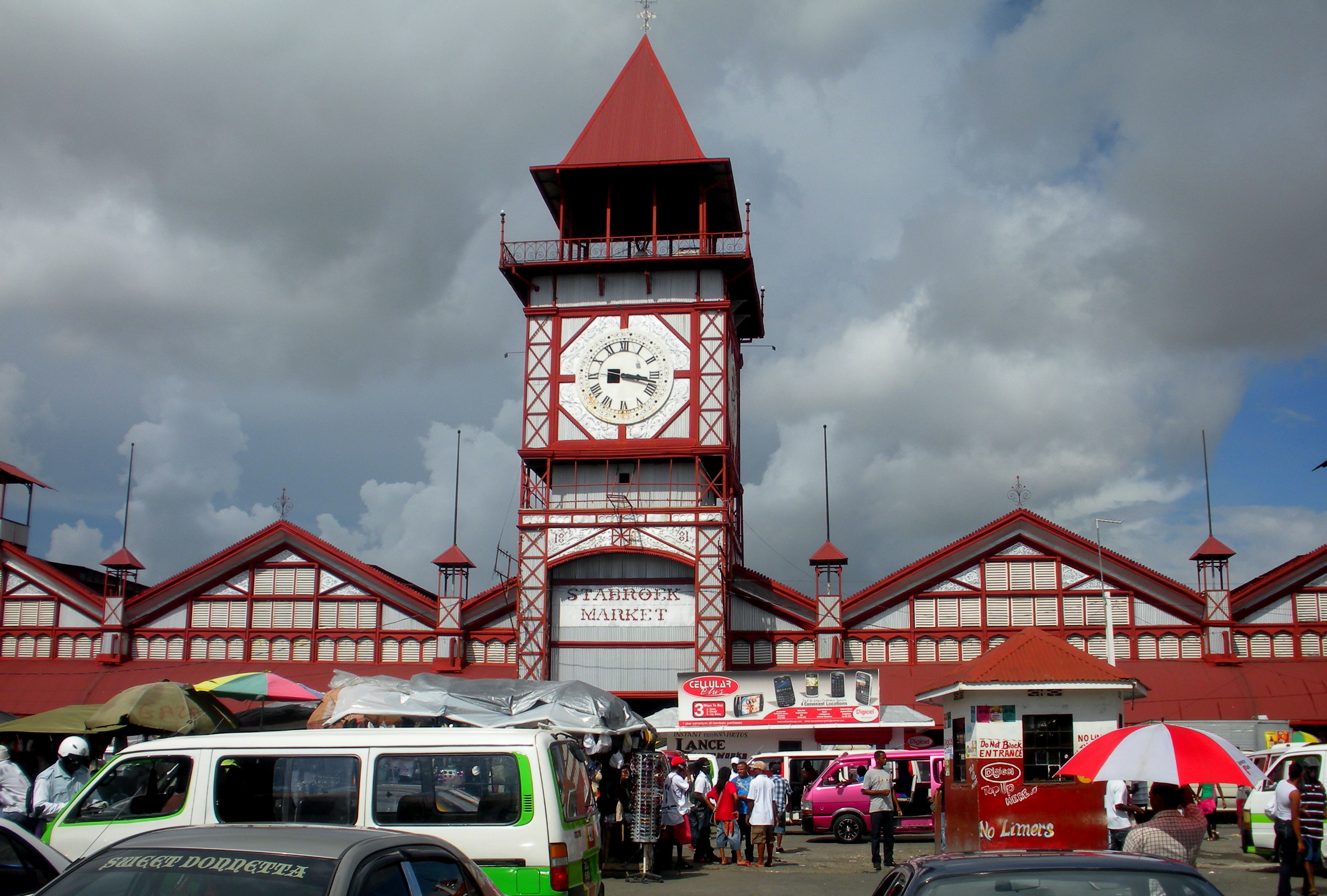
- The front entrance to Stabroek Market in Georgetown.

- Location within Guyana

General information
- Architectural style: Victorian architecture
- Location: Stabroek, Georgetown, Guyana
- Coordinates: 6.80993°N 58.16760°W
- Construction started: 1880
- Inaugurated: 1 November 1881

Technical details
- Floor area: 80,000 square feet (7,000 m^{2})

Design and construction
- Architect: Nathaniel McKay

Stabroek Market is the largest market of Georgetown, Guyana. Located in the centre of the capital city, the market is housed in an iron and steel structure with a prominent clock tower.

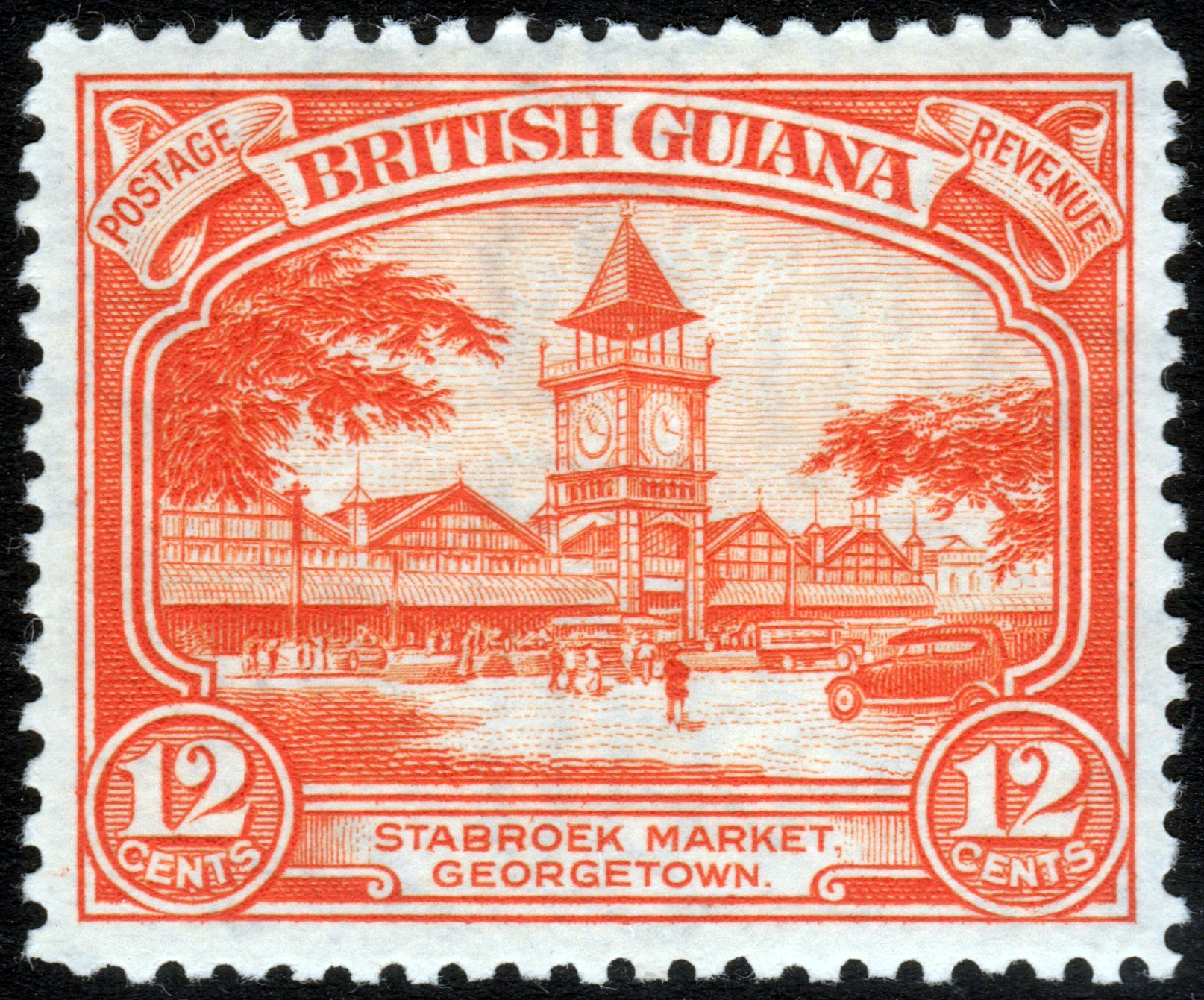
Stabroek Market on a 1934 stamp of British Guiana designed by Leonard Fryer

== Construction ==
In 1842, the Georgetown Town Council designated the current location of the market on Water Street, officially recognizing it as a market despite the fact that it had served such a capacity for quite some time. It was designed by American engineer Nathaniel McKay and built in 1880 and 1881 by the Edgemoor Iron Company of Delaware, USA. The market covers an area of about 80,000 square feet (7,000 m^{2}).

The iron structure and the prominent clock tower is reminiscent of the Victorian era of Great Britain (see British colonization of Guyana for more information).

== Market ==
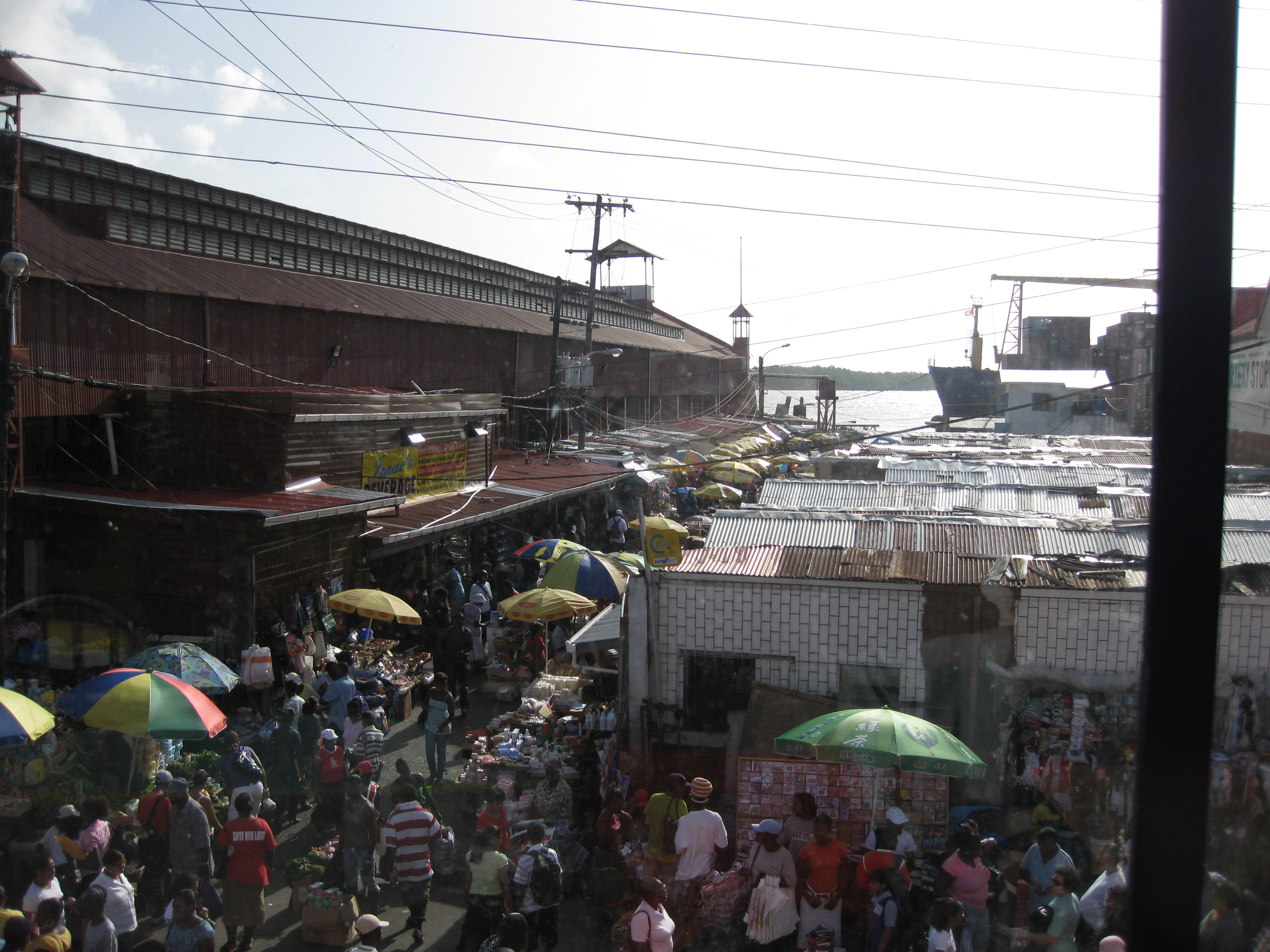
Stabroek Market.

The Stabroek Market area is easily the busiest such place in the city, always bustling with people and activity. It is a central hub for taxis and "minibuses", and also for ferries that transport people and goods from all towns and villages along the Demerara River.

Stabroek Market is widely known as the biggest market location in Guyana, where many sellers go to make a living. The market has attracted a great variety of business owners, whose wares range from jewelry to clothes to produce. Stabroek Market is filled with customers every day and is known for its clock located at the top of the building.

Stabroek Market is located in the middle of what Guyanese people call "Town", where many other major businesses surround its tall and recognized building. Stabroek Market is one of Georgetown's main attractions and is renowned throughout Guyana.

== Crime ==
Stabroek Market is generally not a high crime area, but robberies do occur from time to time. In 2011, a grenade attack at Stabroek Market killed one person and injured several others.
