= Georgetown, Guyana =

Capital of Guyana

Georgetown
- Capital city
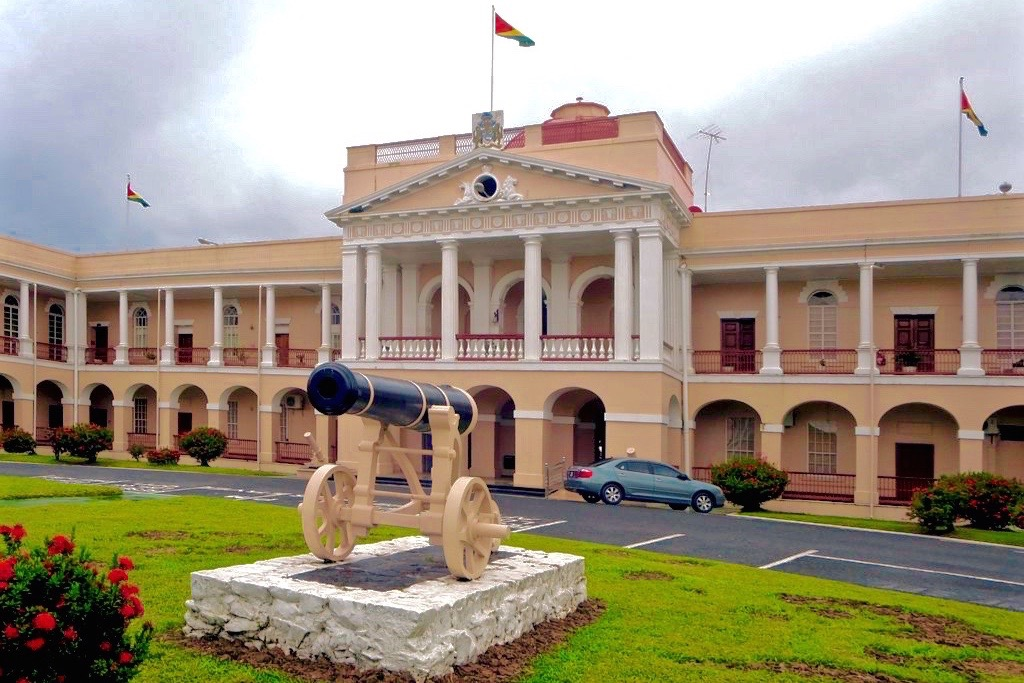
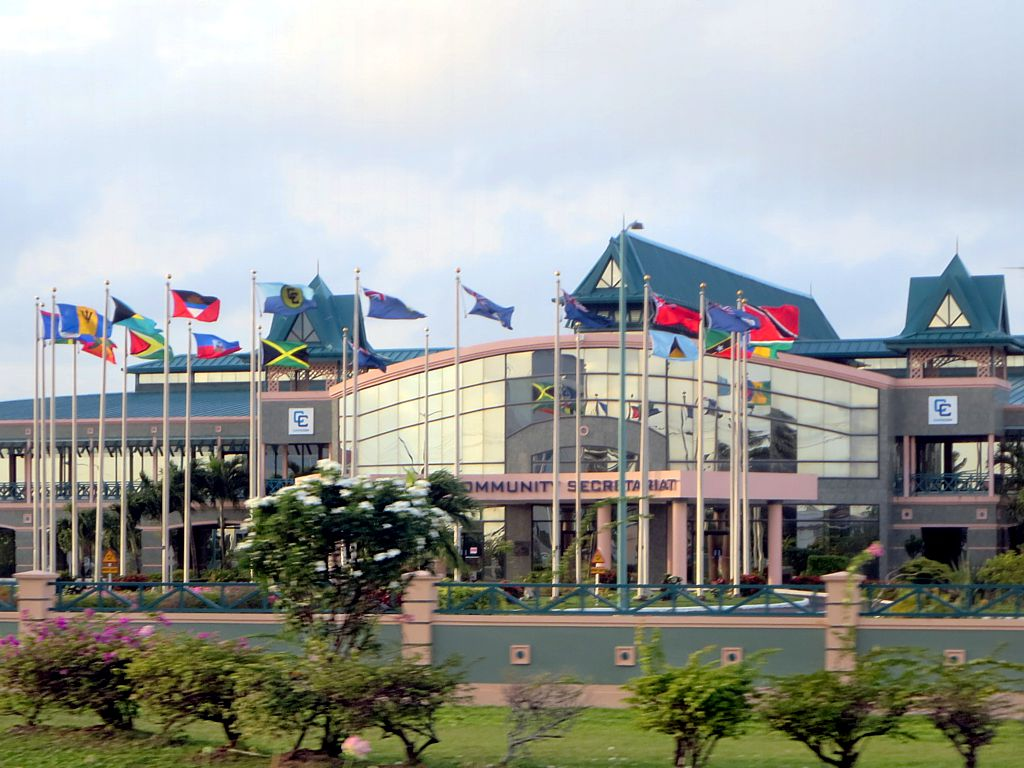
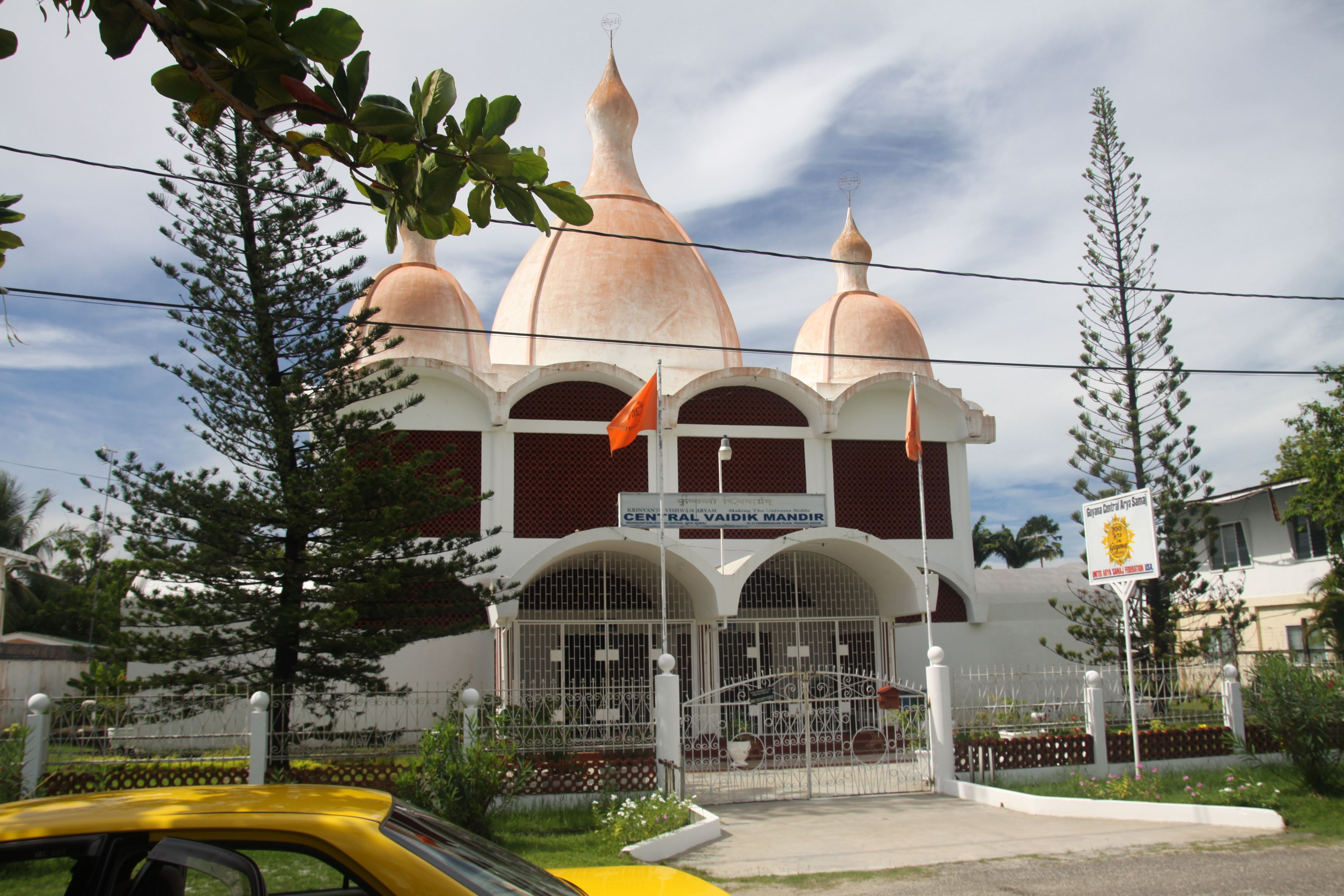
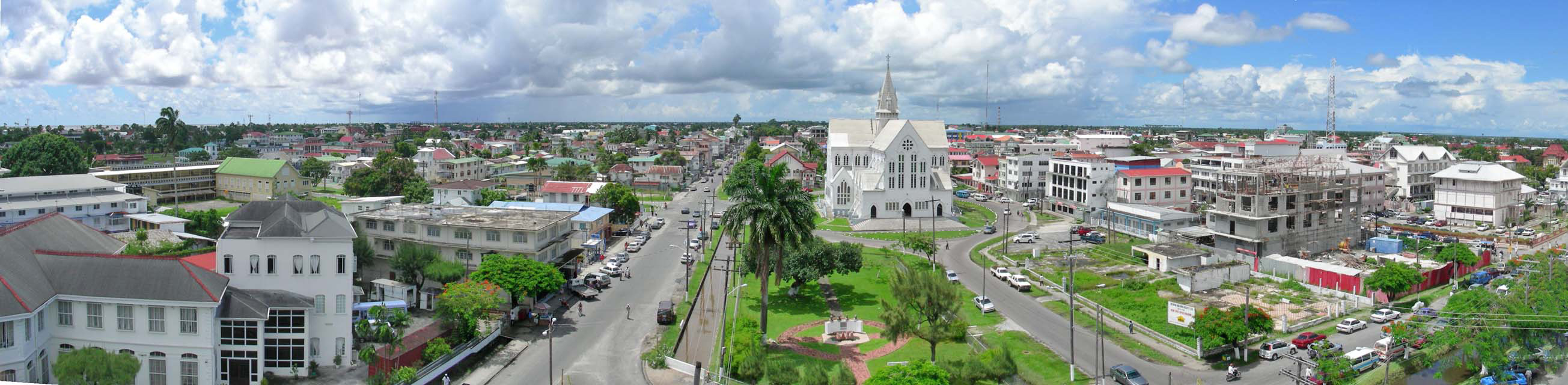
- Guyana Parliament Building CARICOM Headquarters Central Vaidik Mandir Georgetown Overview

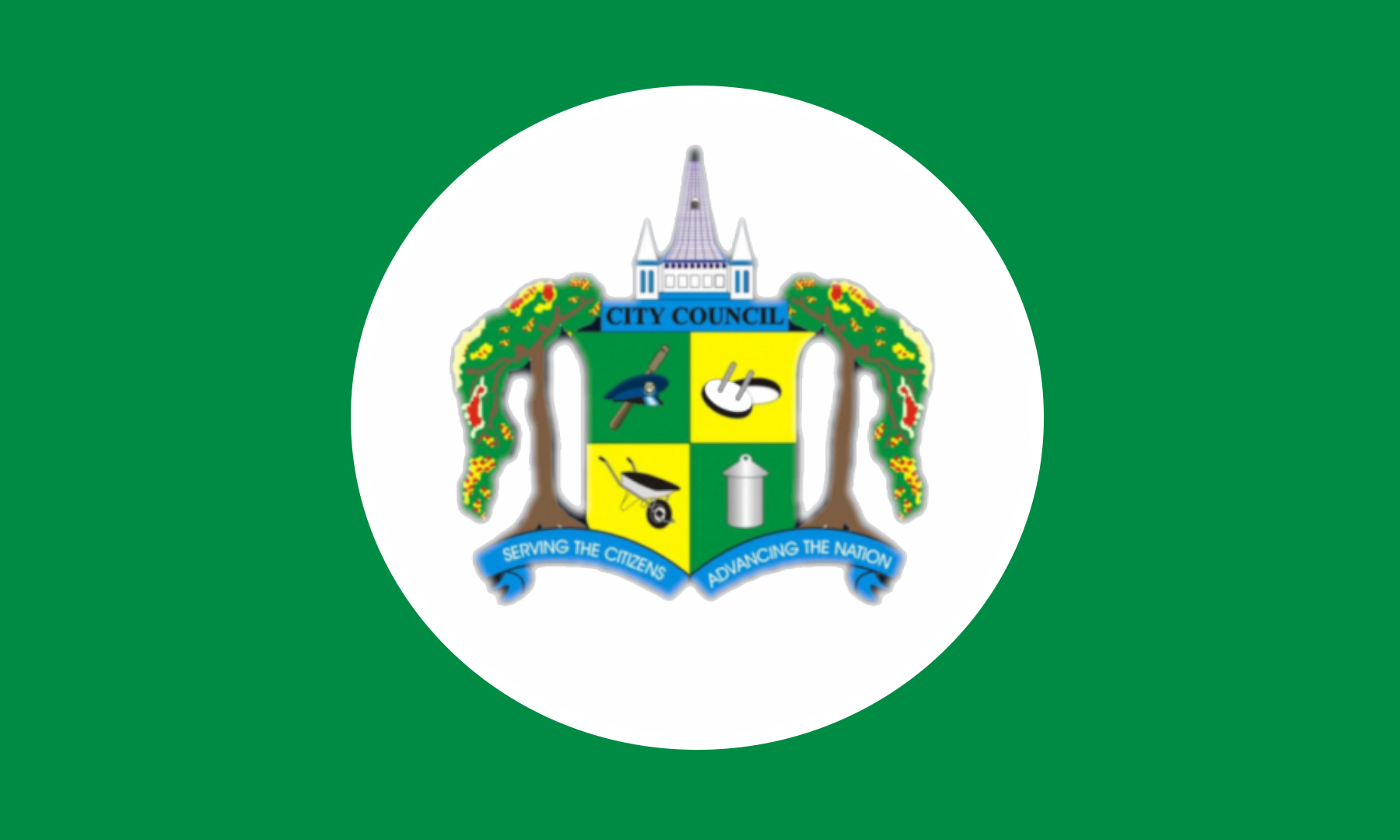
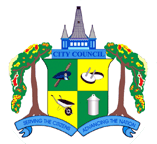
- Flag Seal
- Nickname: Garden City of the Caribbean
- Location within Guyana Location within South America
- Coordinates: 6°48′04″N 58°09′18″W
- Country: Guyana
- Region: Demerara-Mahaica
- Established: 1781
- Named: 29 April 1812

Government
  - Type: Mayor-Council
  - Mayor: Alfred Mentore

Area
  - Total: 37 km^{2} (14 sq mi)
- Elevation: 0 m (0 ft)

Population (2022 census)
  - Total: 125,683
  - Rank: 1st
  - Density: 3,400/km^{2} (8,800/sq mi)
- Time zone: UTC-04:00 (GYT)
- Climate: Af

Georgetown is the capital and largest city of Guyana. It is situated in Demerara-Mahaica, region 4, on the Atlantic Ocean coast, at the mouth of the Demerara River. It is nicknamed the "Garden City of the Caribbean". It is the retail, administrative, and financial services centre of the country, and the city accounts for a large portion of Guyana's GDP. The city recorded a population of 125,683 as of 2022 census.

All executive departments of Guyana's government are located in the city, including Parliament Building, Guyana's Legislative Building and the Court of Appeals, Guyana's highest judicial court. The State House (the official residence of the head of state), as well as the offices and residence of the head of government, are both located in the city. The Secretariat of the international organization known as the Caribbean Community (CARICOM), with 15 member-states and five associate partners, is also based in Georgetown.

Georgetown is also known for its British and Dutch colonial influenced architecture, including the tall painted-timber St. George's Cathedral and the iconic Stabroek Market.

== History ==
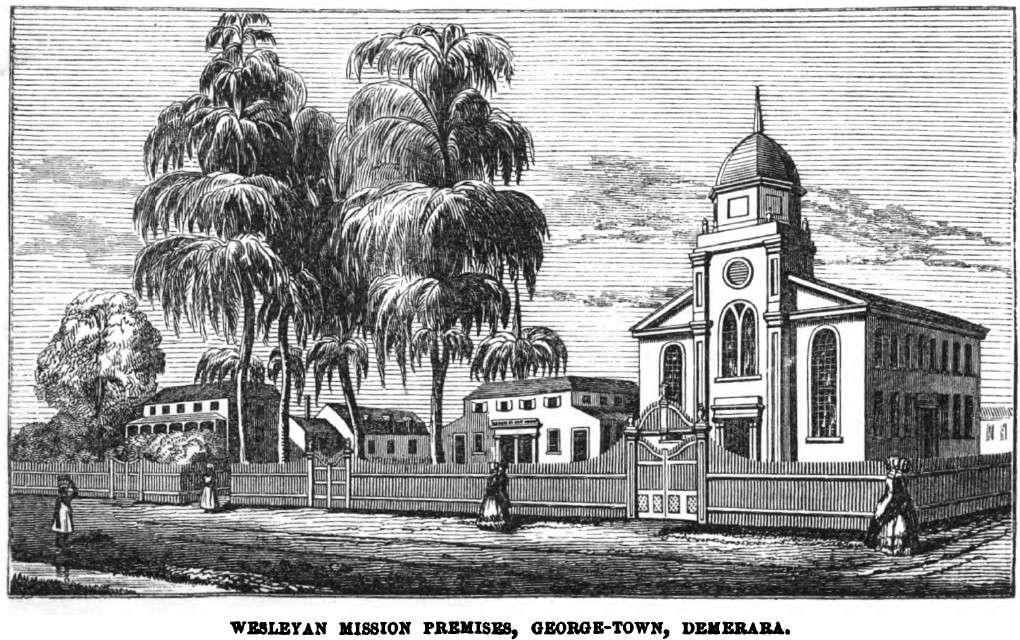
Wesleyan Mission Premises, George-Town, Demerara (1850)

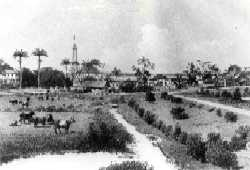
A view of the Kingston section of Georgetown in the 19th century.

In 1748, Governor Laurens Storm van 's Gravesande built a guard post at the mouth of the Demerara River. Later English planters started to build houses around the guard post creating a little village. The town was established in 1782 during a brief occupation by the French of the Dutch colony of Demerara. The original name of Longchamps was changed to Stabroek in 1784, after Nicholaas Geelvinck (1732 — 1787), Lord of Stabroek, the then President of the Dutch West India Company.

In 1789, the population was 780 people of which 239 were whites, however the town rapidly started to grow and by 1807 had a population of around 8,500 people. American traders started to build a wharf which became known as American Stelling, and little towns started to appear around the main settlement.

The city's name changed again in 1812 when, under British rule, it became Georgetown, in honour of King George III. A ward of the city, one fourth of a mile broad and one mile long, retains the name Stabroek.

Georgetown gained official city status on 24 August 1842 during the reign of Queen Victoria.

Luke M. Hill stated that Lacytown was named after, George Lacy, who was related to the family of General Sir George de Lacy Evans GCB, a Crimean war hero.

In 1945, a large fire (The Great Fire) broke out in the city, causing widespread damage.

== Geography ==
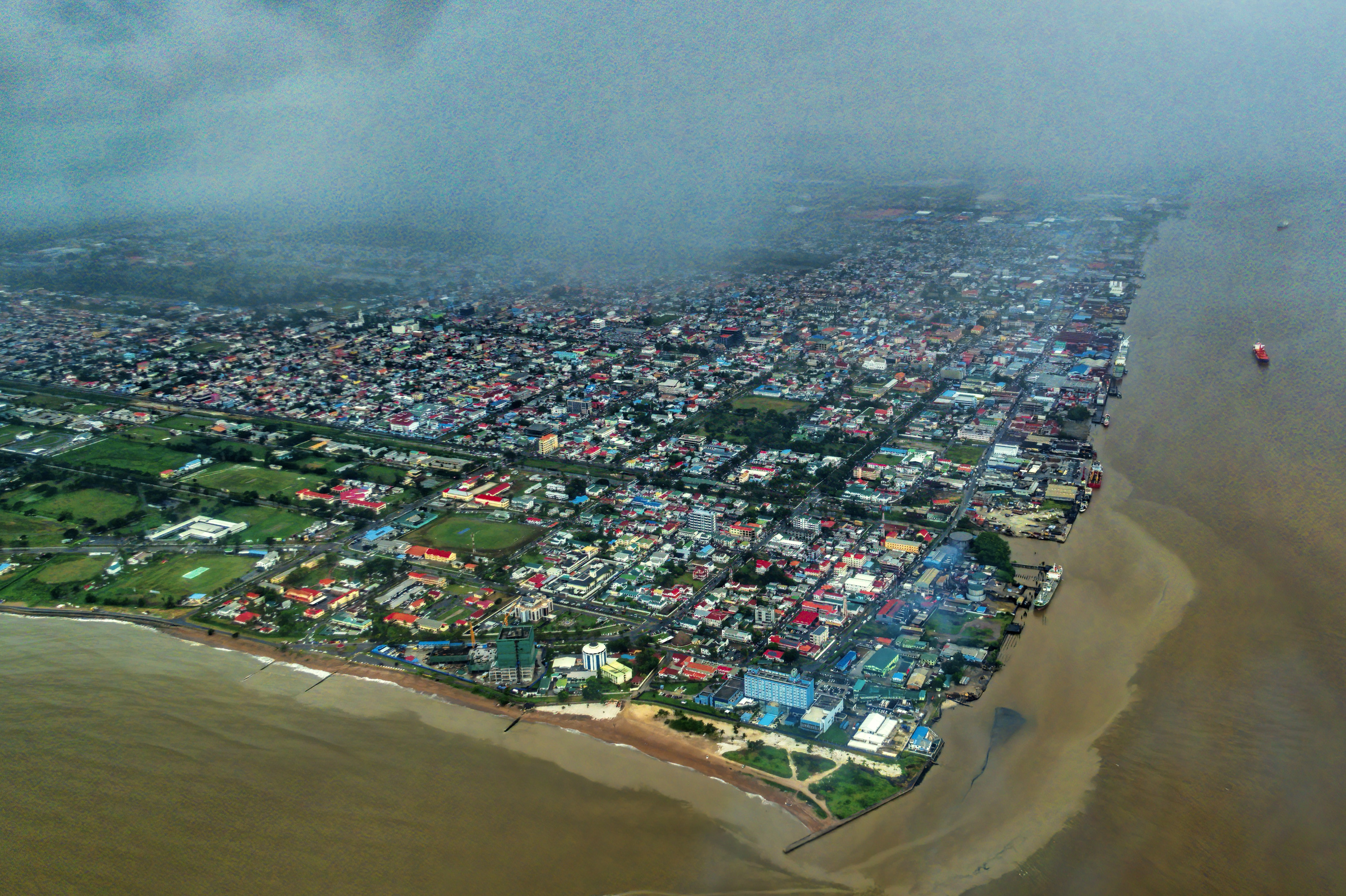
View of Georgetown from over the Atlantic Ocean

Georgetown is located on Guyana's Atlantic coast on the east bank of Demerara River estuary. The terrain in this part of the country where the city is located is flat coastal plains. The city is surrounded by a blanket of cane fields along with marshy swamps, and savannah lands on its east and south. The elevation of the land is as low as 2 m (6 ft) below the high tide level. This low elevation is protected by a retaining wall known as the seawall to keep the ocean out and an innovative network of canals with kokers to drain the city of excess water.

=== Climate ===
Georgetown has a year-round hot trade-wind tropical rainforest climate (Af). Relative humidity fluctuates throughout the year with the highest occurring in May, June, August and December–January; these months are usually the rainiest part of the year. Between the months of September to November relative humidity is lower ushering in the drier season.

Georgetown does not truly have a dry season – monthly precipitation in all 12 months is above 60 mm (2.4 in). Because of its location Georgetown's temperatures are moderated by the North-East trade winds blowing in from the North Atlantic and so it rarely sees temperatures above 31 degrees Celsius.

Climate data for Georgetown (Guyana Botanical Gardens) (1991–2020)
Month	Jan	Feb	Mar	Apr	May	Jun	Jul	Aug	Sep	Oct	Nov	Dec	Year
Record high °C (°F)	32.2 (90.0)	32.5 (90.5)	34.4 (93.9)	33.0 (91.4)	33.4 (92.1)	32.7 (90.9)	32.5 (90.5)	33.8 (92.8)	34.4 (93.9)	34.0 (93.2)	33.3 (91.9)	33.4 (92.1)	34.4 (93.9)
Mean daily maximum °C (°F)	29.6 (85.3)	29.9 (85.8)	30.9 (87.6)	30.5 (86.9)	30.2 (86.4)	30.2 (86.4)	30.2 (86.4)	31.0 (87.8)	31.3 (88.3)	31.6 (88.9)	31.1 (88.0)	30.0 (86.0)	30.5 (86.9)
Daily mean °C (°F)	26.6 (79.9)	26.8 (80.2)	27.2 (81.0)	27.5 (81.5)	27.3 (81.1)	27.0 (80.6)	27.1 (80.8)	27.6 (81.7)	28.1 (82.6)	28.2 (82.8)	27.7 (81.9)	27.0 (80.6)	27.3 (81.1)
Mean daily minimum °C (°F)	22.9 (73.2)	22.9 (73.2)	21.8 (71.2)	23.4 (74.1)	23.6 (74.5)	22.9 (73.2)	22.4 (72.3)	23.2 (73.8)	23.0 (73.4)	21.8 (71.2)	23.2 (73.8)	23.3 (73.9)	22.9 (73.2)
Record low °C (°F)	20.3 (68.5)	20.6 (69.1)	20.2 (68.4)	18.5 (65.3)	19.9 (67.8)	20.2 (68.4)	19.5 (67.1)	20.1 (68.2)	19.5 (67.1)	19.4 (66.9)	20.0 (68.0)	20.5 (68.9)	18.5 (65.3)
Average precipitation mm (inches)	238.9 (9.41)	126.7 (4.99)	100.2 (3.94)	142.0 (5.59)	287.0 (11.30)	303.1 (11.93)	281.8 (11.09)	166.9 (6.57)	92.2 (3.63)	69.2 (2.72)	196.8 (7.75)	276.3 (10.88)	2,281.1 (89.81)
Average precipitation days (≥ 1.0 mm)	15	12	10	11	19	22	21	14	7	8	12	19	169.0
Mean monthly sunshine hours	206.8	201.4	233.8	209.4	173.9	165.8	198.7	242.0	247.0	247.4	209.5	195.7	2,531.4
Source: NOAA

Climate data for Cheddi Jagan Airport (1991–2020)
Month	Jan	Feb	Mar	Apr	May	Jun	Jul	Aug	Sep	Oct	Nov	Dec	Year
Mean daily maximum °C (°F)	30.2 (86.4)	30.5 (86.9)	31.2 (88.2)	31.5 (88.7)	30.9 (87.6)	30.8 (87.4)	31.3 (88.3)	32.2 (90.0)	33.0 (91.4)	33.0 (91.4)	32.1 (89.8)	30.8 (87.4)	31.5 (88.6)
Daily mean °C (°F)	25.8 (78.4)	25.8 (78.4)	26.4 (79.5)	26.9 (80.4)	26.9 (80.4)	26.7 (80.1)	26.8 (80.2)	27.3 (81.1)	27.7 (81.9)	27.7 (81.9)	27.2 (81.0)	26.4 (79.5)	26.8 (80.2)
Mean daily minimum °C (°F)	21.3 (70.3)	21.1 (70.0)	21.4 (70.5)	22.2 (72.0)	22.8 (73.0)	22.6 (72.7)	22.4 (72.3)	22.4 (72.3)	22.4 (72.3)	22.4 (72.3)	22.3 (72.1)	22.0 (71.6)	22.1 (71.8)
Average precipitation mm (inches)	227.2 (8.94)	138.1 (5.44)	113.7 (4.48)	189.9 (7.48)	341.1 (13.43)	357.5 (14.07)	297.8 (11.72)	228.8 (9.01)	149.5 (5.89)	135 (5.3)	193.2 (7.61)	267.4 (10.53)	2,639.2 (103.9)
Average precipitation days (≥ 1.0 mm)	17	13	11	12	21	21	23	17	11	10	14	20	190
Mean monthly sunshine hours	174.6	170.8	197.1	184.7	155	139.2	186.3	218.7	216.7	214.9	186.3	156.1	2,200.4
Source: NOAA NCEI

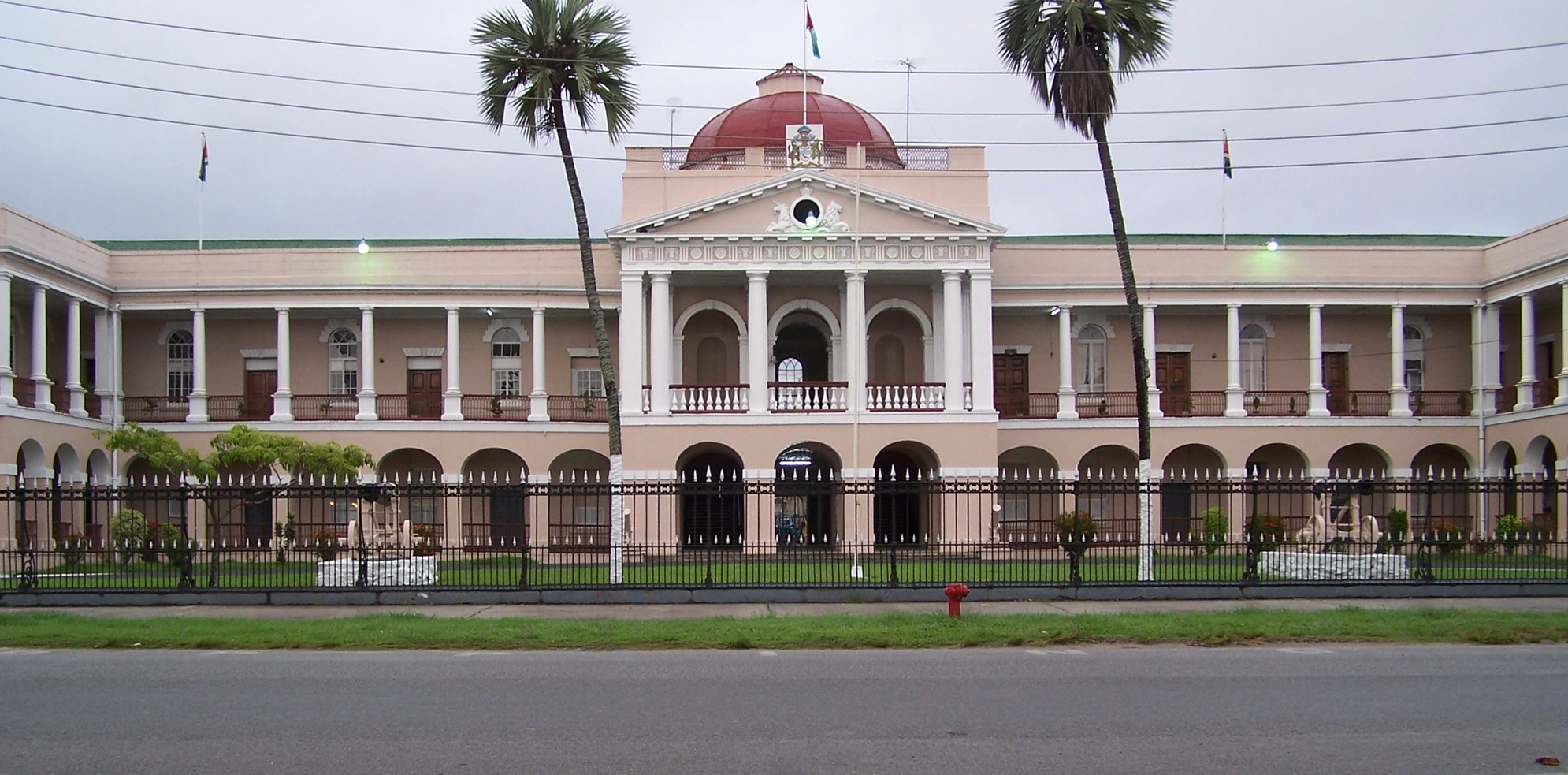
Parliament Building

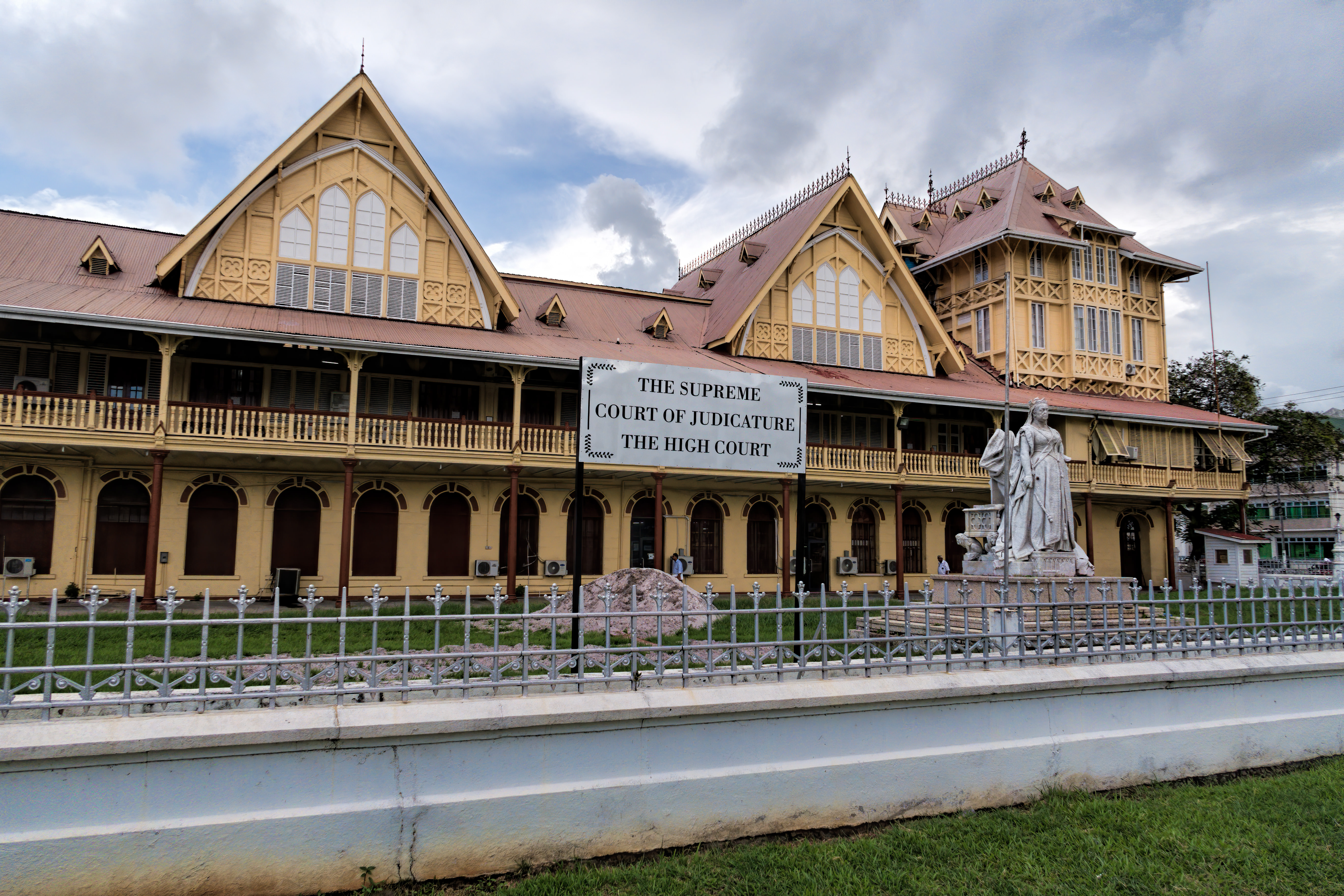
The High Court

== Transportation ==
=== Air ===
The Cheddi Jagan International Airport (formerly Timehri Airport) acts as the major air transportation hub for the city, which is located on the right bank of the Demerara River, 41 kilometres south of Georgetown. Closer to the city is Eugene F. Correia International Airport (formerly Ogle Airport), with a terminal facility geared to handle regional, international and inter-Caricom flights, connecting CARICOM states with the CARICOM Secretariat. Helicopters also use this airport for the support of offshore oil and gas exploration activities.

=== Land ===
The country's first four-lane East Coast Highway was completed in 2005. Since then, development has occurred throughout the city, with countless new roads and avenues developed. The Heroes Highway was commissioned in 2022 and eased traffic congestion on the East Bank of Demerara. This highway will connect Mandela Avenue to the Soesdyke-Linden Highway.

Georgetown is served by private buses and taxis. The Demerara Harbour Bridge was the city's major crossing point into neighbouring Region 3 until the 5 October 2025 commissioning of the Bharrat Jagdeo Demerara River Bridge.

=== Water ===
Georgetown also is home to a seaport. The Demerara River is navigable by oceangoing vessels up to roughly 100 km upriver.

== Demographics ==
Georgetown recorded a population of 118,363 in the 2012 Guyanese census, down 12 percent from the 134,497 people counted in the 2002 census. In 2002, about 70,962 (53%) listed themselves as Black/African; 31,902 (24%) as mixed; 26,542 (20%) as East Indian; 1,441 (1.1%) as Amerindian; 1,075 (0.8%) as Portuguese; 475 (0.35%) as Chinese; 2,265 (1.7%) as "don't know/not stated"; 196 (0.15%) as white not of Portuguese descent; 35 as "other".

== Points of interest ==
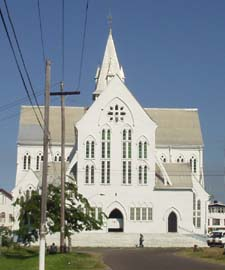
St. George's Anglican Cathedral

Georgetown is laid out in a north–south, east–west grid, interlaced with canals protected by kokers (sluices), built by the Dutch and later the British that provide drainage to a city that lies 0.91 m (3 ft) below high-tide level. A long seawall helps prevent flooding. The city has numerous boulevards and contains many wooden colonial buildings and markets.

Most of the main buildings are centred around the western region of the town. Around the western-central area is Independence Square and Promenade Gardens, the Walter Roth Museum of Anthropology, the National Library (built by Andrew Carnegie), the Bank of Guyana, Company Path Garden, the National Museum of Guyana and State House (built 1852) where the president resides, St. George's Anglican Cathedral and the Red House.

The Georgetown Cenotaph, at Main and Church Streets, was built in 1923. It is the site of Remembrance Day (Remembrance Sunday) services in November each year.

To the south of this region is where the neo-Gothic City Hall (1889) is to be found, as well as the Victoria Law Courts (1887), the Parliament Building (1829–1834), the large Stabroek Market (1792) containing the prominent cast-iron clock tower that dominates the city sky line, the Roman Catholic Brickdam Cathedral, City Engineer House, the Magistrate's Court, St. Andrew's Kirk (1818) and Independence Arch.

The northern area of the city near the Atlantic coast contains Splashmins Fun Park, Fort William Frederick, a park and the Umana Yana, a conical thatched building built by Wai-Wai Amerindians using traditional techniques. It was built for the 1972 Non-Aligned Foreign Ministers Conference. The Umana Yana burnt down in 2010 but was rebuilt in 2016. The Georgetown Lighthouse is a famous landmark.

The Guyana National Park is an urban park in the city. More inland, surrounded by residential neighbourhoods are the Guyana Zoo, Botanical Gardens and Castellani House. The Botanical Garden, in addition to a variety of plants, also features a manatee pond, as well as other enclosures housing felines such as jaguars, lynxes, or bobcats. The city's suburbs are also home to the Museum of African Heritage located in Bel Air Park.

Among these key points of interest is Texila American University – Guyana Campus, located in Providence just outside the city. The university offers top-tier programs in medicine, public health and management attracting students from across the Caribbean and beyond.

== Sports ==
Georgetown hosted the CaribeBasket, the top international basketball tournament for countries in the Caribbean in 1981, 1988 and 1994.

== Performing arts ==
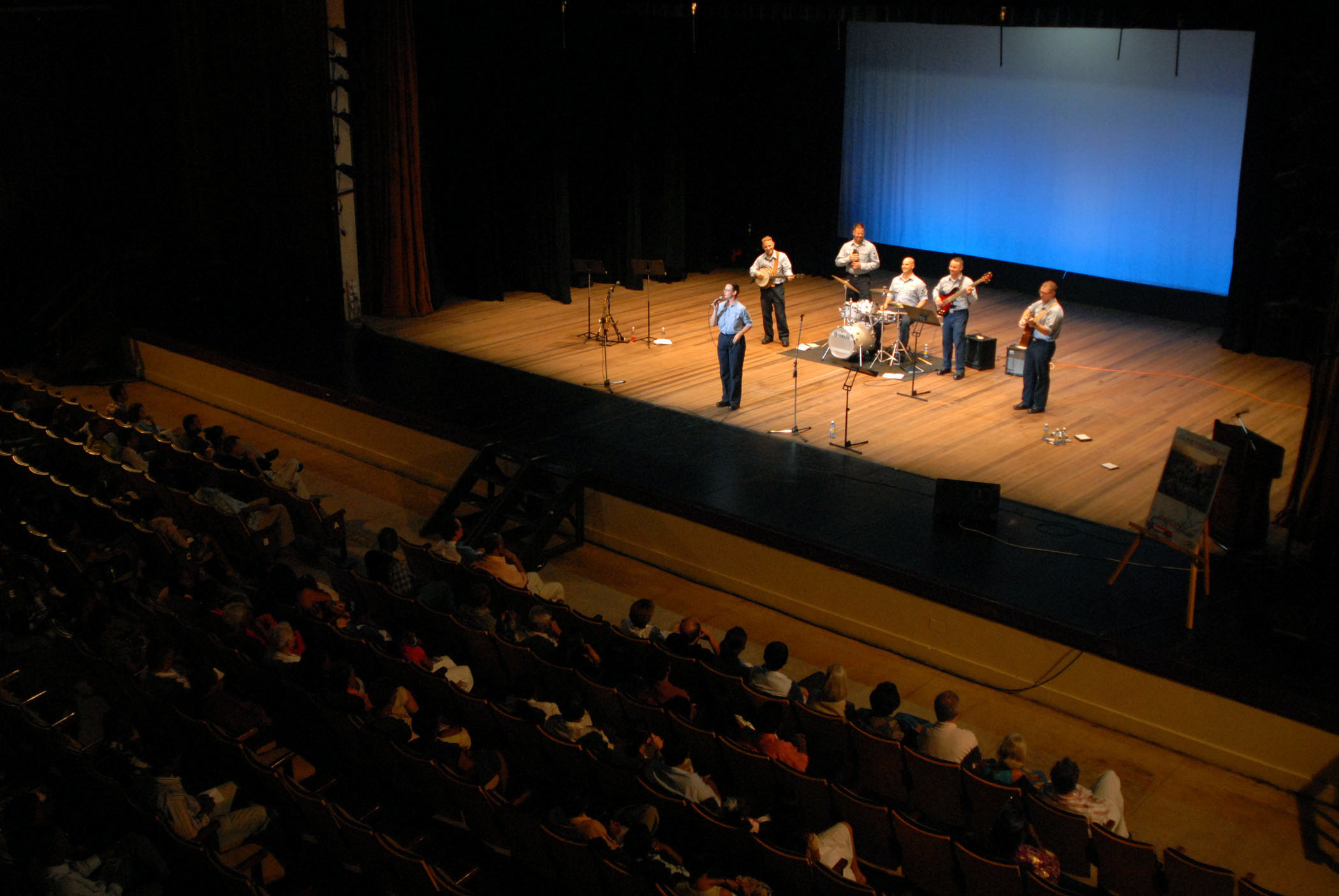
National Cultural Centre auditorium

Georgetown's theatre scene is dominantly concentrated on the stages of the National Cultural Centre. Plays are also staged at the theatre guild of Guyana. This is the oldest theatrical performance facility in Guyana. It was opened in 1957 and restored in 2007.

== Neighbourhoods ==
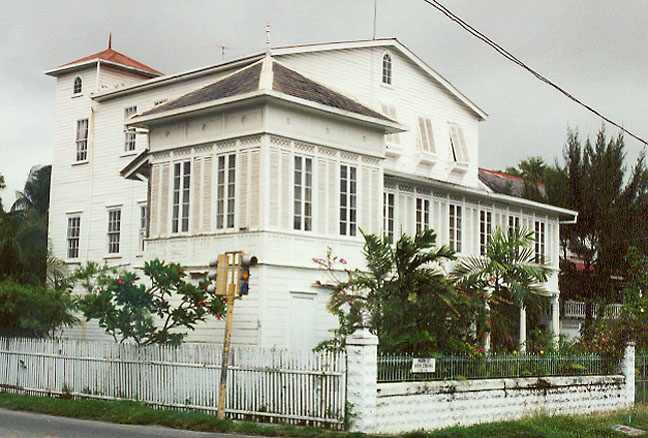
A Colonial era residence in Georgetown.

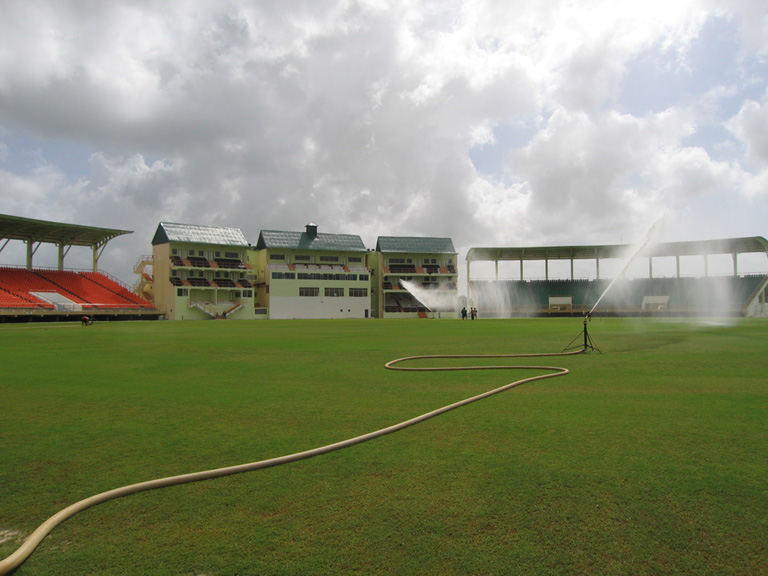
Providence Stadium hosted several 2007 Cricket World Cup matches, replacing Bourda as the national stadium and test venue

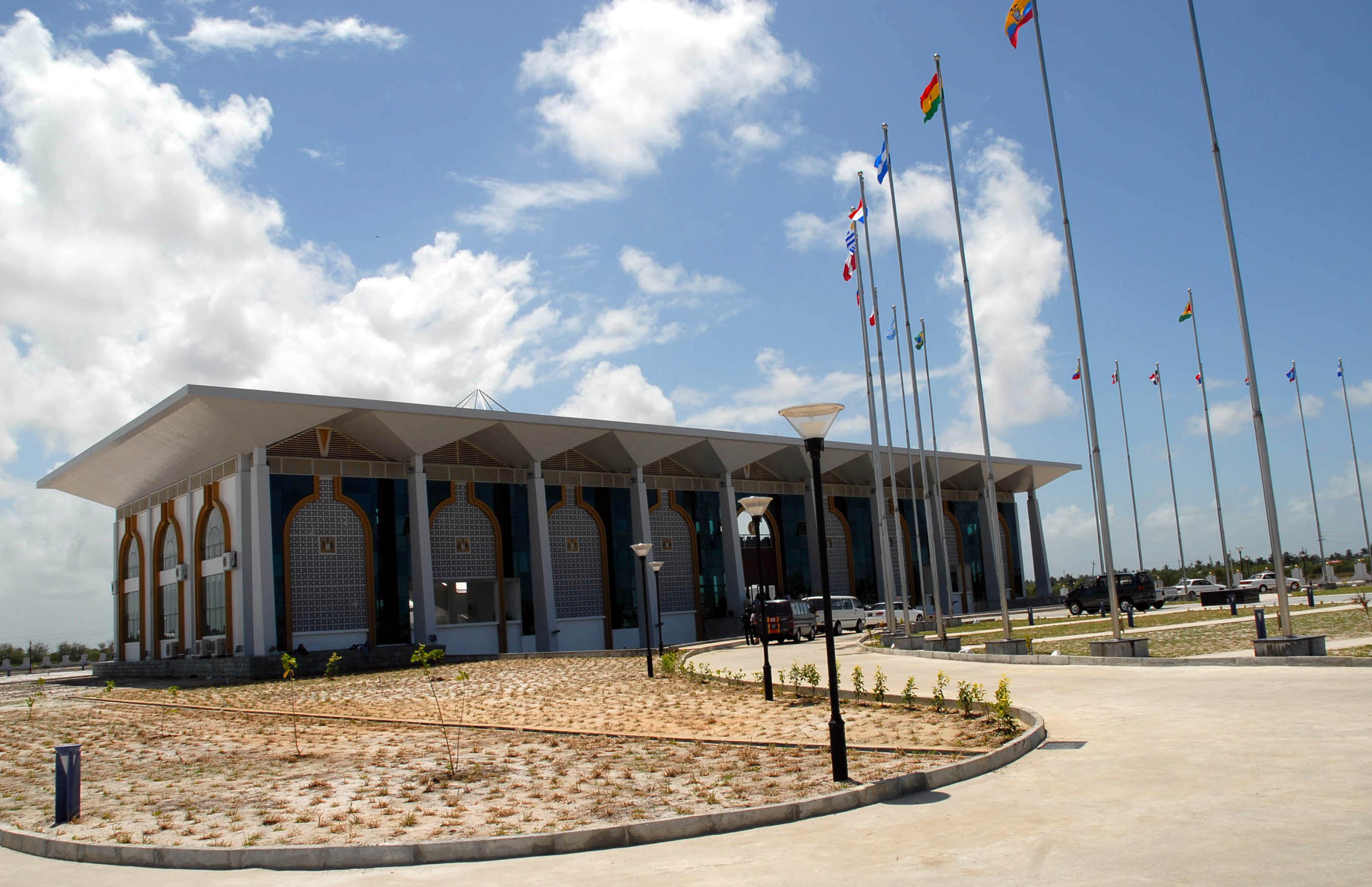
The International Conference Centre

=== Central Georgetown ===
The central city includes the business district as well as the seat of the national government.

=== Greater Georgetown ===
Northeastern Georgetown also has many significant business headquarters, such as for University of Guyana, Guyana Sugar Corporation, and the CARICOM Secretariat. Also here are The Cyril Potter College of Education, Guyana International Conference Centre, and Eugene F. Correia International Airport.

This area also has a number of exclusive gated communities. Bel Air Park, Bel Air Gardens, Lamaha Gardens and Bel Air Springs are well known ultimately as high income neighbourhoods. While Meadow Brook Gardens, Subryanville and South Ruimveldt Gardens are High-Middle Income communities.

North of Georgetown lies Main Street, where the head of state's official residence as well as the Ministry of Finance. East of Georgetown stretches towards the Avenue of the Republic, where Georgetown's city hall building is located, and St. George's Cathedral. Also on the east side is Brickdam, which is the single most concentrated area of executive departments and agencies. The Ministries of Health, Education, Home Affairs, Housing and Water are all located on Brickdam.

West of Stabroek Market is the Port of Georgetown, the largest and busiest shipping point in Guyana. Stabroek Market itself contains the Ministry of Labour as well as the Ministry of Human Services and Social Security. It is also the host facility for the equally famous Stabroek markets. Regent Street is considered Georgetown's premier shopping district and Sheriff Street is the main entertainment area containing most of the city's clubs, bars and restaurants.

=== South Georgetown ===
The south end incorporates communities of neighbourhoods along the eastern bank of the Demerara River such as Sophia, Roxanne Burnham Gardens, Albouystown, and Agricola. Those are well known and highly regarded poor areas of the city. Some areas such as Houston Estates, Ruimvelt and Thirst Park have retained high levels of affluence.

== Crime ==
Armed robberies occur regularly in Georgetown, especially in businesses and shopping districts. Particularly high crime areas of Georgetown include Tiger Bay, Albouystown, Sophia, and Agricola. Pickpocketing is a daily occurrence in the Stabroek Market area.

== Utilities ==
Power is supplied by the state-owned and controlled Guyana Power and Light. Water supply and sanitation in Guyana is handled by state-owned Guyana Water Incorporated.

== Notable people ==
- John Agard (born 1949), poet
- Joy Ford Austin, non-profit executive and philanthropist, born in Georgetown
- John Meredith Ford (1923–1995), Lord Mayor of Georgetown
- Jane Phillips Gay – Trade Unionist and Recipient of the Order of Roraima of Guyana
- David A. Granger (born 1945), former President of Guyana
- R. B. Greaves (1943–2012), an American singer born in Georgetown
- Saint Jhn (born 1986), born Carlos St. John Phillips, American-born singer and rapper, raised between Brooklyn and Georgetown
- Wilson Harris (1921–2018), Guyanese writer
- Suchitra Mattai (born 1973), Guyanese-born American contemporary artist
- Manzoor Nadir (born 1955), former minister and current Speaker of the National Assembly
- Grace Nichols (born 1950) Guyanese poet
- Alwin Nurse (born 1982), singer also known as Negus Nurse
- CCH Pounder (born 1952), a Guyanese-American actress, born in Georgetown
- Walter Rodney (1942–1980), historian of Africa, born and assassinated in Georgetown
- John Rodriguez (1937–2017), former Canadian MP and Mayor of Sudbury
- Dušan Velkaverh (1943–2016), Slovenian lyricist, born in Georgetown
- Oneeka Williams (born 1966), Guyanese writer and surgeon
- Letitia Wright (born 1993), a Guyanese actress, born in Georgetown

=== Sport ===
- Julian Austin (born 1949), Olympic field-hockey player
- Sudesh Fitzgerald (born 1986), professional darts player, born in Georgetown
- Lance Gibbs (born 1934), former member of the West Indies cricket team
- Roger Harper (born 1963), former member of the West Indies cricket team
- Carl Hooper (born 1966), former member of the West Indies cricket team
- Donald Kayum (born 1955), cricketer
- Cyril Langevine (born 1998), Guyanese–American professional basketball center in the Israeli Basketball Premier League
- Clive Lloyd (born 1944), captain of the West Indies cricket team
- Thomas Moulder (1872–1920), cricketer
- Gudakesh Motie (born 1995), cricketer
- Neville Stanton (born 1975), footballer
- Oscar Weber (1871–1946), cricketer

== Twin towns – sister cities ==
Georgetown has several sister cities, including:

- – St. Louis, Missouri, United States
- – Port of Spain, Trinidad and Tobago

== Bibliography ==
- Netscher, Pieter Marinus (1888). Geschiedenis van de koloniën Essequebo, Demerary en Berbice, van de vestiging der Nederlanders aldaar tot op onzen tijd (in Dutch). The Hague: Martinus Nijhoff.
