= Neville Stanton =

Guyanese footballer

Personal information
- Date of birth: May 5, 1975 (age 51)
- Place of birth: Georgetown, Guyana
- Height: 6 ft 1 in (1.85 m)
- Position: Defender

Team information
- Current team: Fruta Conquerous FC

International career
Years	Team	Apps	(Gls)
2005–2012	Guyana		

Neville Stanton (born May 5, 1975) is a Guyanese footballer who has played for Fruta Conquerors and Guyana Defence Force as a defender. He has been capped by Guyana at international level.
