= Georgetown Lighthouse, Guyana =

Georgetown Lighthouse
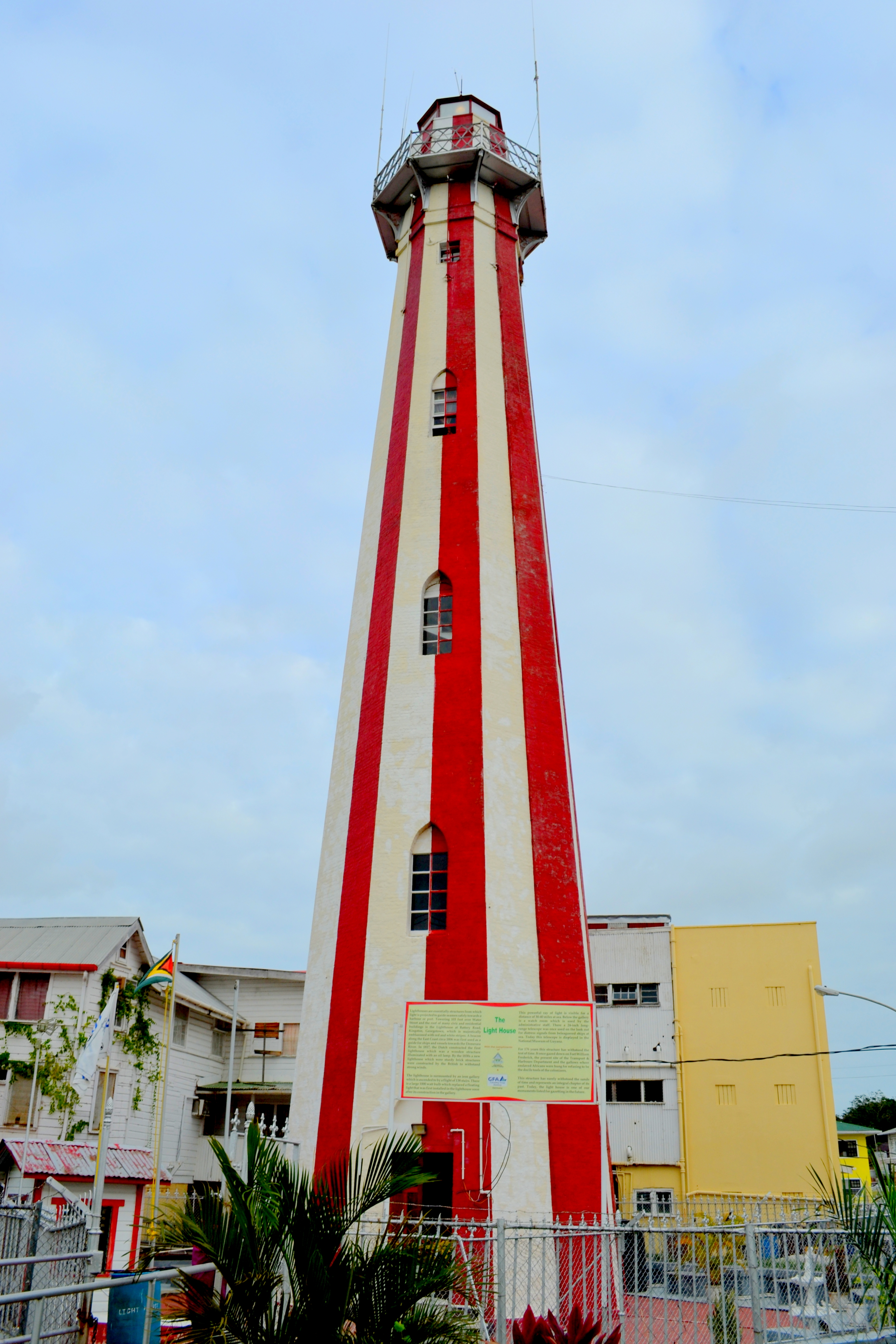
- Location: Water Street, Georgetown, Guyana
- Coordinates: 6.8236966°N 58.1643569°W

Tower
- Constructed: 1817 (first)
- Foundation: forty nine greenheart piles
- Construction: stone tower
- Automated: clockwork
- Height: 30 metres (98 ft)
- Shape: tapered octagonal tower with balcony and lantern
- Markings: red and white vertical stripes

Light
- First lit: 1830
- Focal height: 31.5 metres (103 ft)
- Characteristic: Flash every 60s, red or white depending on direction.

The Georgetown Lighthouse was first built by the Dutch in 1817 and then rebuilt in 1830. The Lighthouse, located on Water Street, is maintained by the National Trust of Guyana. You must climb 138 stairs to access the balcony.
