= Leonard Fryer (designer) =

British artist, stamp and banknote designer

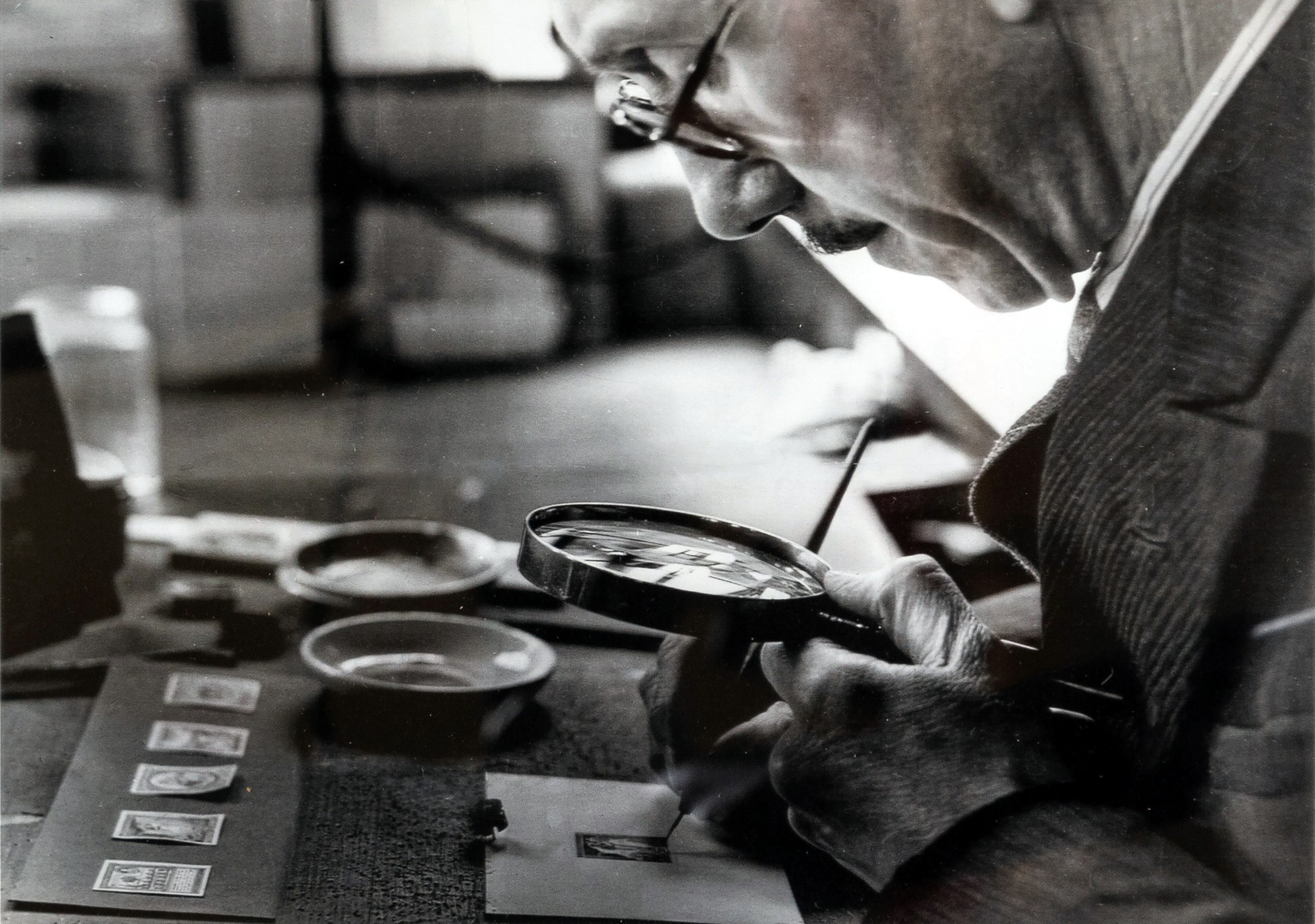
- Fryer at work
- Born: Leonard Douglas Fryer; 1891; Plaistow, England
- Died: 16 November 1965 (aged 73–74); Ilford, England
- Occupations: Artist and designer
- Years active: c.1906 – c.1960
- Known for: Stamp and banknote designs for Waterlow and Sons

Leonard Douglas Fryer (1891 – 16 November 1965) was a British artist and designer. The son of a steel engraver, he worked for the printers Waterlow and Sons, preparing proposed designs for material to be produced by the firm such as stamps and banknotes. In 2019, a collection of his watercolour paintings for stamp and banknote designs was sold at auction after being found in a wardrobe 40 years after his death.

== Early life and family ==
Leonard Fryer was born in Plaistow, West Ham, Essex, in 1891 to Augustus Frederick Fryer, a steel engraver, and his wife Emma. Augustus Fryer worked for Waterlow and Sons as a stamp engraver. He died on 30 December 1935 leaving £161, probate being granted in 1936 to his son Leonard, described as a "draughtsman".

Leonard Fryer married Pauline V. Welling in West Ham in 1917.

== Career ==
=== Waterlow and Sons ===
Artwork for a proposed design for a 2d stamp for King George V's 1935 Silver Jubilee attributed to Leonard Fryer. (not adopted)

Fryer joined the printers Waterlow and Sons in 1906 and worked there until his retirement around 1960, producing proposed designs for material to be printed by the firm such as banknotes and stamps, for the British Commonwealth and South and Central American countries with whom Waterlow had a large business. He also produced designs for European and Middle East countries.

As the earliest part of the stamp production process, Fryer's proposed designs were subject to change. Some were rejected completely such as his design for the 1948 stamp to mark the liberation of the Channel Islands, the contract for which went to Harrison and Sons, while others were printed in different colours, at different values, or with design changes. The British Guiana stamp of 1934 showing Stabroek Market, for instance, was originally designed as a $1 stamp in purple but printed as a 12c stamp in orange.

Working in watercolour with the aid of a magnifying glass, Fryer produced a stamp-sized impression of the proposed design. If approved, a larger original was created at a higher level of detail that formed the final artwork from which the stamp would be printed. Often this was by the recess method from a steel engraving as with the British Guiana 12c but other printing methods used included typography as was used for the 1943 Belgian Congo postage due stamps which were produced in five different values and colours to a common design by Fryer.

=== Issued stamps based on designs attributed to Leonard Fryer ===
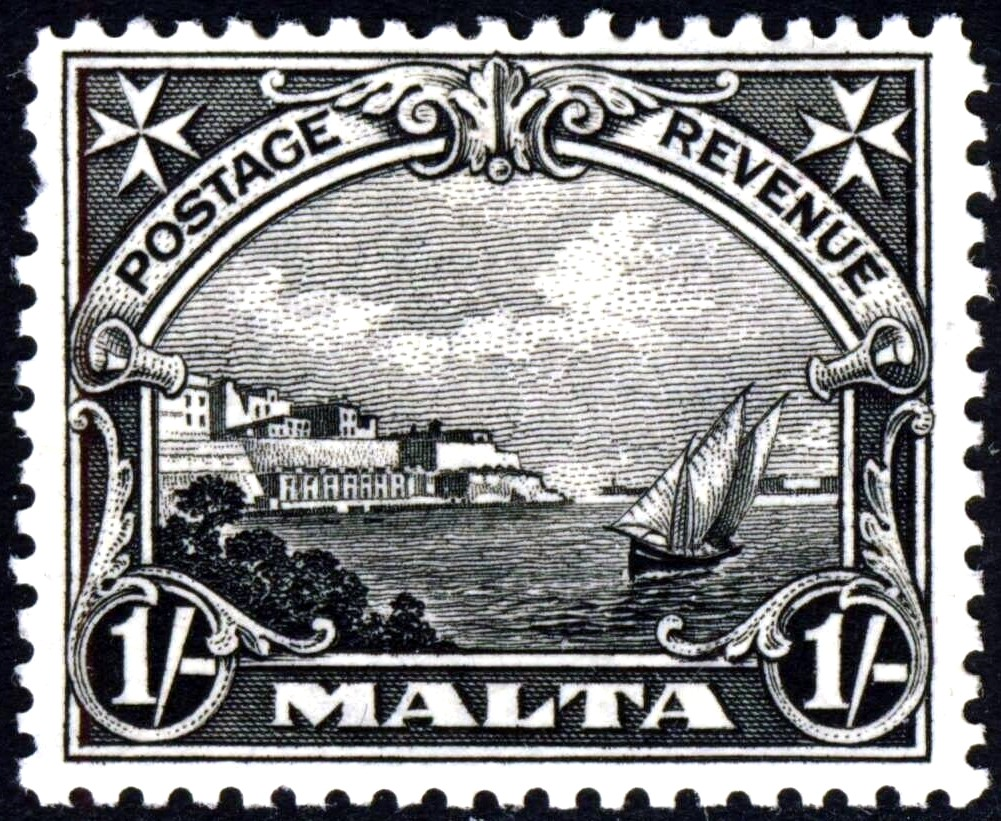
1926 1 shilling stamp of Malta

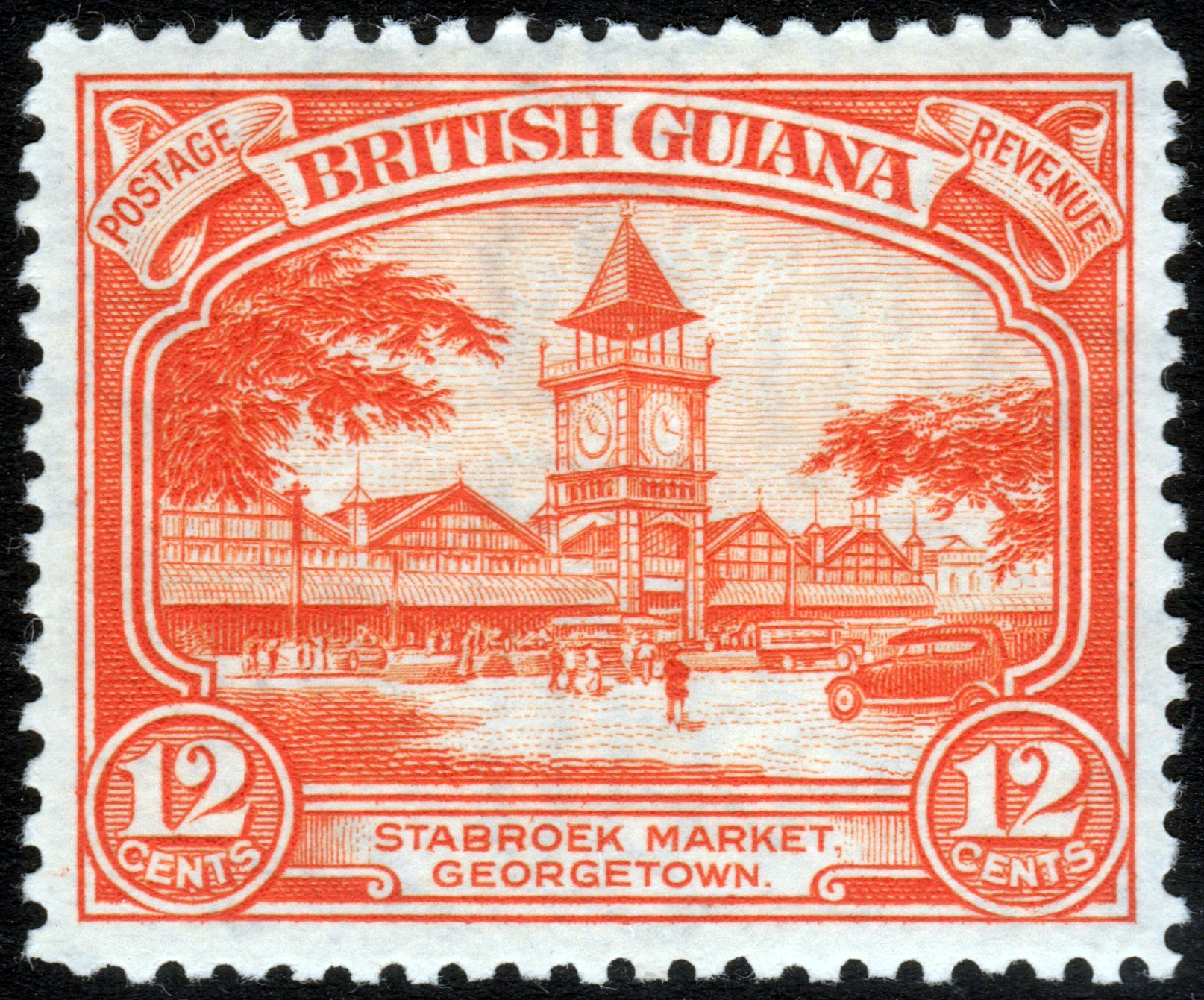
1934 12c stamp of British Guiana

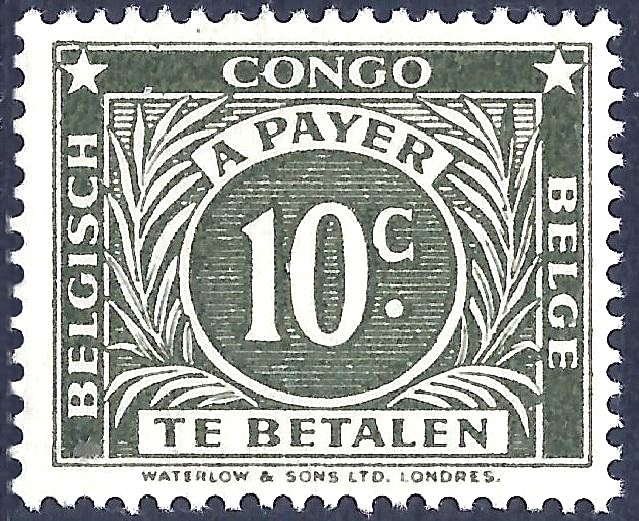
1943 10c postage due stamp of Belgian Congo

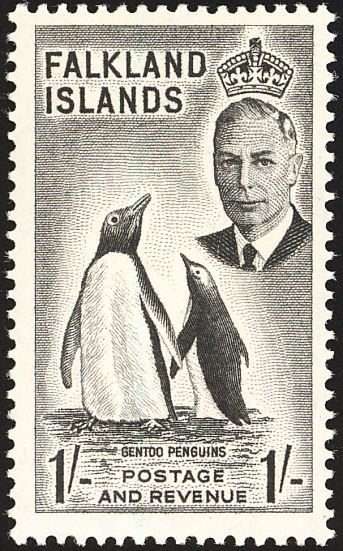
1952 1 shilling stamp of the Falkland Islands

=== Freelance work ===
Fryer also worked freelance as shown by a c. 1910–20 calling card describing him as the designer of "Ornament Bookplates Vignettes" at his "private studio" at 18 Cheapside in the City of London. In 1957 he was trading as Fryer and Scott when he submitted an invoice for expenses incurred in a visit to the Austrian State Bank Note Printing Works.

== Death and legacy ==
Leonard Fryer died on 16 November 1965 on the way to the King George Hospital, Ilford. His residence at the time of his death was 11 Clarence Avenue, Ilford. Probate was granted to Leonard Marcus Fryer, a photolitho retoucher, on an estate of £2,128.

In May 2019, a collection of his watercolour paintings for 270 stamps and 40 banknotes from the 1920s to the 1960s was sold by Hansons Auctioneers in Derbyshire. It was found in a wardrobe in Redbridge, Ilford, at the home of Pauline Fryer, a fashion designer who died in 2005, and sold by Leonard Fryer's granddaughters Dianne Fryer, a former graphic designer, and her sister Jan Bullock.

Among the highest realisations were two Malta lots; 12 designs for the 1926 definitive issue, and another 10 for the King George VI 1938–1943 definitive issue, that realised £22,100 and £5,700 respectively. The auction included items from Fryer's father Augustus as well as material for designs attributed in stamp catalogues to others such as Harold Nelson's 1924 British Empire Exhibition stamp and 1952 stamps of the Falkland Islands showing sheep, a Magellan goose, and Gentoo penguins for which Fryer worked from sketches by V. Spencer, thus showing that Fryer worked collaboratively and was not necessarily the originator or sole designer of every issue for which he prepared artwork.
