= Oneeka Williams =

Urologic surgeon, author

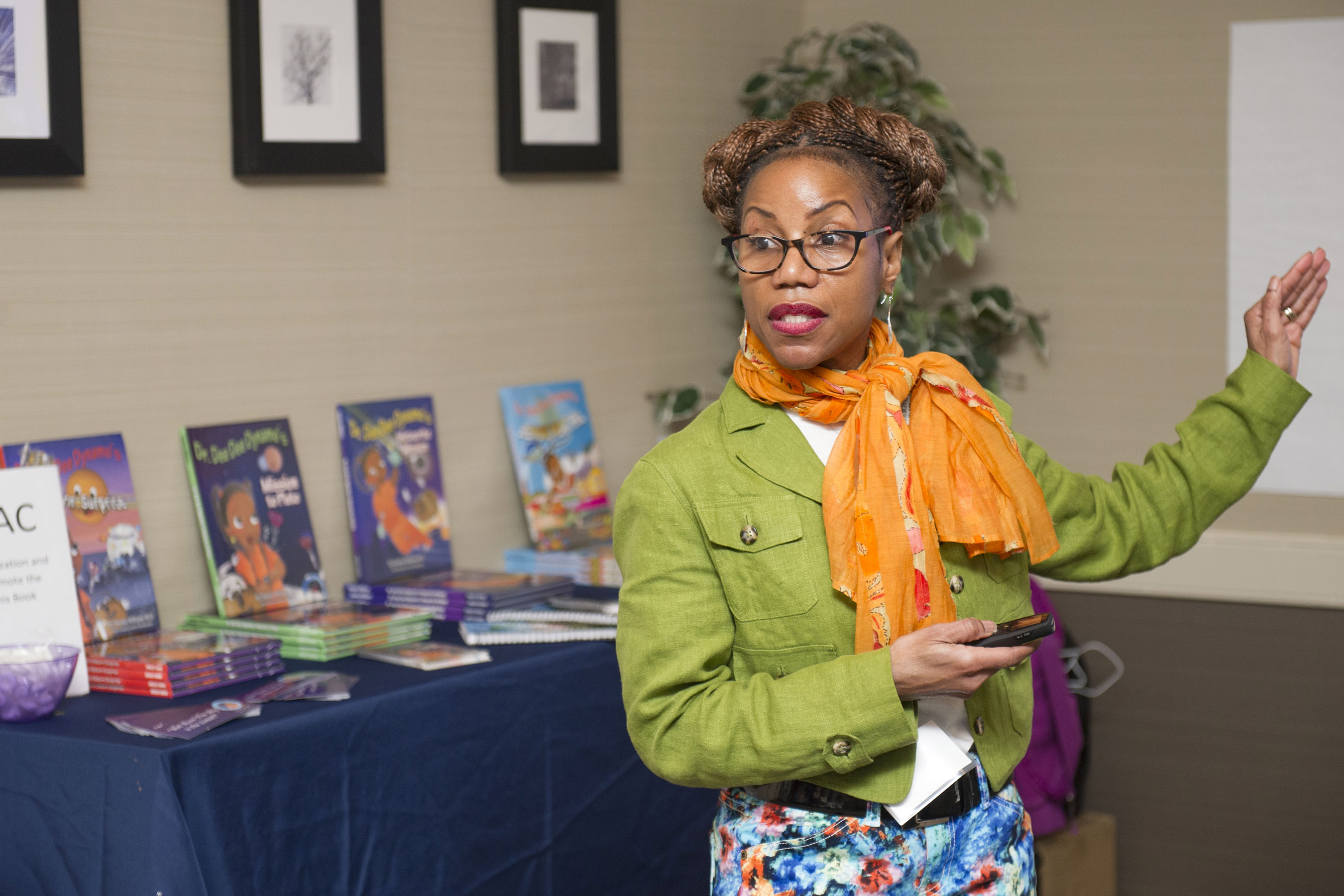
- Born: March 2, 1966 (age 60); Guyana
- Education: Johns Hopkins University, Harvard Medical School
- Website: https://www.drdeedeedynamo.com/

Oneeka Williams (born March 2, 1966) is a urologic surgeon, writer, and children's book author known for her book series Dr. Dee Dee Dynamo. She currently works at Emerson Hospital's Urology Department and is a clinical assistant professor of urology at Tufts University School of Medicine.

== Early life ==
Oneeka Williams was born in Guyana. Then, early on in life she moved to Barbados where her mother worked as a science teacher and her father worked as a journalist.

== Career ==
=== Medical career ===
She graduated from Johns Hopkins University with a BA in biophysics, Harvard Medical School with an MD, and Harvard T.H. Chan School of Public Health with a MPH. Oneeka Williams completed her surgical internship at Massachusetts General Hospital in Boston, MA, and her residency at Lahey Clinic in Burlington, MA. Oneeka Williams is currently working as a urologic surgeon in Concord, MA at Emerson Urology.

=== Writing career ===
Williams is founder and CEO of Dr. Dee Dee Dynamo, LLC located in Newtonville, Massachusetts.

Williams has published seven books. These include five books for the Dr. Dee Dee Dynamo series, an autobiography, and one book in her new series "Not Even the Sky is the Limit."

== Publications ==
=== Dr. Dee Dee Dynamo's Series ===
- Dr. Dee Dee Dynamo's Mission to Pluto (March 5, 2013)
- Dr. Dee Dee Dynamo's Saturn Surprise (February 3, 2015)
- Dr. Dee Dee Dynamo's Bee More Breakthru Coloring & Activity Book (October 4, 2016)
- Dr. Dee Dee Dynamo's Vineyard Vacation (January 1, 2018)
- Dr. Dee Dee Dynamo's Ice Worm Intervention (April 5, 2018)

=== Not Even the Sky is the Limit Series ===
- My Joy Tank (January 1, 2019)

=== Independent books ===
- Not Today, Negativity!: 5 Habits of Positivity to Cope, Hope, and Be Well in Tough Times (August 17, 2021)

== See also ==
- Urology
- Health in Guyana
