= Parliament Building, Guyana =

Seat of the National Assembly of Guyana

Parliament Building
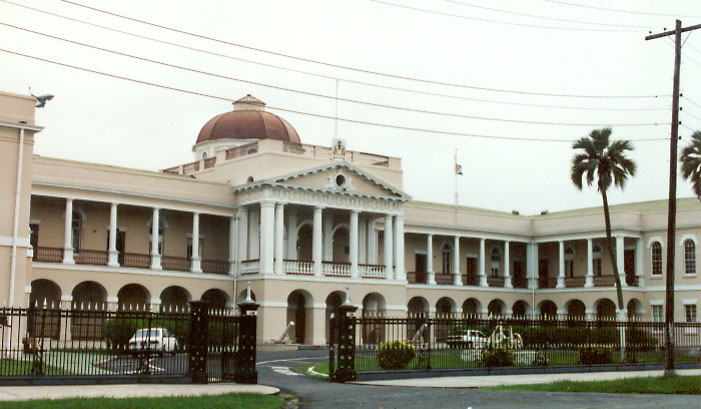

- Location within Guyana

General information
- Architectural style: Renaissance Revival
- Location: Brickdam, Georgetown, Guyana
- Coordinates: 06°48′31″N 58°10′00″W
- Construction started: 1829
- Completed: 21 February 1834
- Inaugurated: 5 August 1834; 191 years ago
- Cost: £ 50,000

Design and construction
- Architect: Joseph Hadfield

The Parliament Building houses the National Assembly of Guyana, and is located in the capital Georgetown. The building was designed by Joseph Hadfield, and is located in Brickdam where the Court of Policy used to be. The building was completed on 21 February 1834. The Parliamentary Chamber contains a decorated ceiling designed by Cesar Castellani.

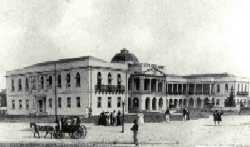
Parliament Buildings in the 19th century

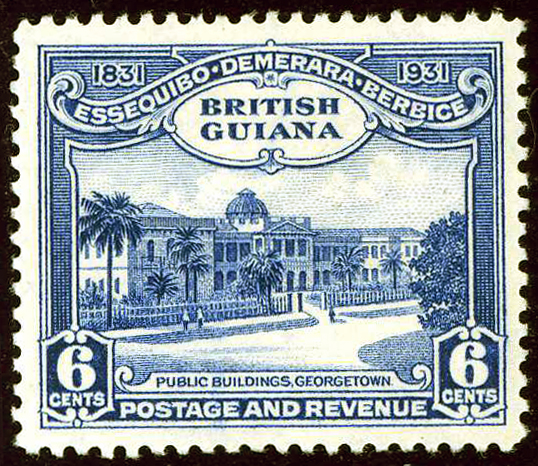
Parliament Building on a 1931 British Guiana stamp

In 1998, the Parliament Library opened in the building. The ceiling suffered from the hot and humid climate, and was reconstructed between 2000 and 2005.
