= Caribbean campaign of 1803–1810 =

Campaign of the Napoleonic Wars

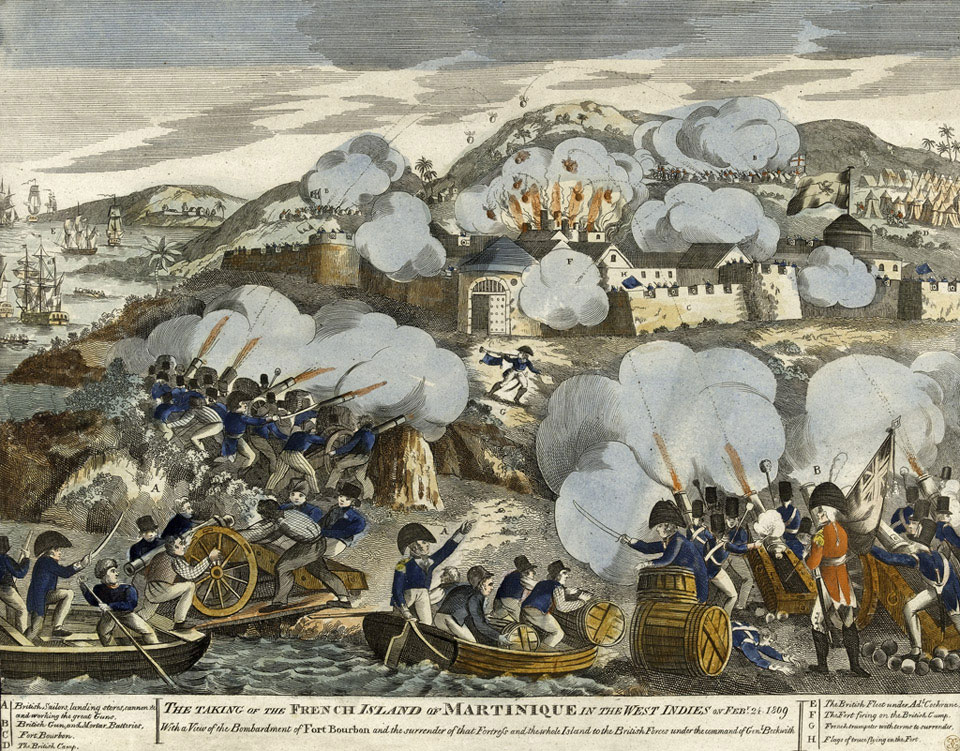
The British invasion of Martinique in 1809, a major engagement of the campaign

The Caribbean campaign of 1803–1810 was a military campaign of the Napoleonic Wars fought in the West Indies. Following the British declaration of war against France in May 1803, British forces moved to capture the Caribbean colonies of the French and their allies. Taking advantage of the Royal Navy's control of the sea, British expeditionary forces launched successive invasions of French, Dutch and Danish colonies in the region. Between June 1803 and 1804, Britain captured Saint Lucia and Tobago from France and Demerara, Essequibo, Berbice and Surinam from the Dutch. Substantial French naval contingents arrived in the West Indies in 1805, but were only able to recapture Diamond Rock from the British before returning to Europe.

Between 1806 and 1807, Britain captured the Dutch colonies of Aruba and Curaçao along with the Danish West Indies, and from 1808 to 1809 a rebellion in Santo Domingo drove out the French with British support and restored the colony to Spain. British forces followed up these victories by capturing the French colonies of Martinique in 1809 and Guadeloupe in 1810, which also led to the capitulation of the French and Dutch colonies of Saba, Sint Eustatius and Saint Martin. By the end of 1810, the entire West Indies was under the control of Britain, its ally Spain or neutral Haiti, bringing an end to the campaign.

== Background ==
By 1804, France had lost control of the colonies of Saint-Domingue and Louisiana. Haiti declared its independence as the First Empire of Haiti, while Louisiana was sold to the United States.

However, France still maintained control over the Captaincy General of Santo Domingo, which it had acquired from Spain in 1795 in the Peace of Basel, in addition to the island colonies of Martinique and Guadeloupe along with Cayenne in South America. The Batavian Republic, allied to France, also maintained control over several colonies in the West Indies and South America.

== Campaigns ==
=== Saint-Domingue ===
In 1803, British forces began working alongside the rebel Indigenous Army in Saint-Domingue, sending naval squadrons to blockade French-controlled ports and block off the reinforcements Napoleon planned to send to defeat the rebels following Britain's declaration of war on France in May 1803. The British provided extensive material aid, including arms, to the rebels, and the Royal Navy engaged in the blockade of Saint-Domingue, ending in the defeat of the French and Haitian independence on 1 January 1804. Surviving French troops who surrendered to the British were shipped off the island, desperate not to surrender to the vengeful rebels.

=== Caribbean campaign 1803 ===
The United Kingdom's campaign in the Caribbean began shortly after the breakdown of the Treaty of Amiens. Hostilities with France resumed in May 1803 but official notification did not arrive in the West Indies until mid-June, along with orders to attack France's valuable sugar islands, Martinique, St Lucia and Tobago. Martinique was rejected as too well defended but the commanders in chief, William Grinfield and Samuel Hood, thought attacks against the other two islands feasible, and the expedition set out from Barbados on 20 June with 3,149 soldiers, two ships-of-the-line, two frigates, converted to troopships, and two sloops. St Lucia was captured on 22 June 1803, after the island's main fortress, Morne Fortune had been stormed, and Tobago nine days later and, after leaving men to hold these islands, the expedition returned to Barbados.

On 10 August, Grinfield received orders to call on the surrender of the colonies of Demerara, Essequibo and Berbice. The Dutch colonies, unhappy with the rule of the Batavian Republic had applied to the British government for a peaceful take over. A large portion of Grinfield's forces had since been used up as garrisons of the newly captured French islands but by supplementing his force with Royal Marines, he was able to amass some 1,300 men. Light winds delayed their arrival off Georgetown until 18 September when a summons was immediately dispatched to the Dutch governor. A party arrived on 20 June and terms of surrender were agreed. Another deputation had to be sent to the separately governed colony of Berbice which was eventually taken, without a fight, on 27 September.

=== Caribbean campaign 1804 ===
In 1804, the British captured Surinam. The invasion force comprised Commodore Samuel Hood's flagship HMS Centaur, Emerald, the 44-gun heavy frigates Pandour and Serapis, the 28-gun sixth-rate Alligator, the 12-gun schooner Unique, the 12-gun corvette Hippomenes, and the 8-gun Drake, together with 2,000 troops under Brigadier-General Sir Charles Green.

=== Reconquista (Santo Domingo) ===
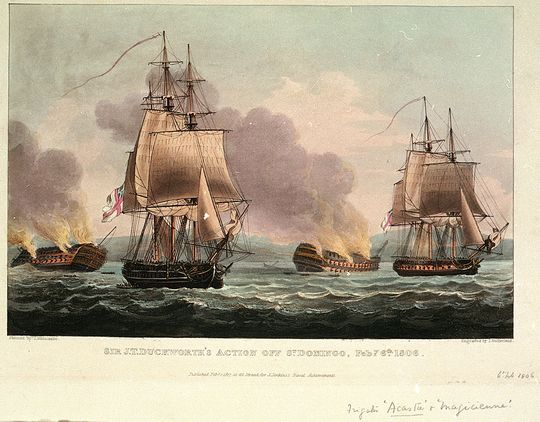
Sir J.T. Duckworth's Action off San Domingo, Feb. 7 8th 1806, Thomas Whitcombe

By this time Spain a former enemy of the British and ally of the French was now invaded by French forces which led to the Peninsula war. Once the news of the invasion had reached the island, the criollos of Santo Domingo revolted against French rule and were later assisted by the Royal Navy of the United Kingdom who were now Spain's new ally.

=== Invasion of Cayenne 1809 ===
By 1808 French colonial territories in the Caribbean were a drain on both the French and British navies. The fortified harbours on the islands and coastal towns provided shelter for French warships and privateers that could strike against British trade routes at will, forcing the Royal Navy to divert extensive resources to protect their convoys. However, the maintenance and support of these bases was a significant task for the French Navy. It had suffered a series of defeats during the war that left it blockaded in its own harbours and unable to put to sea without attack from British squadrons waiting off the coast. Cut off from French trade and supplies, the Caribbean colonies began to suffer from food shortages and collapsing economies, and messages were sent to France in the summer of 1808 requesting urgent help.

Some of these messages were intercepted by the patrolling Royal Navy. Based on the description in those messages of the low morale and weak defences of the Caribbean territories, the decision was taken to eliminate the threat from the French colonies for the remainder of the war by seizing and occupying them in a series of amphibious operations. Command of this campaign was given to Rear-Admiral Sir Alexander Cochrane, who focused his initial efforts on Martinique, gathering a substantial force of ships and men at Barbados in preparation for the planned invasion. While the main British forces concentrated in the Leeward Islands, smaller expeditionary forces were sent to watch other French colonies.

== Aftermath ==
The fall of Guadeloupe marked the end of the final French territory in the Caribbean; the entire region was now in the hands of either the British or the Spanish, except the independent state of Haiti. The lack of French privateers and warships sparked a boom in trade operations, and the economies of the Caribbean islands experienced a resurgence. It also made a significant reduction in French international trade and had a corresponding effect on the French economy.

Finally, the capture of the last French colony struck a decisive blow to the Atlantic slave trade. It had been made illegal by the British government in 1807 and was actively persecuted by the Royal Navy. Without French colonies in the Caribbean, there was no ready market for slaves in the region and the slave trade consequently dried up.

== See also ==
- Era de Francia
