= HMS Guachapin =

Brig of the Royal Navy

History

Spain
- Name: Guachapin
- Launched: 1800, Bayonne
- Captured: 9 April 1800

Great Britain
- Name: HMS Guachapin
- Acquired: 1800 (by capture)
- Commissioned: February 1801
- Fate: Wrecked 29 July 1811; salvaged and sold

General characteristics
- Type: Spanish merchant brig
- Tons burthen: 176 tons (bm)
- Length: 80 ft 5 in (24.51 m) (overall); c. 63 ft 4 in (19.30 m) (keel)
- Beam: 23 ft 1 in (7.04 m)
- Depth of hold: 11 ft 0 in (3.35 m)
- Propulsion: Sails
- Sail plan: Brig
- Armament: Spanish service:10 guns; British service: 12 × 12-pounder carronades + 2 × 6-pounder guns

HMS Guachapin was a brig, the former Spanish letter of marque Guachapin, launched at Bayonne in 1800, which the British captured early in 1800 and took into service with the Royal Navy. Under the British flag she captured a Spanish privateer larger and better-armed than herself. She also served at the captures of the islands of St. Bartholomew, St. Martin, St. Thomas, St. Croix, Tobago, and St. Lucia, and of Surinam. She served at Antigua as a guard ship but was wrecked in 1811. She was then salvaged and sold.

== Privateer ==
Captain Charles Penrose of the third rate Sans Pareil captured Guachapin in the Leeward Islands. The London Gazette reports that on 9 April 1800, Sans Pareil captured the Spanish letter of marque trader Guakerpin, of 165 tons burthen (bm), ten guns and 38 men. She belonged to Saint Andero, and was sailing from there to Vera Cruz with a cargo of iron, porter, and linens. (Note: The term "Guachapin", "Guachupin", or "Gachupin" is a Mexican term for a person of Spanish birth. During the colonial period the term was used to refer to royal officials and to immigrants. The term is still used today and often has a derogatory connotation. Marshall described Guachupin's figurehead as being one of well-dressed young man, holding a letter in one hand and an empty purse in the other. Her captain stated that this represented a needy Spaniard petitioning the Viceroy for money.)

== British warship ==
The British took Guachupin into service. On 16 December 1800, Guachupin captured a French schooner off Guadaloupe. Her crew had abandoned the schooner, which had a cargo of flour and lumber. On 26 December Guachupin captured the French schooner Hebe 12 leagues (58 km) west of Guadeloupe. She was carrying flour and gin.

Guachupin was commissioned in February 1801 under Commander Samuel Butcher. Between 15 March and 7 April, an expedition under Lieutenant-General Thomas Trigge and Admiral Duckworth captured the islands of St. Bartholomew, St. Martin, St. Thomas, and St. Croix. Guachupin [sic] was listed among the vessels participating in the expedition and entitled to a share in the "proceeds of sundry articles of provisions, merchandise, stores, and property afloat" that had been captured.

Guachapin's greatest moment of glory came later that year on 18 August 1801. On that day Heureux was between Martinique and St Lucia when she saw the Guachapin in an unequal fight against a Spanish letter of marque armed with 18 brass guns – 32 and 12-pounders. Heureux sailed up as fast as she could but even before she arrived the Spaniard had struck to Guachapin. The two-hour engagement had cost Guachapin three men killed and three wounded, and the Spaniard nearly the same. The Spaniard was the Theresa, under the command of an officer of the Spanish Navy and had a crew of 120 men. On 3 December, a Spanish privateer captured William, Ramsey, master, as William was on her way from Trinidad to the Clyde. Guachapin recaptured William that same day.

In April 1802 Commander Kenneth Mackenzie (or M'Kenzie) took command.

In 1803, after the recommencement of hostilities with France, Guachapin participated in the captures of Tobago and St. Lucia. In September 1803, Guachupin [sic] captured three prizes. On 2 September she was in company with Saint Lucia when they captured two vessels whose names they did not record:

- A sloop carrying a cargo of coffee, sugar, and the like
- A schooner in ballast. Then on 24 September Guachapin captured the Spanish ship Industria, which was carrying 220 slaves (French property). On 25 January 1804, Saint Lucia captured the French privateers Furet and Bijou. Bijou, had captured two prizes, one of which was the brig Good Intent, which had been sailing from Barbados to Demarara, and which Guachapin had already retaken.

A few months later, Guachapin assisted Commodore Sir Samuel Hood's squadron at the capture of Surinam River in 1804. The squadron consisted of Hood's flagship, the 74-gun third rate Centaur, Pandour, Serapis, Alligator, Hippomenes, Drake, the 10-gun schooner Unique, and transports carrying 2,000 troops under Brigadier-General Sir Charles Green. On 24 April, Hippomenes, under Commander Conway Shipley, escorted a convoy carrying a division of the army under Brigadier-General Frederick Maitland to land at Warappa creek to collect enough boats from the plantations to transport troops to the rear of Fort New Amsterdam. On 30 April, Mackenzie, unable to sail closer, left Guachapin 50 leagues (240 km) to leeward and brought up all her boats, together with 50 crewmen. He then assisted Shipley in superintending the landing of Maitland's troops at Warappa. The Dutch governor initially rejected the surrender terms but surrendered on 5 May after the British captured the battery of Friderici. The officers and men from Guachapin who had served ashore during the capture of Suriname were among those that shared in the prize money from the campaign. In June 1804 Commander Robert Henderson replaced Mackenzie, who had transferred to take command of the newly-captured Surinam in May, and then Hippomenes in June. On 13 September 1806, Guachapin became a guardship at St. Johns, Antigua. In 1807 she was under Acting Lieutenant Uriah Goodwin. In 1810, William Fletcher was promoted to lieutenant to command her.

== Fate ==
At some point Lieutenant Michael Jenkins took command. On 29 July 1811, a hurricane drove Guachapin on shore at Rat Island, Antigua, where she was bilged. Jenkins and his crew were all saved, as were most of the stores. Later the British recovered the brig. Rather than recommission her they sold her in Jamaica.
