= Charles Richardson (Royal Navy officer) =

Royal Navy officer (1769–1850)

Vice-Admiral Sir Charles Richardson KCB
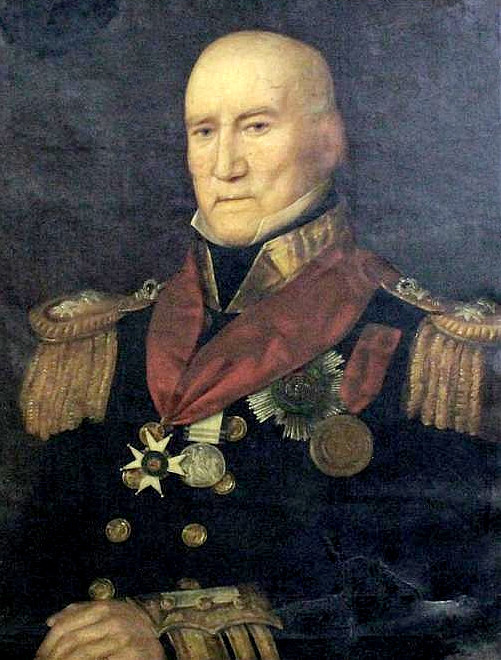
- Portrait of Richardson
- Born: Baptized 10 March 1769; Shap, Westmorland
- Died: 10 November 1850 (aged 83); Painsthorpe Hall, Yorkshire
- Military career
- Allegiance: Great Britain; United Kingdom
- Branch: Royal Navy
- Service years: 1787–1850
- Rank: Vice-Admiral of the White
- Commands: HMS Alligator; HMS Centaur; HMS Caesar; HMS Semiramis; HMS Leander; HMS Topaze
- Conflicts: Third Anglo-Mysore War; Battle of Tellicherry; French Revolutionary Wars; Action of 29 May 1794; Glorious First of June; Battle of Camperdown; Battle of Callantsoog; Vlieter Incident; Battle of Abukir; Battle of Mandora; Battle of Alexandria; Napoleonic Wars; Caribbean campaign; Battle of Suriname; Battle of Les Sables-d'Olonne; Battle of the Basque Roads; Walcheren Campaign
- Awards: Order of the Crescent; Naval General Service Medal with four clasps

Vice-Admiral Sir Charles Richardson KCB (c. 10 March 1769 – 10 November 1850) was a Royal Navy officer of the 18th and 19th centuries. His naval career began when he joined HMS Vestal as a captain's servant in 1787. In Vestal he made an aborted journey to China before serving on the East Indies Station where he transferred to HMS Phoenix and fought in the Battle of Tellicherry and the Third Anglo-Mysore War in 1791 and 1792. Having returned to England as a master's mate, Richardson fought at the Glorious First of June on HMS Royal George in 1794 before being promoted to lieutenant in HMS Circe. In 1797, he successfully combated the Nore mutiny in Circe before fighting in the Battle of Camperdown where he personally captured the Dutch admiral Jan Willem de Winter. Afterwards he became flag lieutenant to Admiral Adam Duncan and fought at the Battle of Callantsoog and the Vlieter Incident in the Anglo-Russian invasion of Holland of 1799. He then sailed to Egypt in HMS Kent where he again went onshore, fighting in the battles of Abukir, Mandora, and Alexandria in 1801.

Promoted to commander in July 1801, Richardson was given command of the en flute HMS Alligator. After the Napoleonic Wars began in 1803 he was sent to the Leeward Islands Station, where he captured three Dutch settlements in September. Richardson made a valuable contribution in the Battle of Suriname in the following year for which he was given command of HMS Centaur and promoted to post-captain. Leaving Centaur in 1805, at the start of the next year he received command of HMS Caesar. In Caesar Richardson fought at the battles of Les Sables-d'Olonne and the Basque Roads in 1809. He joined the Walcheren Campaign later in the year, where he took command of a naval brigade operating ashore. In 1810 he was given command of HMS Semiramis in the English Channel; cooperating with HMS Diana he fought an action against two French warships and a small convoy off the Gironde that was complimented by Spencer Perceval, the prime minister.

Leaving Semiramis in 1815, Richardson's next command came in 1819 as captain of HMS Leander on the East Indies Station. He transferred to HMS Topaze in 1821 and sailed to China, where his crew killed two Chinese locals in what they claimed was self-defence. The resulting diplomatic incident was settled at the start of the following year but caused such a strain on Richardson's health that he was invalided home in October 1822. This was his last service in the Royal Navy, but he continued to be rewarded, being nominated a Knight Commander of the Order of the Bath in 1841 and promoted to vice-admiral in 1847. He died of influenza at his home at Painsthorpe in 1850.

== Early life ==
Charles Richardson was probably born at Barker Hill in the parish of Shap, in Westmorland, England. He was baptized on 10 March 1769. Until the age of fifteen, Richardson was educated at the village of Bampton. While little is recorded of Richardson's family, he was related to Sir Francis Wood of Yorkshire. Richardson's father, whose name is not recorded, was an officer in the Royal Navy. He was killed at the Battle of Trincomalee in 1782 and buried at Fort St. George, an area in which his son would serve in later years.

== Naval career ==
=== Early career ===
==== East Indies ====
Richardson joined the Royal Navy as a captain's servant (the rating given to boys awaiting an opportunity to become a midshipman) on board the 28-gun (Note: This number indicates the established amount of cannon carried on the deck(s) of a warship. This relates to the main armament only, usually made up of long guns.) frigate HMS Vestal, commanded by Captain Sir Richard Strachan, a contemporary of his father, on 23 November 1787. (Note: Also recorded as joining as a midshipman.) Soon after this Vestal was sent to China to convey the politician Charles Allan Cathcart so that he could open diplomatic channels with the Chinese. Cathcart was already ill when he began the mission and his health declined further while on board Vestal; Richardson was charged with reading to him and keeping him company, and Cathcart agreed that on arrival in China Richardson would become his aide de camp. This did not happen because Cathcart died in the Bangka Strait en route in 1788. Vestal then returned to England and underwent a refit in May 1789. On 29 August she was again sent far abroad, this time to India conveying Major-General William Medows to his new post as governor of Bombay. Richardson remained on the East Indies Station after this and in April 1791 Strachan transferred to the command of the 36-gun frigate HMS Phoenix, taking Richardson with him.

On 19 November Phoenix was sailing with the 36-gun frigate HMS Perseverance off the Malabar Coast when they stopped two French merchant vessels to search them. The merchants were being protected by the French 42-gun frigate Résolue, and this ship opened fire on the British vessels during their attempts to search the ships. (Note: While both British frigates attacked Résolue, she only fired at Phoenix.) The British ships attacked the frigate and forced her to surrender after killing twenty-five of her crew in an engagement in which Phoenix herself had only six men killed. In the same year the Third Anglo-Mysore War began in India, and Richardson was subsequently given command of Phoenix's boats for service in the war. They served in a number of rivers in cooperation with Major-General Sir Robert Abercromby's army combating Tipu Sultan. Richardson was employed in this role for several months before he rejoined Phoenix.

==== English Channel and the North Sea ====
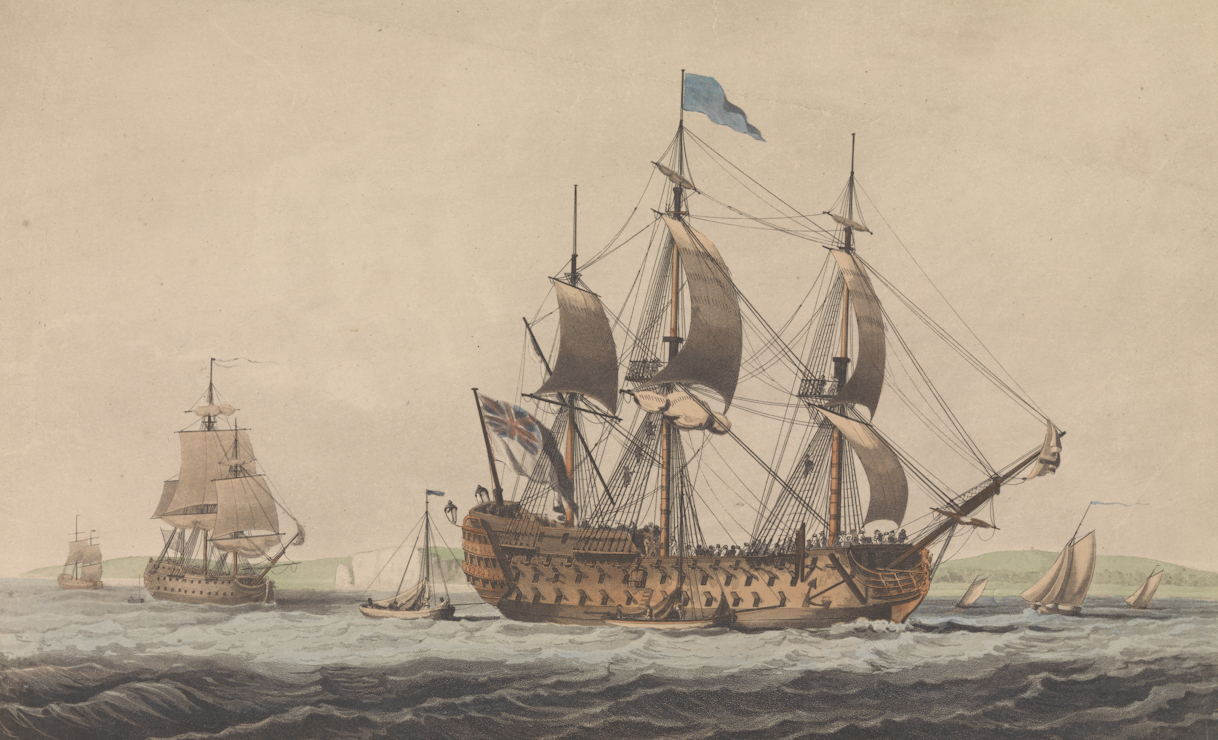
HMS Royal George, in which Richardson fought his first fleet action

Phoenix returned to England in August 1793, Richardson having been promoted to midshipman and then master's mate by this time. Here he left the frigate, and joined instead the 74-gun ship of the line HMS Alexander on 28 December, serving in Admiral Lord Howe's Channel Fleet. The captain of Alexander, Captain Thomas West, wanted to replace Richardson with his own nephew, and made it known to the other officers that this was his goal. Despite this Richardson continued onboard, and while serving on Alexander he passed his examination for promotion to lieutenant. Towards the beginning of 1794 Richardson heard of the plan to remove him, and in response to it he successfully demanded of West his discharge from the ship. He took a boat to another ship of the line in the fleet, the 100-gun HMS Royal George. Royal George was the flagship of Vice-Admiral Sir Alexander Hood, and Hood took Richardson on as a master's mate in that vessel after Strachan provided a good report on him to the admiral. Richardson fought in Royal George at the action of 29 May 1794 and then at the subsequent Glorious First of June in both of which the ship was heavily engaged, having 92 casualties from a crew of 866. On 4 August of the same year, he was promoted to lieutenant and sent to join the 28-gun frigate HMS Circe in Admiral Adam Duncan's North Sea Fleet.

In May 1797, Richardson, now the first lieutenant of Circe, and his ship were caught in the Nore mutiny. The majority of the crew looked to take over the ship, and they were barricaded below decks by Circe's marines while a small portion were allowed to continue sailing the ship. Richardson and his captain, Peter Halkett, sat back-to-back on the quarterdeck armed with pistols and carbines and succeeded in keeping control of Circe, for which they were thanked by the Admiralty. Until the mutiny was quashed Circe was one of only three vessels still serving in the North Sea Fleet, making signals to each other to pretend that they had more ships than they did.

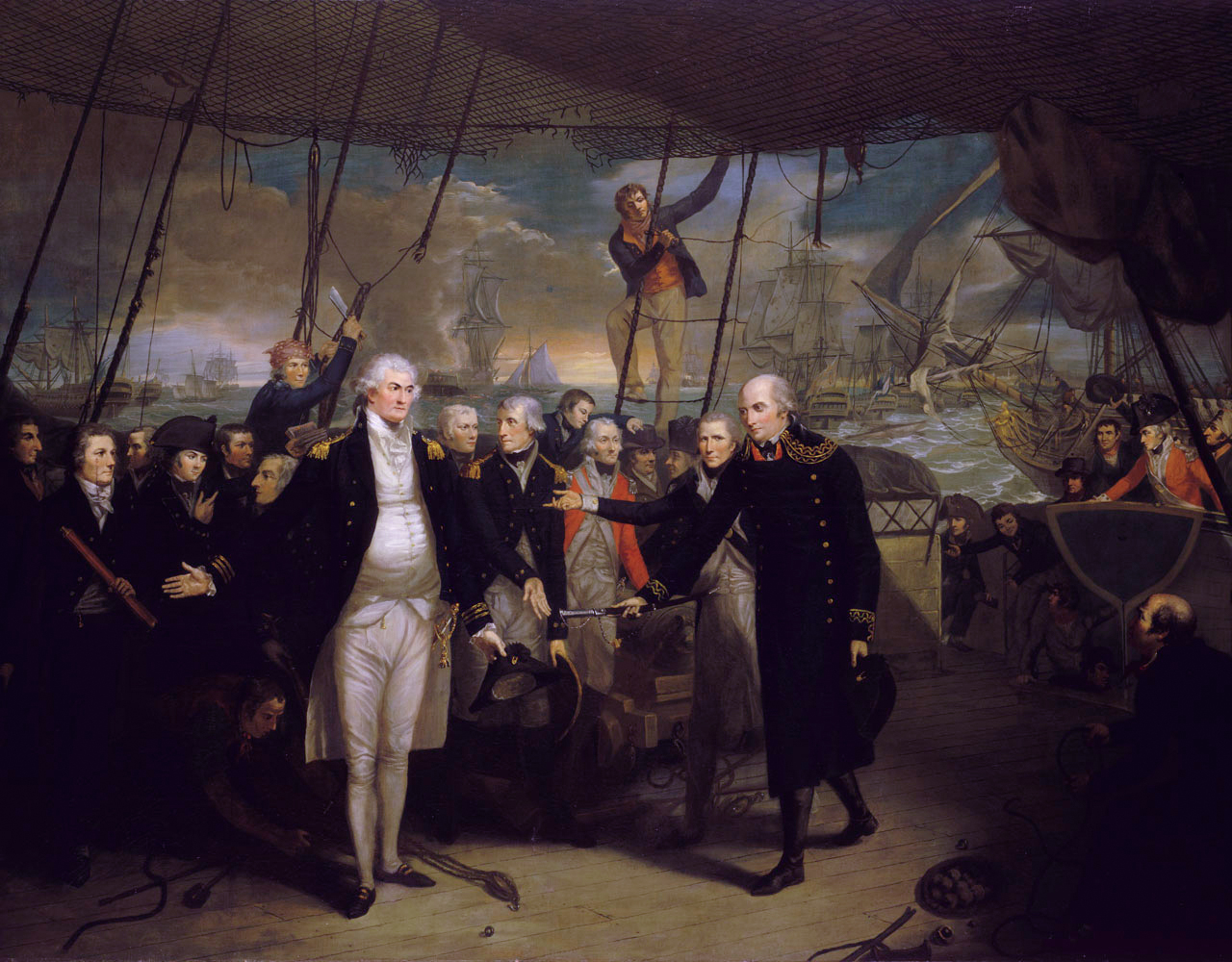
De Winter surrenders to Duncan, an event brought about by Richardson

Circe was subsequently employed in the squadron of Captain Henry Trollope to patrol off the Texel, and was then present at Duncan's Battle of Camperdown on 11 October, where she served as a repeating frigate. (Note: Repeating frigates stationed out of the line of battle mirrored the flag signals sent out by their admirals so that messages could be more easily spread throughout the fleet.) As the battle came to a close the Dutch admiral Jan Willem de Winter's flagship Vrijheid had been dismasted and was lying silent. Richardson saw this and volunteered to go over to the Dutch vessel in one of Circe's boats to ensure that de Winter did not use the lack of attention being given his damaged ship to escape to another vessel. Successfully capturing the admiral, Richardson took him to Duncan.

Richardson's action impressed Duncan, who in January 1798 took him to serve on his flagship, the 74-gun ship of the line HMS Venerable. Richardson then transferred with Duncan to the 74-gun ship of the line HMS Kent on 6 March, becoming his flag lieutenant there. In 1799 Kent was sent to support the Anglo-Russian invasion of Holland and Richardson was sent ashore with a contingent of seamen, with which he controlled a gun battery attached to the army of Lieutenant-General Sir Ralph Abercromby. He fought with his men at the landings of the army and the Battle of Callantsoog on 27 August. The Dutch admiral Samuel Story surrendered his fleet in the Vlieter Incident on 30 August, in which Richardson saw some action. He was given command of a captured Dutch 68-gun ship of the line, and sailed her to England, afterwards rejoining Kent.

==== Egypt ====
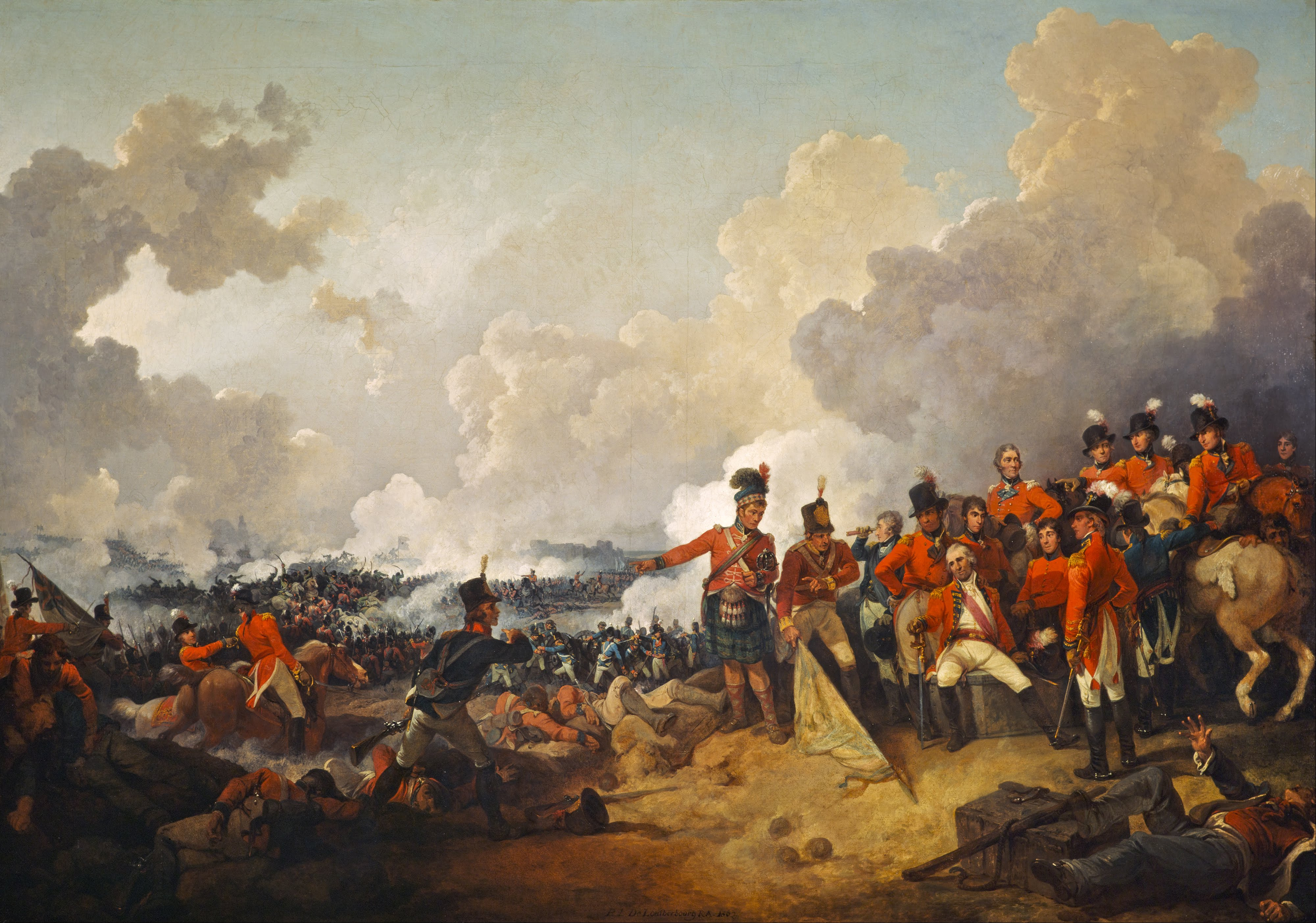
The Battle of Alexandria, at which Richardson served as aide de camp to Abercromby

In June 1800 Kent sailed to serve in the Mediterranean Sea, with it expected that she would assist in an operation to reinforce Cádiz with Vice-Admiral Lord Keith's portion of the Mediterranean Fleet. They arrived on 4 October but the endeavour was abandoned on 7 October because disease was rife in the port and poor weather hampered attempts to land the fleet's forces. Having afterwards been sent to Gibraltar, Kent went to support Abercromby again, this time in going to Egypt to begin the British response to the French campaign in Egypt and Syria, in December. Richardson was by this point first lieutenant of Kent, and he was given responsibility for landing some of Abercromby's army when they arrived, which took place at the Battle of Abukir on 8 March 1801. Richardson served as second in command to Captain Sir Sidney Smith in the naval brigade landed to assist the army, and he then fought at the Battle of Mandora on 13 March, where the brigade had eighty-five men incapacitated.

After Richardson came to the attention of Abercromby in both Holland and now Egypt, the general appointed him as one of his aides de camp. As such Richardson was present at the Battle of Alexandria on 21 March, where he served as a messenger as well as fighting with the naval contingent present. Abercromby was victorious, but died of wounds received at Alexandria seven days later. The day after the battle Richardson was transferred to the 36-gun frigate HMS Penelope, as her first lieutenant. The frigate returned home to England and then took Captain Sir Alexander Ball to Malta in June. On 12 July, Richardson was given the acting rank of commander and command of the en flute (meaning that her main armament had been removed) 28-gun frigate HMS Alligator. For his services in Egypt Richardson was awarded the gold medal second class of the Order of the Crescent by the Ottoman Empire.

=== Commander ===
Richardson's rank as a commander was made permanent on 9 October 1802 and he continued in command of Alligator, serving during the Peace of Amiens in the Firth of Forth. In April 1803 he was sent to serve on the Leeward Islands Station, at the start of the Napoleonic Wars. Richardson was then given control over the direction of a flotilla that peacefully captured the Dutch settlements of Demerara, Essequibo, and Berbice in September. On 27 September, he shared in the capture of the Dutch 18-gun corvette Hippomenes. He subsequently fought at the Battle of Suriname on 5 May 1804, where the Dutch colony of Surinam was captured. Alligator assisted at first by bringing the 64th Regiment of Foot ashore; Richardson then went ashore himself and attacked two Dutch forts with a mixed force of sailors and soldiers. Capturing them, he used their guns to fire down upon New Amsterdam. For his efforts in this endeavour he was highly praised in the dispatches sent home after the battle. Richardson was rewarded by the commander-in-chief in the Leeward Islands, Commodore Sir Samuel Hood, with the acting command of his flagship, the 74-gun ship of the line HMS Centaur, on 6 July. His promotion to post-captain in consequence of this was confirmed on 27 September of the same year.

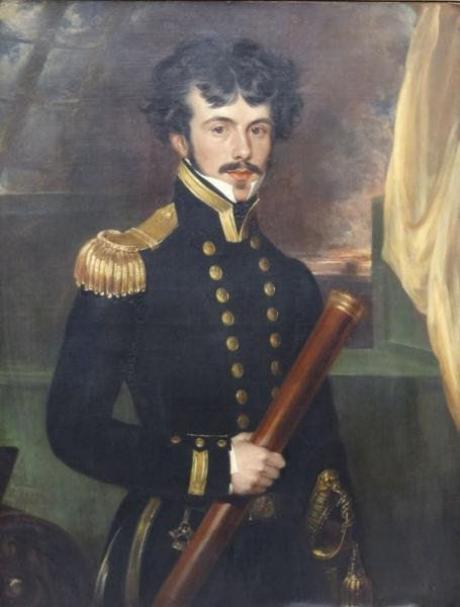
Richardson soon after being promoted to post-captain

=== Post-captain ===
==== Strachan's squadron ====
Richardson returned to England with Hood in March 1805 and soon after left the ship, going on leave to Westmorland where he purchased a small cottage and thirty-six acres (fifteen hectares) of land and visited his relative, Sir Francis. He was not unemployed for long and was given command of the 80-gun ship of the line HMS Caesar on 11 January 1806. (Note: Also recorded as 2 January.) Caesar was the flagship of the now-Rear-Admiral Strachan, and Richardson was his flag captain. Strachan's squadron was tasked with hunting a French squadron under Admiral Jean-Baptiste Philibert Willaumez that had escaped from Brest. They chased Willaumez to Brazil and the Leeward Islands but failed to catch him, and Richardson subsequently served in Caesar in the blockading force off Rochefort. In February 1808, Strachan's squadron was sent to chase a different French force, this time of Rear-Admiral Zacharie Allemand, in the Mediterranean Sea. Again they were unable to engage their opponents, Allemand safely entering Toulon on 6 February.

==== Walcheren Campaign ====
Caesar then became the flagship of Rear-Admiral Robert Stopford. Under him Richardson fought at the Battle of Les Sables-d'Olonne on 23 February 1809, where three French frigates were forced against the coast by the squadron and destroyed. Then on 11 April the squadron participated in the Battle of the Basque Roads, where fireships assisted in destroying four French ships of the line that had been part of the same fleet as the frigates at Les Sables-d'Olonne. Caesar was little engaged at the Basque Roads because of her large draught. By July, Strachan had returned to the squadron and again took Caesar as his flagship. Richardson thus sailed with the Walcheren Expedition to the Netherlands in the same month. He went ashore on 30 July in command of a brigade of eighty seamen, and a day later the gun boats of Strachan's squadron attacked the Dutch town of Camvere. When the ships were forced to halt their bombardment because of a change in the wind towards the end of the day, Richardson set up a battery of incendiary rockets on top of a dyke and opened fire on the defensive positions around the town. That night Camvere offered to surrender and Richardson went with the army's Lieutenant-General Alexander Fraser to negotiate terms. In his report on the action, Strachan gave the credit for the fall of the town to Richardson and his rocket initiative, the new weapon having scared the garrison into capitulation.

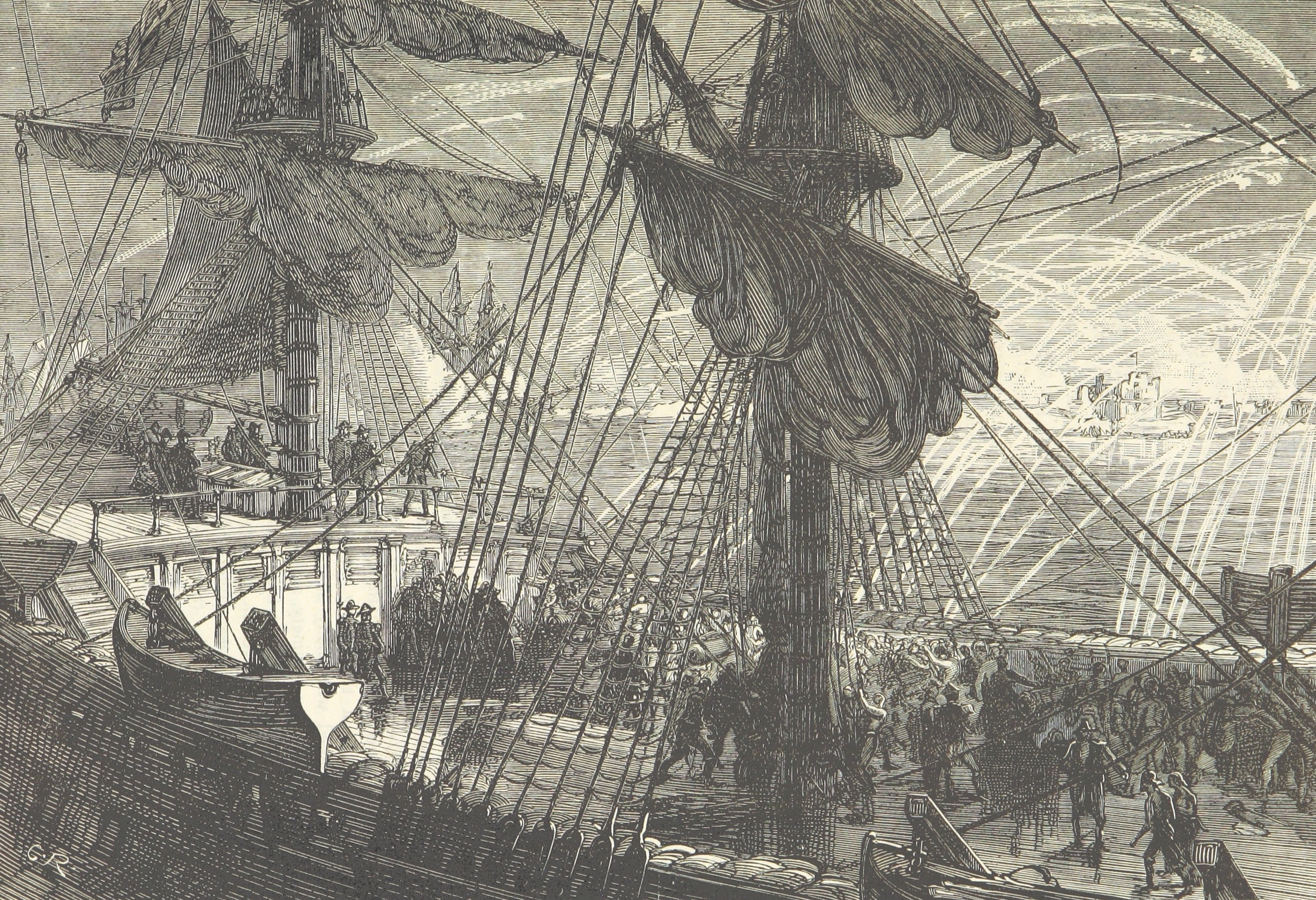
The bombardment of Flushing during the Walcheren Campaign

The 519 Dutch soldiers from Camvere were taken as prisoners of war in the morning of 1 August, and the British force then moved on to attack the nearby fortification of Fort Rammekens, which controlled the waters of the West Scheldt. Richardson and his men were employed in the bombardment of that place until it surrendered on 3 August. On 12 August the expedition attacked Flushing, the only Dutch strongpoint remaining on Walcheren, and Richardson had his men man a battery of six 24-pounder cannon. (Note: This battery was known in the action as B Battery.) In the early morning of 14 August Richardson finished mounting the guns of his battery, 600 yards from the town, and in two hours destroyed all the Dutch cannon facing him. Flushing surrendered later in the day after a continued bombardment. (Note: Captain Charles Pasley, a Royal Engineer present at Walcheren, criticised the reports sent home by Richardson; Pasley argued that Richardson had overemphasised his role and that apart from with his own battery he was uninvolved in the siege works around Flushing.) His services during the expedition as a whole were highly appreciated by the army, and he received the thanks of the overall commander, Lieutenant-General Lord Chatham; the commander of the attack on Flushing, Lieutenant-General Sir Eyre Coote; and the commander of the Royal Artillery present, Major-General John Mcleod.

==== Frigate command ====
On 21 April 1810 he transferred to the command of the 36-gun frigate HMS Semiramis in which he initially served in the English Channel and on the Lisbon Station. On 24 August of the same year, Richardson was in company with the 38-gun frigate HMS Diana off the Gironde when they encountered two French warships. These ships were anchored close to the coast and were protecting a small convoy of four merchant ships. During the night the two British frigates sent their small boats into the river, where they successfully captured the convoy. In the morning Semiramis and Diana sailed towards the two French warships that remained outside the river, flying French colours to disguise themselves. This allowed Diana to get close enough to one of the French warships, the 14-gun gun brig Teazer (the ex-HMS Teazer), to board and capture her. This raised the alarm to the shore batteries and the other vessel, the 16-gun brig Pluvier. Richardson then attacked her as she attempted to make sail to defend herself, and through excellent seamanship he managed to force Pluvier aground at Royan. Despite the French warship lying under the guns of a friendly battery, he then succeeded in burning the vessel where it lay with his newly returned small boats. The captain of Diana, William Ferris, congratulated Richardson on the action. Both officers were in turn congratulated by the Prime Minister, Spencer Perceval, for the "peculiar neatness with which they...conducted the business".

After this Richardson continued in a successful run of prizetaking in Semiramis; at the beginning of 1812 he was sent to serve on the Irish Station, where he captured the French 14-gun privateer Grand Jean Bart on 29 February. Richardson sailed in Semiramis to the Cape of Good Hope Station on 28 October. He left Semiramis on 29 August 1814 when she was paid off at Portsmouth. Richardson was rewarded for his services on 4 July 1815 with his appointment as a Companion of the Order of the Bath; the Napoleonic Wars ended on 20 November. He received his next command, the 60-gun frigate HMS Leander, on 29 July 1819.

=== Post-war service and retirement ===
Leander was the flagship of Rear-Admiral Sir Henry Blackwood, who had been Richardson's captain in Penelope and had now been given command of the East Indies Station. Richardson served in Leander on the station and while there on 29 July 1821 he left Leander to command the 44-gun frigate HMS Topaze, whose captain had died on station. In Topaze he sailed from Pulo Penang to China to serve as a buffer between Chinese authorities and British merchants. Upon arriving at Canton his crew created a severe diplomatic incident after firing on a group attacking Topaze's watering party on Lintin Island and killing two locals. The Chinese authorities reacted by demanding Richardson give up one his crew to be executed, and upon Richardson refusing this demand they suspended all trade between the two nations at Canton and removed all British merchants and East India Company ships. As tensions rose soon after, a Chinese war junk made an aborted attempt to attack Topaze, and Richardson in response closed with Canton and anchored in the river, threatening Chinese trade. A Chinese mandarin was sent on board Topaze by his government soon afterwards, and through discussion with Richardson the situation was successfully resolved and tensions eased on 20 February 1822. (Note: Despite this, the Chinese continued to demand that a culprit be given up to them for the next seven years.) Richardson sailed from China at the end of the month and rejoined Leander as her captain on 23 May. Because of the events at Canton Richardson's mental state had severely deteriorated. On 14 October, with his health described as being in a "very dangerous state" by biographer John Marshall, he was invalided home via the Cape of Good Hope, also suffering from a severe fever.

This was Richardson's last active service in the Royal Navy, but he continued to be rewarded and promoted in retirement, becoming a rear-admiral on 10 January 1837, a Knight Commander of the Order of the Bath on 29 June 1841, and a vice-admiral on 17 December 1847. (Note: Full dates of promotion: rear-admiral of the blue 10 January 1837, rear-admiral of the white 23 November 1841, rear-admiral of the red 9 November 1846, vice-admiral of the blue 17 December 1847, vice-admiral of the white 9 October 1849.) In the same year he received the Naval General Service Medal with clasps for the Glorious First of June, Camperdown, Egypt, and the Basque Roads. Richardson had a house built for himself in around 1815, Painsthorpe House in Yorkshire, living there in later life. He died at Painsthorpe on 10 November 1850, aged eighty-three, from a severe bout of influenza, at the rank of vice-admiral of the white. (Note: Sources disagree on Richardson's age, with Urban stating it as eighty-three but Armstrong saying eighty-one.)
