= British campaign in the Caribbean (1803) =

Theatre of the Napoleonic Wars

- Part of the Caribbean campaign of 1803–1810
Date	20 June – 25 September 1803
Location	Caribbean
Result	British victory

Belligerents
(United Kingdom of Great Britain and Ireland) United Kingdom	(French First Republic) France; Batavian Republic

Commanders and leaders
(United Kingdom of Great Britain and Ireland) William Grinfield; Samuel Hood	(French First Republic) Antoine Noguès (French First Republic) César Berthier (Batavian Republic) Antony Meertens

Units involved
Expeditionary force	Colonial garrisons

Strength
3,149; 14 ships	800 (France); 1,500 (Batavia)

Casualties and losses
20 killed 118 wounded 8 missing 700 dead from disease	800 captured 1,500 joined British service 1 ship captured

The British campaign in the Caribbean took place during the first year of the Napoleonic Wars and began shortly after the breakdown of the Treaty of Amiens. Hostilities with France resumed in May 1803 but official notification did not arrive in the West Indies until mid-June, along with British orders to attack France's valuable sugar islands. The expedition, under commanders in chief William Grinfield and Samuel Hood, set out from Barbados on 20 June with 3,149 soldiers, two ships-of-the-line, two frigates, converted to troopships, and two sloops. St Lucia was captured on 22 June 1803, after the island's main fortress, Morne Fortunee had been stormed, and Tobago nine days later. After leaving men to hold these islands, the expedition returned to Barbados.

On 10 August, Grinfield received orders to call on the surrender of the colonies of Demerara, Essequibo and Berbice. The Dutch colonies, unhappy with the rule of the Batavian Republic had applied to the British government for a peaceful take over. A large portion of Grinfield's forces had since been used up as garrisons of the newly captured French islands but by supplementing his force with Royal Marines, he was able to amass some 1,300 men. Light winds delayed their arrival off Georgetown until 18 September when a summons was immediately dispatched to the Dutch governor. A party arrived on 20 June and terms of surrender were agreed. Another deputation had to be sent to the separately governed colony of Berbice which was eventually taken, without a fight, on 27 September.

== Background ==
The revenue from sugar was immensely important to the economies of both Britain and France. Almost half of France's foreign trade was generated in the West Indies, and a quarter of her merchant tonnage and a third of all her seaman relied on it. These issues were slightly less significant for Britain, whose dominions there employed an eighth of her merchant tonnage and generated 20% of her trade. Nevertheless, for either country, the loss of their islands would have created a serious financial problem.

Additionally, control of the Atlantic and projection of power into South America, would be impossible without control of a few harbours among the islands. Loss of a foothold in the Caribbean would have been a major blow, particularly to the French who had pretensions of being a major maritime power and had been planning to construct a large naval depot on the island of Tobago.

Because of their value and prestige, strategic significance and the growing possibility of civil unrest, both nations had taken steps to protect their possessions. The fragile peace, brought about by the Treaty of Amiens, was not expected to last and both sides had remained on a war footing throughout. When war was declared in May 1803, half of France's warships were already in the Caribbean, taking part in the Saint-Domingue expedition while Britain had nearly 10,000 men scattered among its West Indian colonies.

Although British forces in the area did not get official confirmation until the middle of June, they had received warnings as early as April that war was coming, and the Commander-in-chief Leeward Islands, Lieutenant-General William Grinfield, had readied 4,000 men for deployment at 24 hours notice. With the declaration, came orders for Grinfield to attack one or more of the French-held islands of Martinique, St Lucia and Tobago. Martinique was considered too well defended but Grinfield calculated that the capture of St Lucia would be possible. On 17th, Hood took steps to prevent further supplies being thrown into St Lucia by sending Captain James O'Brien in HMS Emerald to harass enemy shipping and disrupt the island's trade.

== Campaign ==
The invasion force left Barbados on 20 June. The naval force comprised Samuel Hood's 74-gun flagship HMS Centaur, the 74-gun Courageux, the frigates Argo and Chichester, (Note: Chichester had been converted for use as a troopship and was only lightly armed, carrying 22 12-pounder guns) and the sloops Hornet and Cyane. Aboard were the second battalion of the 1st Regiment of Foot, the 64th Regiment of Foot, 68th Regiment of Foot, and the 3rd West Indies Regiment, a total of 3,149 soldiers under the overall command of Grinfield. The following morning they were joined by the 36-gun frigate Emerald and the 18-gun sloop Osprey.

=== St Lucia and Tobago ===
By 11:00 on 21 June, the squadron was anchored in Choc Bay, to the north of Castries, where the bulk of Grinfield's force was landed under the direction of Captain Benjamin Hallowell of the Courageux. The wind was strong, making the rowing arduous but by 17:00, the troops were ashore, moving inland and driving the French outposts back towards the town, which capitulated at 17:30.

In the meantime, Hallowell had taken a detachment of seamen and marines to Gros Islet, to cut the route between the fort at Pigeon Island and St Lucia's main fortress, Morne-Fortunée. Following the fall of Castries, the French garrison at Morne-Fortunée was called on to surrender but the commanding officer, Brigadier Antoine Noguès, refused and at 04:00 the next morning therefore, the British stormed the walls with two columns led by Brigadier-General Thomas Picton. They suffered 130 casualties in the attack but by 04:30 the fort and the island were in British hands. French prisoners, amounting to 640, were sent back to France.

Following this relatively easy take over, it was decided to follow up with an attack on Tobago. The 68th Regiment and three companies of the 3rd West Indies Regiment were left to hold St Lucia while Hood's Centaur and some smaller vessels took Grinfield and the remainder. Tobago was captured on 1 July after the capital Scarborough had been occupied by two columns of Grinfield's soldiers. The French general, Berthier, had been briefed on the size of the force confronting him, and decided to capitulate without a fight. The island was garrisoned with eight companies from the 1st and one company from the 3rd West Indies regiments, and the expedition returned to Barbados.

=== Demerara, Essequibo and Berbice ===
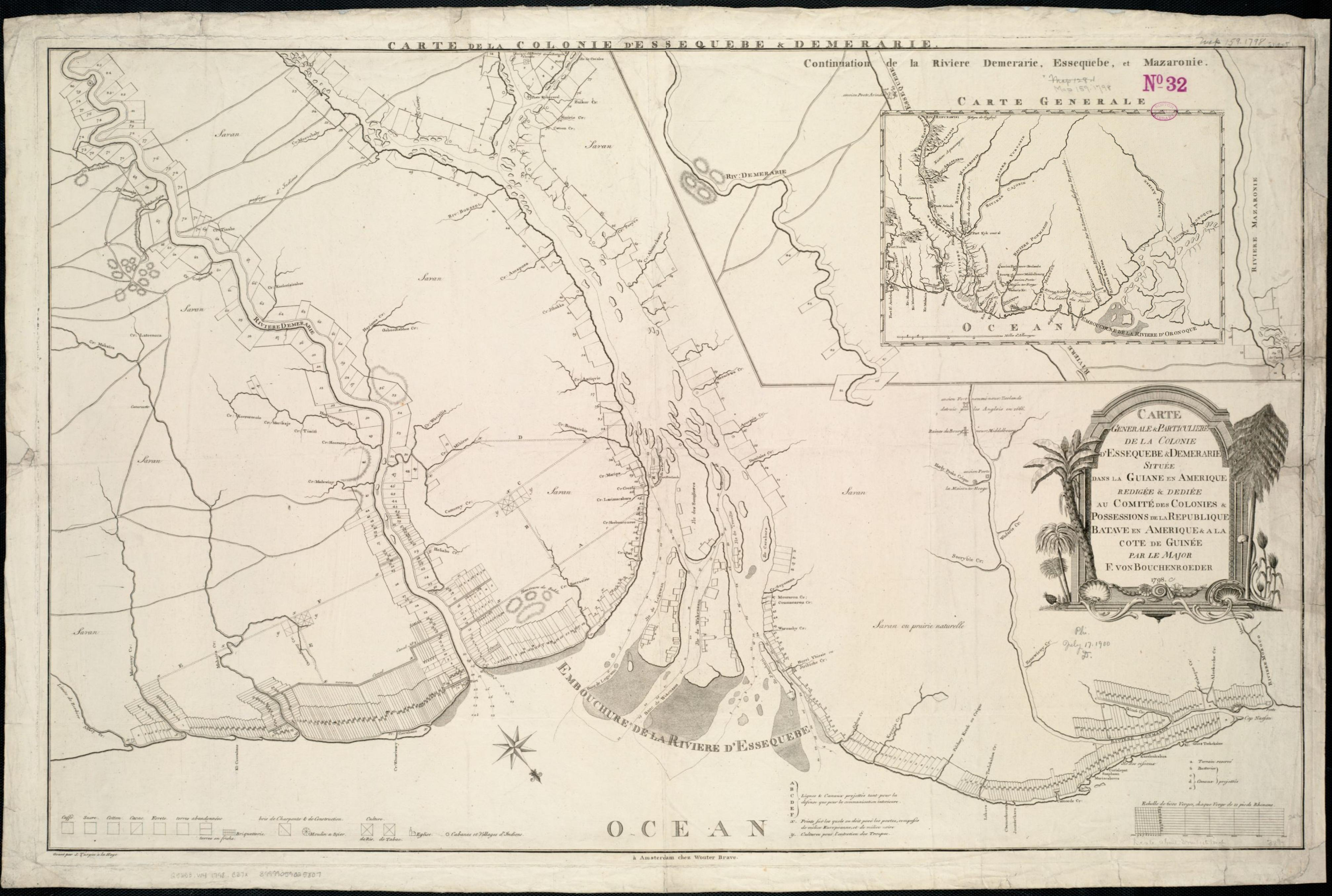
1798 map showing the Dutch colonies of Essequibo and Demarara

The colonies in South America, under the control of the Batavian Republic, had been visited by the French colonial governor Victor Hughes in early July, causing much apprehension among the Dutch planters. Recalling the 1794 invasion of Guadeloupe and alert to the possible carnage that might come to them, they requested a peaceful take over by the British. On 10 August, Grinfield received orders to call on the surrender of the colonies of Demerara, Essequibo and Berbice.

With much of the original expeditionary force now employed defending the new acquisitions, Grinfield requested that 5,000 more men be sent out to help. He was promised a battalion from Gibraltar but this did not arrive and after waiting in vain for reinforcements until the end of August, decided that he would have to make do with the troops at his disposal.

By supplementing his force with Royal Marines, Grinfield managed to amass 1300 men and on 1 September set out with Hood's squadron, comprising Centaur, the 16-gun troopship Alligator, (Note: Alligator was originally built as a 28-gun 9-pounder frigate of the Enterprise class, she was converted to a troopship in 1800.) Chichester, the transport ship Brilliant, (Note: Brilliant like Alligator was originally built as a 28-gun 9-pounder Enterprise-class frigate.) the 22-gun brig Heureux and the 16-gun sloop Netley. The expedition did not arrive at the rendezvous point, off the mouth of the Demerara River, until 18 September however, due to very light winds.

A summons was immediately dispatched to the Dutch governor at Georgetown, under a flag of truce. It demanded that the colonies be given up and in return full honours of war and parole for officers would be granted. Public stores, buildings and ships would be seized but private property and possessions would not. In the meantime Netley, carrying aboard someone who was familiar with the coastline, was sent off to scout and look for small boats that could be used during the operation. By early the next morning, 24 local boats had been gathered and troops were disembarked from Chichester (Note: Chichester was a large two-deck frigate of 901 90/94 bm. Although she never served as anything other than a 22-gun troopship, she was originally designed as a 44-gun ship, carrying batteries of 18-pounder long guns and 24-pound carronades.) and Centaur, which were too big to enter the river. The following day, 20 June, a Dutch party arrived and terms for the surrender were agreed. Hornet, which had been blockading the port, then sailed up the river with Netley, and 200 troops were landed who secured Fort William Frederick. Heureux took the 18-gun Hippomenes, a naval sloop belonging to the Batavian Republic, moored in the river there. The colonies of Demerara and Essequibo were given up at noon the next day.

The governor of Demerara and Essequibo, Antony Meertens, was however unable to treat for independently governed Berbice. Therefore, a separate deputation was sent, comprising Heureux, Alligator, Netley and a detachment of soldiers and marines aboard the transport ship Brilliant. The colony was eventually taken without a fight on 27 September. Of the 1500 men who made up the Dutch garrisons, half joined the British Army, forming their own regiment, the York Light Infantry Volunteers.
