= Caribbean campaign =

The Caribbean campaign may refer to:

- The West Indies campaign of the American Revolutionary War
- The Central American campaign of the American Revolutionary War
- The Caribbean campaign of 1803–1810 of the Napoleonic Wars
