= Admiral Henderson =

Admiral Henderson may refer to:

- George R. Henderson (1893–1964), U.S. Navy vice admiral
- Iain Henderson (Royal Navy officer) (born 1948), British Royal Navy rear admiral
- Nigel Henderson (1909–1993), British Royal Navy admiral
- Reginald Henderson (1881–1939), British Royal Navy admiral
- Reginald Friend Hannam Henderson (1846–1932), British Royal Navy admiral
- Robert Henderson (Royal Navy officer) (1778–1843), British Royal Navy rear admiral
- William Hannam Henderson (1845–1931), British Royal Navy admiral
- William Henderson (Royal Navy officer) (1788–1854), British Royal Navy rear admiral
