= Robert Henderson (Royal Navy officer) =

Rear-Admiral Robert Henderson
- Born: 1778; Aberdeen, Scotland
- Died: 14 January 1843 (aged 64–65); Aberdeen, Scotland
- Education: Marischal College
- Military career
- Allegiance: United Kingdom
- Branch: Royal Navy
- Service years: 1792–1843
- Rank: Rear-admiral
- Commands: HMS Guachapin; HMS Alligator; HMS Pheasant; HMS Agincourt; HMS Venus; HMS Champion; HMS Dublin; HMS Tigris
- Conflicts: French Revolutionary Wars; Napoleonic Wars; Caribbean campaign; Invasion of St Lucia; Invasion of Surinam (WIA); Invasion of Île de France

Rear-Admiral Robert Henderson (1778 – 14 January 1843) was an officer of the British Royal Navy who fought in several colonial actions and operations during his service in the French Revolutionary and Napoleonic Wars. Henderson served in small cruising warships in the West Indies during the early years of the Napoleonic Wars and took part in the invasion and capture of Saint Lucia in 1803 and operations off Trinidad in 1804. In 1810, Henderson commanded HMS Nereide at the Invasion of Île de France and was awarded a pension for his service which he retained until he became a retired admiral in 1838. He died in 1843.

== Military career ==
Henderson was born in 1778, the son of prominent naval officer Captain William Henderson of Aberdeen, an important landowner in Forfarshire. Educated at Marischal College, Henderson followed his father into the British Royal Navy in 1792 as a midshipman in HMS Southampton shortly before the outbreak of the French Revolutionary Wars. Serving during the war, Henderson became a lieutenant in 1799 aboard the sloop HMS Osprey and was still aboard her during the successful invasion of Saint Lucia in 1803. Later in the year, Osprey attacked a schooner off Trinidad and Henderson, who led the boarding party, was very seriously wounded. The following year, still on Osprey, Henderson led another boarding party that captured the French privateer Resource off Trinidad. For this service, Henderson was awarded a sword by the Lloyd's Patriotic Fund of London and moved to the ship of the line HMS Centaur.

Centaur was part of the fleet that captured the Dutch colony of Surinam in 1804, Henderson was leading a landing party that was caught in an explosion at one of the forts defending the colony and was so badly wounded that he was expected to die. For his services in this engagement, Henderson was promoted to commander and awarded a pension. Despite his wounds, Henderson returned to service and was promoted to post captain in 1805. From 1805 to 1806 he was in charge of HMS Pheasant.

In 1810 he took command of the newly captured frigate HMS Nereide at Rodriguez and formed part of the fleet that supported the Invasion of Île de France, which was successfully concluded on 3 December 1810. Henderson retired at the end of the war to his native Aberdeen but remained on the naval retired list, obtaining promotion to rear-admiral on 28 June 1838. He died in January 1843 aged 65.
