= Ranger (1791 ship) =

British merchant and slave ship 1797–1805

History

Great Britain
- Name: Ranger
- Launched: 1791, New Providence
- Captured: 29 August 1797; Circa May 1805

United States of America
- Name: Delaware
- Owner: Francis Bruel, Philadelphia
- Acquired: Circa May 1805 by purchase of a prize
- Captured: 17 November 1805

United Kingdom
- Name: Ranger
- Acquired: By purchase of a prize
- Fate: Last listed 1814

General characteristics
- Tons burthen: 1791: 105, or 107 (bm); 1796: 151, or 154, or 160 (bm)
- Sail plan: 1791: Brig; 1796: Ship
- Complement: 1793: 4; 1803: 23 or 24
- Armament: 1793: 10 × 4-pounder guns; 1794: 2 × 6-pounder guns; 1803: 14 × 4-pounder guns
- Notes: Built of live oak and cedar

Ranger was launched in 1791 in New Providence and immediately came to Britain. She generally traded between Liverpool and New Providence. She underwent grounding in 1795 and in 1796 her owners had her repaired, lengthened, and converted from a brig to a ship. A French privateer captured her in August 1797 after a single-ship action. In a process that is currently obscure, Ranger returned to British ownership circa 1799. She then became a West Indiaman. From 1803 on she became a Liverpool-based slave ship in the triangular trade in enslaved people. She made one complete voyage transporting enslaved people. Then French privateers captured her after she had embarked captives in West Africa but before she could deliver them to the West Indies. A United States citizen purchased her at Guadeloupe and renamed her Delaware. In 1805 the Royal Navy recaptured her. She was returned to her British owners who sailed her between Ireland and Newfoundland. She was last listed in 1814.

== Career ==
Ranger first appeared in Lloyd's Register (LR) in 1791.

Year	Master	Owner	Trade	Source & notes
1791	J.Walker	Thomas Moss	Liverpool–New Providence	LR

After the outbreak of war with France, Captain John Walker acquired a letter of marque on 16 May 1793. This was short lived. In 1794 Ranger had a new master who did not acquire a letter of marque, and a much reduced armament.

Year	Master	Owner	Trade	Source & notes
1794	J.Walker; J.Turnbull	Moss & Co.	Liverpool–New Providence	LR
1795	Turnbull; H.Jump	Moss & Co.	Liverpool–Bahamas	LR

In November 1795 Lloyd's List reported that Ranger, Jump, master, had gone on shore at the Isle of Man. She was on her way from Liverpool to Lisbon.

Year	Master	Owner	Trade	Source & notes
1796	H.Jump; J.Bell	Moss & Co.	Liverpool–Lisbon; London–San Domingo	LR
1797	J.Bell	Moss & Co.	London–Caicos	LR; lengthened & large repair 1796

== Capture ==
Lloyd's List reported in December 1797 that on 25 August 1797 a French privateer had captured Ranger, from Liverpool and New Providence to the Caicos, and taken her into Cape Francois. Captain Bell was killed in the two-hour engagement before Ranger struck.

In a process that is currently obscure, Ranger returned to British ownership circa 1799. She reappeared in the 1799 volume of Lloyd's Register.

Year	Master	Owner	Trade	Source
1799	J.M'Gee	Tierney & Co.	London–Martinique	LR
1800	J.M'Gee; E.Redman	Tierney & Co.	London–Martinique	LR
1801	E.Redman	Phynn & Co.	London–St Lucia	LR
1802	E.Redman; J.Bruce	Phynn & Co.	London–St Lucia	LR
1803	J.Bruce; T.Phillips	Phynn & Co.	London–St Lucia; Liverpool–Africa	LR

New owners in Liverpool put Ranger into the slave trade.

1st voyage transporting enslaved people (1803–1804): Captain Thomas Phillips acquired a letter of marque on 2 August 1803. He sailed from Liverpool on 28 April 1803. In 1803, 99 vessels sailed from English ports, bound for Africa to acquire and transport enslaved people; 83 of these vessels sailed from Liverpool.

Ranger acquired captives at Calabar. On 13 October she arrived at Trinidad with 189 captives. Phillips died on the voyage, probably before Ranger arrived at Trinidad. She left Trinidad for Liverpool on 1 December and arrived back there on 27 January 1804 with Elliot Arthy, master. She had left Liverpool with 24 crew members and had suffered no crew deaths on her voyage.

2nd voyage transporting enslaved people (1804–loss): Captain Archibald Holmes sailed from Liverpool on 29 April 1804. In 1804, 147 British ships, 128 from Liverpool, sailed on voyages to acquire and transport enslaved people.

=== Capture ===
In June 1805 Lloyd's List reported that two privateers had captured Ranger, Holmes, master, to the windward of Barbados. The privateers sent Ranger into Guadeloupe.

In 1805, 30 British enslaving ships were lost, 11 of them on their way from Africa to the West Indies. During the period 1793 to 1807, war, rather than maritime hazards or resistance by the captives, was the greatest cause of vessel losses among British enslaving vessels.

== Delaware ==
Francis Bruel, a United States citizen purchased Ranger in Guadeloupe and renamed her Delaware. On 17 November 1805 HMS Unique captured Delaware, George Pickle, master, some 10 miles from Guadeloupe as Delaware was sailing from Philadelphia to Guadeloupe. Pickle protested the capture, arguing that Delaware was a neutral vessel. The Vice admiralty court at Antigua on 16 December rejected the appeal. Documents submitted during the court case revealed that Delaware had been Ranger. Ranger was returned to her British owners.

== Ranger ==
Year	Master	Owner	Trade	Source & notes
1808	T.Phillips; Pugh	Weston & Co.	Liverpool–Africa; Waterford–Newfoundland	LR; lengthened 1796

== Fate ==
Ranger was last listed in Lloyd's Register in the volume for 1814, but with data unchanged since 1808.
