= Earl of Mornington (1766 ship) =

History

Great Britain
- Name: Earl of Mornington
- Namesake: Earl of Mornington
- Owner: Abbott & Co.
- Builder: Bombay Dockyard
- Launched: 1766

General characteristics
- Tons burthen: 500 or 600(bm)
- Propulsion: Sail
- Complement: 80
- Armament: 10 × 6-pounder guns, or 12 x 6 & 12-pounder guns

Earl of Mornington (or Earl Mornington), was a merchant vessel of 500 tons burthen (bm) built at Bombay Dockyard of teak and launched in 1766 or 1768. She made three voyages under charter to the British East India Company (EIC) under the command of captain Benjamin Ferguson. She does not appear in Lloyd's Register until 1804 and no longer appears in either Lloyd's Register or in the Register of Shipping in 1810.

== Career ==
Her first voyage for the EIC took place between 20 November 1799 and 22 August 1802. On this voyage she sailed to Bengal.

She was surveyed in 1802, possibly in Britain. She appeared on the Madras registry in 1803 with Benjamin Ferguson, master.

Her second voyage had her sailing from Madras on 24 January 1803, reaching St Helena on 14 April, and arriving at the Downs on 28 June. (Note: The British Library conflates this Earl of Mornington with another Earl of Mornington, listing the two vessels' voyages together under the name of the first.)

Ferguson received a letter of marque on 15 October 1803.

Her third voyage had Earl of Mornington sailing on 6 November 1803 for Madras, arriving on 16 May 1805.
