= Dutch frigate Proserpine (1801) =

History

Batavian Republic
- Name: Proserpine
- Builder: Amsterdam
- Launched: 1801
- Captured: 1805

United Kingdom
- Name: HMS Amsterdam
- Acquired: 5 May 1804 by capture
- Fate: Sold 1815

General characteristics
- Tons burthen: 849 (bm)
- Length: Overall:140 ft 8 in (42.9 m); Keel:113 ft 6 in (34.6 m)
- Beam: 37 ft 6 in (11.4 m)
- Depth of hold: 11 ft 11 in (3.6 m)
- Complement: 85 (as storeship)
- Armament: Upper deck: 20 × 24-pounder carronades; QD: 2 × 24-pounder carronades

Proserpine was launched at Amsterdam in 1801 as a 32-gun frigate. The Royal Navy captured her in May 1804 at the capture of Surinam and took her into service as HMS Amsterdam. She sailed to England where she became a guard and storeship at Cork. She was sold in 1815.

== Capture ==
The British captured Surinam from the Dutch on 5 May 1804. The Batavian flotilla that the British captured was under the command of naval Captain H. 0. Bloys Van Trestong, captain of Proserpine. The other naval vessels were the corvette Pilades, the schooner George (10 guns), and seven gunboats.

Prize money in the amount of £32,000 was paid in March 1808 to the officers and crew of the Royal Navy vessels involved in the capture of the colony of Surinam.

== Royal Navy ==
In December 1804, Amsterdam recaptured Horatio, of Liverpool, Lawson, master, that a French privateer had captured as Horatio was sailing from Africa to the West Indies with a cargo of slaves. Horatio was taken into Demerara, where she landed 114 slaves. The report in the London Gazette gives the slave ship's name as Lord Nelson. A report in Lloyd's List (LL) gave the vessel's name as Horatio, and also mentioned that the privateer had removed 160 of her people. A later report revealed that the privateer had taken out 160 of her slaves, along with her crew, excepting the carpenter, boatswain, and one or two seamen.

In May Captain Ferris was in command of Amsterdam and on 5 May she sailed from Antigua for England. She arrived at Spithead on 13 June and then went into Portsmouth Harbour. She was laid up in Ordinary there on 2 July. Her crew were distributed to HMS Namur and Royal William.

Between May and August 1806 Amsterdam underwent fitting as a storeship for Cork. Commander Alexander Innes commissioned her in May as a guardship at Cork. In June 1807 Commander Edward W. Hoare replaced Innes.

Amsterdam shared with Trent and the ship's tender Cecilia in the proceeds of the detention on 31 August 1807 of the Danish vessels Aurora and Brothers. Given that Trent was a hospital ship at Cork, the detention was certainly the work of Cecilia. (Note: Cecilia was a hired armed schooner of 18669/94 tons (bm) and eight 12-pounder carronades.)

In September 1809 Commander William Morce assumed command of Amsterdam. In May 1811 she was at Plymouth being fitted as a receiving ship. Between 1812 and 1814 she was in Ordinary at Plymouth.

== Fate ==
Amsterdam was sold at Plymouth on 9 August 1815 for £1,150.
