= HMS Surinam (1804) =

Sloop of the Royal Navy

History

United Kingdom
- Name: HMS Surinam
- Acquired: 5 May 1804 by capture
- Fate: Sold 1808

General characteristics
- Tons burthen: 413 (bm)
- Armament: 18 guns

HMS Surinam was the 18-gun Batavian corvette or sloop Pilades that the British captured on 5 May 1804 when they captured Surinam from the Dutch. The Batavian flotilla that the British captured was under the command of naval Captain Blots Van Treelong.

There already being a Pylades in service, the British renamed her Surinam when they took her into the Royal Navy. Little is known of the 413 tons burthen Pylades; the Dutch reported that she was an English vessel that they had captured at the beginning of the war, i.e., in 1803. When the British recaptured her, she had a crew of 39 men, including her captain.

The British commissioned Surinam under Commander Kenneth M'Kenzie, of Guachapin, but he transferred almost immediately to Hippomenes. His replacement was Commander Henry Waring, formerly captain of Serapis, which had been part of the naval squadron at the capture of Surinam. Surinam was paid off on 28 June 1804 and was sold in about 1808. One may surmise that Waring requested the transfer to Surinam to sail her back to England. He was married in London in April 1805.

Prize money in the amount of £32,000 was paid in March 1808 to the officers and crew of the Royal Navy vessels involved in the capture of the colony of Surinam.
