= HMS Semiramis (1808) =

Royal Navy warship

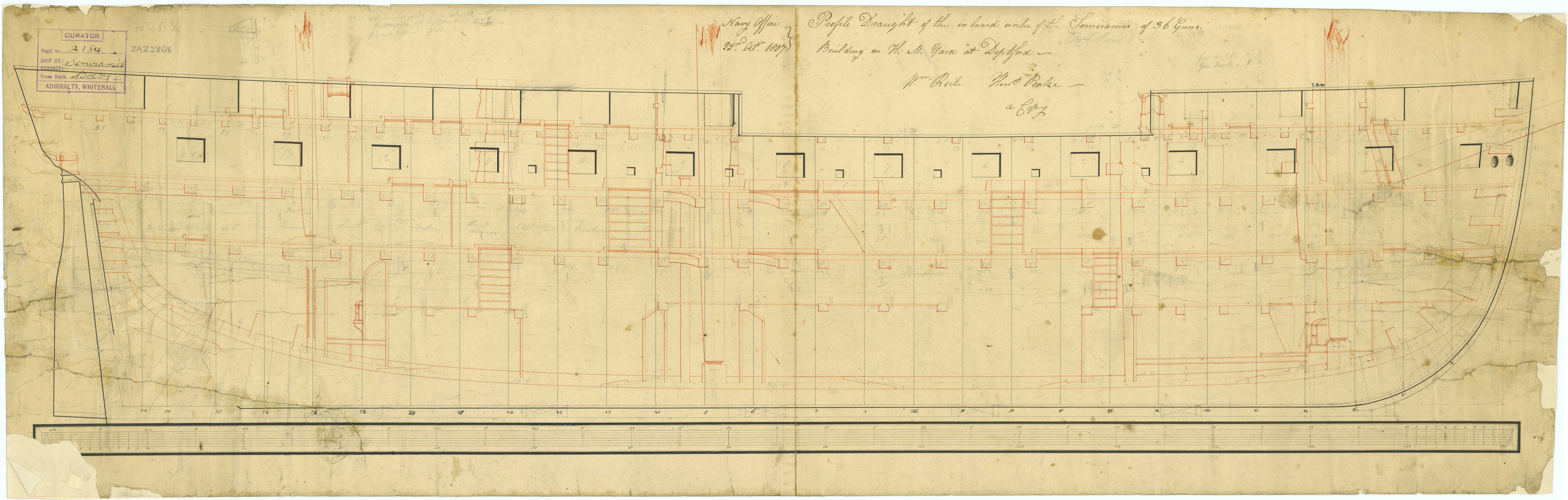
- HMS Semiramis inboard profile plan.

History

United Kingdom
- Name: HMS Semiramis
- Namesake: Semiramis, legendary Assyrian ruler
- Ordered: 25 March 1806
- Cost: £35,473
- Laid down: April 1807
- Launched: 25 July 1808
- Commissioned: 6 September 1808
- Fate: Broken up 1844

General characteristics
- Class & type: Apollo
- Type: Frigate
- Tons burthen: 944
- Beam: 38 ft 2 in
- Draught: 14 ft 4 in
- Depth of hold: 13 ft 3 in
- Armament: 36 guns; later reduced to 24

HMS Semiramis was a fifth-rate Royal Navy frigate during the Age of Sail. She was built at Deptford Dockyard, launched on 25 July 1808, and eventually broken up in 1844.

Charles Richardson captained HMS Semiramis between 1810 and 1814, (1823) during which time the ship destroyed the French 16-gun brig Le Pluvier and captured the 14-gun French privateer vessel Grand Jean Bart.

Captain Sir James Yeo was transferred to command HMS Semiramis in October 1817; he would die aboard in 1818 while returning to England from Jamaica.
