= Hector (1784 ship) =

History

Dutch Republic
- Name: Hector
- Builder: Amsterdam
- Launched: 1784
- Captured: 28 August 1799

Great Britain
- Name: HMS Pandour
- Acquired: 28 August 1799 by capture
- Fate: Sold

General characteristics
- Type: Frigate
- Tons burthen: 89439/94 (bm)
- Length: Overall: 134 ft 3 in (40.92 m); Keel: 108 ft 11 in (33.20 m)
- Beam: 39 ft 3 1/2 in (11.976 m)
- Depth of hold: 15 ft 2 in (4.62 m)
- Propulsion: Sails
- Complement: 294
- Armament: As frigate; Lower deck (LD): 20 × 12-pounder guns; Upper deck (UD): 22 × 9-pounder guns; QD: 2 × 9-pounder guns; As floating battery, 1804; LD: 20 × 24-pounder carronades; UD: 22 × 24-pounder carronades; QD: 4 × 24-pounder carronades; Fc: 2 × 9-pounder guns

Hector was a Dutch 44-gun frigate launched in 1784, that the British captured in 1799. They fitted her out and transferred her to the Transport Board in 1800, under the name Pandour. She then transported troops to and from Egypt. The Royal Navy commissioned her in 1803, as HMS Pandour; she then sailed to the Leeward Islands, where she participated in the capture of Surinam. The Navy converted her to a floating battery in 1804, and transferred her to Customs as a store hulk in 1805. She was sold in 1814.

== Career ==
The British captured Hector, and a number of other vessels, at the Nieuwe Diep during the Anglo-Russian invasion of Holland. The actual captor was HMS Circe, which took possession of 13 men-of-war in all, ranging in size from 66 guns to 24, and three Indiamen. She also took possession of the Naval Arsenal and its 95 pieces of ordnance.

Hector arrived at Sheerness on 30 April 1800. The Admiralty transferred her to the Transport Board on 26 May 1801, which had her fitted en flute at Woolwich between May and July to serve as a troopship. Commander John Shortland took command in June and sailed her to Egypt. (Note: It is not clear that Shortland was actually her captain. An account of his climbing Pompey's Pillar at Alexandria refers to him as "2nd of Pandour". A biography of Shortland states that his friend, Admiral Schank, a commissioner of the Transport Board, was able to get Shortland appointed to Pandour as agent of the troops then going to Egypt.) She may have arrived in time for the Siege of Alexandria, which was fought between 17 August and 2 September 1801. Pandour was still or again there in early February 1803, as the British troops were preparing to leave in March.

In 1803, after her return from Egypt, Pandour paid off. Then the Admiralty had her fitted for the defense of the Thames. On 15 September, she was at Portsmouth for the visit of the Prince of Wales and performed a maneuver. She then was commissioned in October under Captain John Nash. At the time the British were concerned about a French invasion and were making anti-invasion preparations. Still, Nash sailed Pandour for the Leeward Islands immediately after commissioning her.

On the morning of 13 March 1804, Fort Diamond, the tender to Diamond Rock, captured the French 10-gun privateer schooner Mosambique, which had anchored close to the shore under a battery at Ceron, outside the port of Saint-Pierre, Martinique. The capture took place with the cooperation of Emerald and Pandour, which sent two boats each that created a diversion. The Navy took Mosambique into service under her existing name.

On 24 April, Commodore Samuel Hood's squadron captured the Dutch colony at Surinam River. The squadron consisted of Hood's flagship Centaur, Emerald, Pandour, Serapis, Unique, Alligator, Hippomenes, and Drake, and was transporting 2000 troops under Brigadier-General Sir Charles Green. Both British and Dutch casualties were light, with Pandour suffering one man wounded. (Note: In February 1808, the members of the British force shared in a grant of £32,000, representing part of the proceeds from the capture of Surinam. A second grant of £16,000 followed in November.)

Pandour returned to Britain in October 1804. There she was fitted as a floating battery. However she was paid off in February 1805.

== Fate ==
The Admiralty transferred Pandour to the Customs for service as a store hulk. At some point the Admiralty regained control and offered her for sale at Portsmouth on 13 May 1814, though the vessel was lying at Scilly "with her masts and yards only".
