= HMS Unique (1804) =

History

France
- Name: Harmonie
- Captured: January 1804

United Kingdom
- Name: HMS Unique
- Acquired: January 1804
- Captured: January 1806

General characteristics
- Type: schooner
- Tons burthen: 120 (bm)
- Length: 74 ft 0 in (22.6 m) (overall); c.53 ft 0 in (16.2 m) (keel)
- Beam: 20 ft 8 in (6.3 m)
- Depth of hold: 7 ft 4 in (2.2 m)
- Propulsion: Sails
- Sail plan: Schooner
- Armament: 10 or 12 guns

HMS Unique was the French 12-gun schooner Harmonie that Cyane captured from the French in 1804. A French privateer recaptured and sank Unique in 1806.

== Capture ==
On 27 January Cyane captured Harmonie at 15°23′N 60°30′W. Captain Joseph Nourse of Cyane reported that Harmonie was armed with 12 guns and had a crew of 82 men. She was 34 days out of Guadeloupe and had taken one prize, the Scottish ship Mercury, which was carrying a cargo of lumber and provisions to Demerara via New York. However, Hippomenes had recaptured Mercury on 26 January.

== British service ==
The Royal Navy took Harmonie into service as HMS Unique. Lieutenant James Baird commissioned her at Barbados for the Leeward Islands. Lieutenant George Rowley Brand replaced Baird within the year.

Unique formed part of Commodore Samuel Hood's squadron at the capture of Surinam River in 1804. The squadron consisted of Hood's flagship Centaur, Pandour, Serapis, Alligator, Hippomenes, Drake, and transports carrying 2000 troops under Brigadier-General Sir Charles Green. Lieutenant Brand went on shore, as did a number of other naval personnel, to participate in the attack. British and Dutch casualties were light, but Brand was severely wounded in the attack on the Dutch shore battery at Fredericki. (Note: In February 1808, the members of the British force shared in a grant of £32,000, representing part of the proceeds from the capture of Surinam. A second grant of £16,000 followed in November.)

On 17 November 1805 Unique captured the United States vessel Delaware some 10 miles from Guadeloupe. George Pickle, Delaware's master, appealed the capture. Testimony before the Vice admiralty court in Antigua revealed that Delaware had been the British slave ship Ranger, which a French privateer had captured circa May 1805 and taken into Guadeloupe. Francis Bruel, of Philadelphia, had purchased Ranger and renamed her Delaware. On 16 December 1805 the Court rejected the appeal with the respect to the vessel, letting the capture stand. Ranger was returned to her British owners.

== Loss ==
On 23 January 1806 Unique encountered a large French privateer. An engagement followed during which Brand was killed. Unique foundered shortly after she surrendered. One mention of the action reports that the French vessel had twice the armament of Unique, and that the British schooner sank with her colours still flying. Brand was reportedly killed while leading an attempt to board the French vessel. All the other British officers also died in the action.

The French buried Brand at Guadeloupe with military honours in "admiration of such bravery". Lloyd's Patriotic Fund awarded Mr. Alexander Brand, George Brand's father, with a grant of 300 guineas in recognition of the lieutenant's service. In his career in the Royal Navy Brand had sustained more than 30 wounds.
