= Earl of Mornington (1799 ship) =

1799 packet ship

History

Great Britain
- Name: Earl of Mornington
- Owner: East India Company
- Builder: Perry, Wells & Green, Blackwall Yard
- Launched: 24 January 1799
- Fate: Sold February 1804

United Kingdom
- Name: HMS Drake
- Acquired: Purchased February 1804
- Commissioned: October 1804
- Fate: Broken up 1808

General characteristics
- Class & type: East Indiaman
- Tons burthen: 241, 253, or 25317/94 (bm)
- Length: 104 ft 0 in (31.7 m) (overall); 79 ft 3 in (24.2 m) (keel)
- Beam: 24 ft 6 in (7.5 m)
- Complement: East India Company: 35 men; Royal Navy:75
- Armament: East India Company: Pierced for 14 but carrying 8 × 12-pounder guns; Royal Navy: 16 × 18-pounder carronades

Earl of Mornington (or Earl Mornington) was a packet ship launched in 1799 for the British East India Company (EIC). She performed one voyage for the Company, sailing from England to India and returning. The Admiralty purchased her in 1804 and she then served the Royal Navy until she was broken up in 1808.

== East India Company ==
It is not clear for which Earl of Mornington she was named, but it was probably Richard Wellesley.

One contemporary source states that Earl of Mornington made only one voyage for the EIC. (Note: The British Library gives data for two voyages, but this seems to be an error. The first voyage is for the correct vessel. The second voyage is almost surely for the larger (500 tons (bm)) and older India-built vessel Earl of Mornington.) Her captain was George Simpson, who received a letter of marque on 7 October 1799. At the time her armament was recorded as eight 12-pounder guns.

Lloyd's Register for 1800 records Earl Mornington, 253 tons (bm), Simpson, master, East India Company, owner, and trade London-India. This description continues unchanged through 1804.

She left Britain on 20 November 1799 and arrived at Calcutta on 22 April 1800. She left Kedgeree on 5 November. By 12 May 1801 she had reached Simon's Bay, but then on 8 August she was back at Calcutta. On 11 March 1802 she left Culpee, an anchorage towards Calcutta and closer than Saugor. From there she reached St Helena on 28 June and arrived at the Downs on 19 August.

Apparently Earl Mornington sailed again in 1802. She was reported to be at St Helena on 10 June 1803, returning from the South Seas.

== Naval service ==
In 1804 the Admiralty purchased her for the Royal Navy and named her HMS Drake. (Note: Reports exist that the Navy renamed her Mornington and sold her shortly after purchasing her.) She was commissioned in October 1804 under Commander William H. Drury.

Drake formed part of Commodore Hood's squadron at the capture of Surinam River in 1804. The squadron consisted of Hood's flagship Centaur, Pandour, Serapis, Alligator, Hippomenes, Unique, and transports carrying 2000 troops under Brigadier-General Sir Charles Green. British and Dutch casualties were light. (Note: In February 1808, the members of the British force shared in a grant of £32,000, representing part of the proceeds from the capture of Surinam. A second grant of £16,000 followed in November.)

Drake sailed to Jamaica on 12 April 1805. On 1 November 1805 William Furlong Wise was promoted to Commander into Drake. He was the nephew of James Richard Dacres, the admiral commanding the station. In April Wise transferred to Elk. (Note: Elk had been under the command of Wise's cousin, Commander James Dacres.)

In 1806 Drake came under the command of Commander F. Mere. However, she was under the command of Robert Nicholas when on 26 October she assisted in cornering the French privateer Superbe, which the schooner Pitt, under the command of Lieutenant Michael Fitton was engaging. Superbe's captain then drove her ashore at Ocoa Bay, enabling he and his surviving crew members to escape.

Nicholas's replacement in November 1806 was Commander John Parish. In October 1807 Commander George Bell replaced Parish; by 1808 she was under the command of Lieutenant John Fleming (acting)

== Fate ==
She was broken up at Sheerness in 1808.
