= HMS Alligator (1787) =

Enterprise-class Royal Navy frigate

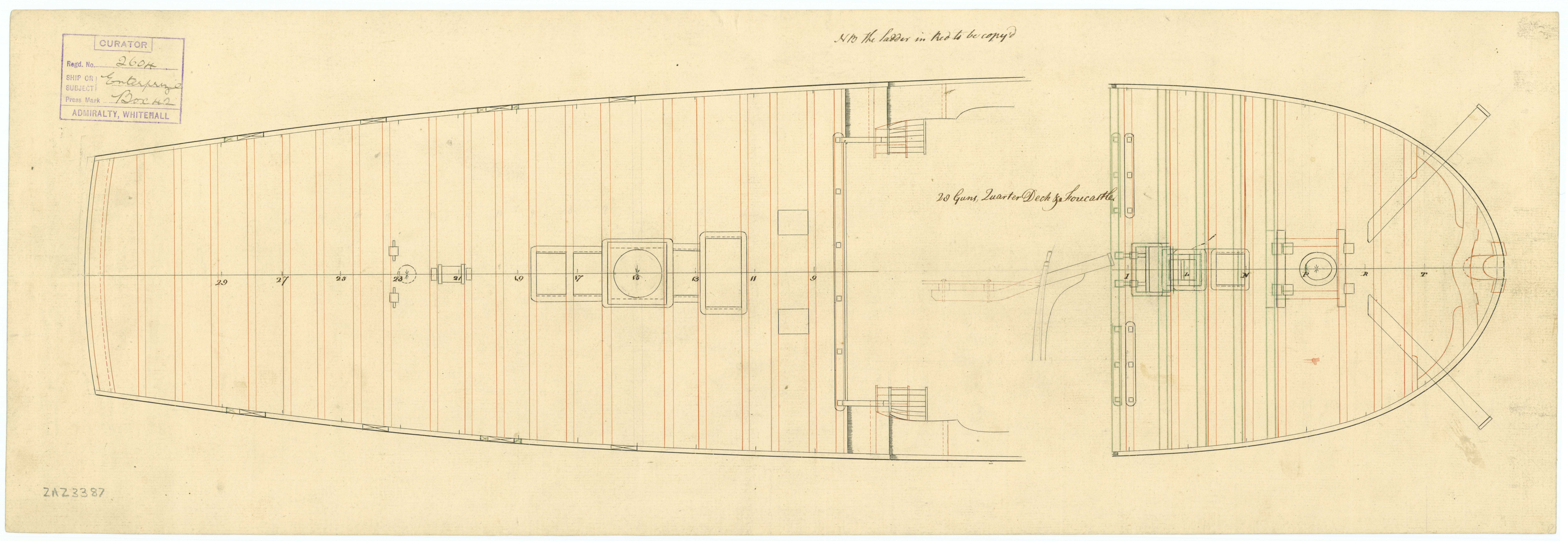
- Plan showing the quarterdeck and forecastle of the Alligator

History

Great Britain
- Name: HMS Alligator
- Ordered: 7 May 1782
- Builder: Philemon Jacobs, Sandgate
- Laid down: December 1782
- Launched: 18 April 1787
- Completed: By 18 July 1790
- Honours and awards: Naval General Service Medal with clasp "Egypt"
- Fate: Sold on 21 July 1814

General characteristics
- Class & type: 28-gun Enterprise-class sixth rate frigate
- Tons burthen: 59942/94 bm
- Length: 120 ft 6 in (36.7 m) (overall); 99 ft 5 in (30.3 m) (keel)
- Beam: 33 ft 7 1/2 in (10.2 m)
- Depth of hold: 11 ft (3.35 m)
- Sail plan: Full-rigged ship
- Complement: 200
- Armament: Upper deck: 24 × 9-pounder guns; QD: 4 × 6-pounder guns + 4 × 18-pounder carronades; Fc: 2 × 18-pounder carronades

HMS Alligator was a 28-gun Enterprise-class sixth rate frigate of the Royal Navy. She was originally ordered during the American War of Independence but was completed too late to see service during the conflict. Instead she had an active career during the French Revolutionary and Napoleonic Wars.

Commissioned during the last few years of peace prior to the outbreak of war with France, Alligator served in British waters, making trips as far afield as the Mediterranean and the North American coast. During the period of conflict that began in 1793, Alligator spent a considerable amount of time in the West Indies under a number of commanders and was effective in anti-privateer operations. Despite this she was laid up for a period starting in 1795 and was reduced to a 16-gun troopship in 1800. Further service followed in the West Indies, supporting the fleet and army movements around the islands, and taking part in the capture of several French frigates. She was again laid up, and as the end of hostilities approached, was deemed surplus and was sold in 1814.

== Construction and commissioning ==
Alligator was one of the third batch of Enterprise-class ships to be ordered by the Admiralty, with the contract to build her being awarded to Philemon Jacobs, of Sandgate on 7 May 1782. She was laid down there in December 1782 and launched on 18 April 1787. With there being no immediate need for a large number of ships in the navy after the end of the war with the United States, Alligator was gradually completed between 20 April 1787 and 18 July 1790, at first at Deptford Dockyard and then at the civilian yards of Randall & Co, at Rotherhithe. She cost a total of £2,771 with £4,330 spent on fitting costs and expenses incurred at Deptford. She commissioned under her first commander, Captain Isaac Coffin in June 1790.

== Interwar years ==
Coffin commissioned Alligator during the period of tensions known as the Spanish Armament and commanded her over the three years leading up to the outbreak of war with Revolutionary France. At one point, while Alligator was anchored at the Nore, one of her crew fell overboard. Coffin jumped into the water to rescue him, and succeeded in recovering the man before he drowned, but in doing so experienced a serious rupture while carrying out the rescue, that would dog him in later life. From the Nore Coffin moved to Spithead, and then to Ceuta, where Alligator briefly carried the flag of Admiral Philip Cosby. Superseded by the arrival of HMS Fame, Alligator was sent to cruise off Western Ireland. In 1792 Coffin sailed to Canada and returned carrying Lord Dorchester. Alligator then underwent a refit at Deptford for £2,895 and recommissioned in December 1792.

== French Revolutionary Wars ==
From February 1793 her commander was Captain William Afleck, who served briefly in the North Sea, achieving success against French privateers in the region. On 12 February 1793 he captured the Sans Peur, followed by the Prend Tout on 21 February. Afleck left Britain bound for the Leeward Islands on 18 March 1793.

He stopped at Halifax, where the schooner Diligent joined him. From there they sailed, with three transports carrying an artillery detachment and 310 troops primarily from the 4th Regiment of Foot, all under the command of Brigadier General James Ogilvie, to St Pierre and Miquelon on 7 May. They captured Saint Pierre on 14 May without firing a shot. They also captured 18 small vessels carrying fish, and two American schooners with provisions and naval stores. Trepassey joined them a day later and then sailed to Miquelon to complete the conquest. Prize money for the capture of the islands was paid in October 1796.

On 11 December 1793, Alligator captured the French ship Triomphant in St Marks Bay, in the island of Hispaniola. Next, Alligator captured the French 14-gun Liberté near Jamaica on 28 March 1794. On 14 June, Alligator was among the vessels that participated in the capture of Port-au-Prince. In October that year command passed to Captain Thomas Surridge. Captain Thomas Afleck succeeded Surridgein January 1795 and paid Alligator off the following month.

Alligator was laid up at Portsmouth for five years, until being refitted there as a 16-gun troopship between February and March 1800. She was recommissioned in February under Captain George Bowen, under whom she took part in operations off Egypt during the French campaign there. While supporting the landing of troops in Abu Qir Bay had one man killed and three wounded. On 17 July she recaptured the Anchor. Because Alligator served in the navy's Egyptian campaign between 8 March 1801 and 2 September, her officers and crew qualified for the clasp "Egypt" to the Naval General Service Medal that the Admiralty authorised in 1850 to all surviving claimants. (Note: A first-class share of the prize money awarded in April 1823 was worth £34 2s 4d; a fifth-class share, that of a seaman, was worth 3s 11½d. The amount was small as the total had to be shared between 79 vessels and the entire army contingent.)

Captain Philip Beaver took over command in May 1802. He remained Alligator's captain until she was recommissioned in May the following year under Commander Charles Richardson.

In April 1803, however, Alligator was sailing from Gibraltar to Britain in company with Dragon and the store ship Prévoyante when they sighted two French ships of the line off Cape St. Vincent. The French ships veered off rather than engage the British vessels. Later that year Alligator went out to the Leeward Islands and on 27 September was one of a number of ships that captured the 18-gun Dutch ship Hippomenes at Demerara. (Note: Alligator was among the vessels that in July 1811 shared in a grant of £6000, which was the first portion of the "booty, etc.", taken at Demarara, Essquibo, and Berbice. The second grant, of £3000, was paid in March 1812. The fourth and final payment occurred in July 1815. A first-class share of the prize money was worth £74 2s 6d; a fifth-class share, that of an able seaman, was worth 12s 4¼d.)

== Napoleonic Wars ==
Commander Robert Henderson was in command between 1804 and 1805, during which time Alligator was one of several ships to chase down and capture the 32-gun Proserpine at Surinam on 6 May 1804.

Alligator formed part of Commodore Samuel Hood's squadron at the capture of Surinam River in 1804. The squadron consisted of Hood's flagship Centaur, Pandour, Serapis, Unique, Hippomenes, Drake, and transports carrying 2000 troops under Brigadier-General Sir Charles Green. Both British and Dutch casualties were light. (Note: In February 1808, the members of the British force shared in a grant of £32,000, representing part of the proceeds from the capture of Surinam. A second grant of £16,000 followed in November.)

In November, Alligator recaptured from a French privateer the Danish brig Hoff, which was carrying a cargo of slaves. On 24 June 1805, Alligator captured the Spanish brig Santo Chritle, which was carrying brandy from Spain to Havanna.

Henderson was succeeded by Commander Augustus Collier in 1806, who returned her to the Leeward Islands. There in March 1806 she came under the command of Captain Hugh Pigot.

== Fate ==
Captain Robert Bell Campbell replaced Pigot from 1807. Campbell returned Alligator to Britain, where she was laid up at Plymouth in April 1807. She was offered for sale there on 21 July 1814 as the Napoleonic Wars drew to a close. She was sold that day for the sum of £1,760.
