= HMS Hippomenes =

Sloop of the Royal Navy

History

Batavian Republic
- Name: Hippomenes
- Builder: Vlissingen (Flushing)
- Laid down: 1796
- Launched: 1797
- Captured: 20 September 1803

United Kingdom
- Name: HMS Hippomenes
- Acquired: 20 September 1803 by capture
- Fate: Broken up 1813

General characteristics
- Tons burthen: 407 (bm)
- Length: 95 ft 10 1/2 in (29.223 m) (gundeck); 85 ft (26 m) (keel) (Note: For measurement in Amsterdam feet see van Maanen. The Amsterdam foot (voet) of 11 Amsterdam inches (duim) is about 8% shorter than an English foot (see Dutch units of measurement).)
- Beam: 30 ft 1 in (9.17 m)
- Depth of hold: 7 ft 5 1/2 in (2.273 m)
- Sail plan: Full-rigged ship
- Complement: 121 (British service)
- Armament: Dutch service: 10 × long 12-pounder guns + 2 × long 8-pounders + 2 × 24-pounder carronades; British Service: Upper deck: 16 × 32-pounder carronades; Fc: 2 × 9-pounder guns

HMS Hippomenes was a former Dutch corvette built in Vlissingen in 1797 for the Batavian Republic. The British captured her in 1803 and she served with the Royal Navy until sold in 1813. With the Royal Navy she participated in two notable single-ship actions in the West Indies.

== Dutch service ==
Hippomenes was a sister ship to Atalanta, but brig-rigged and built in 1796. Scorpion captured Atalanta in 1804 but the British did not take her into service. The two sister ships were named for Atalanta and Hippomenes, two lovers from Greek mythology.

Early in 1802, Hippomenes, under the command of Captain-Lieutenant Melvill, was assigned to the West Indies and Guinea coast division of the Batavian Republic's navy. After the end of the French Revolutionary Wars, the British returned the Dutch colonies they had captured in the West Indies to the Republic. In August 1802, Captain Cornelius Hubertus Buchman, of Kenau Hasselar, took a small squadron that also included the frigate Proserpina, Hippomenes, the cutter Rose, and the schooner Serpent, to take possession of Curaçao. Kenau Hasellar and Rose arrived at Willemstad on 22 December. The other vessels in the squadron sailed to other destinations.

== Capture ==
In the summer of 1803 Hippomenes was acting as a guard ship at Fort Stabroek, Georgetown, Demerara. She was responsible for the Governor's maritime affairs, served as harbour master for visiting ships, and was under the command of Lieutenant Sistermans.

When Commodore Sir Samuel Hood arrived to take command in the Leeward Islands, he raised his pennant in the 74-gun third rate Centaur. This ship of the line seized Hippomenes on 20 September 1803 at the taking of Demerara. Hippomenes was the only vessel there belonging to the Batavian Republic and so was included in the terms of capitulation. Initial reports described her as a corvette of 18 guns, perhaps because she was pierced for 18, though only 14 were mounted.

== British service ==
The British then took her to Antigua where they added her to the Navy as the 18-gun sloop-of-war HMS Hippomenes. This entailed the replacement of her 14 Dutch guns, which were incompatible with British requirements—Dutch 8-pounders, in particular, could not take Royal Navy ammunition—with 18 British guns. (Note: Aspinall reports that two of Hippomenes's 18-pounder went to fortifying Diamond Rock, which took place in early 1804. This is inconsistent with her armament either in Dutch or British service. Actually, Hippomenes brought the two 18-pounders from the Gun Wharf at English Harbour, Antigua.)

Her first British commander was Lieutenant John C. Woolcombe. On 26 January 1804, Hippomenes recaptured the Scottish ship Mercury, which was carrying a cargo of lumber to Demerara via New York. The French 12-gun privateer schooner Harmonie had captured Mercury before herself falling prey to Cyane on 27 January; Harmonie was taken into British service as HMS Unique.

Conway Shipley transferred from Saint Lucia and took command of Hippomenes on 22 March 1804. On 25 March 1804, he and the 18-gun sloop Osprey retook the French prize Rigby, which was carrying troops. More importantly for subsequent developments, they also recaptured the Reliance, out of London. From her Shipley obtained information about the whereabouts of the French privateer Egyptienne (the former frigate Railleuse).

Two days later, after a 54-hour chase, and a running fight of over 3 hours, Hippomenes captured Egyptienne. The French vessel struck her colours as soon as Hippomenes pulled alongside, with the result that the British suffered only one man wounded. A few days earlier, on 23 March, Egyptienne had battled Osprey, losing eight men killed and 19 men wounded before she could escape. Apparently this demoralized her captain so that when faced with yet another British warship he surrendered without putting up strong resistance. (Osprey had lost one man killed and 16 wounded.) Egyptienne had 36 guns (12 and 9-pounders) and a crew of 240 men when captured; when she battled Osprey her crew had been about 250 men. The British took Egyptienne into service as Antigua. Antigua served as a prison ship until she was scrapped in 1816.

Hippomenes formed part of Commodore Hood's squadron at the capture of Surinam River in 1804. The squadron consisted of Hood's flagship Centaur, Pandour, Serapis, Alligator, Hippomenes, Drake, the schooner Unique, and transports carrying 2000 troops under Brigadier-General Sir Charles Green. On 24 April, Hippomenes escorted a convoy carrying a division of the army under Brigadier-General Frederick Maitland to land at Warappa creek to collect enough boats from the plantations to transport troops to the rear of Fort New Amsterdam.

On 30 April, Kenneth Mackenzie (or M'Kenzie) of the 16-gun, ex-French privateer brig Guachapin, who had left his ship 50 leagues to leeward and brought up her boats, assisted Shipley in superintending the landing of Maitland's troops at Warappa. The Dutch governor initially rejected the surrender terms but surrendered on 5 May after the British captured the battery of Friderici. Hood made Shipley post-captain into Centaur. (One day earlier the Admiralty had promoted him into the ex-French 28-gun frigate HMS Sagesse; he later assumed command of her at Jamaica.)

On 1 May Hippomenes and Emerald captured the sloop Lizard and her cargo.

In June, Mackenzie took over command of Hippomenes, whose crew, he complained, consisted mainly of discontented foreigners. When the British had commissioned her, Shipley had to get men for her crew by drawing on other vessels, which gave the commanders of those vessels an opportunity to rid themselves of "skulkers, raw hands, incorrigible rogues and foreign renegades".

The poor quality of the crew came to the fore on 21 June when Hippomene was cruising off Antigua. Taking advantage of Hippomenes' Dutch design, Mackenzie had disguised her as a Guinea trader. The Guadeloupe privateer Buonaparte, of 18 long 8-pounders and a crew of 146 men, sighted Hippomenes and sailed to take her. The two vessels exchanged fire until Buonaparte ran into Hippomenes. Mackenzie had his crew lash the privateer's bowsprit to the mainmast and jumped on board the privateer, followed by his officers and a few men, some 18 in all. Unfortunately, the rest of the crew remained behind. In the fight on the privateer, the British lost five dead and eight wounded; only nine of the original 18 managed to escape back to Hippomenes (two officers and two men remained on board Buonaparte as prisoners). The boarding party barely got back in time before the lashings gave way and the vessels parted, at which time the privateer sailed away. On Hippomenes his wounds rendered Mackenzie himself senseless for a while. In the engagement prior to the boarding, the Buonaparte had lost five dead and 15 wounded.

During August 1804, Hippomenes, retook the British ship Young Nicholas, which was laden with mahogany. In 1805 Hippomenes was under the command of Commander William Autridge. By 11 November Commander Edward Woolcombe, who had been promoted out of Centaur, was listed as commanding Hippomenes at the capture of the brig Hiram. Hipomenes was part of a flotilla that received credit.

On 24 January 1807, a court martial acquitted Woolcombe of "wasteful expenditure of His Majesty's stores".

On 27 March 1808 the boats of Hippomenes joined those of Ulysses, Castor, and Morne Fortunee in an attempt to cut out the 16-gun French brig Griffon at Marin, Martinique. They succeeded in capturing a battery but were driven back empty handed, having suffered heavy casualties from the brig's fire.

In June 1808 Commander K.H. Waede took command of Hippomenes at Barbados, somewhat to his dismay, as he had been appointed to command Julia, a new vessel, the news arriving too late. Hippomenes then escorted a convoy to England.

== Fate ==
On 25 September 1808 Hippomenes arrived in Portsmouth and was laid up. The "Principal Officers and Commissioners of His Majesty's Navy" first offered the sloop Hippmenes, of 417 tons, then lying at Portsmouth, for sale 27 November 1811. She finally sold on 28 April 1813 for £600.
