= HMS Serapis (1782) =

1782 ship of the Royal Navy

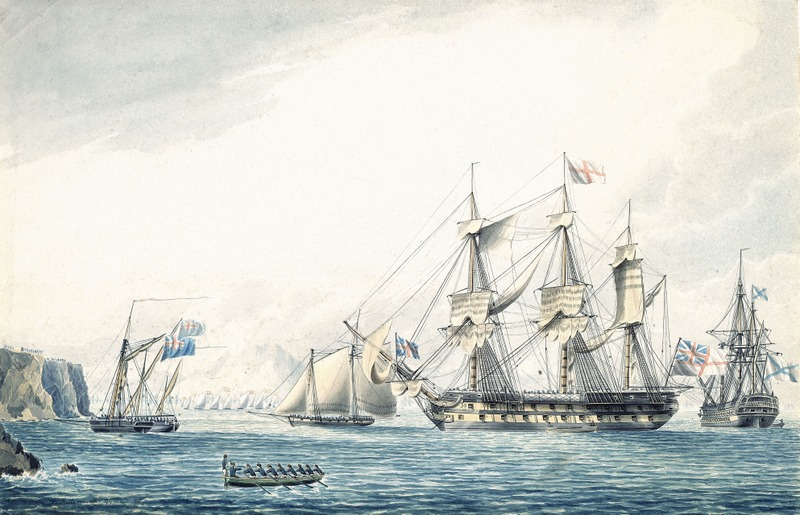
- Serapis' sister ship HMS Argo

History

Great Britain
- Name: HMS Serapis
- Ordered: 13 July 1780
- Builder: James Martin Hillhouse
- Cost: £21,746.9.3d
- Laid down: May 1781
- Launched: 7 November 1782
- Completed: December 1782
- Fate: Sold

General characteristics
- Class & type: Roebuck class Fifth-rate
- Tons burthen: 886 46/94 (bm)
- Length: 140 feet 2 1/2 inches (42.7 m) (gundeck); 115 feet 5 inches (35.2 m) (keel)
- Beam: 38 feet 0 inches (11.6 m)
- Depth of hold: 16 feet 4 1/2 inches (5 m)
- Propulsion: Sails
- Sail plan: Fully-rigged ship
- Complement: 300
- Armament: Lower deck: 20 × 18-pounder guns; Upper deck: 22 × 12-pounder guns; Quarterdeck: nil; Forecastle: 2 × 6-pounder guns

HMS Serapis was a fifth-rate ship of the Roebuck class designed by Sir Thomas Slade for use in the shallow coastal waters around North America. She was ordered for the Royal Navy in 1780, during the American Revolutionary War, and was 886 46/94 tons (bm) as built. When fully armed, she would have a battery of 20 × 18-pounder (8.2 kg) long guns on the lower deck and 22 × 12-pounder (5.4 kg) guns on the upper deck, but much of her service was as a transport or storeship, carrying only the 12-pounder guns on her upper deck.

Her first commission was brief, lasting from December 1782 to April 1783, and she did not serve again until the French Revolutionary War, when she was fitted as a storeship and sent to the West Indies. Following a spell in the Mediterranean, Serpais returned home with sick and injured on 24 May 1797, where she was immediately caught up in the fleet mutiny at the Nore. Unwilling participants, the crew slipped the anchor and drifted away undercover of darkness on 5 June.

In March 1804, Serapis was part of the invasion force that captured the Dutch colony of Surinam. In 1807, Serapis was in the Mediterranean. She sailed for the Cape in April 1808 but by 1809, she was back in the North Sea, and took part in the Walcheren expedition between 30 July and 16 August that year. Serapis made further trips to the Mediterranean and West Indies, serving as a convalescent ship in Jamaica and a prison hospital in Bermuda. She was sold in July 1826.

== Construction and armament ==
HMS Serapis was a fifth-rate warship of the Royal Navy designed by Sir Thomas Slade to operate in the shallow coastal waters of North America. A resurrection of Slade's 1769 pattern for HMS Roebuck, launched in 1774. Serapis was one of nineteen Roebuck-class ships, and the second one of that name; the first Serapis having been captured in 1781.

The Admiralty ordered Serapis on 13 July 1780 and work began in the May following, when her keel was laid down at the yard of James Martin Hillhouse in Bristol.

Launched on 7 November 1782, her dimensions were: 140 feet 2 1/2 inches (42.7 m) along the gun deck, 115 feet 5 inches (35.2 m) at the keel, with a beam of 38 feet 0 inches (11.6 m) and a depth in the hold of 16 feet 4 1/2 inches (5 m). This made her 886 46/94 tons (bm). She would have a complement of 300 men when fully manned.

The two-deck ship was intended to carry a battery 20 × 18-pounder (8.2 kg) long guns on the lower deck, 22 × 12-pounder (5.4 kg) guns on the upper deck and two 6-pounder (2.7 kg) the quarterdeck, but much of her time was spent as a transport or store ship; her lower guns removed and only her upper guns in situ.

== Service ==
Serapis was first commissioned under Captain Charles Everitt and completed in December 1782. She paid off in April 1783, shortly after the new government of Charles Watson-Wentworth, 2nd Marquess of Rockingham had begun negotiations to terminate the war in America, and would not see service again until the French Revolutionary War. In August 1794, work began at Chatham, converting Serapis for use as a storeship and in December, she was recommissioned under Master and Commander, Charles Duncan. The fitting had cost £6,210. She was sent to the West Indies in the August following, returning to home waters two months later. In September 1796, she travelled to the Mediterranean.

Carrying prisoners of war and the sick and injured from the Mediterranean fleet, Serapis returned home from Lisbon on 24 May 1797, where she was immediately caught up in the fleet mutiny at the Nore. The ship was forced to hove to under the guns of HMS Sandwich and a delegate of mutineers were sent aboard. The crew of the Serapis were moderates who did not want to join and only had minor complaints about the time taken to receive their wages. Nevertheless, only the sick were allowed to leave; ferried to the naval hospital at Sheerness in small boats.

At 23:00, on the night of 5 June, as support for the mutiny was waning, Serapis slipped her anchor and made for Sheerness undercover of darkness. She came under fire but had timed her escape to when the tide had brought most of the fleet stern on, making broadsides impossible. Serapis was out of danger by just after midnight on 6 June, having just one man injured. Duncan, and the captains and crews of other escaped ships, received a letter of thanks from the committee assembled to thwart the mutiny.

Following a spell at Woolwich in 1798, Serapis was serving on the Lisbon and Gibraltar stations by October. After further service in the Mediterranean between June and October 1800, she returned to Woolwich to be converted to a floating battery at a cost of £1,269. Between January 1802 and June 1803, the ship resided at Deptford, where she was refitted as a storeship once more. From May, she was under Commander Henry Waring, who, following the ship's refit, took her to the Leeward Islands.

In March 1804, Serapis was part of the invasion force that captured the Dutch colony of Surinam. Under the command of Commodore Samuel Hood's, flying his flag in HMS Centaur, the expedition also included Emerald, Pandour, the 28-gun sixth-rate Alligator, the 12-gun schooner Unique, the 12-gun corvette Hippomenes, and the 8-gun Drake, together with 2,000 troops under Brigadier-General Sir Charles Green. Later, the crew of Serapis would receive a share of £32,000 from the spoils.

Despite being only lightly armed, her heavy build and height gave her an advantage over similarly armed vessels, and in October, Serapis recaptured a brig and a fully-rigged ship.

Serapis was under Commander Christopher Sterling from August 1804 until December, when Commander John Lawrence was appointed for service in the North Sea. Returning to England in May 1805.

In 1807, Serapis was in the Mediterranean under Master William Lloyd who then sailed her to the Cape in April 1808. By 1809, she was back in the North Sea, and took part in the Walcheren expedition between 30 July and 16 August that year. She was kept at Woolwich between August 1810 and July 1811 before being sent back to the Mediterranean. Thomas Stokes took over as master in 1813, then Lloyd again in September 1814 while serving on Jamaica station. Forward departed Spithead anchorage on 2 December 1814 and arrived at Port Royal on 11 February 1815, having been part of a larger convoy of around 230 vessels with Swiftsure (1804) as its flagship. (Note: 'A fleet of about 230 sail, under convoy of the Swiftsure of 74 guns, Capt. Adderley... Serapis store-ship, of 44 guns, Mr. Lloyd master [set sail from the Solent on 2 December 1814]... On the 1st inst. the fleet arrived off Barbados... The Forward [escorted] those [vessels destined] for this port [and arrived at Port Royal on 11 February 1815, as recorded on page 17.]')

She sailed to Portsmouth in September 1818 to converted for use as a convalescent ship, before returning to Jamaica in the February following. She was recommissioned in December under Lieutenant G. Jackson then Lieutenant C. Elliot in January 1826, when she was serving as a prison hospital in Bermuda. On 17 July 1826, Serapis was sold for £500 at Jamaica.
