= Wolfert Simon van Hoogenheim =

Dutch States Army officer and colonial administrator

Governor of Berbice
- In office 4 April 1760 – 20 September 1764
- Preceded by: Hendrik Jan van Rijswijck
- Succeeded by: Johannes Heijliger

Personal details
- Born: c. 1730 Dutch Republic
- Died: 2 April 1794 Vleuten, Dutch Republic
- Spouse: Henrietta Wilhelmina Otters
- Occupation: governor, military officer

Wolfert Simon van Hoogenheim (c. 1730 – 2 April 1794) was a Dutch States Army officer and colonial administrator who served as the governor of Berbice from 1760 to 1764. During his tenure as governor, the Berbice Rebellion took place.

== Biography ==
Wolfert Simon van Hoogenheim was born in the East of the Netherlands. At the age of 15, he enlisted in the army to become an officer. By 1760, he had reached the rank of sub-lieutenant. In 1760, the Board of Directors of the Society of Berbice offered Hoogenheim to become governor of the colony which he accepted. On 13 May 1760, he married Henrietta Wilhelmina Otters in Arnhem.

When van Hoogenheim arrived in Berbice, the colony was suffering from an epidemic, and food shortage. Van Hoogenheim requested that emergency rations to be sent to the colony. On 25 December 1760, his wife died after giving birth to a stillborn child.

=== Berbice Rebellion ===
On 23 February 1763, slaves on plantation Magdalenenberg on the Canje River in Berbice rebelled, protesting harsh and inhumane treatment. They torched the plantation house, and made for the Courantyne River where Caribs and troops commanded by Governor Wigbold Crommelin of Suriname attacked, and killed them. On 27 February 1763, a revolt took place on plantation Hollandia on the Berbice River next to Lilienburg where Coffy was an enslaved man working as a cooper. Coffy is said to have organized them into a military unit. From then on, the revolt spread to neighbouring plantations.

There were supposed to be 60 soldiers in Fort Nassau, however at the time of uprising, there were only 18 men including civilian militia in the fort. Van Hoogenheim wanted to make a stand at Fort Nassau, however the Court of Policy overruled the governor, and ordered that Fort Nassau be abandoned and destroyed. The colonists retreated to Fort Sint Andries near the Atlantic coast. The rebels came to number about 3,000 and threatened European control over the Guianas. Van Hoogenheim first requested assistance from the Society of Berbice, however they were only willing to send 50 soldiers., therefore van Hoogenheim also asked the States General for military assistance. In April 1763, Coffy started peace negotiations suggesting to split Berbice into a European and an African part. The Governor replied that Amsterdam should make the decision, and that it could take three to four months, thus buying time for the reinforcements to arrive. On 1 January 1764, six ships arrived, providing the starting signal for expeditions against the rebel slaves. The insurgents were being defeated, and the last rebel was captured on 15 April 1764.

=== Aftermath ===
The uprising lead to a steep population decline, abandonment and destruction of many plantations, and serious financial problems for the Society of Berbice. At the end of 1763, van Hoogenheim started work on a rehabilitation plan which included better forts, 400 soldiers and financial support for the planters. His plans were ignored, and van Hoogenheim requested an honourable discharge which was granted on 20 September 1764, but without a favorable recommendation. He tried to be reimbursed for his possessions which he lost during the rebellion, however the Society only reimbursed half. He retired jobless to Arnhem, and wrote Corte Memorie about the slave revolt. A copy of his memories were sent to Field Marshal von Brunswick-Wolfenbüttel who was in charge of the reconquest of Berbice. Von Brunswick-Wolfenbüttel reinstated van Hoogenheim in the army as a Major on 6 April 1767. He retired in 1787, and died in Vleuten on 2 April 1794.

== Bibliography ==
- Blair, Barbara L. (1984). "Wolfert Simon van Hoogenheim in the Berbice slave revolt of 1763-1764". Journal of the Humanities and Social Sciences of Southeast Asia. 140 (1). Brill Publishers: 56–76. doi:10.1163/22134379-90003427.
- Hartsinck, J.J. (1770). Beschryving van Guiana, of de wilde kust in Zuid-America (in Dutch). Amsterdam: Gerrit Tielenburg.
- Netscher, Pieter Marinus (1888). Geschiedenis van de koloniën Essequebo, Demerary en Berbice, van de vestiging der Nederlanders aldaar tot op onzen tijd (in Dutch). The Hague: Martinus Nijhoff.
