= Baracara =

Baracara New Ground Village or Wel te Vreeden
- Village
- Location in Guyana
- Coordinates: 5.845°N 57.465°W
- Country: Guyana
- Region: East Berbice-Corentyne

Population (2018)
  - Total: c.350
- Time zone: UTC-4
- Climate: Af

Baracara village was founded by people of African descent in the East Berbice-Corentyne Region of Guyana, located on the Canje River. The community has also been called New Ground Village or Wel te Vreeden. Baracara is 20 miles west of Corriverton and just north of the Torani Canal's connection to the Canje River.

== Overview ==
Baracara is the only Maroon village in Guyana. A group of escaped slaves settled in Baracara in the early 19th century, and occupied both the east and west banks of the river. The demographics are mostly Afro-Guyanese.

The economy of the village is based on subsistence farming and logging. The village has a health centre, and a primary school, but no secondary school. Baracara can only be accessed by boat from the river. As of 2015, the village has no local government. In 2018, the village received access to the telephone network and Internet.

The village has Scottish Presbyterian, Adventist and Pentecostal churches.

== Maroonage in Guyana ==
Unlike neighbouring Suriname where tribes like the Ndyuka and Saramaka established autonomous territories, escaped slaves in Guyana were hunted by the local Amerindian tribes for reward. The incentive was very successful: on 5 May 1764, after the Berbice slave uprising, the post holder at Courantyne, near present-day Orealla, reported that he had paid out ƒ 1,074 for captured slaves, and ƒ 1,080 for 180 cut-off hands of killed slaves.

In 1740, Thomas Hildebrand was given permission to look for silver in the Blue Mountains using slaves. The hard work and rough treatment resulted in six deaths among the slaves. The next year, a group of mining slaves escaped to Creole Island on the Cuyuni River. The location was too difficult to conquer, therefore a deal was negotiated and concluded on 8 February 1742. The slaves would be freed, and never had to work in the mines, if they promised to perform a fixed amount of work on the plantations. Three slaves who did not accept the offer were hunted and killed by the local Amerindians.

== Notable residents ==
- Shamar Joseph - West Indian cricketer
- Romario Shepherd - West Indian cricketer

== Bibliography ==
- Netscher, Pieter Marinus (1888). Geschiedenis van de koloniën Essequebo, Demerary en Berbice, van de vestiging der Nederlanders aldaar tot op onzen tijd (in Dutch). The Hague: Martinus Nijhoff.
