= Afro-Guyanese =

Guyanese people of African descent

Total population
- 29.3% of Guyana's population (2012)

Regions with significant populations
- Guyana (Georgetown, Linden, Essequibo Coast and New Amsterdam); United Kingdom, Canada, United States

Languages
- Guyanese Creole, extinct: Berbice Dutch Creole, Skepi Dutch Creole

Religion
- Majority: Christianity (92-95%); Minority: Islam (3-5%), Rastafari (2-3%), Comfa, Afro-American religions, Traditional African religions

Related ethnic groups
- Afro-Surinamese, Afro-Barbadians, other Afro-Caribbeans, Atlantic Creole

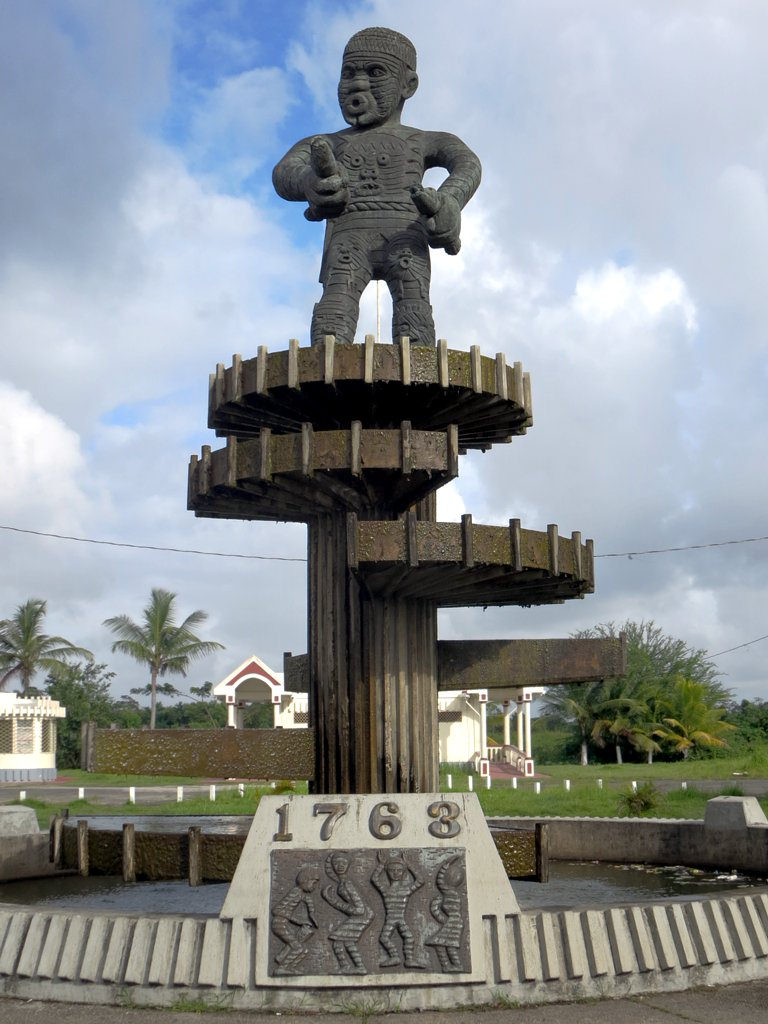
Slave revolt leader, Cuffy

Afro-Guyanese, also known as Black Guyanese, is a Creole ethnic group that primarily lives in the South American country of Guyana. Generally, they descend from enslaved Africans taken to Guyana from West and Central Africa, and the Lesser Antilles during the Atlantic slave trade. Following the abolition of slavery, thousands of Bajans and other Afro-Caribbeans immigrated to Guyana from 1835 to 1928, many of whom assimilated into the pre-existing creole population. Although Guyana is geographically located in South-America, Afro-Guyanese are considered Afro-Caribbean due to their cultural and ancestral roots in the Caribbean islands.

== History ==
=== Slavery ===
In the year 1498, Italian explorer Christopher Columbus visited the coastline of what is now known as Guyana. Prior to the advent of slavery, the territory that constitutes modern-day Guyana was occupied by Indigenous Amerindian groups, such as the Lokono, Kalina, and Warao tribes. European interaction commenced in 1499; however, it was not until the 17th century that substantial colonization efforts by the Dutch, French, and British truly took root, motivated by the quest for wealth derived from plantation agriculture, especially sugar. This transition ultimately resulted in the large-scale importation of enslaved Africans to labor on the plantations, significantly altering the region's demographic and economic framework.

Sometime in the 1620s, the Dutch West India Company (WIC) began operating in the Guiana region in South America. And in 1627, they established the Colony of Berbice with the aim of supplying it with "as many blacks as possible". As a result, enslaved Africans became a key element in the colonial economy. By the 1660s, the slave population numbered about 2,500. Initially, most Africans in the Guianas were taken against their will from the Slave Coast and the Loango–Angola region. From 1675 to 1737, half of them were from the Gold Coast.

Many Guyanese slaves initially worked on Caribbean plantations in the Lesser Antilles. In 1745, the Dutch established the colony of Demerara and invited British planters from nearby colonies to start plantations. Many planters from the Lesser Antilles (and a small amount from Carolina) settled in Demerara and Essequibo, bringing enslaved Africans with them. Most of the enslaved from the Caribbean came from Barbados, Saint Kitts, and Antigua.

White supremacist planters owned Africans as private property and systematically robbed them of any human rights or freedom. Black people were considered racially and culturally inferior which led many enslaved to develop internalized shame and stigma toward their ancestral traditions. Even though Black people were considered an essential element of the colonial economy, their working conditions were brutal. It's estimated African slaves moved 100 million tons of clay to create the irrigation system for the plantations. They produced coffee, cut sugarcane, and picked cotton for the Dutch market. The mortality rate was high, and the dismal conditions led to more than half a dozen slave rebellions.

The Berbice Slave Uprising began on 23 February 1763. On two plantations on the Canje River in Berbice, slaves rebelled, taking control of the region. As plantation after plantation fell to the slaves, the European population fled; eventually only half of the whites who had lived in the colony remained. Led by Cuffy (now the national hero of Guyana), the African freedom fighters came to number about 3,000 and threatened European control over the Guianas. The freedom fighters were defeated with the assistance of troops from neighbouring French and British colonies and from Europe.

Control of the Guyanese colonies alternated between the Dutch, French, and British Empires. The British Empire abolished the international slave trade in 1807. And in 1814, Essequibo, Demerara, and Berbice were officially ceded to them from the Netherlands. Colonial life was changed radically by the demise of slavery. In what is known as the Demerara rebellion of 1823 10–13,000 slaves in Demerara-Essequibo rose up against their masters, although the rebellion was easily crushed.

In 1833, the Slavery Abolition Act 1833 was passed. Slavery itself continued in the form of "apprentice-ship" which was established to create a buffer period for plantation owners; to keep former slaves as labour but providing payment. In 1838, total emancipation had been effected.

=== Emancipation ===
Even though there was still a demand for plantation labour, the labour conditions were no better post-emancipation, so former slaves were less inclined to work in the plantation system, favouring self-reliance or skilled work. Some ex-slaves moved to towns and villages, feeling that field labour was degrading and inconsistent with freedom, but others pooled their resources to purchase the abandoned estates of their former masters and created village communities. Establishing small settlements provided the new Afro-Guyanese communities an opportunity to grow and sell food, an extension of a practice under which slaves had been allowed to keep the money that came from the sale of any surplus produce. The emergence of an independent-minded Afro-Guyanese peasant class, however, threatened the planters' political power, inasmuch as the planters no longer held a near-monopoly on the colony's economic activity.

In 1841, Creoles held the first ever workers strike in British Guiana. Later, Creole men started forming mobile task gangs and would visit plantations to examine working conditions before committing to agreements with employers. If demands weren't met, creoles would go on strike around harvest time. To weaken the bargaining power of Black workers, the white ruling class used their political power to import new bound-labor to the colony. Most of the new labor came from the Indian subcontinent.

Unlike future immigrant groups, former slaves were not granted land or passage to their home country, and this, in addition to racial prejudice, created tension among the ethnic groups.

=== Ethnic origins ===
The Afro-Guyanese are largely descended from the Akans of Ghana West Africa, with lesser ancestries attributed to the Igbo, Yoruba, and Kongolese. There is plenty of cultural evidence to support this. Cuffy (Kofi Badu), the rebel leader was an Akan man born in Ghana, West Africa. So was Quamina Gladstone. Majority of the Afro-Guyanese dishes eaten in Guyana originated in Ghana including but not limited to: fufu, metemgee and cookup rice (waakye). There is also the sorrel drink (hibiscus) known as zobo/sobolo in Ghana. Majority of the Afro-Guyanese cultures in Guyana can be traced back to Ghana with little other African claims.

However, due to the diverse society they reside in, Afro-Guyanese are more likely to simply identify as Black or sometimes, but rarely, Creole.

=== 20th century ===
By the early twentieth century, the majority of the urban population of the country was Afro-Guyanese. Many Afro-Guyanese people living in villages had migrated to the towns in search of work. Until the 1930s, Creoles—especially those of mixed descent—comprised the bulk of the non-white professional class. During the 1930s, as Indo-Guyanese began to enter the middle class in large numbers, they began to compete with Afro-Guyanese for professional positions.

== Culture ==
Many of the elements in Afro-Guyanese culture can be traced back to the Koromantees, Akan rebels from what is now Ghana through foods, historical evidence and culture. Many of these elements were brought over under Dutch rule, which explains why Guyana and Suriname share extremely similar cultures compared to other parts of the Caribbean as both countries were originally under Dutch rule. The Akans were primarily brought over during Dutch rule which explains the Koromantee element of Afro-Guyanese culture while Nigerian (Igbo/Yoruba) and Kongolese was primarily but not limited to, brought over through migration from neighboring Caribbean countries such as Barbados & Trinidad & Tobago. This explains how non-Koromantee elements of African origins entered the Afro-Guyanese culture. (For example, the food bakes (akara) and saltfish are a part of the Afro-Guyanese culture despite being of Afro-Barbadian (Yoruba) origins, connecting them with Afro-Caribbean culture.)

=== Creole identity ===
In Guyana, the term ‘creole’ refers to enslaved Africans born in the former colony, and their descendants.

Black people born in the colonies (of what eventually became British Guiana) were dubbed ‘Creole’ by Europeans to distinguish them from African born slaves. Creole slaves often had mixed African ancestry and didn't identify with any particular African ethnicity, and as generations advanced, Black lineage's became increasingly multi-ethnic.

As slaves blended different African traditions while acquiring customs from their European oppressors, a distinct creole culture was formed. Mixed-race Guyanese of African descent are also considered Creole.

While the term is a historic identity, it is not used by all Afro-Guyanese in day to day conversation. However, it is still referenced in certain contexts.

=== Creole languages ===
Afro-Guyanese developed several Creole languages such as:

Guyanese Creole – Also, called 'Awe an Ayu'. The lingua-Franca of Guyana. It developed during slavery and has similarities with Bajan Creole and Saint Kitts Creole, and Antiguan and Barbudan Creole.

Berbice Creole Dutch – Now extinct older Creole that is considered the most African creole language in the Americas. 38% of its vocabulary is derived from African languages and the other 60% from Dutch and English.

Skepi Creole Dutch – Now extinct Dutch based Creole language that was spoken in Essequibo. Most of the lexicon has been lost.

Congo creole

=== Creole cuisine ===
Many Afro-Guyanese dishes originated in Ghana. Some examples are:

Fufu

Metemgee (Twi: metem = plantains or bananas; gye = to delight (delighted bananas))

Cou-cou (Twi: nkuku)

Cookup Rice (Waakye in Ghana)

Sorrel may be influenced by Zobo/Sobolo.

Music

Shanto

=== Marriage ===
A popular element of Afro-Guyanese culture is the Kwe-Kwe. The Kwe-Kwe is a pre-wedding dance of West African origin that is done before the wedding and is unique to the Afro-Guyanese. It is a dance with heavy West African influence and uniting of the 2 families with friends as well.

== Religion and folklore ==
Although the greatest numbers of Afro-Guyanese are Christian. There are also believers in obeah.

Obeah is a catch-all term for any African magic, medicine, sorcery, and all other Creole folk practices the colonial power could not comprehend. Although, the term also extends to later South Indian spiritual traditions.

From 1855 to 1970, the colonial government outlawed African spiritual practices. During this period Obeah practitioners went into secrecy. Creoles practitioners would ritually mix their blood with grave dirt to administer an oath of secrecy or purgation.

=== Cosmology ===
Some traditionalists claim the Universe is full of many spirits and every person has two spirits: A good spirit, and an evil spirit. Ancestral spirits are close at hand to give guidance and protection when called upon.

There are several spiritual entities within creole folklore that have roots in Africa.

==== Ole Higue ====
Ole Higue is a spirit who moves through the night as a ball of fire. She thrives off sucking the blood from babies and animals. During the day, she looks like a regular old woman. But before going out at night, she removes her skin and hides it. Wearing the color blue wards off her attacks. She is said to have an obsession with counting small things. Therefore if sand or rice is thrown outside one’s door, she will waste her night counting it. If she doesn’t return to her skin before sunrise, she will turn to ash.

==== The Bacoo ====
Bacoo spirits are little Black men with fiery red eyes. Usually, Bacoos cannot be seen. They are said to generate immense wealth for their owners. However, if they are not fed with bananas, milk, or honey, they will create mischief. If lights are turned on and off, furniture is wrecked, houses stoned, then one knows they are around. To obtain a Bacoo, one must travel to Suriname to acquire them. Large businesses are said to have a Bacoo working for them.

== Social experience ==
Slavery had a devastating impact on family and social structure, as individual family members were bought and sold with little regard to kinship or relation. Marriage was not legally recognized for slaves, and even after emancipation, weddings and legal marriages were cost-prohibitive. Household compositions vary, and can be matriarchal or a nuclear family unit.

Afro-Guyanese make up a significant portion of the public sector workforce. Afro-Guyanese face challenges to private sector involvement, such as access to financing. In politics, Afro-Guyanese make up a large portion of A Partnership for National Unity party voters.

In 2017, a United Nations expert group determined that Afro-Guyanese face discrimination in law enforcement, employment, and education, despite that Afro-Guyanese make up 90% of the workforce in these named areas.

== Notable Afro-Guyanese ==
John R. Rickford

Walter Rodney

Eusi Kwayana

Grace Nichols

E. R. Braithwaite

Wilson Harris

Letitia Wright

Jan Carew

Hubert Nathaniel Critchlow

Eddy Grant

Notable people With Afro-Guyanese heritage

Shirley Chisholm(Bajan mother, Afro-Guyanese father)

Rihanna(Bajan, having a Afro-Guyanese mother)

Olivia Dean(English father, Jamaican-Guyanese mother)

Melanie Fiona

== See also ==
- Afro-Caribbean people
- Guyanese people
- Guyanese in the United Kingdom

== Works cited ==
- MacDonald, Scott B. (1993). "Guyana". In Merrill, Tim (ed.). Guyana and Belize: country studies (2nd ed.). Washington, D.C.: Federal Research Division, Library of Congress. ISBN 0-8444-0778-X. OCLC 28066032.
