= Fort Nassau (Guyana) =

Fortified capital of the Dutch colony of Berbice

- Fort Nassau
- Part of Berbice
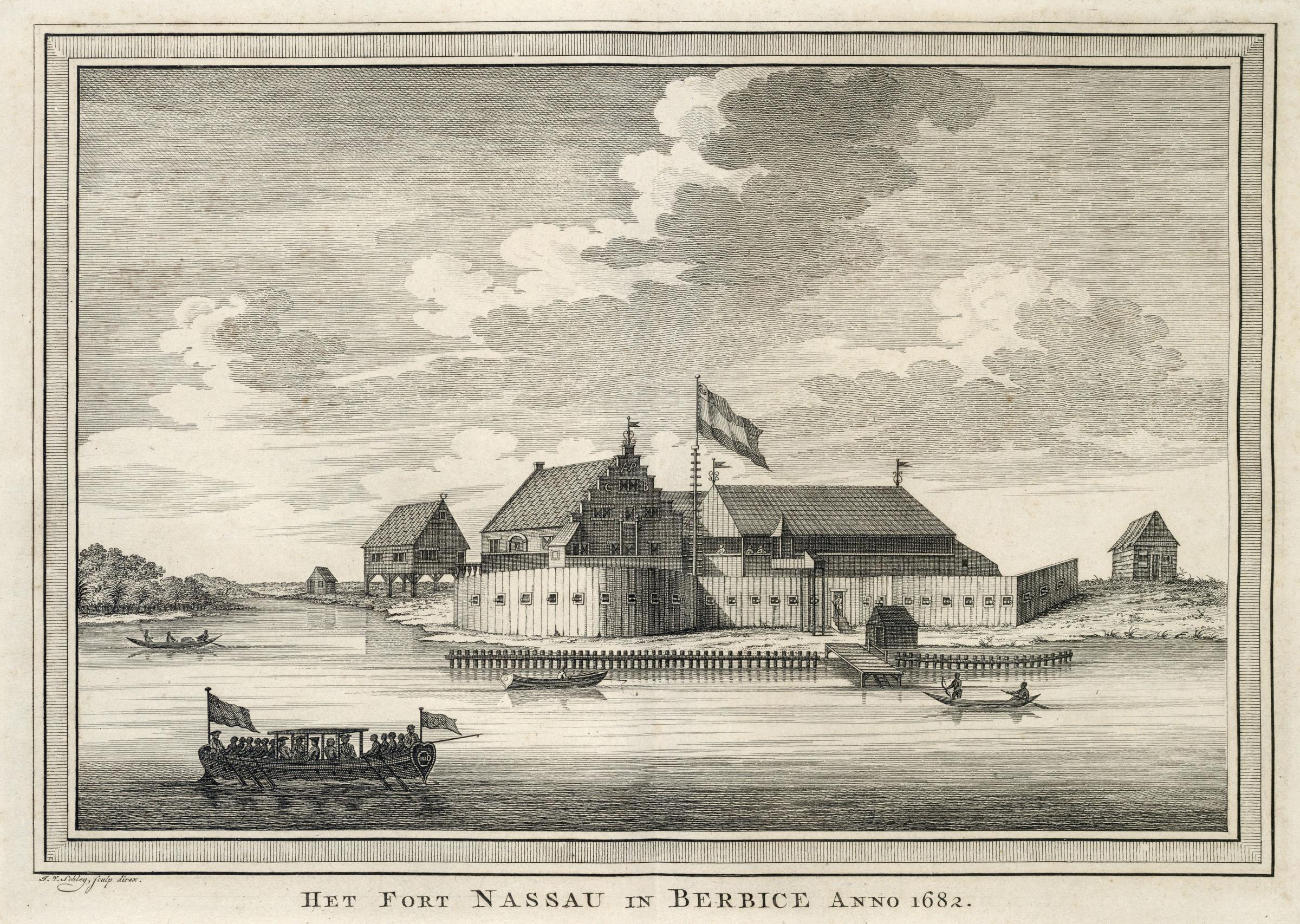
- Fort Nassau

Location
- Coordinates: 5.752515°N 57.661728°W

Site history
- Built: 1627

Garrison information
- Occupants: Netherlands (1627–1815)

Fort Nassau was the fortified capital of the Dutch colony of Berbice, in present-day Guyana. It was situated on the Berbice River approximately 88 kilometres upstream from New Amsterdam.

== Founding ==
About 1627 Abraham van Peere, a Dutch settler in Guyana, sought permission from the Zeeland Chamber of the Dutch West India Company (WIC) to settle in Berbice. His intention was to exploit the resources of Berbice by trading with the indigenous Amerindians. Van Peere intended to do this mainly by planting export crops, such as sugar, tobacco, cotton and annatto, as well as by exporting minerals. In return for the permission that was granted to Van Peere, he was asked to give the WIC one-fifth of his income from the sale of gold, silver and other precious stones.

Van Peere built a fort about 80 kilometres (50 mi) up the Berbice River which he named Nassau, after Maurice of Nassau, Prince of Orange, who subsequently became the conqueror of a large part of Brazil. This settlement was started by Van Peere with about 40 men and 20 boys.

== Development ==
The settlement around Fort Nassau became a successful trading post. The Dutch bartered goods such as knives, hardware and cloth for tobacco and annatto. Slaves from Africa were few and the Dutch were dependent on the goodwill of the indigenous inhabitants who sold them Amerindian slaves captured and taken from other tribes. The settlers who were involved in this Amerindian slave trade dissipated their energies and affected the settlement adversely. There was little progress.

The original fort was burnt by the French when they attacked Berbice in 1712, but it was rebuilt by the Dutch. In 1733, a village which had sprung up around Fort Nassau was named New Amsterdam (Dutch: Nieuw Amsterdam). The fort was later destroyed by order of Governor Wolfert Simon van Hoogenheim in 1763 to prevent its capture by the slaves during the Berbice Slave Uprising.

== Abandonment and preservation ==
The fort and the village were abandoned in 1785 in favour of Fort Sint Andries, situated further downstream, at the confluence of the Berbice with the Canje River. This new settlement eventually became the town of New Amsterdam, and is still known by that name in contemporary Guyana.

The remains of Fort Nassau were declared a National Monument by the Guyanese government in 1999. Recently, efforts have been started to preserve the fort.
