= Cuffy =

Guyanese slave uprising leader

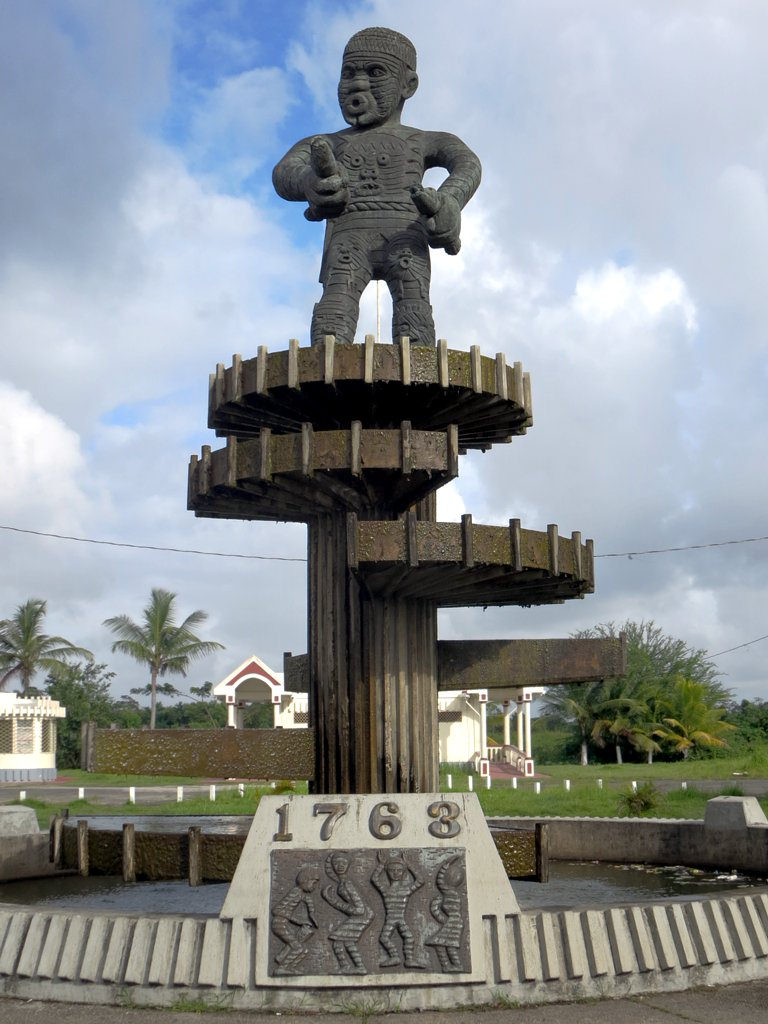
- Monument of Cuffy designed by Philip Moore (1976)
- Born: 18th century Dutch Gold Coast (present-day Ghana)
- Died: 1763; Berbice (present-day Guyana)
- Other name: Kofi Badu
- Occupation: Enslaved man
- Known for: Leading a major slave revolt

Cuffy (Note: Also spelt as Coffij, Coffy, Kofi, Kofi Badu, or Koffi.) (died 1763) was an African Akan man, who was enslaved in the Dutch colony of Berbice in present-day Guyana. In 1763, he led a major slave revolt of around 5,000 slaves against the Dutch colonists. The slave revolt was eventually suppressed and Cuffy committed suicide. Today, he is a national hero in Guyana.

== Early life ==
Cuffy was an Akan man born in the 18th century in the Dutch Gold Coast ('Dutch Guinea'), in what is now southern Ghana. At some point he was captured into slavery, and sent across the ocean as part of the Atlantic slave trade. He was sent to the Dutch colony of Berbice (now Guyana), where he and many other African slaves were made to work on Dutch plantations.

== Berbice Rebellion ==
Cuffy lived in Lilienburg, a plantation on the Berbice River, as a house-slave for a cooper (barrel maker). He was owned by the widow Berkey. On 23 February 1763, slaves on plantation Magdalenenberg on the Canje River rebelled, protesting harsh and inhumane treatment. They torched the plantation house, and made for the Courantyne River where Caribs and troops commanded by Governor Wigbold Crommelin of Suriname attacked, and killed them. On 27 February 1763, a revolt took place on the Hollandia plantation next to Lilienburg. Cuffy is said to have organized the slaves into a military unit, after which the revolt spread to neighbouring plantations. When Dutch Governor Wolfert Simon van Hoogenheim sent military assistance to the region, the rebellion had reached the Berbice River and was moving steadily towards the Berbice capital, Fort Nassau. The rebels seized gunpowder and guns from the attacked plantations.

By 3 March, the rebels were 600 in number. Led by Cossala, they tried to take the brick house of Peerenboom. They agreed to allow the Dutch to leave the brick house, but as soon they left, the rebels killed many and took several prisoners, among them Sara George, the 19-year-old daughter of the Peerenboom plantation owner, whom Cuffy kept as his wife.

Cuffy was soon accepted by the rebels as their leader and declared himself Governor of Berbice. Doing so he named Captain Accara (Note: Also spelt as Akara, or Akra. And with the Old-Dutch version Capitein.) as his deputy in charge of military affairs, and tried to establish discipline over the troops. Accara was skilful in military discipline. They organized the farms in order to provide food supplies.

== Defeat of the rebellion ==
Wolfert Simon van Hoogenheim committed himself to retake the colony. Accara attacked the Dutch three times without permission from Cuffy, and eventually the colonists were driven back. Thus began a dispute among the two rebels. On 2 April 1763, Cuffy wrote to Van Hoogenheim saying that he did not want a war against the Dutch and proposed a partition of Berbice with the Dutch occupying the coastal areas and the blacks the interior. Van Hoogenheim delayed his decision replying that the Society of Berbice in Amsterdam had to make that decision and that it would take three to four months. He was waiting for support from neighbouring colonies; a ship from Suriname had already arrived, and reinforcements from Barbados and Sint Eustatius soon followed. Cuffy then ordered his forces to attack the Dutch in May 1763, but in so doing had many losses. The defeat opened a division among the rebels and weakened their organisation. Accara became the leader of a new faction opposed to Cuffy and led to a civil war among themselves. On 19 October 1763, it was reported to the governor that Captains Atta had revolted against Cuffy, and that Cuffy had committed suicide. In the meantime, the colonists had already been strengthened by the arrival of soldiers. On 15 April 1764 Captain Accabre, the last of the insurgents, was captured.

== National hero ==
The anniversary of the Berbice Rebellion, 23 February, has been Republic Day in Guyana since 1970. Cuffy is commemorated in the 1763 Monument in the Square of the Revolution in the capital Georgetown.

This statue is called the 1763 Monument or the Cuffy Monument. The statue was designed by the Guyanese sculptor Philip Moore. It stands at 15 feet tall and weighs two and a half tons.

The figure of Cuffy standing on top has many symbols. His pouting mouth symbolises his defiance, the face on his chest forms a symbolic breastplate that gives protection during battle, and the honed faces on his thighs represent revolutionaries from Guyanese history. He holds in his hands a dog and a pig, both being throttled with the dog representing covetousness and greed while the pig represents ignorance.

== See also ==
- List of slaves
- Emancipation Statue (Haggett Hall, Barbados)
- Emancipation Park (Kingston, Jamaica)

== Bibliography ==
- Hartsinck, J.J. (1770), Beschryving van Guiana, of de wilde kust in Zuid-America, Amsterdam: Gerrit Tielenburg
- Netscher, Pieter Marinus (1888). Geschiedenis van de koloniën Essequebo, Demerary en Berbice, van de vestiging der Nederlanders aldaar tot op onzen tijd (in Dutch). The Hague: Martinus Nijhoff.
