= Berbice Rebellion =

1763 slave rebellion in Guyana

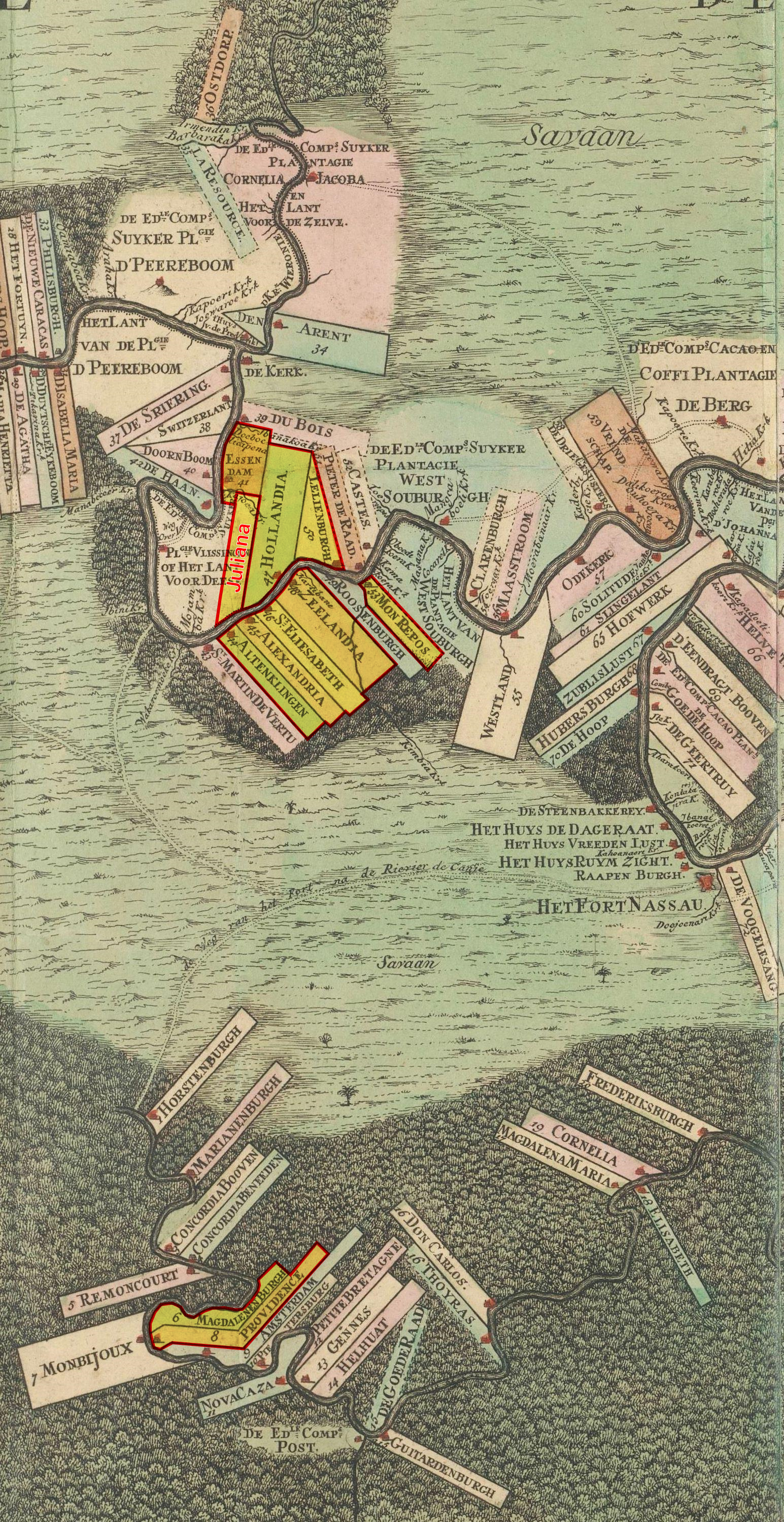
- The revolting plantations (highlighted)
Date	23 February 1763 – 15 April 1764 (1 year, 1 month)
Location	Berbice, Dutch Guiana
Result	Dutch victory

Belligerents
Dutch Republic; Barbados; Arawak; Kalina	Rebels

Commanders and leaders
Wolfert van Hoogenheim; Louis-Henri Fourgeoud; Duke Louis Ernest of Brunswick-Lüneburg	Governor Cuffy; Captain Atta; Captain Accara; Captain Accabre

Casualties and losses
±50	±1800

The Berbice Rebellion was a slave rebellion in Berbice, Dutch Guiana (present-day Guyana), that began on 27 February 1763 and lasted to April 1764, with among them the famous rebel leader Cuffy. (Note: Also spelt as Coffij, Coffy, Kofi, Kofi Badu, or Koffi.) This was the first major slave revolt in South America, and it is seen as a major event in Guyana's anti-colonial struggles. When Guyana became an independent republic in 1970 the state declared the anniversary of Cuffy's slave rebellion on 23 February as the Republic Day, a day to commemorate the start of the Berbice slave revolt. Cuffy is a national hero commemorated in a large monument in the capital, Georgetown.

The slave rebellion was led by a Coromantin man named Cuffy and his deputy Captain Accara. (Note: Also spelt as Akara, or Akra. And with the Old-Dutch version Capitein.) Cuffy was born in the Dutch Gold Coast in West Africa (now south Ghana) before being trafficked and enslaved. He led the revolt of more than 2,500 against the colony's regime. After acquiring firearms, the rebels attacked plantations. They gained an advantage after taking the plantation De Peereboom. They told the European settlers that they could leave the colony, however the rebels killed many when they did and took several prisoners, including the wife of a plantation owner, whom Cuffy kept as his wife.

After several months, a dispute between Cuffy and Accara led to a conflict in which Accara turned against Cuffy. On 2 April 1763, Cuffy wrote to Governor van Hoogenheim, stating that he did not want a war against the colony's rulers of the Dutch West India Company (WIC) in the Dutch Republic, and proposed a partition of Berbice with the WIC occupying the coastal areas and the free slaves the interior. Accara's faction attacked Cuffy and won, resulting in Cuffy taking his own life.

== Background ==
The colony of Berbice was originally a hereditary fief of the Van Peere family granted by the Dutch West India Company (WIC). After refusing to pay the ransom demanded by the French privateer Jacques Cassard, the colony changed hands to four Amsterdam merchants, who founded the Society of Berbice in 1720 as a public company listed on the Amsterdam Stock Exchange. The colony was not very successful compared to other colonies, because it only paid 4% dividend to the stockholders.

In 1762, the population of the Dutch colony of Berbice included 3,833 enslaved of African descent, 244 enslaved Amerindians (indigenous people), and 346 European colonists. The Seven Years' War caused a reduction in supplies to the colony, resulting in hunger among the slave population. In late 1762, a disease had broken out in the fort, and many soldiers had died or fallen ill. On 3 July 1762, Laurens Kunckler, the owner of plantation Goed Fortuin, left for Fort Nassau. The slaves used this opportunity to raid the plantation, and hide on an island high upriver. Indigenous soldiers (especially Kalina and Lokono) were crucial to the Dutch effort to retake Berbice, as their scouting and harassing of rebel troops in the interior prevented the formation of Maroon communities similar to those in Suriname. The soldiers, despite aid by indigenous allies, were unable to recapture the island until the rebels were forced to leave on 8 or 9 August, likely due to lack of food.

== Rebellion ==
On 23 February 1763, slaves on plantation Magdalenenberg on the Canje River in Berbice rebelled, protesting harsh and inhumane treatment. They torched the plantation house, and made for the Courantyne River where Caribs and troops commanded by Governor Wigbold Crommelin of Suriname attacked, and killed them. On 27 February 1763, a revolt took place on plantation Hollandia on the Berbice River next to Lilienburg, where Cuffy was an enslaved man working as a cooper. He is said to have organised them into a military unit. From then on, the revolt spread to neighbouring plantations.

There were supposed to be 60 soldiers in Fort Nassau; however, at the time of uprising, there were only 18 men including civilian militia in the fort. As plantation after plantation fell to the slaves, the Dutch settlers fled northward to the coast, and the rebels began to take over control of the region. For almost a year, the rebels held on to southern Berbice, while the Dutch were able to hold on to the north. Eventually only about half of the European population that had lived in the colony remained.

The rebels came to number about 3,000 and threatened European control over the Guianas. Cuffy was installed as the political leader, and Accara was the military leader. Cuffy tried to keep the captured plantations operating to prevent starvation. Governor van Hoogenheim asked the States General for military assistance. On 28 March 1763, the ship Betsy arrived from Suriname with 100 soldiers. The former slaves were driven back, and a camp was set up at De Dageraad ('The Daybreak'). On 2 April, 300 to 400 rebels attacked, led by Accara, which took control over the region.

== Suppression ==
Cuffy contacted van Hoogenheim and said that he regretted the attack, and started peace negotiations suggesting to split Berbice into a European and an African part. The Governor replied that Amsterdam should make the decision, and that it could take three to four months. Two days after receiving news of the rebellion, the Barbados merchant Gedney Clarke Sr. gathered a force of 50 Barbadian militiamen and 100 British marines and Royal Navy sailors which he sent to Demerara in five merchantmen. The marines and sailors were from the crew of HMS Pembroke and had been lent to Clarke by Vice-Admiral of the Blue George Rodney. Clarke owned seven plantations in Dutch Guiana and his force, which comprised 300 men after being supplemented by civilian British sailors and "other personnel", went to Demerara without Crown authorisation to protect Clarke's interests.

Clarke's force soon arrived in Demerara, but as Rodney was recalled to England not long after he ordered the marines and sailors to return to Pembroke; the Barbadian militiamen stayed and captured a rebel stronghold at the La Savonnette plantation. The arrival of Clarke's force at Demerara discouraged slaves from joining the rebellion and reassured local colonists. In May, Sint Eustatius provided military assistance. In the meantime, word had reached Amsterdam. On 21 May 1763, the Amsterdamsche Courant reported the revolt of the slaves. The merchants demanded action, and six ships with a total of 600 men set sail to Berbice. Field Marshal Duke Louis Ernest of Brunswick-Lüneburg was assigned to devise a plan to reconquer the colony. On 19 October 1763, it was reported to the governor that Captain Atta had revolted against Cuffy, and that Cuffy had committed suicide. This cancelled the peace negotiations; however, the colonists had already been strengthened by the arrival of soldiers.

On 1 January 1764, the six ships arrived, providing the starting signal for expeditions against the rebel slaves. The insurgents were being defeated. Captain Atta and Accara were captured, at which time Accara changed sides, and helped the Dutch to capture Captain Accabre, the last of the insurgents, on 15 April 1764. The Dutch executed many rebels for participating in the rebellion —the estimates vary from 75 to 128 (125 men and 3 women)— leading to the colony’s recapture by the summer of 1764 and savage repercussions. Around 1,800 rebels died, with 24 burned alive. Captain Accara was pardoned, and later served as a freedman with the marines under his former adversary Louis-Henri Fourgeoud. The population of the colony had decreased to 3,370 slaves (1,308 males, 1,317 females, 745 children) and 115 European settlers in November 1764, which included recently purchased slaves.

== Aftermath ==
Very little changed after the Berbice slave uprising. The Society of Berbice did complain about the number of executions after the uprising, however, they were worried about their reputation and the loss of valuable slaves. The Dutch newspapers devoted a lot of coverage to the uprising, they quickly lost interest after the revolt was put down. The last publication was on the subject was on 19 September 1764 by the Leeuwarder Courant, which published a sensationalist eyewitness account of the executions.

During the fighting, Fort Nassau had been abandoned and set on fire to prevent it falling into enemy hands. In 1785, it was decided to move the government to Fort Sint Andries, which was renamed as New Amsterdam in 1791. The Society of Berbice was in serious financial problems after the revolt, and asked the state government of the States of Holland and West Friesland for a loan. In 1773, the Society of Berbice had repaid ƒ134,815 of the ƒ786,354, and asked for a deferral of payment, which was granted. There are no records that the remaining amount or interest have ever been paid. In February 1765, Gedney Clarke's son send an invoice of ƒ41,060 for his assistance, which was never paid.

=== Similar events ===
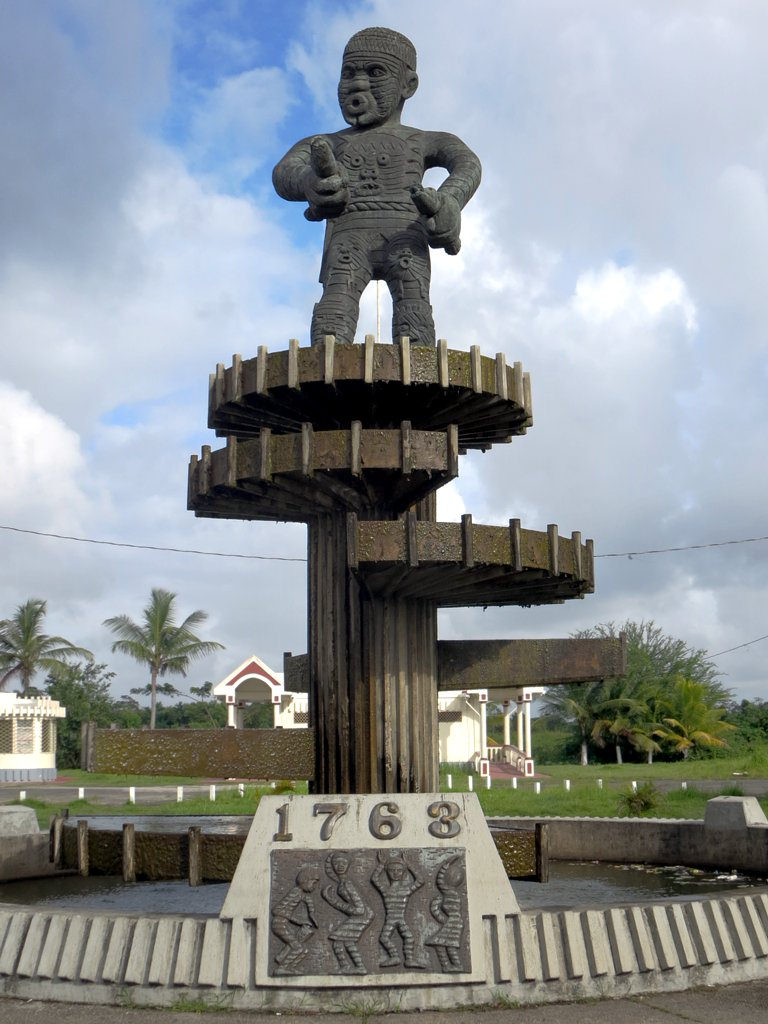
the cuffy monument

A couple of years later in Suriname, escaped slaves led by Boni attacked plantations. Boni tried to get a peace treaty, similar to what the Ndyuka and Saramaka received in 1760 and 1762 respectively, but a war was declared instead. The reason why the Society of Suriname changed their position is unknown; however, people such as Lichtveld pointed to the Berbice slave uprising. In the mid-1770s military officers who had handled the Berbice uprising were dispatched to Suriname.

== Legacy ==
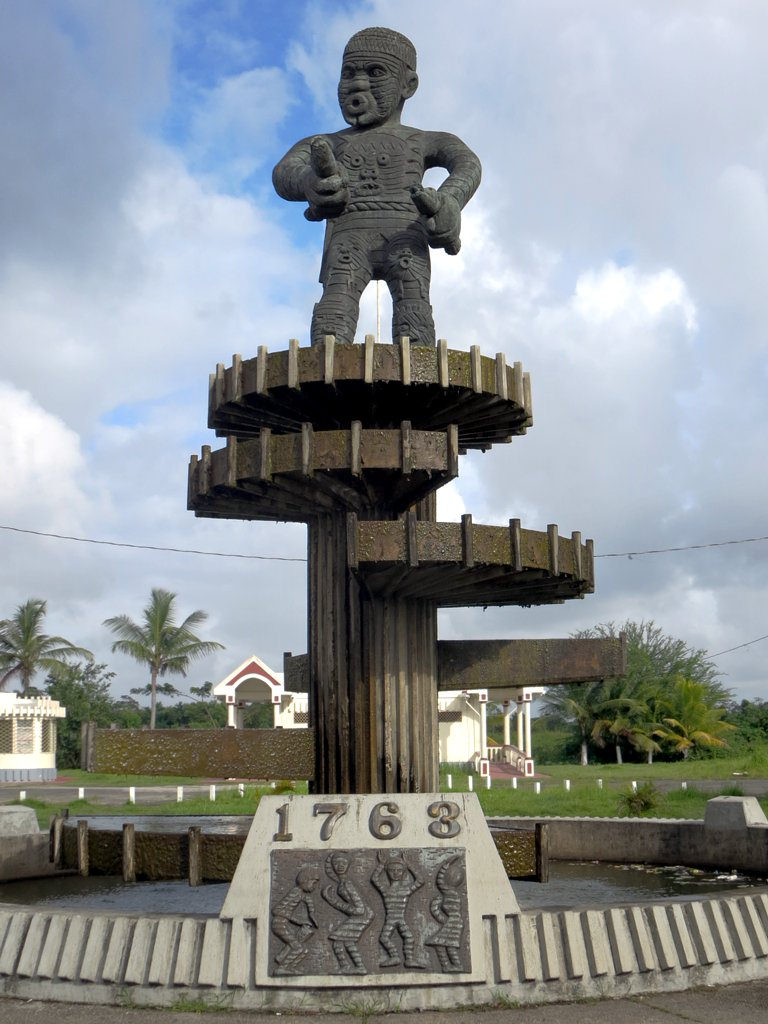
1763 Monument on Square of the Revolution in Georgetown, Guyana, designed by Guyanese artist Philip Moore

Cuffy is commemorated on 23 February as the national hero of Guyana. In 1976, a bronze monument designed by local artist Philip Moore was erected in the Square of the Revolutions, in the capital Georgetown. The monument has been designated as a National Monument.

== See also ==
- Cheddi Jagan Bio Diversity Park
- Demerara rebellion of 1823
- Boni Wars
- History of Guyana
- Slave rebellion
