= Jan van Ryen =

Dutch explorer

- Born: Netherlands
- Piratical career
- Type: Corsair
- Allegiance: Netherlands
- Years active: 1620s
- Rank: Captain
- Base of operations: Caribbean
- Battles: Eighty Years' War
- Later work: Explorer

Jan van Ryen (fl. 1620s–1630s) was a 17th-century Dutch privateer, explorer, and colonist. He was granted a commission by the Dutch West Indies Company and active against the Spanish in the West Indies during the 1620s. He and Claude Prevost attempted to establish Dutch colonies in Guyana, although they both failed with most Dutch colonists being killed by natives in 1627. However, Zeelandian merchant Abraham van Peere was able to found a successful colony in the area shortly after.

== Biography ==
In November 1626, he and Claude Prevost appeared before the Chamber of Zeeland with a proposal to establish a colony in Guyana and requesting the WIC to provide ships and 30 or 40 men. The WIC agreed and, at separate meetings from November 23–26 and December 10–24, the members discussed where to send them. While it was suggested Prevost to be sent to either the Amazon, Oyapock or Essequibo, it was decided that van Ryen alone would colonize Oyapok.

On 22 January 1627 Jan van Ryen left Flushing with three ships and 184 men (including 36 colonists). The small fleet was commanded by Admiral Hendrick Jacobszoon Lucifer and included Galeyn van Stabels in the Vliegende Draeck and Jan Pieterse in the Leeuwin (all three had visited the area previously, Lucifer and van Stapels having carried Captain Oudaen's expedition to Corupa in 1625). After two months, van Ryen and his expedition arrived at their destination on 10 March. Shortly after landing, they encountered three Europeans living in the area. One of the men, Jan Hendricksz, had reportedly lived in the jungles for so long a time that he found it nearly impossible to speak the Dutch language. These men claimed to be the surviving members of a Dutch colony previously established in the Amazon by a Captain Oudaen some time before. According to Hendricksz, the colony was one of several attacked by the Spanish (or possibly the Portuguese). The Dutch fought against their attackers for half a day and forced to flee after 7 or 8 men had been killed fleeing in their longboats to a nearby English settlement where they took refuge. However, the Spanish followed them and both the Dutch and English were forced to fight. All the English were killed as well as many of the Dutch, including Oudaen. Lieutenant Pieter Bruyne took command and left for the Oyapok River with 46 of the survivors, however he was killed by his sergeant in a mutiny soon after. Quarreling amongst themselves, the men split into several groups and eventually settled among the local native tribes.

There are differing accounts of what happened to Jan van Ryen's colony. One account claims Jan van Ryen left the colony for the West Indies soon after their arrival and, in his absence, the Dutch colonists began fighting with the local Kalina (Caribs). They were eventually forced to abandon the colony when the situation became too dangerous for them to stay, some going to St. Vincents and Tobago. According to Dutch historian Jan Jacob Hartsinck, the settlement "did not last long" after Jan van Ryen was left behind to govern the colony. He apparently lacked the "tact and probably fair dealing" of Jessé de Forest, who had previously attempted to found a settlement the previous year, as "the savages rose against the new settlers, killed their governor (Jan van Ryen), and demolished their houses". The survivors built several sloops with which they left the area, however only four or five were said to have survived the attack. After the colonists departure, Abraham van Peere obtained permission from the WIC to start a plantation at the nearby the Berbice River.

Van Ryen appears to have found his way back to the Netherlands. In December 1630 he registered a colony in "Quaro" with the WIC and on 25 July 1632 the Zeeland Chamber settled with him with respect to payment for his Oyapok expedition. After that there seems to be no record of him.
