= Rockcliff Christie =

Guyanese civil engineer and broadcaster (1931–2020)

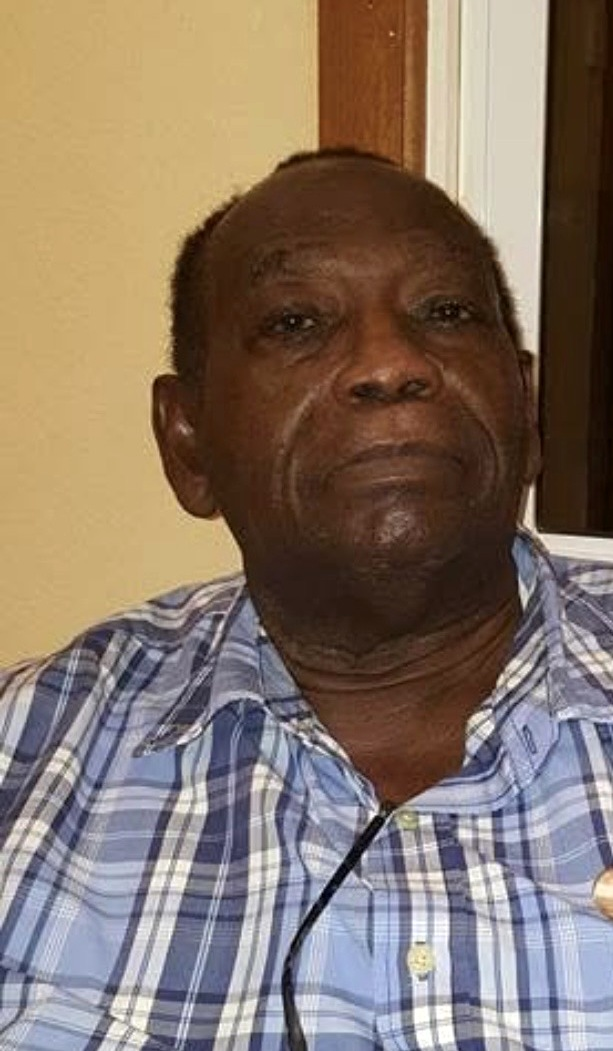
- Rockcliff Syomen Christie
- Born: Rockcliff Syomen Christie; 8 April 1931; Vergenoegen, Essequibo, British Guiana
- Died: 18 November 2020 (aged 89); New Amsterdam, Guyana
- Occupations: Civil engineer, hotelier, broadcaster
- Known for: Founder of the Little Rock companies; pioneer of television and radio in Berbice
- Spouse: Pearl Christie
- Children: 5, including Naomi Christie
- Awards: Heritage Business Award, African Business Awards (2014)

Rockcliff Syomen Christie (8 April 1931 – 18 November 2020), also spelled Rockcliffe Christie, was a Guyanese civil engineer, businessman and broadcaster. A former District Engineer of Guyana's Ministry of Works and Hydraulics whose projects included the Independence Arch in Georgetown and the Canje River Bridge, he founded the Little Rock group of businesses in New Amsterdam, Berbice — including the Little Rock Hotel, the Little Rock Television Station (LRTVS, Channel 10), which he established in 1989, and 88.5 Rock FM, launched in 2014 as the first radio station in Berbice. Stabroek News listed him among the notable Guyanese who died in 2020.

== Early life ==
Christie was born on 8 April 1931 at Vergenoegen, a village on the Essequibo coast of what was then British Guiana, the second of eleven children of cattle farmer Joseph Christie. He attended the Philadelphia Scots School and left home at fourteen for Georgetown.

In 1956 he emigrated to England, where he spent ten years working for British Railways while studying, earning an Ordinary National Certificate in Building from South West Technical College, a Higher National Certificate in Building Engineering from East Ham College, a diploma in architectural draftsmanship, and a degree in civil engineering by correspondence.

== Engineering career ==
Christie returned to Guyana in 1966, the year of the country's independence, and joined the Ministry of Works and Hydraulics as a District Engineer. According to a 2013 profile in Kaieteur News, he supervised construction works including the Independence Arch in Georgetown, the Canje River Bridge, and the Rosignol–Georgetown roadway, and spent about a decade on road construction on the West Coast of Berbice before overseeing works in East Berbice, from the Corentyne to Mara. His obituary in Stabroek News recorded that he "oversaw much of the construction of the roadways in the country especially in Berbice".

== Business and broadcasting ==
In the 1980s Christie designed and built the Little Rock Hotel at Vryman's Erven, New Amsterdam, the first of the family's businesses. In 1989 he founded the Little Rock Television Station (LRTVS), broadcasting on Channel 10 from the same premises; the station's transmitter grew from 15 to 1,000 watts, and his Stabroek News obituary described it as Berbice's first television station. (Note: The claim is contested: contemporary coverage of DTV-8 of New Amsterdam, launched in December 1993, has also described that station as Berbice's first television station. LRTVS began transmission in 1989 at low power.) In 2005 he opened a second hotel, the Little Rock Suites, on Main Street, New Amsterdam.

Christie applied for a radio licence in the early 1990s and again in 1997; a licence was granted in 2011. On 29 March 2014, he and his wife Pearl launched 88.5 Rock FM, the first radio station in Berbice, at a ceremony attended by President Donald Ramotar, who praised the couple's "pioneering role" in broadcasting; the president of the Berbice Chamber of Commerce described the Christies as "a transformational force" in the community. The businesses continued to expand: in 2016 the family opened a multi-purpose hall and complex at 10th Street, New Amsterdam, with the Guyana Chronicle reporting about 65 employees across Guyana.

In November 2014 Christie received the Heritage Business Award at Guyana's inaugural African Business Awards.

== Death ==
Christie died at his home at 67 Vryman's Erven, New Amsterdam, on 18 November 2020, aged 89. He was survived by his wife Pearl and five children, including attorney Naomi Christie. Both broadcast licences remained current with the Guyana National Broadcasting Authority as of 2024, held by Little Rock Television Station Inc. and Little Rock Radio Station Inc.
