= Louis-Henri Fourgeoud =

Dutch States Army officer (1717–1779)

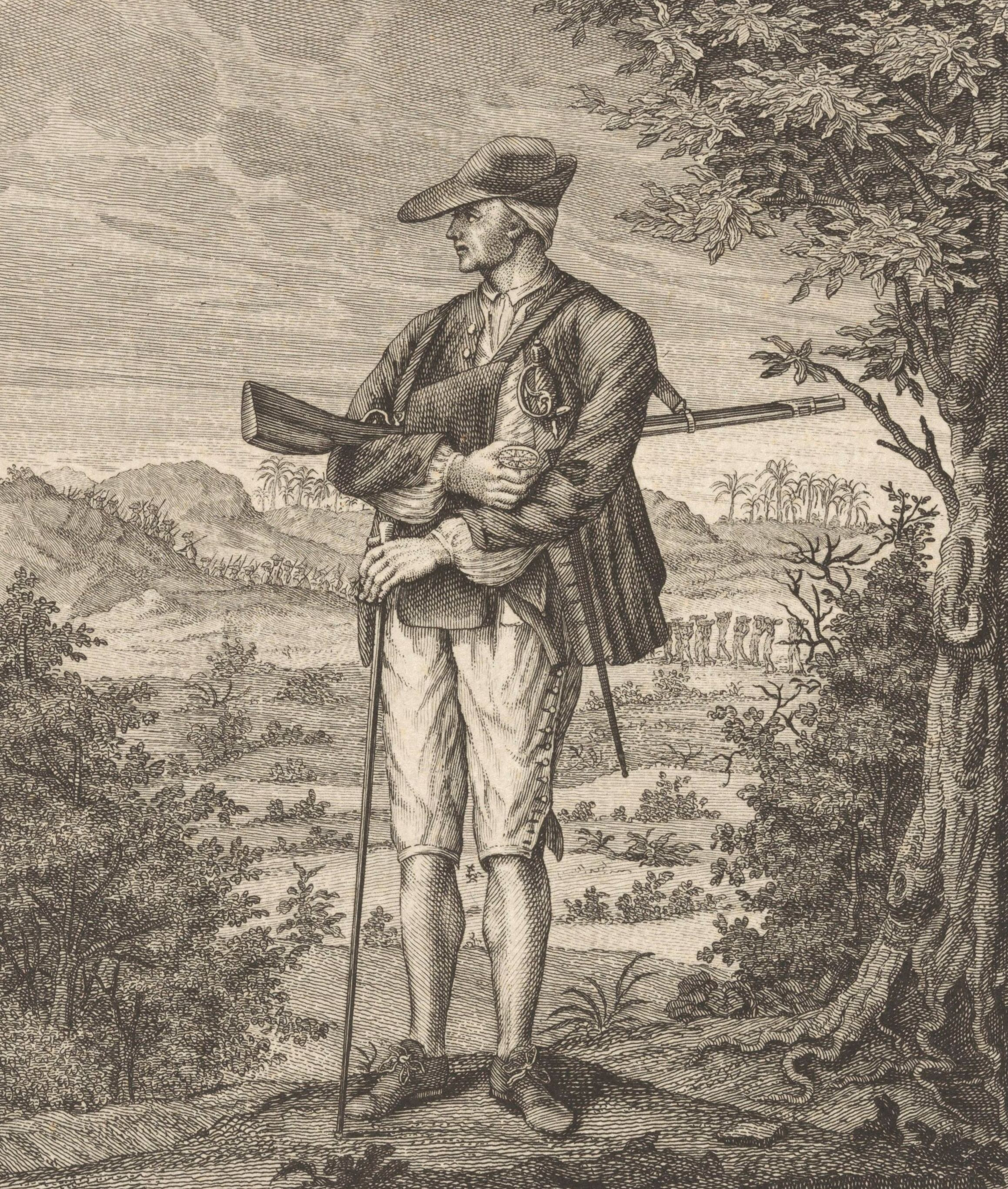
- Portrait by Theodorus Koning, c. 1779
- Born: 24 June 1717; Lausanne, Switzerland
- Died: 6 April 1779 (aged 61); The Hague, Dutch Republic
- Military career
- Allegiance: Dutch Republic
- Branch: Dutch States Army
- Rank: Colonel
- Conflicts: Berbice Rebellion; Surinam Maroon Wars

Louis-Henri Fourgeoud (24 June 1717 – 6 April 1779) was a Swiss mercenary in the Dutch States Army who played a significant role in suppressing two major slave rebellions in Dutch Guiana. Born in Lausanne, Fourgeoud became an officer in Dutch service and spent much of his career in the Dutch colonial empire, particularly in Berbice and Surinam, where he suppressed the Berbice Rebellion in 1764 and fought against maroons during the 1770s.

== Early life and background ==
Fourgeoud was baptized on 24 June 1717 in Lausanne, Vaud as the son of Jean-Jacques Fourjoud and Marguerite Dubré. His godparents were Henri and Louise Polier, indicating that his parents were close to Lausanne's high society. The Polier family connection proved lasting, as evidenced by correspondence from Jean Henri Polier de Vernand, sub-bailiff of Lausanne, dating from the 1770s. The first half of Fourgeoud's life remains poorly documented in historical records.

== Military career in Berbice ==
Fourgeoud's military service in the Dutch colonial empire is first definitively recorded during the 1763 Berbice Rebellion in the Dutch colony of Berbice, on the northern coast of South America. The rebellion began when approximately 70 slaves rose up to protest the inhumane conditions on the colony's slave plantations. Under the leadership of the former slaves Coffy and Accara, the rebels initially achieved considerable success in their revolt, which spread rapidly throughout the colony.

The course of events changed during the winter of 1763-1764, when a force of approximately 500 Dutch troops, including Fourgeoud, arrived from Europe. With support from indigenous auxiliaries and loyal slaves, the Dutch troops suppressed the rebellion in August 1764. While most of the 500 soldiers returned to Europe shortly afterwards, Fourgeoud remained in Berbice until 1765, commanding a company of 100 volunteers at the rank of major, and was tasked with preventing any new insurrections from breaking out.

== Surinam expedition ==
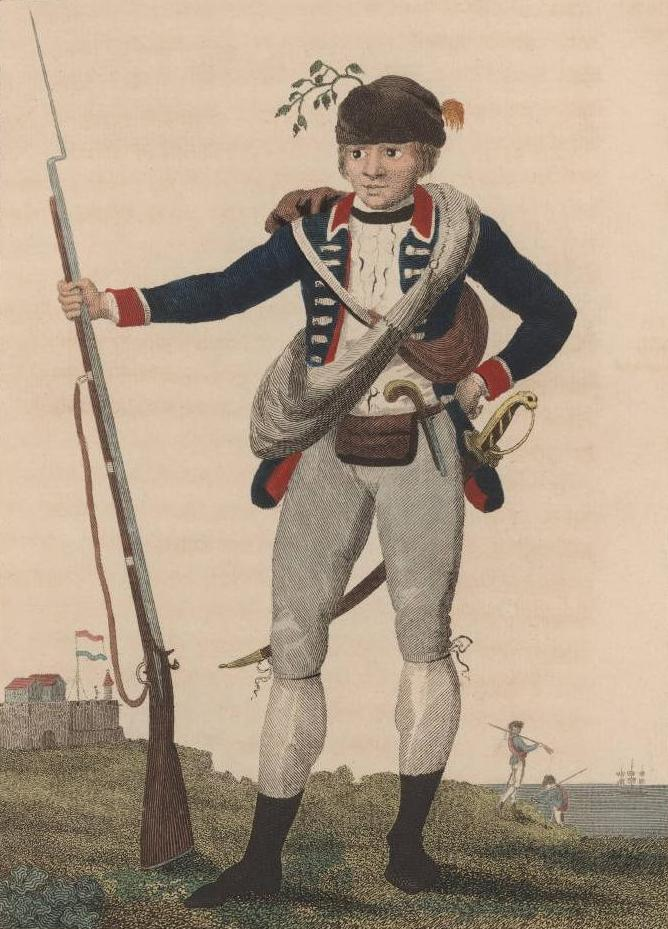
A private of Fourgeoud's corps

This so incensed me that I not only wished him in Hell, but myself also, to have the satisfaction of seeing him burn.

— John Gabriel Stedman, writing about his reaction to Fourgeoud's refusal to grant him a furlough and owed pay.

During the 1760s and 1770s, the Dutch colony of Surinam was engaged in a low-intensity conflict with groups of maroons, former slaves who had escaped slavery and established independent communities on the colonial frontier. The maroons, who were led by leaders such as Boni, Aluku, Coromantjn Codjo and Suku, continued to attack Dutch colonists prompting the colonial government to request military assistance from Europe. In 1773, Fourgeoud, now at the rank of colonel, led an expeditionary corps which was sent to defeat the maroons.

The military campaign in Surinam proved extremely costly in human terms. Of the 1,200 European soldiers under Fourgeoud's command, only 100 survived the expedition, with most dying from tropical diseases and exhaustion rather than combat. In 1796, the Dutch-British army officer John Gabriel Stedman, who had served in the expedition, published an account of the military campaign and daily life in Surinam. Stedman described Fourgeoud as an energetic but ruthless leader who harassed his own troops and brutally treated captured maroons.

When the maroons fled to the nearby French colony of Cayenne in September 1776, Fourgeoud considered his mission accomplished. Eager to return to Europe with his remaining soldiers, he was forced to wait for the arrival of fresh Dutch troops before travelling to the Hague in 1778, where he died the following year.

=== Assessment and controversy ===
The extent to which Fourgeoud successfully defeated the maroons in Surinam remains a matter of historical controversy. While Fourgeoud himself considered himself the savior of the colony, Surinam's governor and colonists believed that the maroons could have been defeated more effectively and with fewer losses. The long-term effectiveness of his campaign was also questionable, as beginning in 1789, groups of maroons returned from their exile in Cayenne and launched fresh attacks against white colonists in Surinam.

== Death ==
Fourgeoud died on 6 April 1779 in The Hague, Dutch Republic, shortly after returning from his final campaign in Surinam.

== Bibliography ==
- Blair, Barbara L. "Wolfert Simon van Hoogenheim in the Berbice slave revolt of 1763-1764." Bijdragen tot de Taal-, Land- en Volkenkunde 140, no. 1 (1984): 56-76.
- David, Thomas; Etemad, Bouda; Schaufelbuehl, Janick Marina. La Suisse et l'esclavage des Noirs. 2005, pp. 95-99.
- Fatah-Black, Karwan. "A Swiss village in the Dutch tropics. The limitations of empire-centred approaches to the early modern Atlantic world." BMGN – Low Countries Historical Review 128, no. 1 (2013): 31-52.
- Fässler, Hans. Une Suisse esclavagiste. Voyage dans un pays au-dessus de tout soupçon. 2007 (German edition 2005).
- Hoogbergen, Wim. "Aluku." Nieuwe West-Indische Gids 63, no. 3-4 (1989): 175-198.
- Kars, Marjoleine. "'Wij beleeven hier droevige tyden'. Europeanen, Indianen en Afrikanen in de Berbice slavenopstand, 1763-1764." In Geweld in de West. Een militaire geschiedenis van de Nederlandse Atlantische wereld, 1600-1800, edited by Victor Enthoven, Henk den Heijer, and Han Jordaan, 183-215. 2013.
- Knaap, Gerrit; Heijer, Henk den; Jong, Michiel de. Oorlogen overzee. Militair optreden door compagnie en staat buiten Europa, 1595-1814. 2015.
- Krauer, Philipp. Swiss Mercenaries in the Dutch East Indies. A Transimperial History of Military Labour, 1848-1914. 2024.
- Morren, Pierre. "Au service de Leurs Hautes Puissances: le colonel Louis-Henri Fourgeoud." Versailles 53/54 (1973/1974): 55-60.
- Stedman, John Gabriel. Narrative of a Five Years' Expedition against the Revolted Negroes of Surinam. 2 volumes. 1796.
- Veyrassat, Béatrice. Histoire de la Suisse et des Suisses dans la marche du monde (XVIIe siècle-Première Guerre mondiale). Espaces – Circulations – Echanges. 2018.
