= Vincent Armstrong =

Anglican priest

The Ven. (Hampden) Vincent Armstrong) (1891–1961) was an Anglican priest in the Caribbean in the first half of the 20th century.

Armstrong was ordained in 1916. After a curacy at Castries he held incumbencies in Grenada, Saint Vincent, Berbice and Barbados. He was Archdeacon of Saint Vincent from 1926 to 1927; of Berbice from 1938 until 1942; and of Demerara from 1942 to 1943.

He died in 1961.
