= Philip Moore (artist) =

Guyanese artist (1921–2012)

- Born: 1921; Manchester village, Corentyne, Berbice, Guyana
- Died: 13 May 2012 (aged 90–91); Lancaster village, Corentyne, Berbice, Guyana
- Notable work: 1763 Coffij Monument

Philip Moore (1921 – 13 May 2012) was a self-taught Guyanese sculptor and painter known for designing the 1763 Monument in Georgetown, Guyana. During his career, he held artist residencies at Livingstone College and Princeton University, where he taught wood sculpture. In 1941, he became a Grand Master of the Jordanite religion, and considered his faith to be an integral part of his practice and teaching.

== Early life ==
Moore was born in Guyana, in Manchester on the Corentyne Coast. His parents wanted him to become a lawyer so Moore started working in a "cane field" to supplement the family's income and save money for his studies. At some point while working in the fields, which Moore credits to divine intervention, he decided to become an artist.

He earned a certificate from the Manchester Church of Scotland School in 1938 which was the end of his formal education.

== Career ==
in 1970, Moore was appointed as Artist in Residence and tutor in wood sculpture at Princeton University. After his return from Princeton, Moore started working at the Burrowes School of Art.

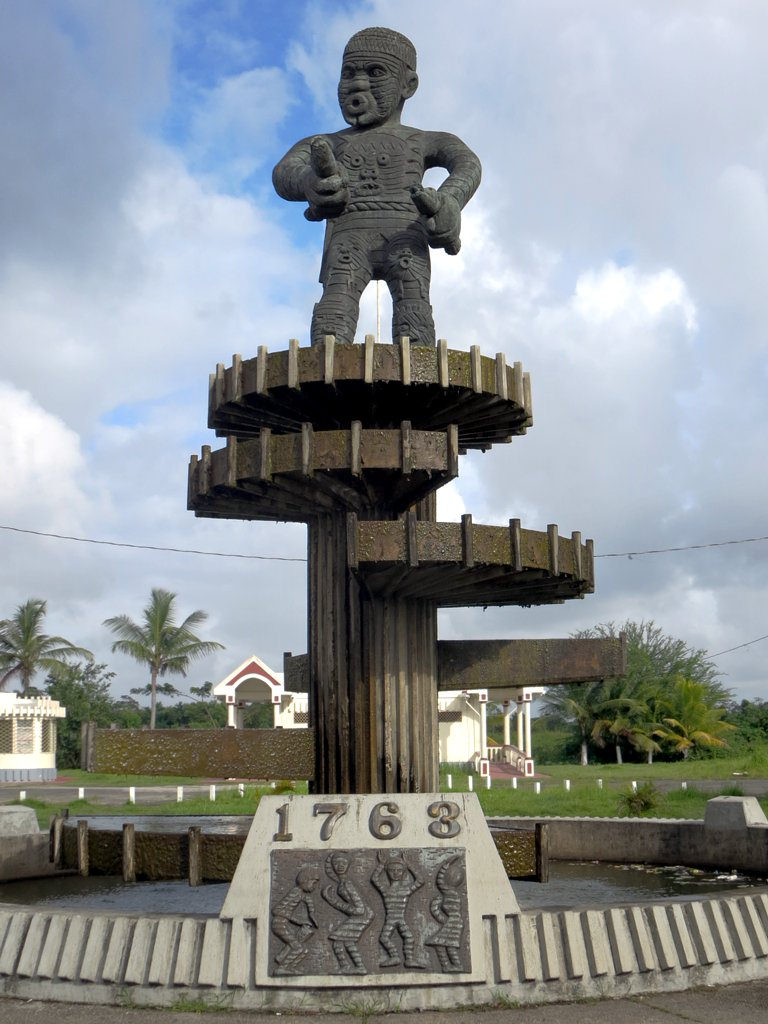
1763 Monument designed by Moore (1976). On Square of the Revolution in Georgetown, Guyana.

In 1976, Moore unveiled his most famous creation, the 1763 Monument, which towers over the Square of the Revolution in Georgetown. It commemorates the uprising by the slaves in 1763 in Dutch colonial Berbice, which was led by Cuffy, (Note: Also spelt as Coffij, Coffy, Kofi, Kofi Badu, or Koffi.) an enslaved Akan man brought from the Dutch Gold Coast (now south Ghana). The monument symbolises the struggle and liberation of the Guyanese people.

== Legacy ==
The government of Guyana has purchased more than 150 of Moore's works which are housed as part of the national collection at the National Gallery, Castellani House.

In 2009, Moore received a lifetime achievement award and several plaques from the Guyanese Ministry of Culture.
