= Dutch Guiana =

Dutch Guiana may refer to:

- Dutch colonisation of the Guianas, the coastal region between the Orinoco and Amazon rivers in South America
- Surinam (Dutch colony), commonly called "Dutch Guiana" after the loss of other large colonies in the area
- Suriname, the present-day country sometimes referred to as Dutch Guiana

== See also ==
- The Guianas, French Guiana, Guyana, and Suriname in South America
