= Society of Berbice =

The Society of Berbice (Dutch: Sociëteit van Berbice) was founded on 24 October 1720 by the owners of the colony of Berbice currently in Guyana. These owners (Arnold Dix, Pieter Schuurmans, Cornelis van Peere, and brothers Nicolaas and Hendrik van Hoorn) had acquired the colony from the French on 24 October 1714, who in turn had occupied the colony which was previously a hereditary fief in the possession of the Van Peere family.

In 1720, the five owners of the colony founded a Society of Berbice in a similar fashion to the Society of Suriname, which governed the neighbouring colony, in order to raise more capital for the colony. Both brothers shared one quarter of the company, and could only cast one vote. The Society was a public company listed on the Amsterdam Stock Exchange.

In the years following, Berbice became the second most flourishing Dutch colony in the Guianas after Suriname, consisting of 12 plantations owned by the society, 93 private plantations along the Berbice River, and 20 plantations along the Canje River. The colony was dealt a severe blow when a slave uprising broke out under the leadership of Coffy in February 1763. The uprising led to a steep population decline, abandonment and destruction of many plantations, and serious financial problems for the Society.

In 1795, after the dissolution of the Dutch West India Company, the company decided to sell its possessions. The company remained in operation after Berbice was ceded to Great Britain. In November 1818, their last plantations were sold to Davidson’s, Barkly & Co, and after selling out the last investors, the company closed their offices in 1821.

== See also ==
- List of trading companies
