= Mission Chapel, New Amsterdam =

Church in New Amsterdam, Guyana

Coordinates: 6.24647°N 57.52007°W

Mission Chapel, a Congregational Church, was built around 1814 in New Amsterdam, Berbice, Guyana. Mission Chapel is located at 12 Chapel Street, New Amsterdam, Berbice.

== History ==
It was founded by the Rev. John Wray, and was the first church to open its doors to slaves, and the first without separate seating.

A two-storey church manse was built in 1899.

In 1969, the Rev. Pat Matthews became the first Guyanese pastor at Mission Chapel. In 1978 he was honoured for meritorious service among the Amerindians.
