= Torani Canal =

Coordinates: 5°49′N 57°27′W

The Torani Canal in northeastern Guyana serves to move water from the Berbice River into the Canje River. It was to serve as irrigation for the sugar industry, and subsequently the rice industry.

The canal is 14 miles long.

It was rehabilitated by BK International Inc. under the supervision of the Caribbean Engineering Management Consultancy Guyana Limited in collaboration with Mott Mac Donald. The dual purpose of the canal is to transfer water from the higher elevation along the Berbice River to irrigate the backlands of the Black Bush Polder rice cultivation and at the same time to reduce the excessive surface runoff precipitation during the rainy season. Hence, the Canje River is at a lower elevation and it's the shortest distance of the two to the Atlantic Ocean “storehouse”.

== See also ==
- Agriculture in Guyana
- East Demerara Water Conservancy
