= Crab Island, Guyana =

Island in Guyana

Coordinates: 6.283°N 57.517°W

Crab Island
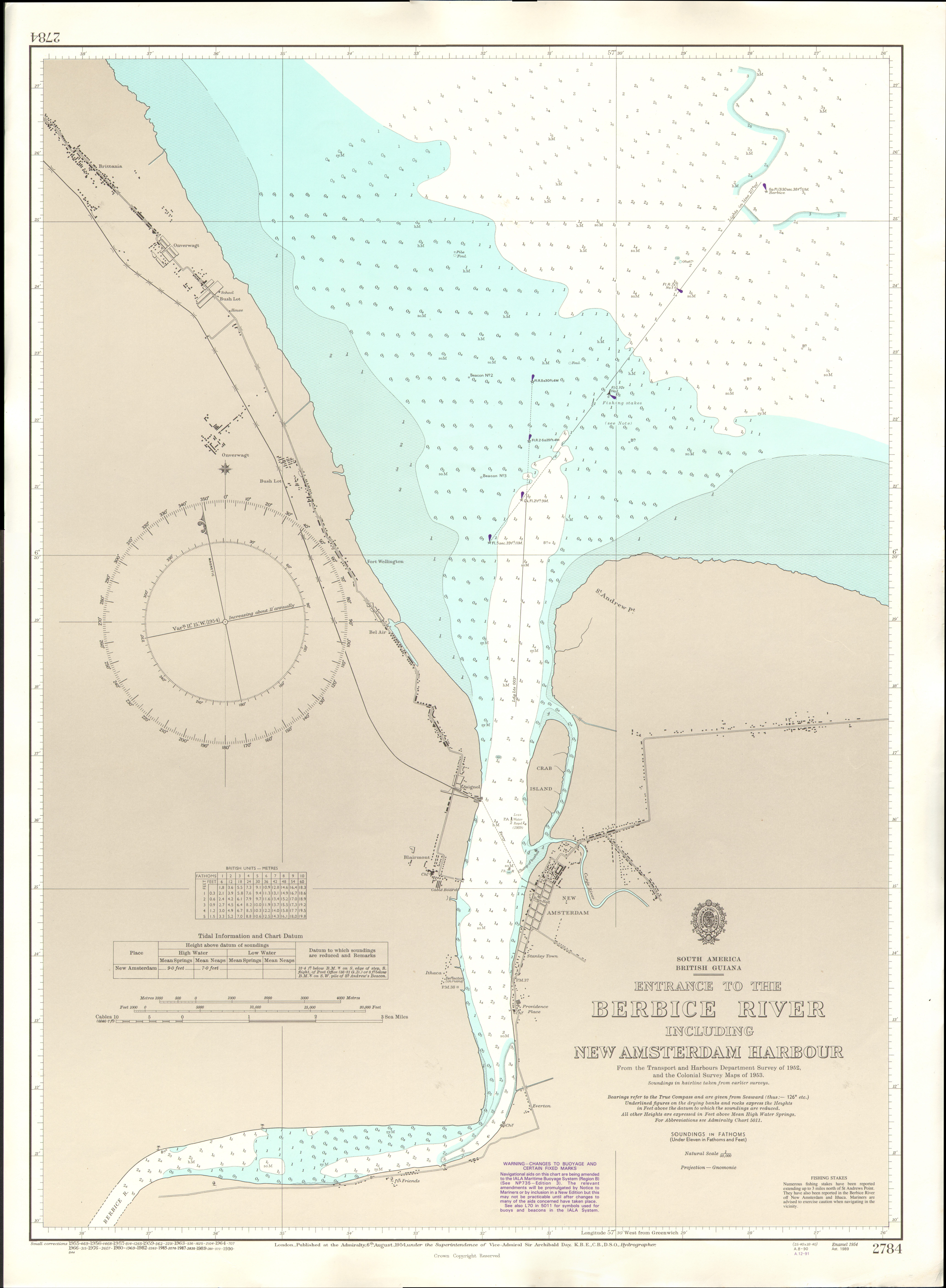
- Interactive map of Crab Island

Geography
- Location: Berbice River mouth, Guyana

Crab Island is an island located in the mouth of the Berbice River in Guyana.

Crab Island is so named due to the presence of numerous crabs there, and is approximately 1.5 km (1 mi) in circumference. Before the British took over Berbice in 1815, the Dutch had a fort here called St. Andries, and the island was known as Krabbeneiland.
