= Kalkuni =

Coordinates: 14°36′N 74°50′E

kakuni
- village
- Interactive map of kakuni
- Country: India
- State: Karnataka
- District: Mandya
- Talukas: Malavalli

Population (2001)
  - Total: 8,328

Languages
  - Official: Kannada
- Time zone: UTC+5:30 (IST)

Kalkuni is a village in the southern state of Karnataka, India. It is located in the Malavalli taluk of Mandya district in Karnataka.

== Demographics ==
As of 2001 India census, Kalkuni had a population of 8328 with 4342 males and 3986 females.

== See also ==
- Mandya
- Districts of Karnataka
