= Abraham van Peere =

Dutch merchant

Abraham van Peere was a Dutch merchant from Vlissingen in the County of Zeeland. In 1602, a charter was given by the States General of the Dutch Republic to his father Jan van Peere to found a colony on the Berbice River on the coast of Guyana. Abraham van Peere eventually founded the colony of Berbice in 1627. He was also made patroon of Arguin in 1633.

Apparently some disputes arose between the Van Peere family and the Second Dutch West India Company (WIC), which was founded to succeed the First Dutch West India Company that went bankrupt in 1674. The WIC was given the monopoly on trade with the West Indies, which conflicted with Van Peere's charter. This was resolved when on 14 September 1678 a charter was signed which established Berbice as a hereditary fief of the WIC, in the possession of the Van Peere family.

In November 1712, Berbice was briefly occupied by the French under Jacques Cassard, as part of the War of the Spanish Succession. Since the Van Peere family did not want to pay a ransom to the French to free the colony, the colony reverted to French rule, who subsequently sold it on 24 October 1714 to the Dutch brothers Nicolaas and Hendrik van Hoorn, Arnold Dix, Pieter Schuurmans, and Cornelis van Peere.
