= New Amsterdam, Guyana =

Regional capital in Guyana

New Amsterdam
- Town and regional capital
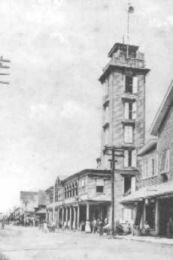
- New Amsterdam Town Hall (1950)

- Location in Guyana
- Coordinates: 6°15′N 57°31′W
- Country: Guyana
- Region: East Berbice-Corentyne

Population (2022 census)
  - Total: 14,762

New Amsterdam (Dutch: Nieuw Amsterdam) is the regional capital of East Berbice-Corentyne, Guyana and one of the country's largest towns. It is 100 kilometres (62 mi) from the capital, Georgetown and located on the eastern bank of the Berbice River, 6 km (4 mi) upriver from its mouth at the Atlantic Ocean, and immediately south of the Canje River. New Amsterdam's population is 14,762 inhabitants as of 2022.

== History ==
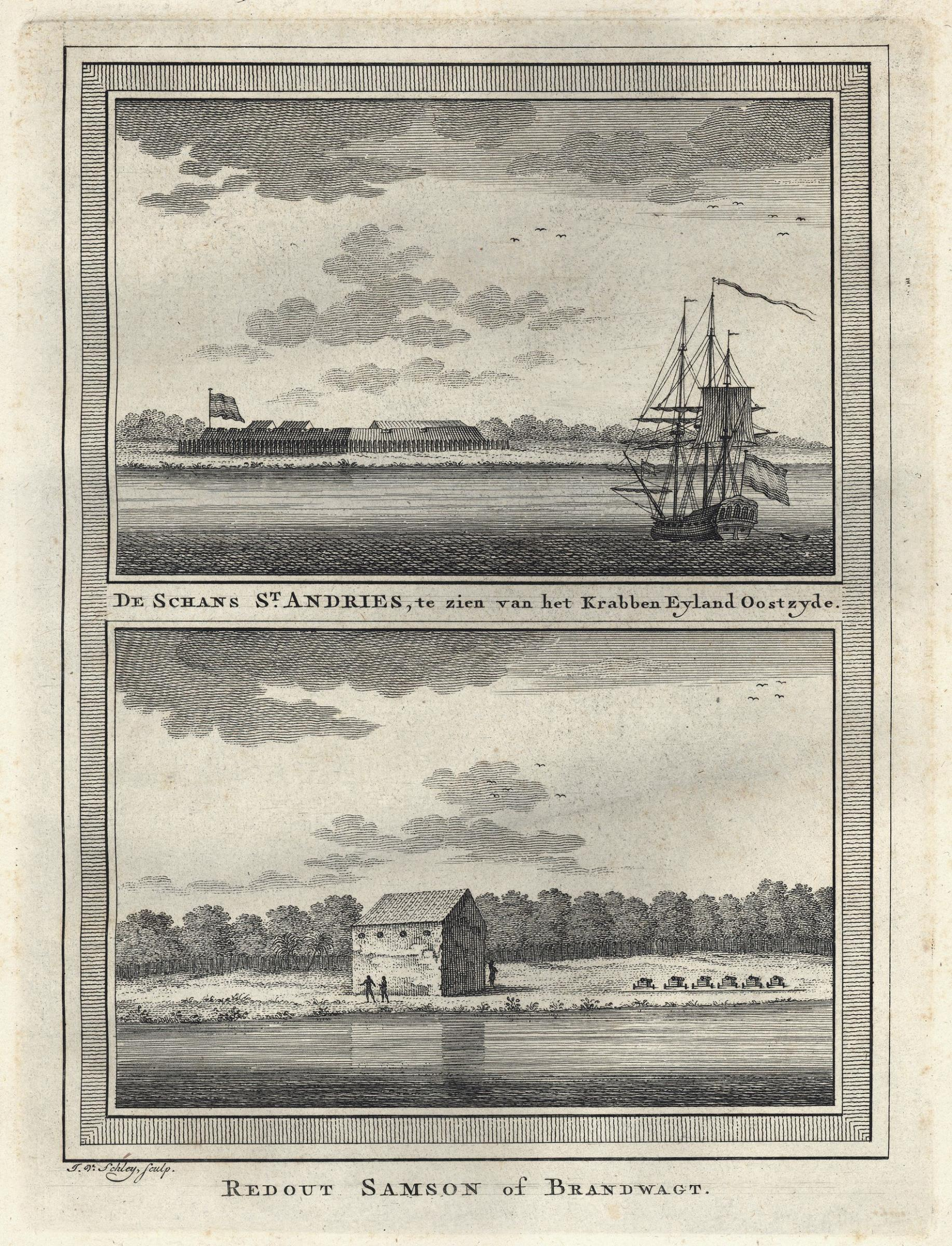
The Sint Andries bulwark around 1770

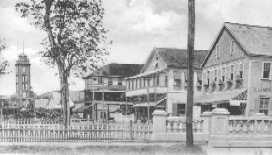
View of The Strand (1920s)

The present town is fairly small, consisting of three main roads with about a dozen cross streets. It has a mayor, Kirt Wynter, and a thriving market. From New Amsterdam you can get to Crabwood Creek (about 72 km (45 mi) away) via the Courantyne River or to the East Canje area of Berbice. A road also leads up the Berbice River bank to the town of Mara about 40 km (25 mi) south.

== Points of interest ==
New Amsterdam serves as a port and has a government-run hospital. The town has many old colonial buildings, some dating back to the time of Dutch colonisation. Mission Chapel has been designated a National Heritage Site.

The main schools in New Amsterdam are Berbice High School, Berbice Educational Institute, Vryman's Erven Secondary, Tutorial Academy, and New Amsterdam Secondary formerly known as New Amsterdam Multilateral High School (opened in 1975).

There is a ground west of Esplanade Road called Esplanade; it was a picnicking site.

== Travel ==
There are several hotels in the town, including Church View Guest House, Astor Hotel, Little Rock Hotel, Leisure Inn Hotel, The Penguin International Hotel, and the Parkway Hotel. The newly built Little Rock Suites on Main Street (Not to be confused with Little Rock Hotel in Vryman's Erven).

In December 2008, travel to New Amsterdam was made easier by the opening of the Berbice Bridge providing a direct connection to Georgetown.

== Notable people ==
- David Dabydeen (b. 1955), novelist, poet and academic
- Jocelyn Dow (b. 1951), human rights activist and entrepreneur
- Jill Gomez (1942–2026), soprano singer
- Carl Barrington Greenidge (b. 1949), former Vice-President
- Edward Luckhoo (1912–1998), Governor General and former acting President
- Lionel Luckhoo (1914–1997), lawyer and politician
- Edgar Mittelholzer (1909–1965), novelist
- Shridath Ramphal (1928–2024), former Commonwealth Secretary-General

== Utilities ==
New Amsterdam has three television stations: DTV-8, located in the heart of the town, Little Rock Television Station (LRTVS) Channel 10 located in Vryman's Erven, TVG located in St. Ann Street. LRTVS was the first television station in Berbice. The first radio station broadcasting from New Amsterdam was also launched in 2014 by Little Rock and broadcasts on FM 88.5 MHz.

== Climate ==
New Amsterdam has a borderline tropical monsoon climate (Köppen Am), bordering upon a tropical rainforest climate (Af) with heavy rainfall most of the year and a drier period in September and October.

Climate data for New Amsterdam, Guyana (1991–2020)
| Month | Jan | Feb | Mar | Apr | May | Jun | Jul | Aug | Sep | Oct | Nov | Dec | Year |
|---|---|---|---|---|---|---|---|---|---|---|---|---|---|
| Daily mean °C (°F) | 26.6 (79.9) | 26.6 (79.9) | 27.1 (80.8) | 27.4 (81.3) | 27.3 (81.1) | 27.1 (80.8) | 27.2 (81.0) | 27.7 (81.9) | 28.3 (82.9) | 28.5 (83.3) | 28.1 (82.6) | 27.2 (81.0) | 27.4 (81.3) |
| Average rainfall mm (inches) | 175.1 (6.89) | 120.2 (4.73) | 94.7 (3.73) | 147.8 (5.82) | 278.6 (10.97) | 274.4 (10.80) | 252.9 (9.96) | 154.8 (6.09) | 84.8 (3.34) | 55.9 (2.20) | 143.2 (5.64) | 225.4 (8.87) | 2,007.8 (79.05) |
| Average rainy days (≥ 1.0 mm) | 13 | 11 | 9 | 12 | 18 | 18 | 16 | 11 | 6 | 5 | 9 | 14 | 140.1 |
| Mean monthly sunshine hours | 192.9 | 182.9 | 202.9 | 185.2 | 165.4 | 166.5 | 212.7 | 252.7 | 239.8 | 250.0 | 227.9 | 164.1 | 2,443 |
Source: NOAA

== Sister cities ==
- Midland, Texas (United States)
