= Berbice River =

River in eastern Guyana

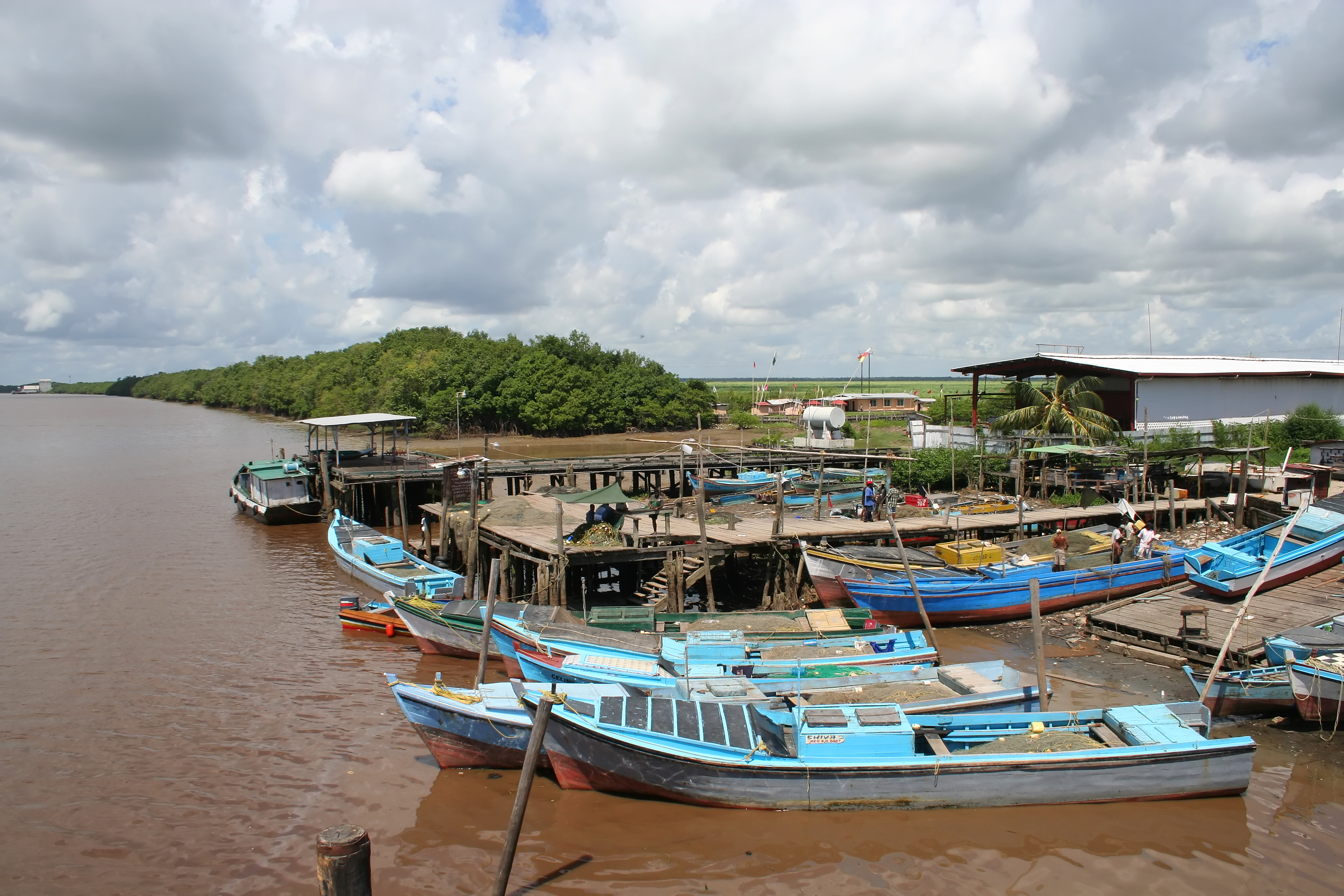
- Berbice River

- Location of mouth

Location
- Country: Guyana

Physical characteristics
- Source: Rupununi Region
- Mouth: Atlantic Ocean
  - location: Crab Island
  - coordinates: 6°17′N 57°32′W.
- Length: 595 km (370 mi)
- Basin size: 16,600 km^{2} (6,400 sq mi)
- Discharge
  - average: 300 m^{3}/s (11,000 cu ft/s)

The Berbice River /bərˈbiːs/, located in eastern Guyana, is one of the country's major rivers. It rises in the highlands of the Rupununi region and flows northward for 595 kilometres (370 mi) through dense forests to the coastal plain. The river's tidal limit is between 160 and 320 km (99–199 mi) from the sea.

== Geography ==
Obstructed by shallows at its estuary, the Berbice River's mouth is the location of Crab Island, opposite the mouth of the Canje River, the Berbice's main tributary.

Quantity of water based on the streamflow of the gauging station at Itabu Falls (04'52'N0'50'13'W) is 40,800 L/min (9,000 imp gal/min; 10,800 US gal/min).

== History ==
The Dutch established a foothold on the Berbice River as early as 1629 for trading with the Amerindians. Plantations formed along the river, and it later became the location of a major slave uprising. In 1627, the settlement of Nassau (the name was used for many of the Dutch forts in the seventeenth century) was founded by the Dutch West India Company. The area was passed over to the British in 1815 and merged with the neighboring British Guiana.

The town of New Amsterdam is situated on the river's east bank, approximately four miles inside the river's estuary, where it enters the Atlantic Ocean. A new bridge over the river joins New Amsterdam to Rosignol. Other communities on the Berbice River include Everton, Mara, Takama, Kalkuni and Kwakwani.

The river has served to transport Bauxite from the major mine at Kwakwani (currently owned by Rusal).

== Infrastructure ==
A ferry service transferred goods and people between Kwakwani and New Amsterdam, but was discontinued in the 1990s.

Torani Canal was built to allow water to flow from the Berbice River into the Canje River for maintaining water levels for irrigation purposes.

On December 23, 2008, construction of the Berbice Bridge linking D’Edward Village, Crab Island, and the Courantyne Highway was completed.

== See also ==
- Berbice
- Courantyne River
- Mining in Guyana
