= Canje River =

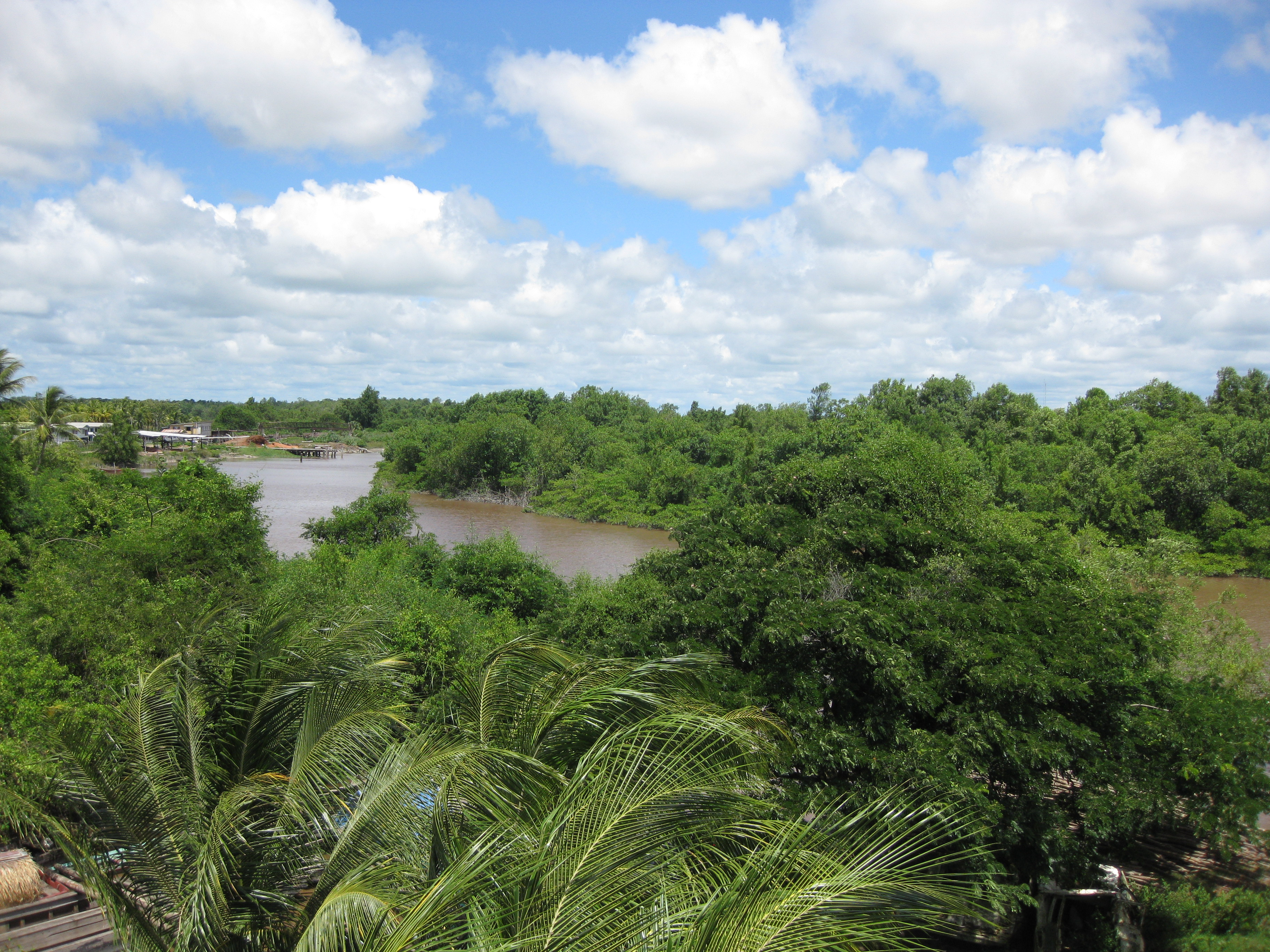

Location
- Country: Guyana

Physical characteristics
- Mouth: Berbice
  - coordinates: 6.2619°N 57.5198°W

The Canje River (sometimes referred to as Canje Creek), located in northeastern Guyana, is the main tributary of the Berbice River. It runs roughly parallel to the Atlantic Ocean coast in East Berbice-Corentyne, region 6.

The settlement of Baracara is on the Canje. It was settled by escaped slaves in the 1800s, and the river is still an important mode of transportation.

== History ==
The Dutch established an outpost, Concordia Post, on the river. In 1763 a slave revolt began on two plantations on the Canje River.

== Economics ==
The Canje River supplies water to the Guyana Sugar Corporation's Skeldon Estate (c. 12,000 acres; 49 km^{2}); Albion Estate (20,000 acres; 81 km^{2}); and Rose Hall Estate (12,000 to 14,000 acres; 49 to 57 km^{2}). The Manarabisi Rice Cultivation (17,000 acres; 69 km^{2}) and Black Bush Polder (17,000 acres; 69 km^{2}) also depend on this river.

In addition to agriculture, the land of the Canje basin has been of some interest by international firms for production of biofuel.

== Fauna ==
Guyana's national bird, the hoatzin, also known as the Canje pheasant is named for its presence in the river.
