= List of place names of Dutch origin =

To be included in this list, the place must have an article on Wikipedia or must have inline references showing the name is or was indeed Dutch.

== Populated places ==
=== Countries ===
- New Holland, AUS
- New Holland, BRA
- Mauritius
- New Zealand
- Oranje-Vrijstaat
- Zuid-Afrikaansche Republiek
- Zoutpansbergsche Republiek
- Republiek Zwellendam
- Republic of Lydenburg
- Republic of Utrecht
- Republiek Graaff-Reinet
- Kaap de Goede Hoop

=== Provinces and regions ===
- Arnhem Land, AUS
- Baviaanskloof Mega Reserve, Eastern Cape, ZA
- Bergen County, New Jersey, USA
- Nassau County, New York, USA
- Mount Wilhelmina, former name of Puncak Trikora, Indonesia
- New Netherland, USA
- Nuytsland, Western Australia, AUS
- Oranje-Vrijstaat Province, ZA
- Overberg (Over 't Berg), Western Cape, ZA
- Schuyler County, New York, USA
- Schuylkill County, Pennsylvania, USA
- Tasman Peninsula, AUS
- Tasman Region, NZ
- Transvaal Province, ZA

=== Islands ===
- Amsterdam Island, Spitsbergen
- Amsterdam Island, Southern Indian Ocean
- Bear Island, Norway
- Bedloe's Island, now Liberty Island, New York-NJ, USA
- Block Island, Rhode Island, USA
- Coney Island, New York, USA
- Crocodile Islands, Northern Territory, AUS
- Dirk Hartog Island, Western Australia, AUS
- Delft, Sri Lanka
- Dwars-in-den-weg Island, now Sangiang Island, Banten, ID
- Easter Island, CHL
- Fishers Island, New York, USA
- Gorée, SEN
- Groote Eyland, Northern Territory, AUS
- Hermite Islands, CHL
- Hoorn Islands, Wallis and Futuna
- Houtman Abrolhos, Western Australia, AUS
- Jan Mayen, Norway
- Jost Van Dyke, BVI
- Kherkof Island, now Kelor Island, Thousand Islands district, Jakarta, ID
- Kuiper Island, now Kahyangan Island, Thousand Islands district, Jakarta, ID
- Lang Island, Sunda Strait, ID
- Long Island, New York, USA
- Manhattan, New York, USA
- Maria Island, Tasmania, AUS
- Maatsuyker Islands, Tasmania, AUS
- New Holland Island, Saint Petersburg, RUS
- Ny-Friesland, Spitsbergen
- Noten Eylant, New York, USA
- Onrust Island, Thousand Islands district, Jakarta, ID
- Purmerend Island, now Bidadari Island, Thousand Islands district, Jakarta, ID
- Rhode Island, Rhode Island, USA
- Rikers Island, New York, USA
- Robbeneiland, Western Cape, ZA
- Roosevelt Island, New York, USA
- Rottnest Island, Western Australia, AUS
- Schouten Island, Tasmania, AUS
- Schouten Islands, now Biak Islands, Indonesia
- Sebald Islands
- Spitsbergen, Svalbard, Norway
- St Francis Island, South Australia, AUS
- St Peter Island, South Australia, AUS
- Staten Island, New York, USA
- Stateneiland, Argentina
- Tasmania, AUS
- Three Kings Islands, NZ
- Van Diemen's Land, AUS
- Vanderlin Island, Northern Territory, AUS
- Verlaten Island, Sunda Strait, ID
- Wakenaam Island, Essequibo River, Guyana
- Wessel Islands, Northern Territory, AUS

== Castles, forts & trade posts ==
- Fort Amsterdam, Ambon, ID
- Fort Belgica, Banda Neira, ID
- Fort Beversreede, Pennsylvania, USA
- Fort Casimir, Delaware, USA
- Fort Daspoortrand, Pretoria, ZA
- Fort Duurstede, Saparua, ID
- Fort Nassau, New York, USA
- Fort Nassau, New Jersey, USA
- Fort Hoop, Connecticut, USA
- Fort Klapperkop, Pretoria, ZA
- Fort Orange, New York, USA
- Fort Oranje (Ternate), Ternate, ID
- Fort Prins Frederik, Jakarta, ID (demolished, now Istiqlal Mosque Complex)
- Fort Rotterdam, Makassar, ID
- Fort Schanskop, Pretoria, ZA
- Fort Van den Bosch, Ngawi, ID
- Fort Van den Capellen, Batu sangkar, ID
- Fort Vastenburg, Surakarta, ID
- Fort Vredeburg, Yogyakarta, ID
- Fort Wilhelmus, New Jersey, USA
- Fort Wonderboompoort, Pretoria, ZA
- Fort Zeelandia, SUR
- Kasteel de Goede Hoop, Western Cape, ZA
- Kievits Hoek, Connecticut, USA
- Peterhof Palace, Saint Petersburg, Russia
- Smeerenburg, Svalbard

== Cities, towns and neighborhoods ==
=== Cities ===
- Amsterdam, Missouri, USA
- Amsterdam, New York, USA
- Batavia, now Jakarta, ID
- Batavia, New York, USA
- Batavia, Illinois, USA
- Batavia, Iowa, USA
- Blauvelt, New York, USA
- Bloemfontein, ZA
- Bluefields, NIC
- Breda, Iowa, USA
- Brielle, New Jersey, USA
- Buitenzorg, now Bogor, ID
- Dutch Harbor, AK, USA
- Fort de Kock, now Bukittinggi, ID
- Groningen, Minnesota, USA
- Groningen, SUR
- Grootfontein, Namibia
- Harlingen, Texas, USA
- Hoboken, New Jersey, USA
- Holland, Michigan, USA
- Hollandia, now Jayapura, ID
- Johannesburg, ZA
- Kaapstad, ZA
- Lelydorp, SUR
- Nassau, BHS
- Nederland, Colorado, USA
- Nederland, Texas, USA
- New Amsterdam, Guyana
- New Amsterdam, New York, USA
- Oranjestad, Aruba
- Oosthaven, now Bandar Lampung, ID
- Pietermaritzburg, ZA
- Point-à-Pitre, Guadeloupe
- Pretoria, ZA
- Rensselaer, New York, USA
- Rotterdam, New York, USA
- Schenectady, New York, USA
- Wiltwyck, New York, USA
- Van Buren, Arkansas, USA
- Vancouver, Canada
- Willemstad, Curaçao
- Williamsburg, Virginia, USA
- Windhoek, Namibia
- Yonkers, New York, USA
- Zeeland, Michigan, USA
- Zeeland, North Dakota, USA

=== Towns ===
- Alkmaar, Mpumalanga, South Africa
- Alkmaar, Suriname
- Amersfoort, Mpumalanga, South Africa
- Amsterdam, California, USA
- Amsterdam, New York, USA
- Amsterdam, Jefferson County, Ohio, USA
- Amsterdam, Licking County, Ohio, USA
- Amsterdam, Pennsylvania, USA
- Amsterdam, Texas, USA
- Amsterdam, Virginia, USA
- Amsterdam, Montana, USA
- Amsterdam, Mpumalanga, South Africa
- Amsterdam, Saskatchewan, Canada
- Ansnorveldt, Ontario, Canada
- Antwerp Township, Michigan, USA
- Baardscheerders Bosch, Western Cape, South Africa
- Barentsburg, Svalbard, Norway
- Batavia Township, Michigan, USA
- Batavia, New York, USA
- Batavia, Ohio, USA
- Batavia, Wisconsin, USA
- Beterverwagting, Guyana
- Beukendaal, New York, USA
- Bloubergstrand, Western Cape, South Africa
- Bluefields, Jamaica
- The Bottom, Saba
- Bredasdorp, Western Cape, South Africa
- Calitzdorp, Western Cape, South Africa
- Claverack, New York, USA
- Coeymans, New York, USA
- De Doorns, Western Cape, South Africa
- De Hollandsche Molen, Western Cape, South Africa
- Delft, Minnesota, USA
- De Rust, Western Cape, South Africa
- Town of DeRuyter, New York, USA
- Village of DeRuyter, New York, USA
- Deventer, Missouri, USA
- De Vlugt, Western Cape, South Africa
- Domburg, Suriname
- Dordrecht, Eastern Cape, South Africa
- Drakenstein, Western Cape, South Africa
- Edam, Saskatchewan, Canada
- Ermelo, Mpumalanga, South Africa
- Esau and Jacob, Guyana
- Flushing, Cornwall, UK
- Franschhoek, Western Cape, South Africa
- Genadendal, Western Cape, South Africa
- Goedverwacht, Western Cape, South Africa
- Gouda, Western Cape, South Africa
- Graaff-Reinet, Eastern Cape, South Africa
- Greenbush (North and East), New York, USA
- Groningen, Suriname
- Groote Laagte, Botswana
- Guilderland, New York, USA
- Haarlem, Western Cape, South Africa
- Hague, North Dakota, USA
- Hague, New York, USA
- Hague, Saskatchewan, Canada
- Harlem, Ohio, USA
- Hartenbosch, Western Cape, South Africa
- Haverstraw, New York, USA
- Hempstead, New York, USA
- Hermanus, Western Cape, South Africa
- Heroldt, Western Cape, South Africa
- Holambra, Brazil
- Holland, Manitoba, Canada
- Holland Township, Michigan, USA
- Holland Charter Township, Michigan, USA
- Holland, New York, USA
- Holland, Arkansas, USA
- Holland, Ohio, USA
- Holland, Wisconsin, USA
- Holland Landing, Ontario, CAN
- Kaapsche Hoop, Mpumalanga, South Africa
- Town of Kinderhook, New York, USA
- Village of Kinderhook, New York, USA
- Kleinkrantz, Western Cape, South Africa
- Klerksdorp, North West, South Africa
- Leyden, Massachusetts, USA
- Leyden, New York, USA
- Leyden, Wisconsin, USA
- Lichtenburg, North West, South Africa
- Lincklaen, New York, USA
- Lydenburg, Mpumalanga, South Africa
- Meten-Meer-Zorg, Guyana
- Middelburg, Eastern Cape, South Africa
- Middelburg, Mpumalanga, South Africa
- Middleburgh, New York, USA
- Morgenzon, Mpumalanga, South Africa
- Muizenberg, Western Cape, South Africa
- Nassau, New York, USA
- Nederland, Colorado, USA
- New Almelo, Kansas, USA
- Nieuw Amsterdam, Suriname
- Nieuw Rotterdam, Suriname
- Nooitgedacht, Transvaal, South Africa
- Noordhoek, Western Cape, South Africa
- Oostburg, Wisconsin, USA
- Oranjestad, Aruba
- Oranjestad, Sint Eustatius
- Oudtshoorn, Western Cape, South Africa
- Overisel Township, Michigan, USA
- Paarl, Western Cape, South Africa
- Pella, Iowa, USA
- Petergof, Saint Petersburg, Russia
- Philipsburg, Sint Maarten
- Plattekill, New York, USA
- Pniel, Western Cape, South Africa
- Poestenkill, New York, USA
- Potchefstroom, North West, South Africa
- Putzonderwater, Northern Cape, South Africa
- Riebeek East, Eastern Cape, South Africa
- Riebeek-Kasteel, Western Cape, South Africa
- Riebeek West, Western Cape, South Africa
- Riviersonderend, Western Cape, South Africa
- Rheenendal, Western Cape, South Africa
- Rodebay, Western Greenland
- Rosendale, New York, USA
- Rotterdam, New York, USA
- Saugerties, New York, USA
- Simonstad, Western Cape, South Africa
- South Holland, Illinois, USA
- Stabroek, Guyana
- Stellenbosch, Western Cape, South Africa
- Struizendam, Botswana
- Stuyvesant, New York, USA
- Swellendam, Western Cape, South Africa
- Uitvlugt, Guyana
- Utrecht, KwaZulu-Natal, South Africa
- Vaalhoek, Botswana
- Valatie, New York, USA
- Vereeniging, Gauteng, South Africa
- Venlo, North Dakota, USA
- Vis Hoek, Western Cape, South Africa
- Volksrust, Mpumulanga, South Africa
- Vreed en Hoop, Guyana
- Vredenburg, Western Cape, South Africa
- Vredendal, Western Cape, South Africa
- Vryheid, KwaZulu-Natal, South Africa
- Wakkerstroom, Mpumalanga, South Africa
- Wageningen, Suriname
- Watervliet, New York, USA
- Weenen, KwaZulu-Natal, South Africa
- Wel te Vreeden, Guyana
- Weldaad, Guyana
- Wilhelmina, Missouri, USA
- Wolvengat, Western Cape, South Africa
- Wynantskill, New York, USA
- Yzerfontein, Western Cape, South Africa
- Zastron, Free State, South Africa
- Zeeburg, Guyana
- Zeehan, Tasmania, Australia
- Zeeland Charter Township, Michigan, USA
- Zeelandia, Guyana
- Zeerust, North West, South Africa
- Zuurbraak, Western Cape, South Africa
- Zwaanendael, Delaware, USA
- Zwartruggens, North West, South Africa
- Zwolle, Louisiana, USA

=== Neighbourhoods ===
- Bedford–Stuyvesant, NYC, New York, USA
- Bergen, Jersey City, New Jersey, USA
- Bergvliet, Cape Town, Western Cape, ZA
- Beverwyck, Albany, New York, USA
- Bloemendhal, Colombo, Sri Lanka
- Boerum Hill, NYC, New York, USA
- Bowery, NYC, New York, USA
- Broadway, NYC, New York, USA
- Brielle, Wall, New Jersey, USA
- The Bronx, NYC, New York, USA
- Brooklyn, NYC, New York, USA
- Bushwick, NYC, New York, USA
- Cobble Hill, NYC, New York, USA
- Constable Hook, Bayonne, New Jersey USA
- Constantia, Western Cape, South Africa
- De Waterkant, Western Cape, ZA
- De Zoete Inval, Paarl, Western Cape, ZA
- Dunderhook Paramus, New Jersey, USA
- Delft, Western province, ZA
- Dutch Kills, NYC, New York, USA
- Dutch Quarter, Colchester, Essex, England
- Dutch Quarter, Potsdam, Brandenburg, Germany
- Dyker Heights, NYC, New York, USA
- Flushing, NYC, New York, USA
- Gerritsen Beach, NYC, New York, USA
- Gowanus, NYC, New York, USA
- Gravesend, NYC, New York, USA
- Greenwich Village, NYC, New York, USA
- Harlem, NYC, New York, USA
- Hultsdorf, Colombo, Sri Lanka
- Kips Bay, NYC, New York, USA
- Kommetjie, Western Cape, ZA
- Land-en-Zeezicht, Western Cape, South Africa
- Maspeth, Queens, NYC, New York, USA
- Mauritsstad, Recife, Brazil
- Meester Cornelis, now Jatinegara district, Jakarta, ID
- Muitzes Kill, Schodack, New York, USA
- New Dorp, NYC, New York, USA
- New Utrecht, NYC, New York, USA
- Oranjezicht, Western Cape, ZA
- Paulus Hook, Jersey City, New Jersey, USA
- Prospect Lefferts Gardens, NYC, New York, USA
- Rondebosch, Western Cape, ZA
- Rotterdam, Schenectady, New York, USA
- Rozendal, Stellenbosch, Western Cape, ZA
- Ruyterwacht, Western Cape, ZA
- Spuyten Duyvil, NYC, New York, USA
- Stabroek, Georgetown, Guyana
- Stuyvesant Heights, NYC, New York, USA
- Tamboerskloof, Western Cape, ZA
- Todt Hill, NYC, New York, USA
- Twee Rivieren, George, Western Cape, ZA
- Van Cortlandt Village, NYC, New York, USA
- Van Nest, NYC, New York, USA
- Vredehoek, Cape Town, Western Cape, ZA
- Wall Street, NYC, New York, USA
- Weltevredenpark, Gauteng, ZA
- Weltevreden, now Gambir district, Jakarta, Indonesia
- Wierdapark, Gauteng, South Africa
- Wynberg, Western Cape, ZA
- Zonnebloem, Western Cape, ZA

== Other ==
=== Bays ===
- Barnegat Bay, New Jersey, USA
- Valsbaai, Western Cape, ZA
- Gansbaai, Western Cape, ZA
- Storm Bay, Tasmania, AUS
- Tafelbaai, Western Cape, ZA
- Tasman Bay, New Zealand
- Vansittart Bay, Western Australia, AUS
- Wijnkoopsbaai, now Palabuhanratu bay, West Java, ID
- Wilhelmina Bay, Antarctica

=== Beaches ===
- Wingaersheek Beach

=== Capes ===
- Cape of Good Hope, Western Cape, ZA
- Cape Henlopen, Delaware, USA
- Cape Horn, CHL
- Cape Keerweer, Queensland, AUS
- Cape Leeuwin, Western Australia, AUS
- Cape Maria van Diemen, NZ
- Cape May, New Jersey, USA
- Cape Patience, Sakhalin, RUS
- Sandy Hook, New Jersey, USA
- Sint Nicolaaspunt, now Tanjung Pujut, West Java, ID
- Verlegenhuken, Spitsbergen

=== Gulfs ===
- Frederick Henry Bay, Tasmania, AUS
- Geelvink Channel, Western Australia, AUS
- Gulf of Carpentaria, AUS
- Gulf of Patience, RUS
- Liefdefjorden, Spitsbergen
- Storm Bay, Tasmania, AUS
- Van Diemen Gulf, AUS
- Wijdefjorden, Spitsbergen

=== Lakes ===
- Beira Lake, Sri Lanka (see Sri Lankan place name etymology#Dutch)
- Harlem Meer, New York, USA

=== Mountains ===
- Bakhuis Mountains, Suriname
- Carstensz Pyramid, Papua, Indonesia
- Carstensz Glacier, Puncak Jaya, Papua, Indonesia
- Drakensberg, South Africa
- Eilerts de Haan Mountains, Suriname
- Groenland Mountains, Western Cape, South Africa
- Grootvadersbosch, South Africa
- Hottentots-Holland Mountain Range, Western Cape, South Africa
- Helderberg, South Africa
- Juliana Peak, now Puncak Mandala, Papua, Indonesia
- Julianatop, Suriname
- Kogelberg, South Africa
- Langeberg, South Africa
- Langkloof Mountains, South Africa
- Lely Mountains, Suriname
- Matroosberg, South Africa
- Mount Wilhelmina, now Puncak Trikora, Papua, Indonesia
- Riviersonderend Mountains, South Africa
- Simonsberg, South Africa
- Table Mountain (Tafelberg), South Africa
- Tygerberg, South Africa
- Van Asch Van Wijck Mountains, Suriname
- Wilhelmina Mountains, Suriname

=== Rivers ===
- Amstel River, ZA
- Berg River, ZA
- Big Timber Creek, New Jersey, USA
- Breede River, ZA
- Coen River, Queensland, AUS
- Hell Gate, New York, USA
- Holland River, Ontario, CAN
- Orange River, ZA
- South River, New York, USA
- Lorentz River, Papua, Indonesia
- Liesbeek River, ZA
- Poesten Kill, New York, USA
- Sonderend River, ZA
- Staaten River, AUS
- Swan River, Western Australia, AUS
- Schuylkill River, Pennsylvania, USA
- Staaten River, Queensland, AUS
- Tasman River, New Zealand
- Vaal River, ZA
- Wynants Kill, New York, USA

=== Seas ===
- Barents Sea, Arctic
- North Sea, Western Europe
- Tasman Sea, AUS
- Wadden Sea, Western Europe

=== Straits ===
- Arthur Kill, New York, USA
- East River, New York, USA
- Hinlopen Strait, Spitsbergen
- Le Maire Strait, Argentina
- Kattegat, Denmark
- Kill Van Kull, New York, USA
- Vries Strait, Kuril Islands, Russia/Japan

== Note ==
- Country codes used for this article
- US state codes used for this article

== See also ==
- List of place names of Dutch origin in Australia
- List of place names of Dutch origin in the United States
- Toponymy of New Netherland
- Early modern Netherlandish cartography
