= Tuschen =

- Village
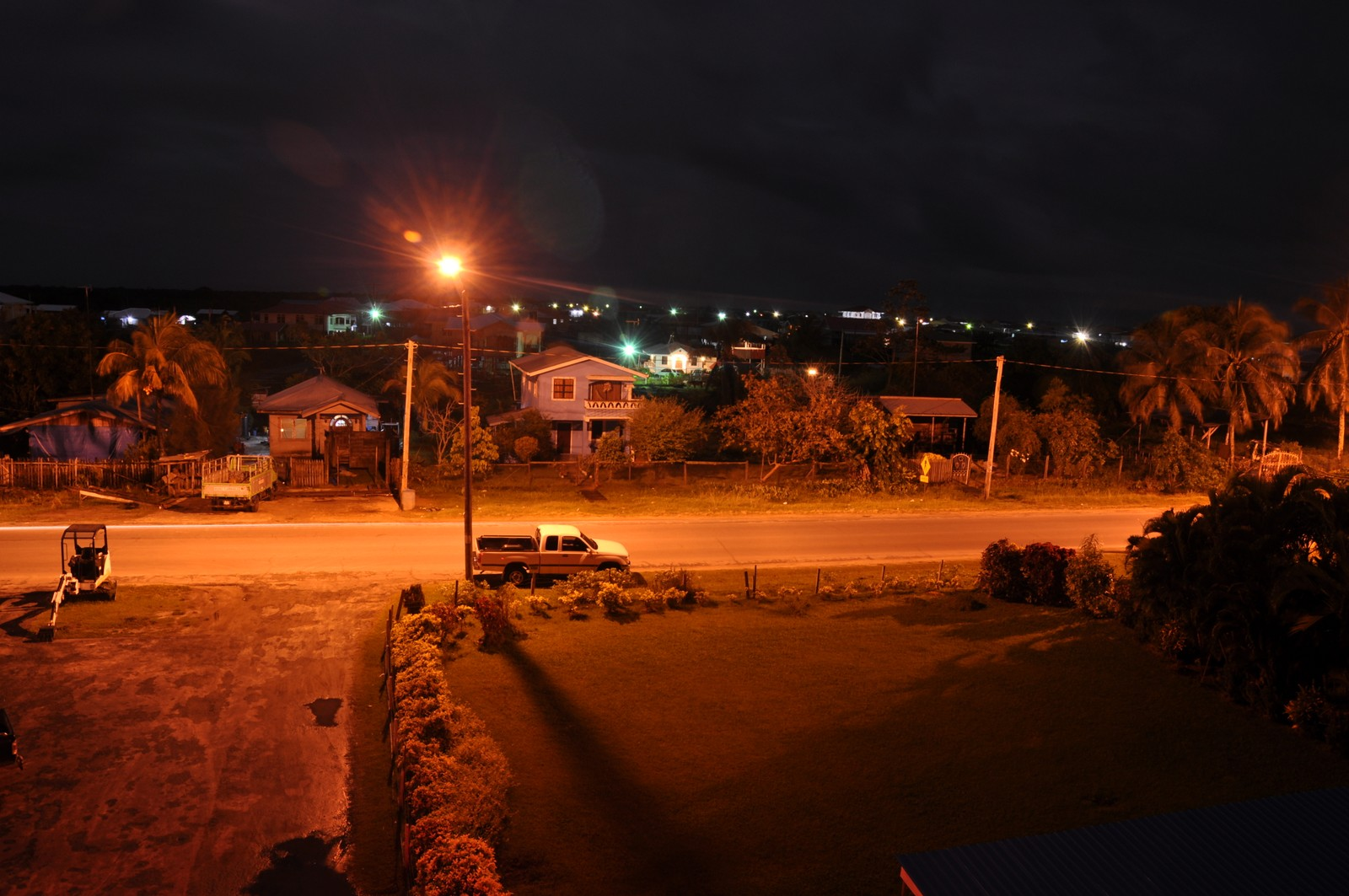
- Tuschen at night

- Location in Guyana
- Coordinates: 6.8739°N 58.3469°W
- Country: Guyana
- Region: Essequibo Islands-West Demerara
- Neighbourhood Council: Tuschen/Uitvlugt

Population (2012)
  - Total: 8,286

Tuschen is a village in the Essequibo Islands-West Demerara Region of Guyana. It is located along the Atlantic Ocean coast. The original name of the village was Tuschen de Vrienden (Dutch for between friends). During the 20th century, it was a small village. The Tuschen Housing Scheme resulted in a considerable growth, and is one of the largest housing schemes in Guyana.

== Overview ==
The village started as sugar plantation Tuschen de Vrienden, and developed into a small rural community. In 1890, a railway station was opened in Tuschen on the Demerara-Essequibo railway. The line operated until 1974.

In the early 21st century, the Tuschen Housing Scheme was developed to transform the abandoned sugar estates into housing. Phase one centred around the original village, and phase two extends from the public road to the savannah.

The village has a primary and secondary school, health centre, many shops and businesses. Tuschen is planned to be in a Neighbourhood Council (municipality) together with the neighbouring Met-en-Meerzorg and Uitvlugt. However, as of April 2021, that body has not been established yet, and the villagers have set up a Community Development Council to govern the community.

== Notable people ==
- Kevon Boodie (born 1993), cricketer.
