= Stewartville, Guyana =

Stewartville
- Village
- Location within Guyana
- Coordinates: 6.871573°N 58.296572°W
- Country: Guyana
- Region: Essequibo Islands-West Demerara

Population (2012)
  - Total: 2,808
- Time zone: UTC-04:00 (GYT)

Stewartville is a village district in Guyana on the Atlantic coast of West Demerara, just east of the mouth of the Essequibo River. There are four sections in the village: Stewartville Housing Scheme, Sarah Lodge, Stewartville Old Road and Stewartville Sea View.

== Community ==
Stewartville is about 10 miles (16 km) west of Vreed en Hoop, and is separated from the neighbouring community of Leonora by a trench. The community of Uitvlugt is immediately to its west. The village is populated by various ethnic groups.

Stewartville is named after the Stewart family who owned the plantation. John Stewart Jr. was the illegitimate son of John Stewart Sr. In 1826, John Steward Sr. died. In his will, he named John Steward Jr. as his natural son and awarded him the plantations of Stewartville and Annandale. John Stewart Jr. was probably of mixed race, and was elected Member of Parliament in 1832. Despite his background, he was a strong proponent of slavery.

With the abolition of slavery throughout the British Empire in 1834, freedmen began making group and individual purchase of land in the village. By the 1860s many Africans had settled in the Creole village of Stewartville and were working on the West Coast Demerara estates. There is a record of four Sierre Leonians in 1874 petitioning from Stewartville for a grant of crown land to cultivate rice on Hog Island, Essequibo.

Later, estate workers originally from South India came to the coast and introduced their own traditions. The Indians mostly settled in areas between the Afro-Guyanese villages. A mosque was built in Stewartville around 1911. At times, in the 1970s, there were violent clashes between the ethnic groups. As of 2012 the village had a population of 2,808.

== Climate ==
Temperature is fairly steady throughout the year at between 25 °C (77 °F) and 27 °C (81 °F). There are two wet seasons in May–July and in December–January. Average monthly rainfall ranges from 104 millimetres (4.1 in) in September to 383 millimetres (15.1 in) in June, with about 2,670 millimetres (105 in) annually.

== Infrastructure ==
Stewartville has a secondary school, serving other communities in the region. The Unserved Areas Electricity Programme brought electricity to the community in 2005-2006. The school road at Stewartville was rehabilitated in 2009, but the job was done by an inexperienced contractor and was poor quality. In less than six months, potholes were starting to appear. In August 2011 it was announced that funding was being provided to upgrade roads in the area, including regarding the roads, road sides and drains, with 32,000 people expected to benefit directly. In February 2012 residents of Sarah Lodge were complaining that road works had started two months before and then stalled, and the unfinished construction was blocking the main road and causing serious flooding.

Erosion of the shore has long been a problem. In 1918 it was reported that repairs to the sea wall were needed. Excessively high tides on 16–17 October 2005 caused breaches of the sea defenses on West Coast Demerara. In November the government announced it had approved contracts for emergency repairs. $102M was to be spent on obtaining and laying boulders along the sea defense line at Stewartville and Leonora. The work was being funded from a 38.9 Euro grant agreement under the Eighth European Development Fund. In December 2009 a high spring tide caused waves that over-topped the sea wall and flooded several yards in Stewartville Sea View. No drainage system had been installed since the 2006 flooding. The wall was damaged near to the point where the flooding occurred.

In October 2010 the contractor working on a project to repair the sea defenses recommended using riprap construction as an alternative to building wave walls. With riprap construction, loose boulders absorb the force of the waves. Unlike wave walls, which tend to be undermined, crack and require expensive repair, riprap defenses need little maintenance. However, they are slightly more expensive to build. In October 2011 it was announced that the EU-funded program to reconstruct or rehabilitate about 20 kilometres (12 mi) of sea defenses would not be completed by its month-end deadline. A new date of February 2012 was proposed. The contractor had run into difficulties that included design changes, heavy rains and delays in accessing duty-free materials.

== Other events ==
During the 2006 general elections the PPP/C held a "Grand Victory Rally" at Stewartville before the election was held. Speaking at the rally to an audience made up mostly of sugar workers and rice farmers, President Bharrat Jagdeo outlined a $500B development plan for the next five years. The PPP/C held another massive rally at Stewartville in November 2011 during the Guyanese general election, 2011. President Bharrat Jagdeo again spoke at the event.

In October 2010 a boat carrying drinks and other products from the Banks DIH company to the Essequibo Coast developed leaks and had to be grounded on the Stewartville foreshore. Mud had got into the pump, which would not start, and the engine room flooded. After the tide receded, the boat leaned to one side. Some boxes fell off and were taken away by Stewartville residents. That night, dozens of people climbed onto the boat, taking soft drinks and alcoholic drinks, as well as other products such as biscuits and bottled water. The looting was thorough, including draining the fuel from the boat's tanks. Some started drinking while they were looting. One man, apparently drunk, fell into the water and drowned between the boat and the sea wall.

== Notable people ==
Allan Carlyle Miller was born in Stewartville Village on 19 September 1898. After training in the southern United States as a doctor and a Baptist minister, he returned to Guyana and established the Guyana Missionary Baptist Church Lott-Carey. The well-known artist Donald Locke was born here in 1930. Locke started to study painting under E. R. Burrowes in the Working People's Art Class in Georgetown in 1947. In 1979 he moved to the United States, dying in Atlanta Georgia in December 2010. In 1973, Stewartville was home to Diana Amelia Barrow, who was 107 years old. She was the mother of six children, two of whom had died, and had 23 grandchildren.
