= Leguan Island =

Island in Guyana

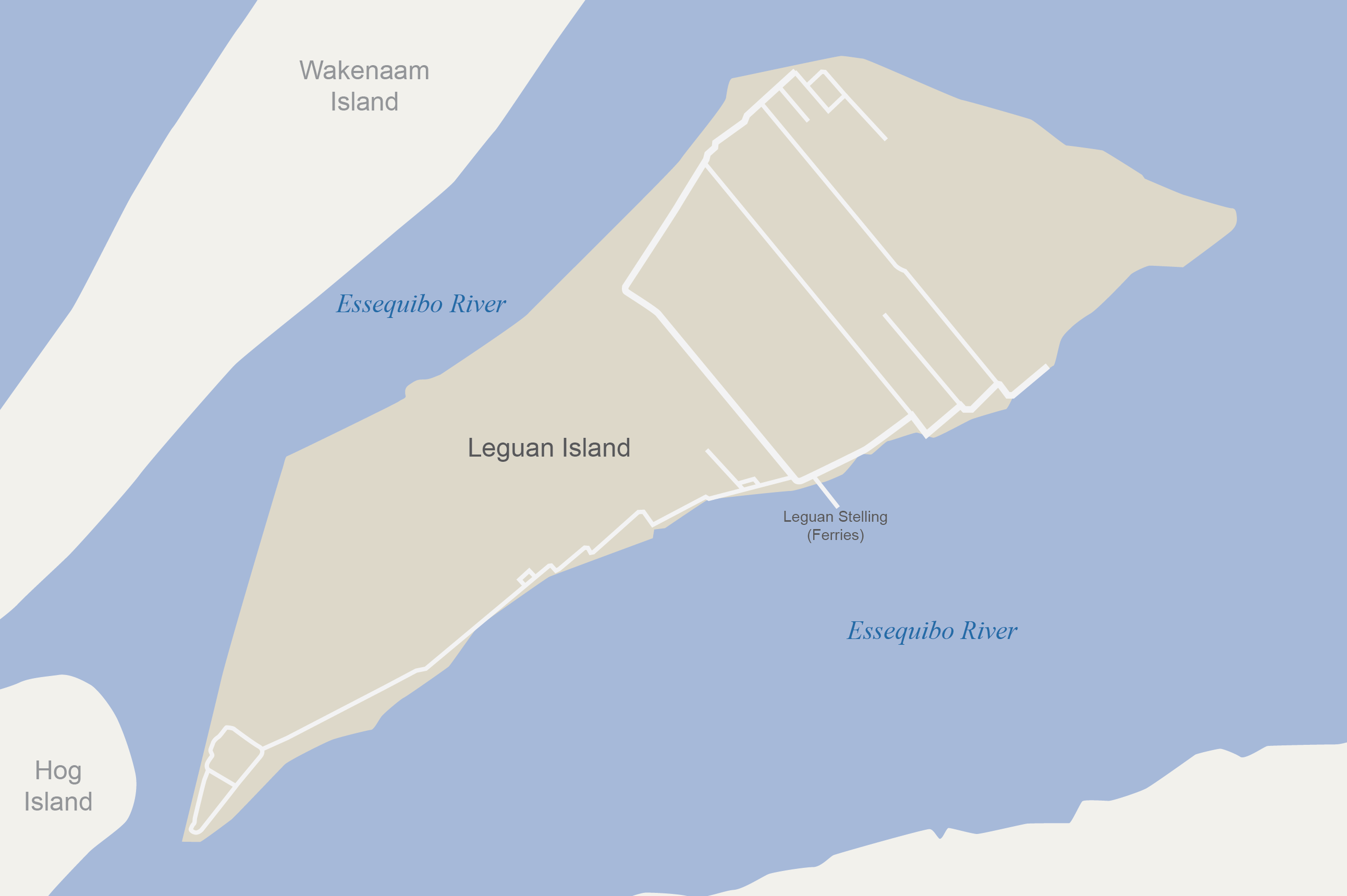
- Interactive map of Leguan Island

Geography
- Location: Essequibo River
- Coordinates: 6°55′N 58°25′W
- Archipelago: Essequibo Islands
- Area: 12 sq mi (31 km^{2})

Administration
- Guyana
- Essequibo Islands-West Demerara

Demographics
- Population: 2,500

Leguan Island is a small island situated in the delta of the Essequibo River on the coast of Guyana, South America. The island is shaped like a gull wing and is nine miles (14 km) long and 2 miles (3.2 km) wide at its widest, making it roughly 12 square miles (31 km^{2}) in area. When settlers first arrived on the island, they found many iguanas, hence the name Leguan Island. (Leguaan is the Dutch word for iguana.)

== Demographics ==
Leguan has an estimated population of 2,500 as of 2018, living in 36 demarcated villages. Settlements include Maryville, Le Bagatelle, Richmond Hill and Uniform. Villages are supported by the Leguan Neighbourhood Democratic Council.

The population has declined fairly rapidly during the past decade, as residents leave to settle in more urban parts of Guyana or migrate, often to the United States, Canada, the United Kingdom, or to various Caribbean islands. Leguan is primarily a rice-farming and cattle-rearing community, with roughly 3,000 acres devoted toward rice cultivation, 3,000 for cash crops, and another 2,500 for cattle. Other occupations on the island include government administration, teaching, health care and policing.

Leguan is of roughly 82% East Indian ancestry and 17% African ancestry. The remaining approximately 1% of the population are foreign-born Chinese, Canadian, American and English, most of whom are involved in community development work with religious or state organizations. A majority of Leguan residents are Hindu. The minority variously follow Islam, Christianity and the Rastafari movement. Leguan is situated in the Essequibo River, next to another island named Wakenaam. There are six rice factories located on the island, the largest being Mustapha Pasha Rice Milling Enterprise, Baseeran Pasha Rice Milling Enterprise, Chand's Rice Milling Enterprise, RN Persaud & Company Ltd and the Ojha's. The primary mode of transportation on Leguan is by bicycle. Many people also have motorbikes, and a small group of people have cars. There is some taxi service but no bus.

== Infrastructure ==
The island is home to the regional government office for the Essequibo Islands. The regional office serves the other populated islands of the Essequibo River delta, Wakenaam Island and Hogg Island. Leguan has five elementary schools and one secondary school. The secondary school currently serves about 300 students in grades seven through eleven, or forms one through five.

Leguan is served by the Guyana Department of Transport and Harbours with two daily round-trips to and from Parika with large engine vessels. However, as of 2020 the number of trips has been reduced due to COVID-19. Many Leguan residents travel to shop at the Thursday and Sunday open-air markets in Parika. Independent speed boat taxis also service the island regularly from the Parika stelling (landing). Leguan only received electricity services, from Guyana Power & Light company, in 1997; and telephone services, both land-line and cellular, from Guyana Telephone & Telegraph in 1999. The island has three main paved roads, two running along the north and south coasts and a road that bisects the island, connecting the coastal roads. The government of Guyana built a brukup stelling on the island in 2005.
