= Fort Island, Guyana =

Fort Island
- River island
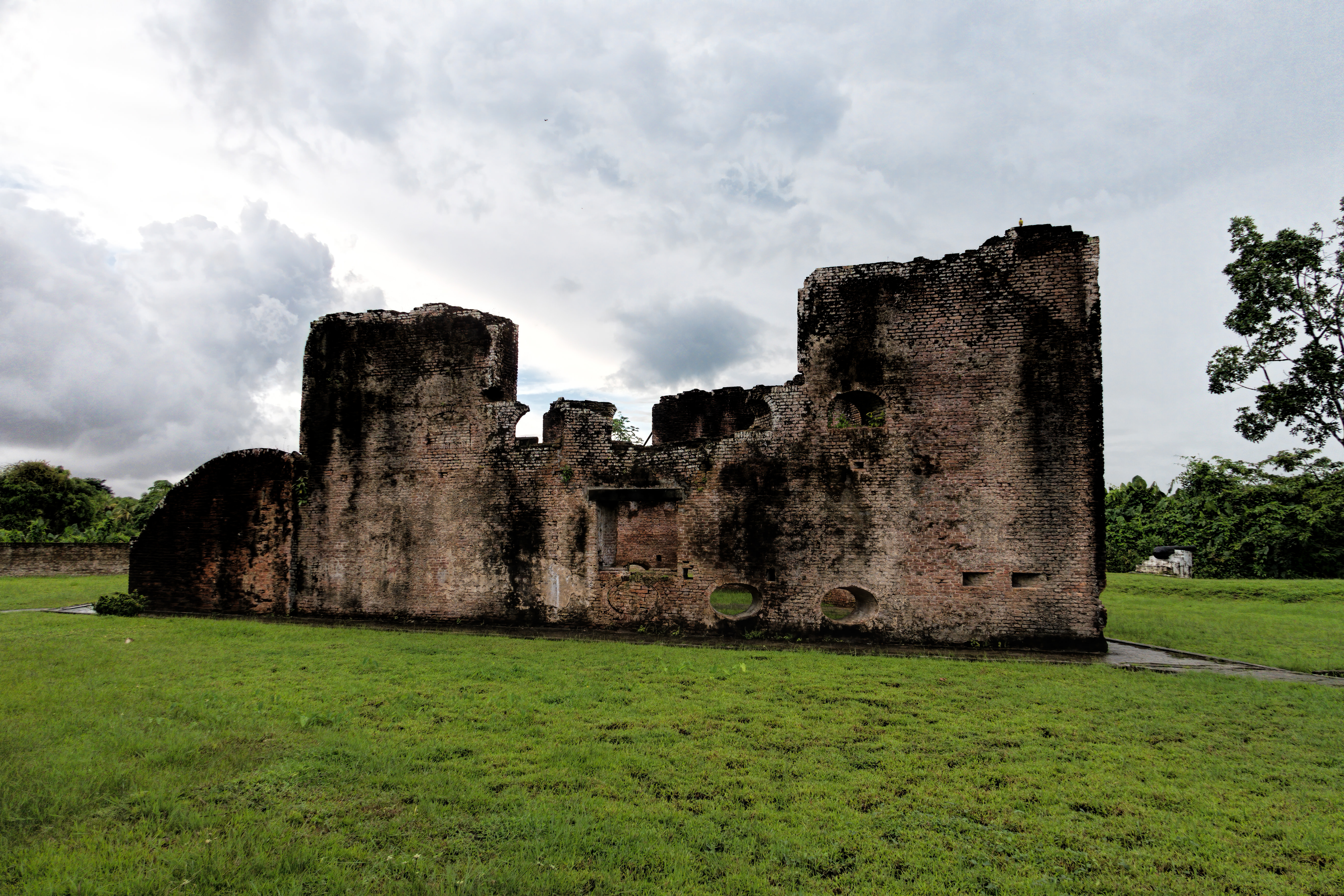
- Ruins of Fort Zeelandia

- Location in Guyana
- Coordinates: 6.7821°N 58.5105°W
- Country: Guyana
- Region: Essequibo Islands-West Demerara

Population (2021)
  - Total: 95
- Time zone: UTC-4
- Climate: Af

Fort Island is an island in the Essequibo River located in the Essequibo Islands-West Demerara region of Guyana. It is about 16 kilometres (10 mi) from the mouth of the river, and to the east of Hogg Island. In 1687, a wooden fort was built on the island. In 1744, Fort Zeelandia was constructed and served as the capital of Essequibo, a Dutch colony which is nowadays part of Guyana. In 1752, the Court of Policy was built on the island as the legislative body for the colony.

== History ==
In 1679, Abraham Beekman, the Dutch Governor of the Essequibo colony, ordered the construction of a wooden fort on the island. At the time, the island was called Flag Island. The capital of the colony was located at Fort Kyk-Over-Al. Laurens Storm van 's Gravesande became Governor of Essequibo in 1743, and ordered the construction of Fort Zeelandia, a brick fort, on the island. The fort was finished in 1744. The fort suffered severe damage during the Fourth Anglo-Dutch War.

In 1752, the Court of Policy was built on the island which served as the legislative body for the colony. The Court of Policy is the oldest extant non-military building of Guyana. In 2007, the Dutch Heritage Museum opened in the building. Fort Zeelandia and the Court of Policy were declared a national monument in 1999 and are maintained by the National Trust of Guyana, and are on the UNESCO World Heritage Site tentative list.

== Current situation ==
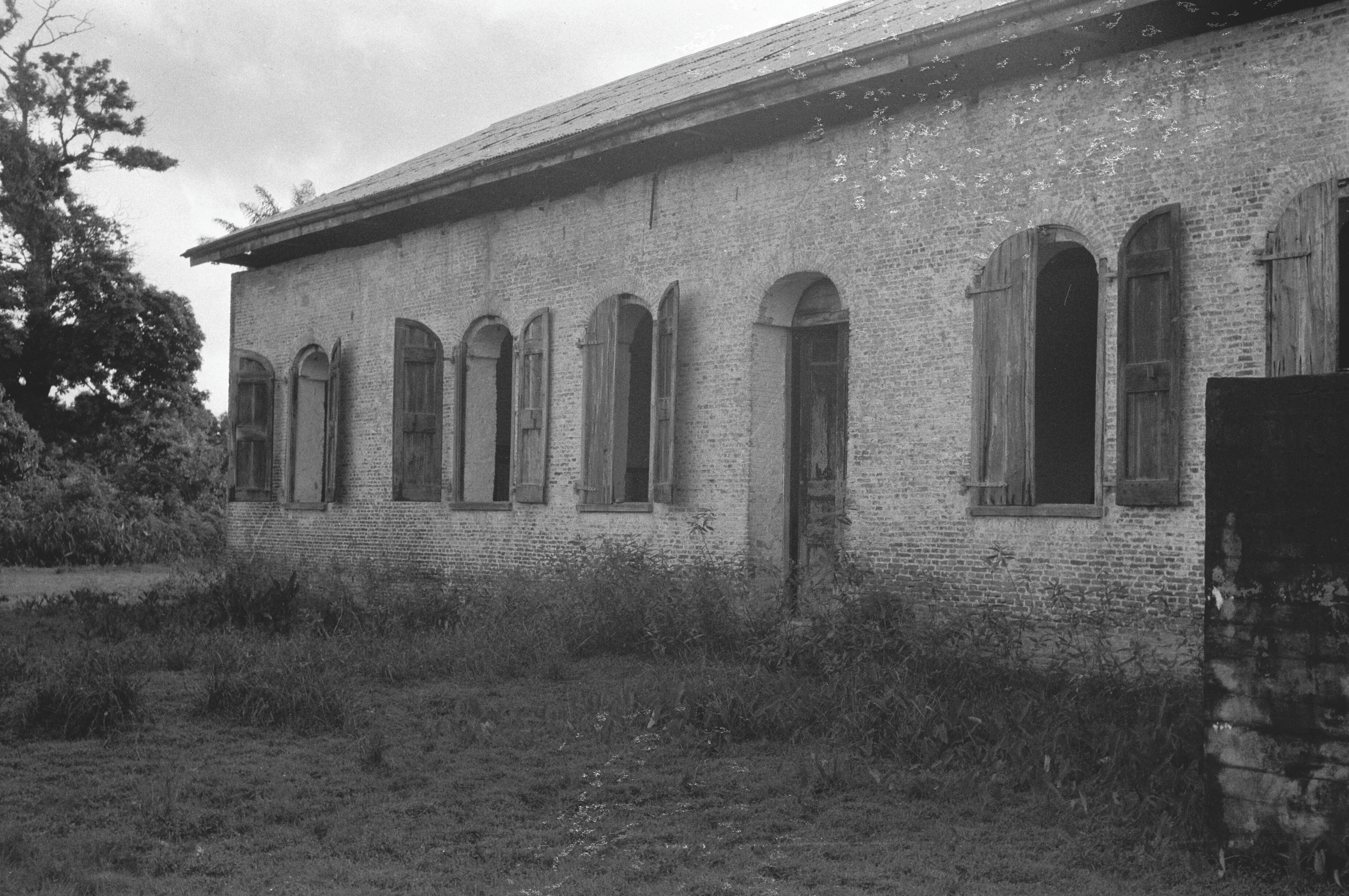
Church on Fort Island (1979)

The island is inhabited, and was home to 95 people as of 2021. The economy is mainly based on agriculture and fishing. The island has a health centre, but no school. The church on the island has been abandoned.

The ferry from Parika to Bartica makes a stop at Fort Island. In 2021, construction started on a stelling (small harbour) on the island, to improve the access to the island, and encourage tourism.
