= Fort Zeelandia =

Fort Zeelandia may refer to the following Dutch forts :

- Fort Zeelandia (Taiwan), a fort in Tainan, Taiwan
  - Siege of Fort Zeelandia, 1661–1662
- Fort Zeelandia (Paramaribo), in Suriname, originally built by the English and called Fort Willoughby
- Fort Zeelandia (Guyana)
- Fort Zeelandia (Benin), on the Dutch Slave Coast
