= Vriesland =

Vriesland may refer to:

== People ==
- Victor E. van Vriesland (1892–1974), Dutch writer

== Places ==
=== Guyana ===
- Vriesland, Guyana, a village in Guyana

=== Netherlands ===
- Friesland, an old spelling of the Dutch province.

=== United States ===
- Vriesland, Michigan, a community in Michigan
