= Fort Island =

Fort Island may refer to:

- Fort Delaware State Park, a river island in Delaware.
- Fort Island Gulf Beach near Crystal River, Florida
- St Michael's Isle, an island which is part of the Isle of Man.
- Fort Island, Guyana, a river island in Guyana.
