= Goed Fortuin =

- Location within Guyana
- Coordinates: 6.7844°N 58.1954°W
- Country: Guyana
- Region: Essequibo Islands-West Demerara

Population (2012)
  - Total: 2,644

Goed Fortuin is a village located in the Essequibo Islands-West Demerara region of Guyana. The village started as a sugar plantation in the early 1800s.

The village has a primary and secondary school.

Goed Fortuin was named "Best Community for Sports" by the National Sports Commission in 2011. Some local teams include the Goed Fortuin Beavers, West Demerara Football Association (WDFA) senior league and the Goed Fortuin Young Achievers, volleyball.
