= Vriesland, Guyana =

Vriesland
- Village
- Location in Guyana
- Coordinates: 6.6888°N 58.1976°W
- Country: Guyana
- Region: Essequibo Islands-West Demerara
- Neighbourhood Council: Amsterdam/Vriesland

Population (2012)
  - Total: 530

Vriesland is a village in the Essequibo Islands-West Demerara Region of Guyana. It is located on the west bank of the Demerara River.

== Overview ==
Vriesland started as a sugar plantation in Demerara. In 1832, a total of 255 slaves was recorded. The name is related to the Dutch province of Friesland, however the exact origin is unknown.

Vriesland is bordered by a koker (canal). The Wales Sugar Estate used to own 16,000 acres (6,500 ha) of sugar cane fields along the koker, and was a major employer. In 2016, Guyana Sugar Corporation, the owner, closed Wales Sugar Estate, and the estate was divided into small lots to be sold as farmland.

The economy is based on farming, fishing and shop keeping. The health centre is in neighbouring Viva-La-Force while the secondary school is in Patentia. Vriesland has access to water, electricity and telecommunications.

In 2021, ExxonMobil announced plans to construct a natural gas processing plant near Vriesland.
