= Uitvlugt =

- Village
- Location within Guyana
- Coordinates: 6.874194°N 58.302304°W
- Country: Guyana
- Region: Essequibo Islands-West Demerara

Population (2012)
  - Total: 2,980
- Time zone: UTC−04:00

Uitvlugt (pronounced "owt-flut") is a village in the Essequibo Islands-West Demerara region of Guyana. On the coastal public road on the west bank of the Demerara River, it lies immediately to the west of Stewartville and to the south of Zeeburg, about 20 minutes by road from Vreed-en-Hoop.

The name is Dutch and translates to excuse/pretext, but in this case, it was the surname of Ignatius Uitvlugt, who owned an enormous sugar plantation. The plantation continued as a sugar estate and merged with the neighbouring Leonora estate in 1981. In 1871, the village became known for the sugar factory that is now owned by the Guyana Sugar Corporation. The sugar factory supplied its sugar via a pipeline to the nearby rum distillery. The rum distillery closed in 1999.

As of 2012 the population was 2,980 people from a variety of ethnic backgrounds. Unusually for the region, the village has seven churches.

== See also ==
- Harischandra Khemraj
