= Noitgedacht =

- Village
- Location in Guyana
- Coordinates: 6°56′N 58°27′W
- Country: Guyana
- Region: Essequibo Islands-West Demerara

Population (2017)
  - Total: 120
- Time zone: UTC-4
- Climate: Af

Noitgedacht also Nooitgedacht (Dutch for 'Never Thought') is one of the villages on the island of Wakenaam, Guyana. It is populated mainly by small-scale farmers. The main access to this section of the island is by ferry/speedboat from the Essequibo coast.

Another village called Noitgedacht is situated in Upper Demerara, in the Town of Linden. It was once owned by the Dutch family De Nieuwerks, later by the family Allicocks and eventually it became property of Alcan of Canada.
