= Leonora, Guyana =

Leonora
- Village
- Location in Guyana
- Coordinates: 6.87194°N 58.28904°W
- Country: Guyana
- Region: Essequibo Islands-West Demerara

Population (2012)
  - Total: 1,555
- Time zone: UTC-4
- Climate: Af

Leonora is a village in Essequibo Islands-West Demerara (Region 3), one of Guyana's 10 regions. Its subdivisions are Pasture, Sea Field, Para Field, Groenveldt and Sea Spray. The neighboring villages are Anna Catherina and Uitvlugt. Leonora encompasses an area of about 13 square kilometres (5 sq mi), once part of the Parish of St. Luke. It stretches from Edinburgh in the east to Stewartville in the west, and from the Atlantic Ocean in the north, to the south as far as the West Demerara Water Conservancy.

Leonora was named after the historical 7,942 acre Leonora sugar plantation, which operated from before 1789 until the Leonora Estate sugar factory was closed down in December 1986. The plantation was named after the two children of the owner: Leo and Nora.

Leonora is home to the Synthetic Track and Field Facility, a multi-sport stadium seating 3,000 people. The sport stadium was opened in 2005.

== Notable people ==
- Irfaan Ali (1980), President of Guyana
