= Parika =

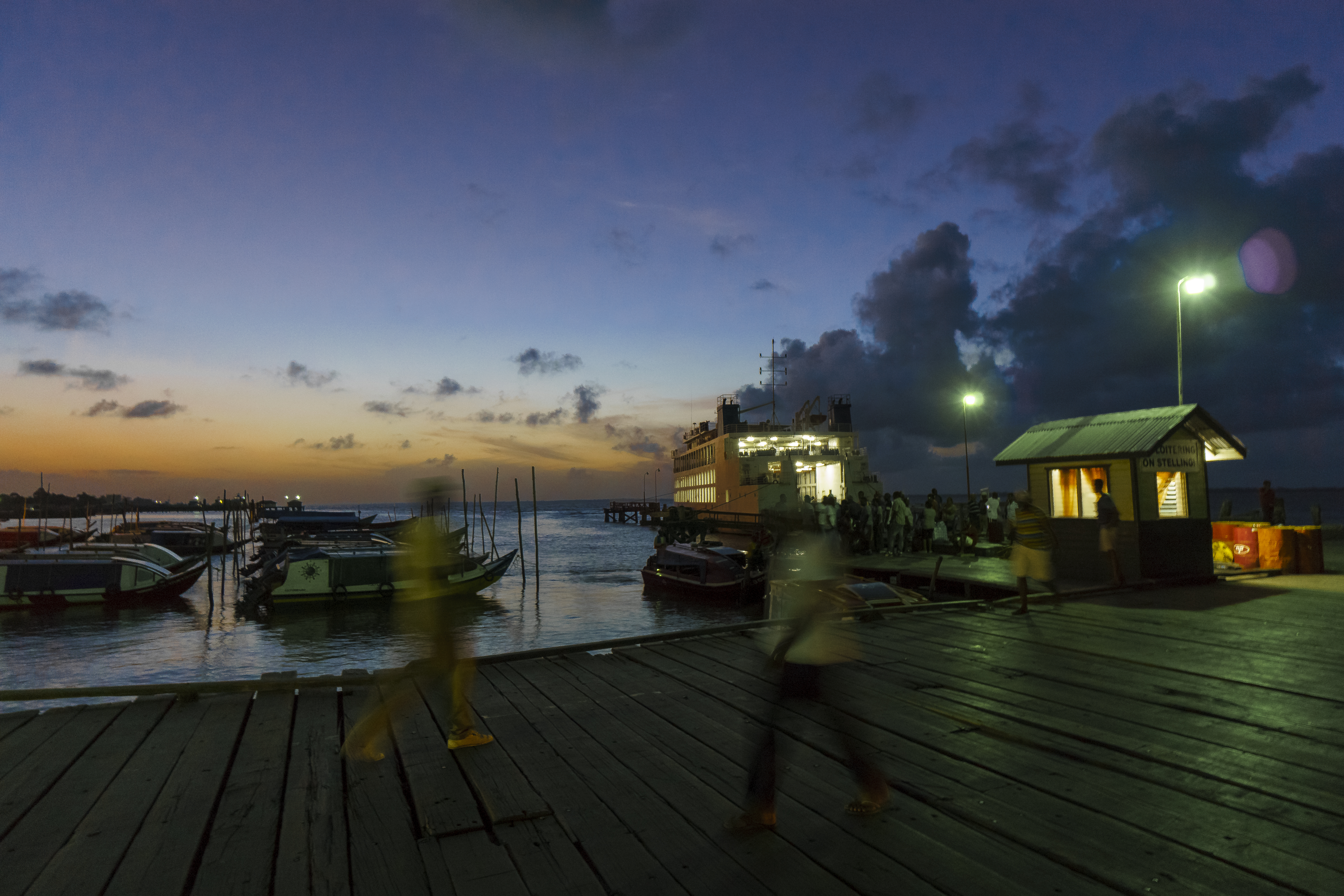
- Parika Stelling (Harbour) with a ferry in the background

- Location in Guyana
- Coordinates: 6.8588°N 58.4252°W
- Country: Guyana
- Region: Essequibo Islands-West Demerara

Population (2012)
  - Total: 4,385

Parika is a port village located in the Essequibo Islands-West Demerara region of Guyana. Its ferry service is operated by the Ministry of Transportation, to and from the Essequibo Islands and West Demerara area. It is a hub for land transport, since it is a route stop for local taxis commonly called "buses."

== Overview ==
Parika is the end of the main road from Georgetown. In 2020, work started to upgrade the road from Demerara Harbour Bridge to Parika to a 2x2 lane dual carriageway.

Parika itself is a small town, however as a gateway to the western half of Guyana, it is always busy. It is best known for its market. Over 700 merchants own a stall on the market. Sunday is traditionally the busiest day of the week. Parika is home to a police station, post office, multiple hotels and a variety of restaurants.

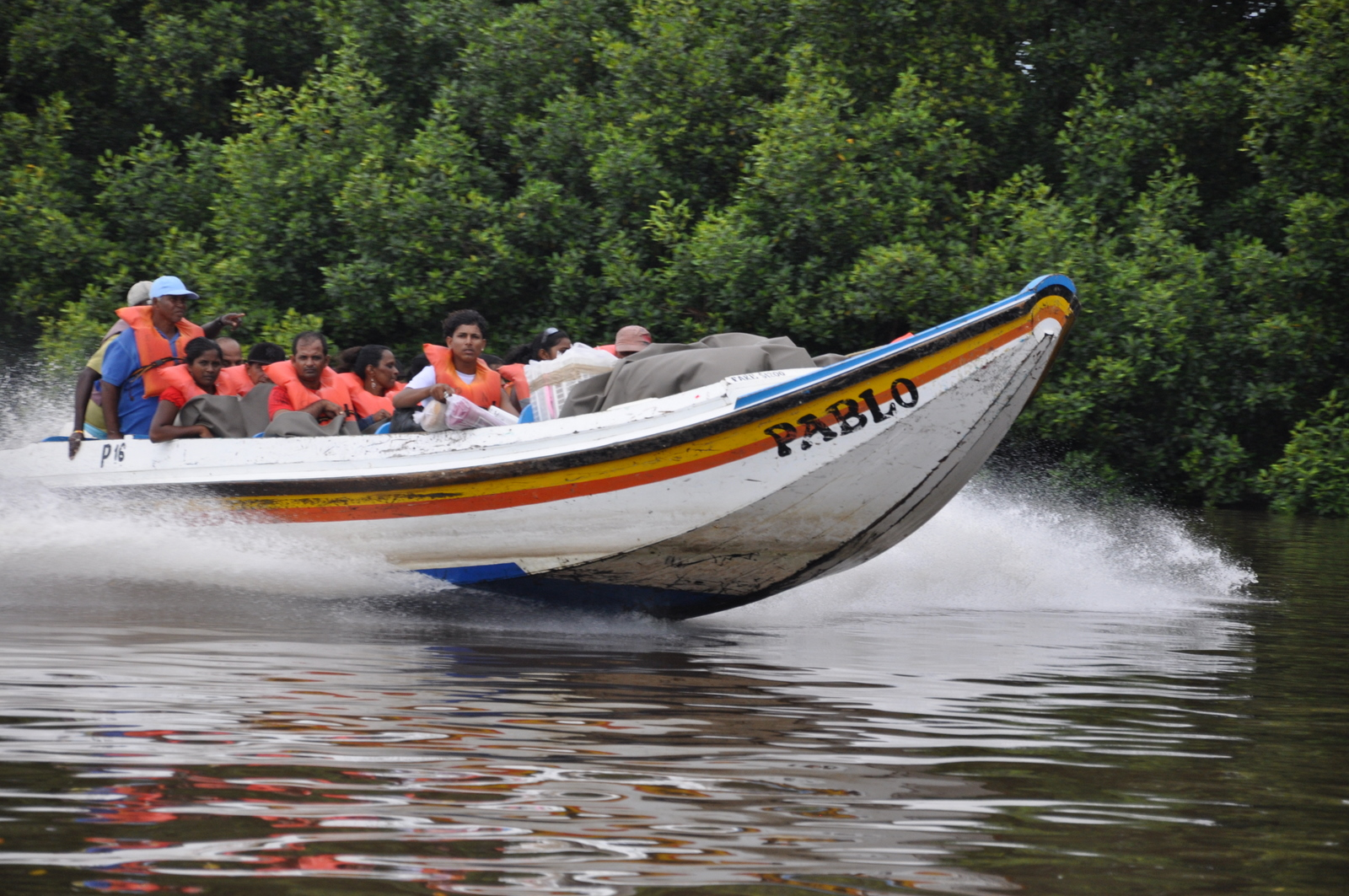
Speed boat to Supenaam

Ferry services are offered to Bartica, Leguan Island, Wakenaam and Supenaam. The ferry to Bartica makes a stop at Fort Island. Cars need to be booked at least two hours in advance, and are not guaranteed a spot.
