= Neighbourhood Councils of Guyana =

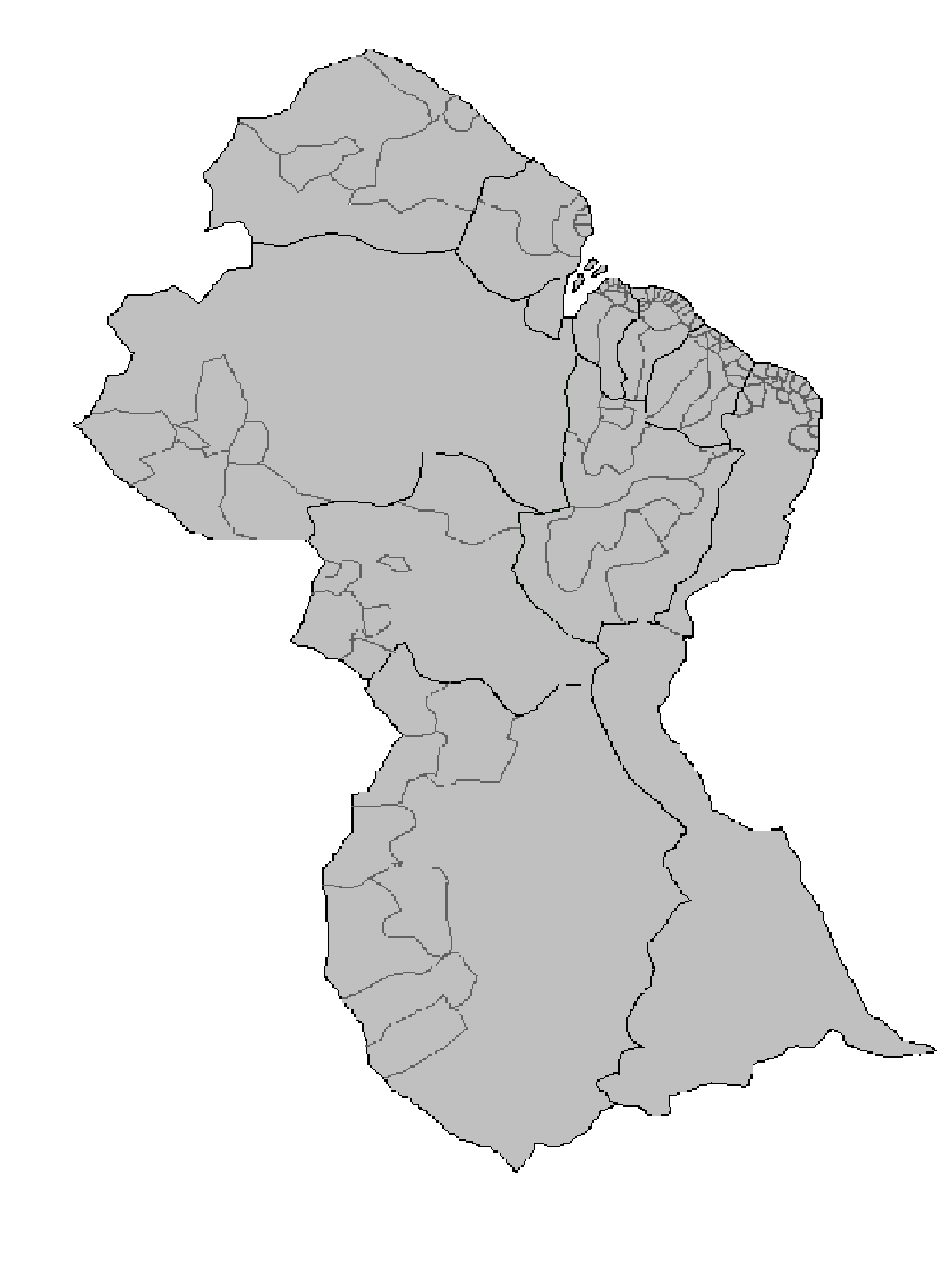
The districts of Guyana

The regions of Guyana are divided into three types of councils: municipal or town councils, neighbourhood democratic councils and Amerindian villages.

The ten towns of Guyana are:

- Anna Regina
- Bartica
- Corriverton
- Georgetown
- Lethem
- Linden
- Mabaruma
- Mahdia
- New Amsterdam
- Rose Hall

The neighbourhood democratic councils are listed below by region:

== Barima-Waini (Region 1) ==
- Ridge/Arakaka
- Mabaruma/Kumaka/Hosororo

== Pomeroon-Supenaam (Region 2) ==
- Charity/Urasara
- Evergreen/Paradise
- Aberdeen/Zorg-en-Vlygt
- Annandale/Riverstown
- Good Hope/Pomona

== Essequibo Islands-West Demerara (Region 3) ==
- Wakenaam
- Leguan
- Mora/Parika
- Hydronie/Good Hope
- Greenwich Park, Vergenoegen
- Tuschen/Uitvlugt
- Stewartville/Cornelia Ida
- Hague/Blankenburg
- La Jalousie/Nouvelle Flanders
- Best/Klien/Pouderoyen
- Malgre Tout/Meer Zorgen
- La Grange/Nimes
- Canal's Polder
- Toevlugt/Patentia

== Demerara-Mahaica (Region 4) ==
- Soesdyke/Huis't Coverden NDC
- Lamaha/Yarrowkabra NDC
- Caledonia/Good Success
- Little Diamond/Herstelling
- Golden Grove/Diamond Place
- Mocha/Arcadia
- Ramsburg/Eccles
- Industry/Plaisance
- Better Hope/LBI
- Beterverwagting/Triumph
- Mon Repos/La Reconnaissance
- Buxton/Foulis
- Enmore/Hope
- Haslington/Grove
- Unity/Vereeniging
- Cane Grove

== Mahaica-Berbice (Region 5) ==
- Woodlands/Farm
- Hamlet/Chance
- Mahaicony/Abary
- Profit/Rising Sun
- Seafield/Tempie
- Union/Naarstigheid
- Bath/Woodley Park
- Woodlands/Bel Air
- Zeelugt/Rosignol
- Blairmont/Gelderland

== East Berbice-Corentyne (Region 6) ==
- Enfield/New Doe Park
- Ordinance/FortLands
- Canefield/Enterprise
- Kintyre/No.37
- Gibraltar/Fyrish
- Kilcoy/Hampshire
- Port Mourant/John
- Bloomfield/Whim
- Lancaster/Hogstye
- Black Bush Polder
- Good Hope/No.51
- Macedonia/Joppa
- Bushlot/Adventure
- Maida/Tarlogie
- No. 52/ No. 74
- Crabwood Creek/Molsen Creek

== Cuyuni-Mazaruni (Region 7) ==
- Bartica NDC

== Potaro-Siparuni (Region 8) ==
No subdivisions. Governed from the regional capital Mahdia

== Upper Takutu-Upper Essequibo (Region 9) ==
- ~~Ireng/Sawariwau NDC~~ Dissolved in 2012.

== Upper Demerara-Berbice (Region 10) ==
- Kwakwani NDC

== See also ==
- Indigenous villages in Guyana
- Regions of Guyana
