= Wakenaam =

Island in Guyana

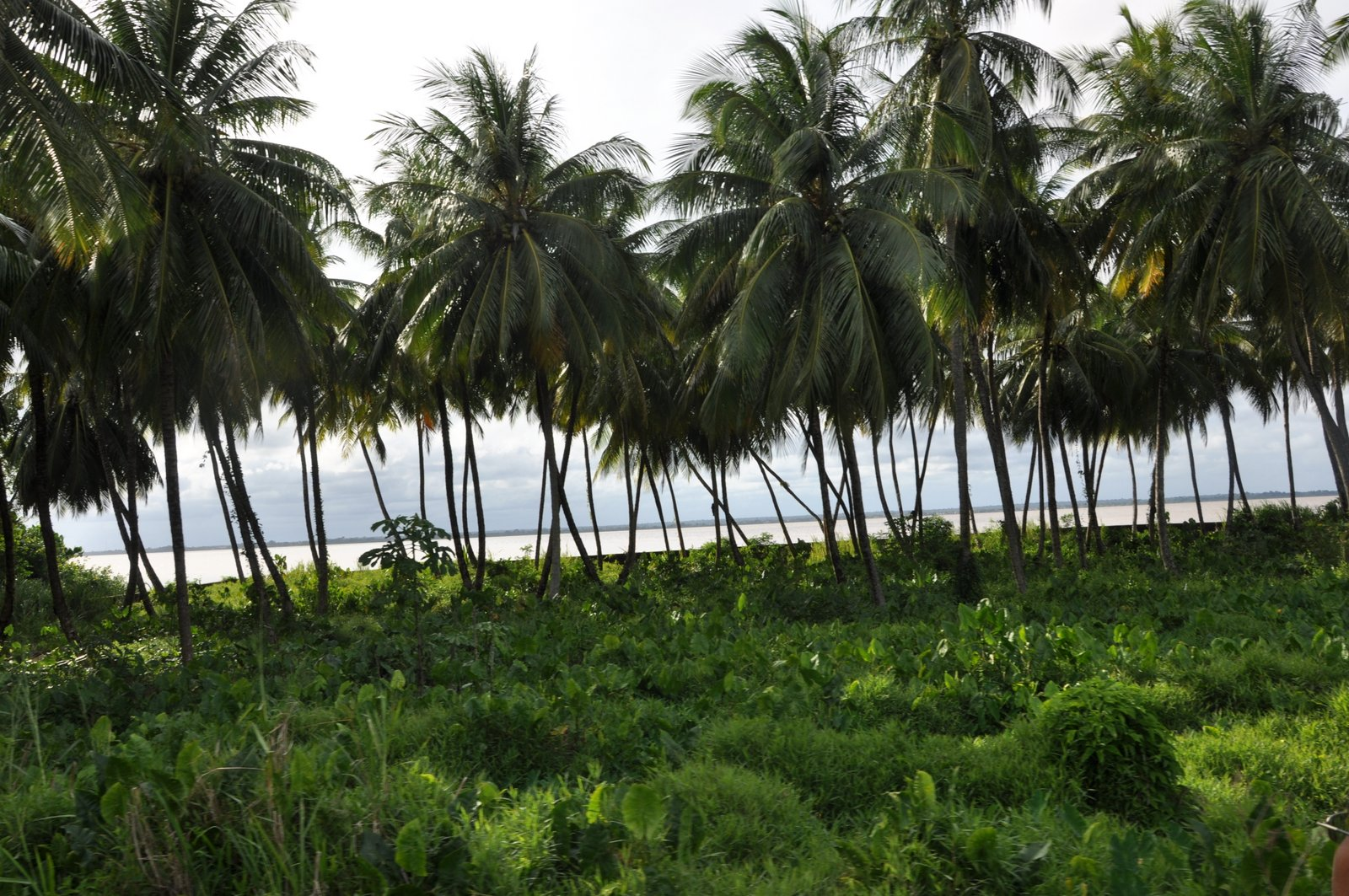
- Interactive map of Wakenaam

Geography
- Location: Essequibo River
- Coordinates: 6.97005°N 58.45001°W
- Archipelago: Essequibo Islands
- Area: 17.5 sq mi (45 km^{2})

Administration
- Guyana
- Essequibo Islands-West Demerara

Demographics
- Population: 4,000

Wakenaam is an island of about 17.5 square miles (45 km^{2}) at the mouth of the Essequibo River of Guyana. One of the largest islands (the others being Leguan and Hogg Island) in the Essequibo Islands group, it was settled at one time by the Dutch in the 18th century. The name Wakenaam is Dutch meaning "waiting for a name" and the island still contains old Dutch graves at various locations. The island, like most other islands in the Essequibo River in Guyana, is characterized by green vegetation, blue skies and cool breeze from the Atlantic. Wakenaam has multiple villages which include Maria's Pleasure, Good Success, Sans Souci, Melville, Belle Plaine, Sarah, Zeelandia, Friendship, Bank Hall, Meer Zorg, Caledonia, Free and Easy, Arthurville, Palmyra, Maria Johanna, Dumburg, Fredericksburg, Noitgedacht, Rush Brook and Ridge.

== Population ==
The island has a population of approximately 4,000 people as of 2016, consisting mainly of people of Indian and African descent, with smaller percentages of the descendants of other races.

== Economy ==
The economy of Wakenaam is based on agriculture. Farming is the main occupation. Farmers grow rice, coconut and various vegetables and roots. Its inhabitants also raise cattle both for milk and for meat and engage in fishing, though this is done on a small, private scale.

== Notable people ==
- Ramnaresh Sarwan (1980), West Indies cricket batsman

== Gallery ==
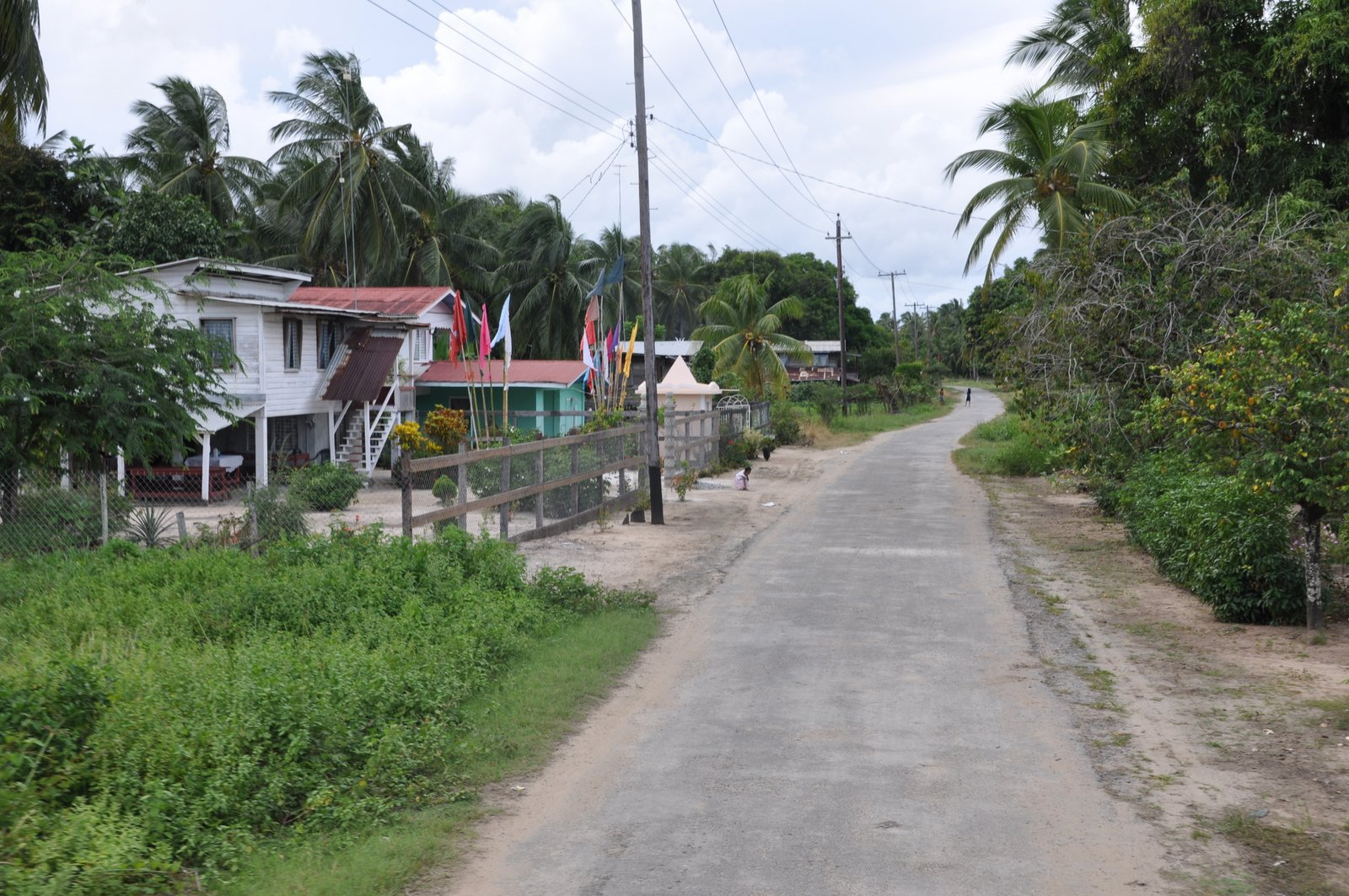

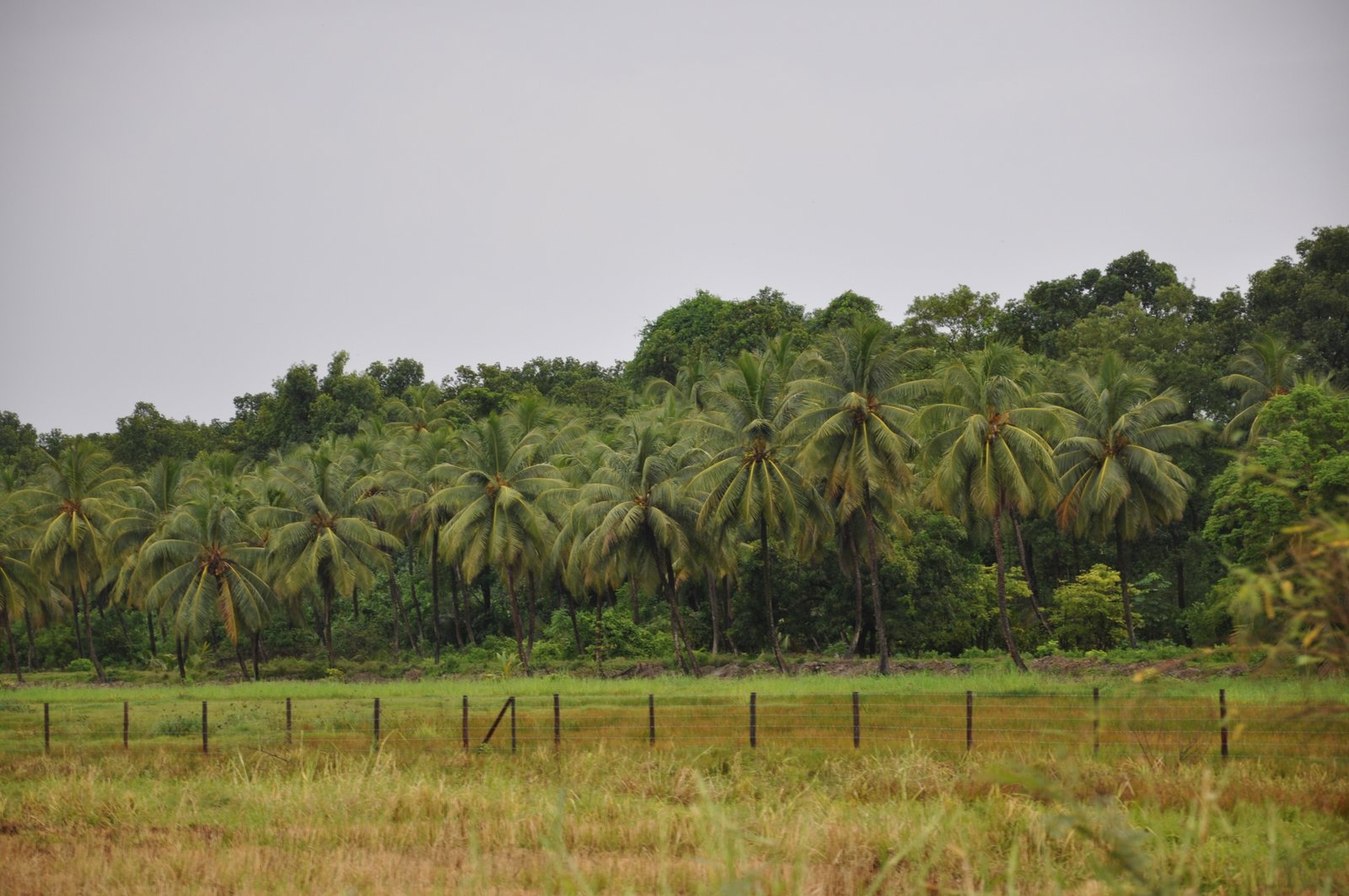

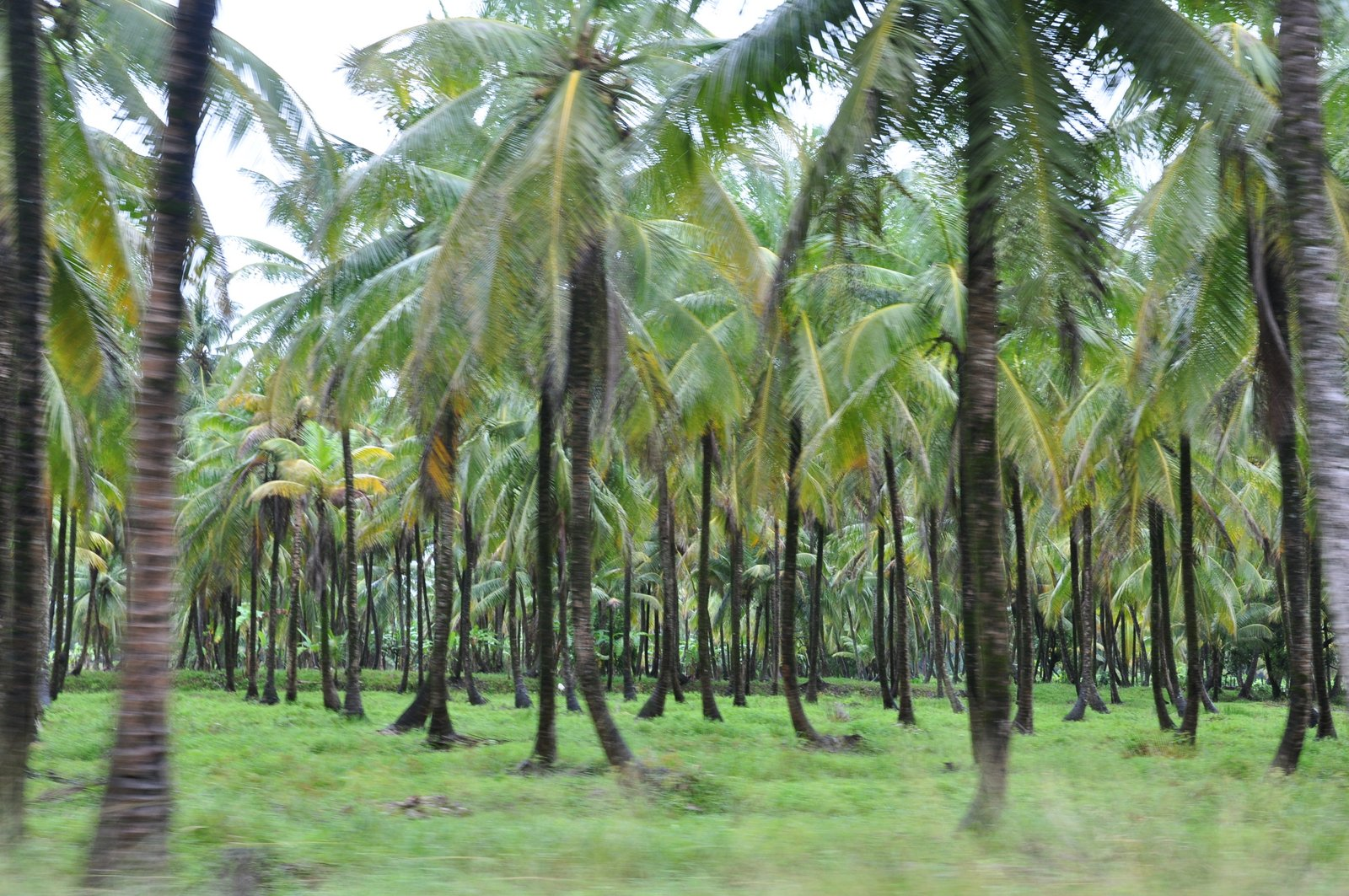

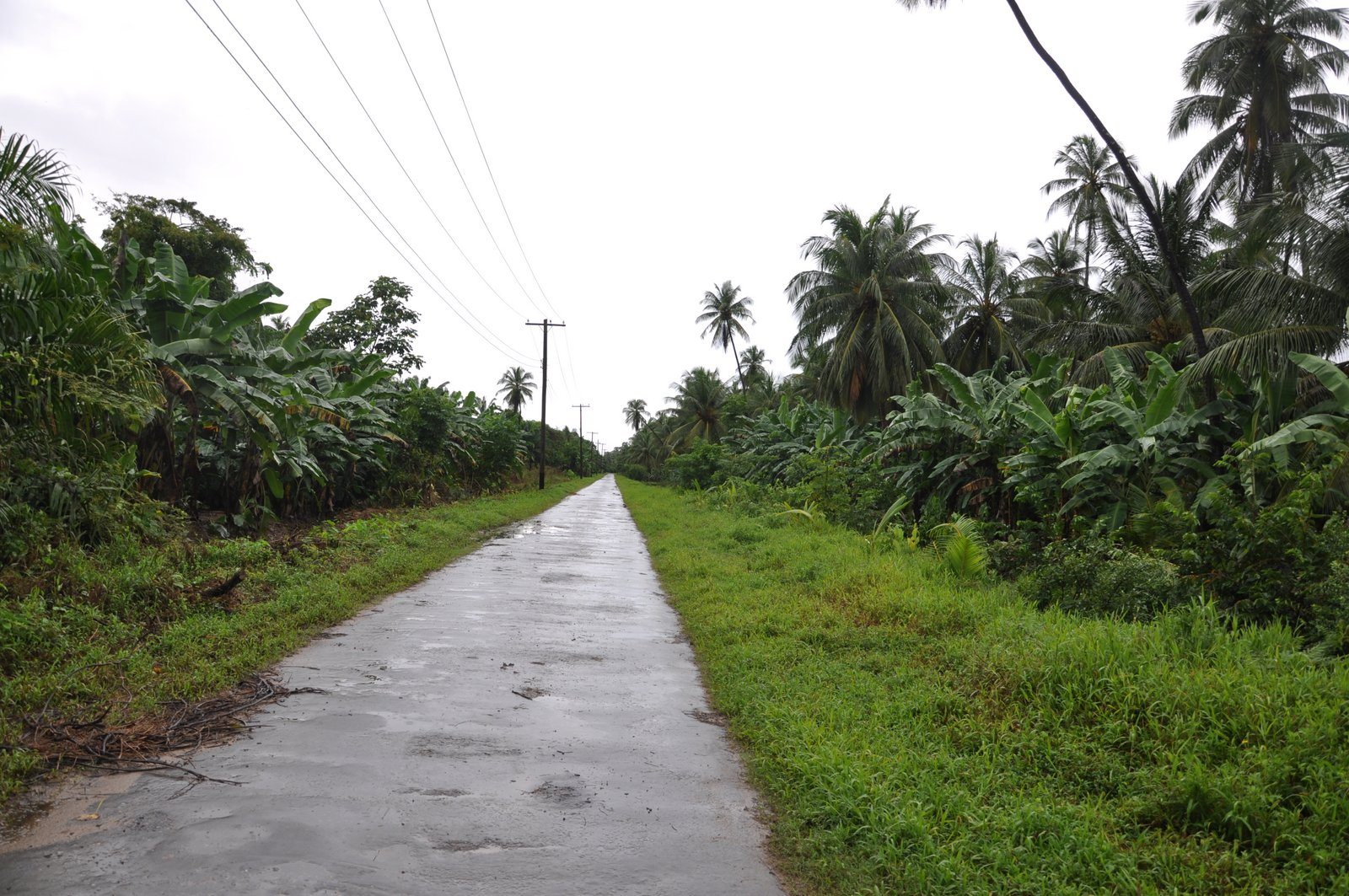

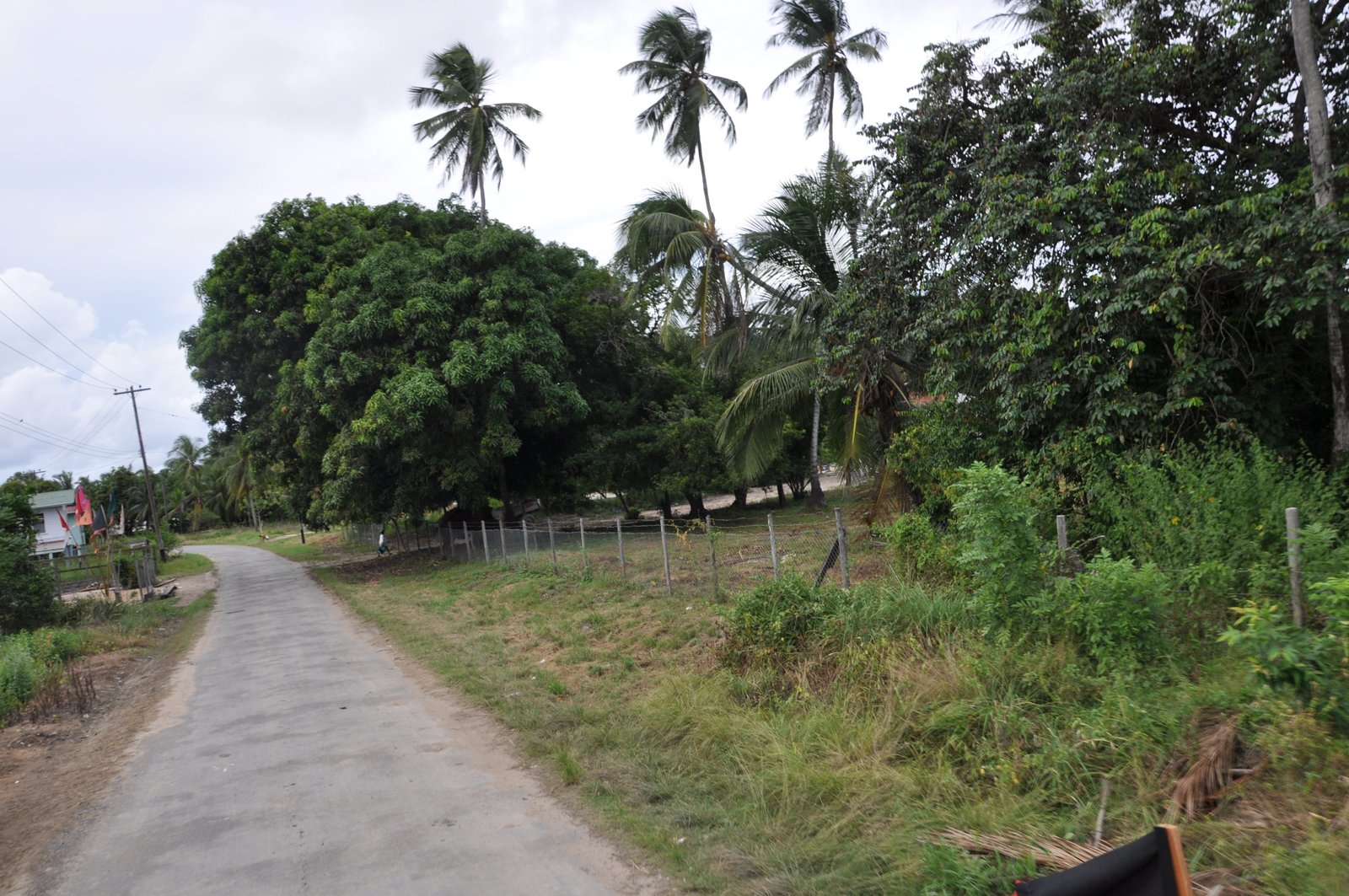
