= Fort Zeelandia (Guyana) =

18th century Dutch fort in Guyana

- Part of Essequibo
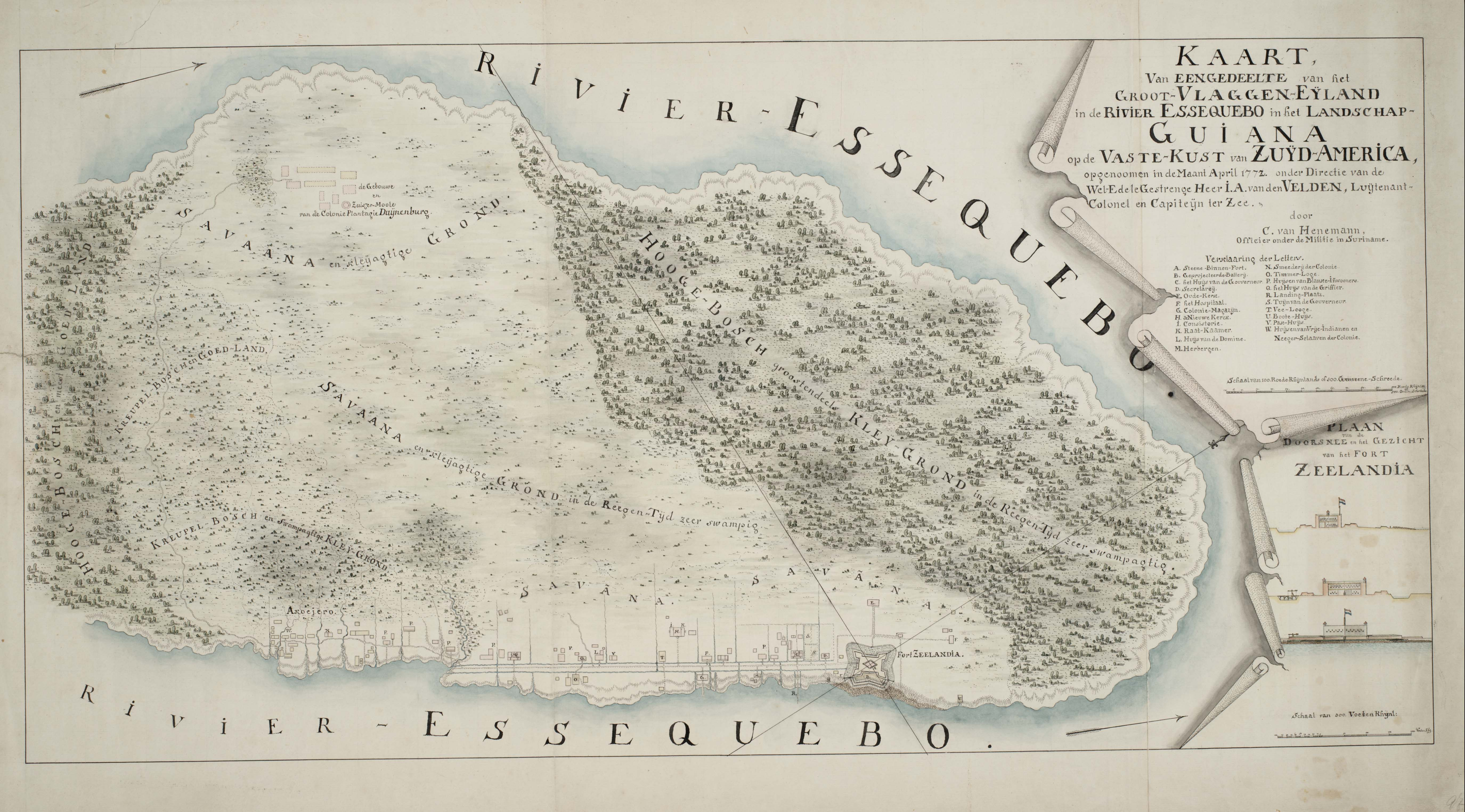
- Map of Fort Zeelandia on the Flag Island

Location
- Coordinates: 6.783333°N 58.516667°W

Site history
- Built: 1726

Garrison information
- Occupants: Dutch Republic (1726-1795); Batavian Republic/Commonwealth (1795-1806); Kingdom of Holland (1806-1810); First French Empire (1810-1813); Sovereign Principality of the United Netherlands (1813-1815)

Fort Zeelandia is located on Fort Island, a fluvial island of the Essequibo River delta in the Essequibo Islands-West Demerara region of Guyana. Not to be confused with Fort Zeelandia in Paramaribo, Suriname, the current brick fort was built in 1743 for the Essequibo colony, replacing an earlier wooden fort built in 1726, and is among the oldest structures in Guyana. The fort replaced Fort Kyk-Over-Al as the capital of Essequibo in 1739.

== Description ==
The small fort is a 15 x 20 m structure surrounded by four ramparts at each corner. Constructed during the Dutch possession of the region, the fort was a vital defensive fortification strategically located at the mouth of the Essequibo River.

== History ==
From the beginning of the 18th century, the commanders of Essequibo recommended that the location of the colony's administrative centre be removed as a result of the relocation of the Dutch settlers to the fertile banks of the Essequibo River.

In 1726, it was resolved that a fort should be constructed to protect the planters and the interest of the Dutch West India Company (DWIC). In 1726, Leslorant, an engineer, was sent from the Netherlands to construct a horn work with wooden redoubt and a strong palisade of the northern point of Vlaggeneiland (Flag Island). In August 1738, Laurens Storm van 's Gravesande, the Secretary to Commander Gleskerk, inspected the fort and reported that the structure was falling to pieces. He recommended to the Directors of the Netherlands that a new fort of brick be built to defend the interest of the DWIC.

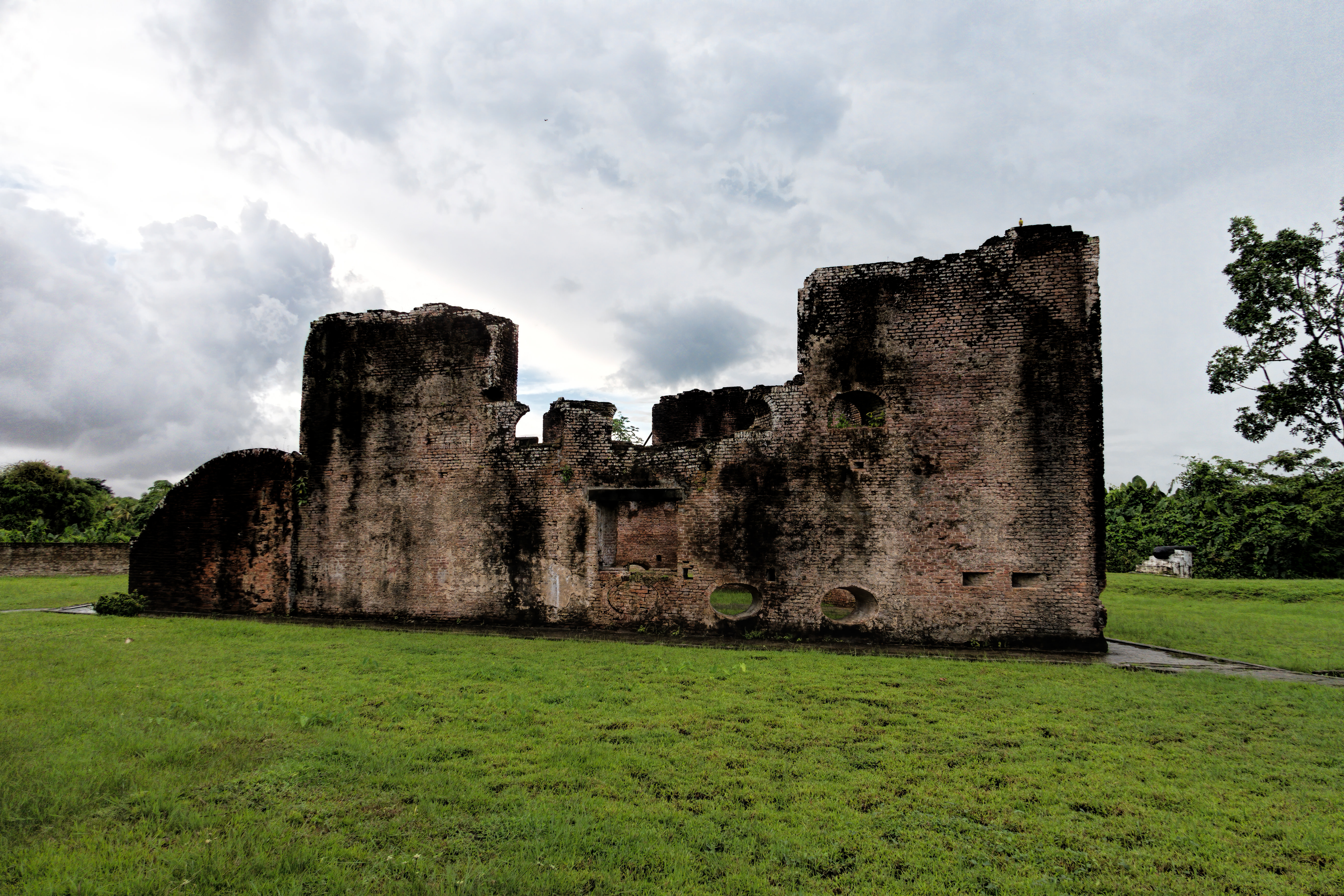
Ruins of Fort Zeelandia

Construction of the fort commenced in 1740 and, with the labour of enslaved Africans, the structure was completed in 1743. Brick was baked on the spot and mortar and trass were imported from Barbados and the Netherlands. However, the entire complex was completed in 1749, since construction was delayed as a result of the shortage of building materials and labour. The completed structure was then christened Fort Zeelandia, after the County of Zeeland in the Netherlands, from which many of the original settlers had originated.

The Lozenge shaped design of the fort, submitted by Storm van 's Gravesande, is similar to other forts constructed in West Africa during that period. Fort Zeelandia consisted of a redoubt of fifty square feet, with walls thick enough to endure the heaviest ordnance. There were two stories; the lower served as a warehouse for provisions and a safe powder house whilst the upper floor housed the soldiers, with a room for the non commissioned officers. Twenty gunports, each holding a 2 or 3-pounder gun, were found on each storey.

By 1781, during the Fourth Anglo-Dutch War, the fort was no longer in a fit state to be of any use. When some six British privateers arrived in late February 1781, the Council at Essequibo instructed Captain Severyn, the commander of the fort, that if the British sailed towards the colony, he was to fire a blank shot. If that did not cause them to stop, he was to fire a pro-forma shot and surrender. The privateers captured 16 Dutch vessels and sailed away. A few days later, two British sloops-of-war, HMS Barbuda and HMS Surprise, that Admiral Lord Rodney had sent appeared at Demerara and Essequibo and accepted their surrender.

The British takeover was short-lived, as the French occupied the island in the following year. The Dutch regained control of the fort two years later and, by 1796, the fort went into a long period of decline, as attention shifted towards the colony of Demerara.

== World Heritage status ==
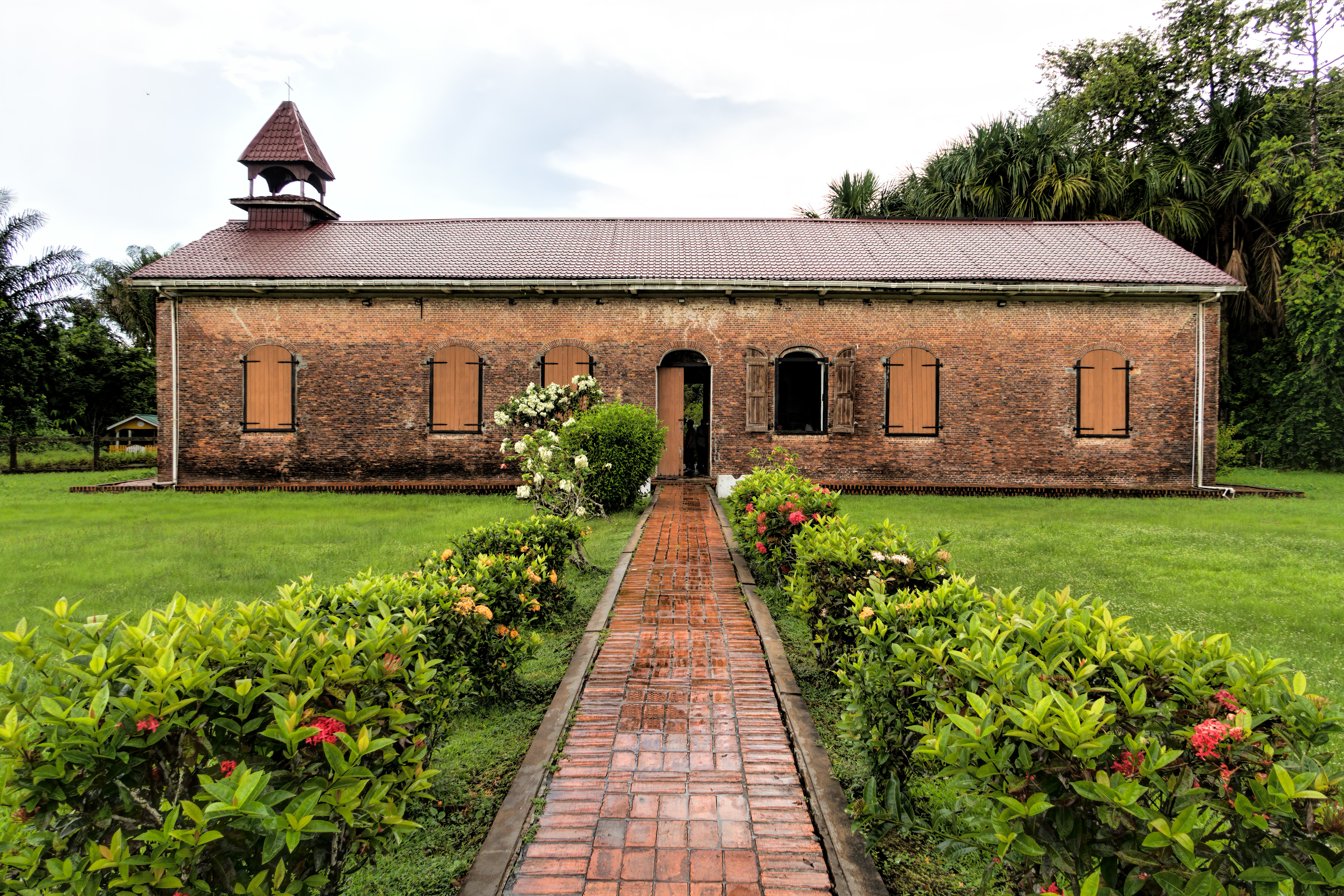
Court of Policy building.

This site, along with the Court of Policy Building, was added to the UNESCO World Heritage Site Tentative List on 15 November 1995, in the Cultural category. The site has also been designated as a National Monument by the National Trust of Guyana.
