= Zeelandia, Guyana =

Zeelandia
- Village
- Location in Guyana
- Coordinates: 7°01′N 58°27′W
- Country: Guyana
- Region: Essequibo Islands-West Demerara

Population (2012)
  - Total: 211

Zeelandia is a village on Wakenaam, in the Essequibo Islands-West Demerara region of Guyana. The village is named after the sugar plantation Zeelandia.

Located at the extreme northern end of the island facing the Atlantic Ocean, Zeelandia is a fishing village. The area is subject to land degradation and flooding.

Zeelandia is also home to many agricultural farms, growing items such as rice, coconut, and various other fruits and vegetables.
