= Ruyterwacht =

- Ruyterwacht's location in Western Cape
- Coordinates: 33°55′10″S 18°33′25″E
- Country: South Africa
- Province: Western Cape
- City: Cape Town

Area
  - Total: 1.41 km^{2} (0.54 sq mi)

Population (2011)
  - Total: 8,993
  - Density: 6,378/km^{2} (16,520/sq mi)

Races
  - White: 32.8%
  - Asian: 1.2%
  - Cape Coloureds: 50.1%
  - Black: 12.3%
  - Other: 3.6%

Languages
  - English: 47.1%
  - Afrikaans: 41.8%
  - Xhosa: 3.1%
  - Other: 8.0%

Ruyterwacht is a suburb of Cape Town, South Africa, bordering the industrial area of Epping and the formerly Cape Coloured neighborhood of Elsie's River as well as the GrandWest Casino.

Eppingtuin ("Epping Garden Village"), as Ruyterwacht was once known, began as a subsidized housing project for underprivileged/poor white South Africans which has now been seized by a property company Communicare which has unlawfully sold the subsidized social housing and evicted poor families. In its early years as an independent township, it was administered by the Urban Housing Bureau under the Cape Town Divisional Council. Ons gemeentelike feesalbum (1951) includes an article on the Eppingtuin Reformed Church on the neighborhood's founding: "On September 7, 1938, the Centenary Year [of the Great Trek] seventy families descended from Voortrekkers moved in among the luxuriant pines and crawling wildlife. Descended from sturdy Afrikaner stock, they swelled to several hundred in a matter of months."

The church hall of the mother congregation in Ruyterwacht is named after Zerilda Steyn, chairwoman of the Urban Housing Association (Afrikaans: Stedelike Behuisingsbond) from 1945 to her death in 1963.

== Sources ==
- Olivier, Rev. P.L. (compiler) (1952). Ons gemeentelike feesalbum. Cape Town/Pretoria: N.G. Kerk-uitgewers.
- Potgieter, D.J. (ed.) (1972). Standard Encyclopaedia of Southern Africa. Cape Town: Nasionale Opvoedkundige Uitgewery (Nasou).
