= National Trust of Guyana =

- Formation: 1972
- Legal status: Trust
- Headquarters: Georgetown, Guyana
- Location: Guyana
- Chairperson: Patrice La Fleur (2019)
- Website: nationaltrust.gov.gy

The National Trust of Guyana is a 1972 Guyanese conservation organisation to protect and conserve monuments of historic and national importance. Their main function is to preserve objects of national interest as well as managing their access by the public.

Promotion and conservation efforts are done through publications and exhibitions, including a radio program called ‘Heritage Minute’.

As of 2020, Guyana has no properties inscribed on UNESCO's world heritage listing.

== History ==
On 1 January 1963, the National History and Culture Council was established to promote and study the history of Guyana. On 10 January 1964, the Council recommended the foundation of a National Trust to preserve the most important monuments.

The National Trust of Guyana was established by the National Trust Act, No. 7 of 1972, and is responsible for all monuments. The term monuments was defined as "any building, structure, object or other work of man or of nature whether above or below the surface of the land or the floor of the sea within territorial waters of Guyana and any site, cave or excavation."

In 2015, a project to restore St. George's Cathedral was embarked upon by the Bishop of the Anglican Diocese of Guyana.

Promotion and conservation efforts are done through publications and exhibitions, including a radio program called ‘Heritage Minute’.

== National Monuments ==
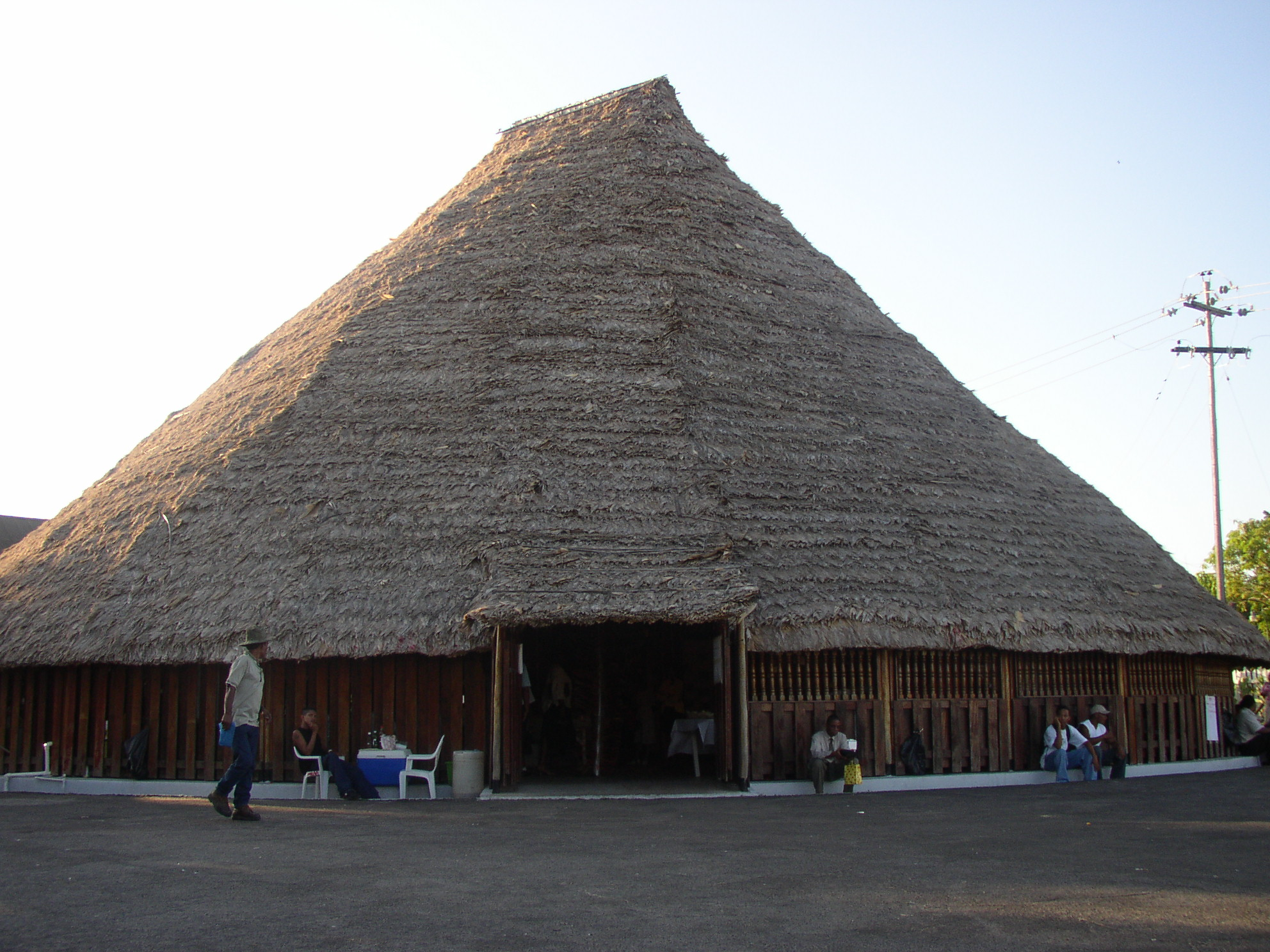
Umana Yana

National Monuments are gazetted after approval by the cabinet. As of 2019, there are nine National Monuments:

- Fort Zeelandia and the Court of Policy
- Fort Kyk-Over-Al
- Fort Nassau
- State House
- Red House
- Umana Yana and the African Liberation Monument
- 1763 Monument
- St. George's Cathedral
- Non-aligned Monument
