= Met-en-Meerzorg =

Met-en-Meerzorg Meten-Meer-Zorg
- Village
- Location in Guyana
- Coordinates: 6°52′38″N 58°19′27″W
- Country: Guyana
- Region: Essequibo Islands-West Demerara

Population (2012)
  - Total: 3,910
- Time zone: UTC-4
- Climate: Af

Met-en-Meerzorg (also Meten-Meer-Zorg) is a village located on the West Coast of Demerara in the region of Essequibo Islands-West Demerara in Guyana. The village was named after the sugar plantation Met en Meerzorg.

The community was founded in 1871. The village consists of a housing estate and a squatted village. The informal settlement was composed of fourroom houses constructed with walls made from zinc or wood. In 1997, there was no running water and there had been electricity since 1994. As of 2015, a large scale housing project was started in the village. The village has a health centre, a primary school, and a professional learning college. Met-en-Meerzorg is home to the Guyana Heritage Museum which was founded in 1994.
