= Zeeburg, Guyana =

- Location in Guyana
- Coordinates: 6.87607°N 58.31373°W
- Country: Guyana
- Admin. division: Essequibo Islands-West Demerara

Population (2012)
  - Total: 753

Zeeburg is a village located on the West Coast of Demerara in Guyana, South America. Zeeburg is 30.6km far from the capital of Guyana. The village, in the administrative region Essequibo Islands-West Demerara (Region 3) was named by the Dutch during their occupation of Guyana.

Zeeburg is bordered on the north by the Atlantic Ocean, to the east by DeGroot En Klyn and to the west by DeWillem. Like most West Demerara villages, Zeeburg is bordered to the south by sugar cane fields.

The majority of people residing in Zeeburg are of East Indian descent, usually called Indo-Guyanese (descendants of the Indian indentured labourers) most of whom work on the sugar plantation of Uitvlugt/Leonora Estate and the vibrant fishing port which is based at the popular Zeeburg koker.

Zeeburg is also the home of Zeeburg Secondary School which always played a critical role in the education system of Region 3 since its existence and the traditional Zeeburg market that is held every Saturday.
