= Vreed en Hoop =

- Village and regional capital
- Location in Guyana
- Coordinates: 6.80763°N 58.18154°W
- Country: Guyana
- Region: Essequibo Islands-West Demerara

Population (2012)
  - Total: 469
- Time zone: UTC-4
- Climate: Af

Vreed en Hoop is a village at the mouth of the Demerara River on its west bank, in theEssequibo Islands-West Demerara region of Guyana, located at sea level. It is the location of the Regional Democratic Council office making it the administrative center for the region. There is also a police station, magistrate's court and post office.

== History ==
Vreed en Hoop encompasses a few small communities, among them New Road, Plantain Walk, Crane and Coglan Dam. The name of the town comes from the Dutch "Vreed en Hoop", meaning "Peace and Hope" in English.

The name is derived from the Plantation Vreed en Hoop which already existed in 1798. In 1828 ownership changed to Sir John Gladstone who became the permanent absentee planter. At the time of the emancipation of slavery, the plantation had 415 slaves. In 1838, Gladstone was the first planter to expel most of his former slaves, and replace them with indentured servants from India. In 1839, newspapers started to report physical abuse at his plantations, therefore Gladstone quietly transferred ownership.

Vreed en Hoop also consists of a market and other shopping stores. It has an educational institute for children and a college where teachers go for training.

== Transport ==
In 1900, the Demerara-Essequibo Railway opened between Vreed en Hoop and Greenwich Park. In 1914, the line was extended to Parika. The railway remained in operation until 1974.

Passenger boats (speedboats) traverse the Demerara River linking Vreed en Hoop to the capital city of Georgetown in about five minutes, much faster than using the Demerara Harbour Bridge (DHB). For safety, passengers must use the lifejackets provided. The busy terminal connects travellers to the West Bank Demerara road up to Parika, with cars and minibuses plying the routes.

== Plastic City ==
Plastic City is a shanty town located within Vreed en Hoop. It is located a quarter mile from the village. To the north is a jetty that leads to the Atlantic Ocean, and out of sight, there is a makeshift village. Plastic City started in the early 1990s and has been growing ever since. The main problem is the lack of access to water and electricity, and the proneness to flooding.

Presidents have promised to solve the problem, and Opposition leaders have visited the area, but as of 2020, Plastic City remains.

== Climate ==
Vreed en Hoop has a tropical rainforest climate (Af) with heavy rainfall year-round.

Climate data for Vreed en Hoop
Month	Jan	Feb	Mar	Apr	May	Jun	Jul	Aug	Sep	Oct	Nov	Dec	Year
Mean daily maximum °C (°F)	28.8 (83.8)	29.1 (84.4)	29.4 (84.9)	29.8 (85.6)	29.5 (85.1)	29.2 (84.6)	29.5 (85.1)	30.3 (86.5)	31.1 (88.0)	30.9 (87.6)	30.3 (86.5)	29.5 (85.1)	29.8 (85.6)
Daily mean °C (°F)	26.1 (79.0)	26.4 (79.5)	26.7 (80.1)	27.0 (80.6)	26.7 (80.1)	26.3 (79.3)	26.4 (79.5)	27.0 (80.6)	27.7 (81.9)	27.5 (81.5)	27.1 (80.8)	26.6 (79.9)	26.8 (80.2)
Mean daily minimum °C (°F)	23.5 (74.3)	23.8 (74.8)	24.0 (75.2)	24.3 (75.7)	24.0 (75.2)	23.5 (74.3)	23.4 (74.1)	23.7 (74.7)	24.3 (75.7)	24.1 (75.4)	23.9 (75.0)	23.8 (74.8)	23.9 (74.9)
Average rainfall mm (inches)	235 (9.3)	125 (4.9)	133 (5.2)	163 (6.4)	302 (11.9)	336 (13.2)	272 (10.7)	192 (7.6)	86 (3.4)	92 (3.6)	168 (6.6)	285 (11.2)	2,389 (94)
Source: Climate-Data.org

== Notable people ==
- Mohamed Shahabuddeen (1931–2018), International Court of Justice judge.
