= Essequibo Islands-West Demerara =

Region of Guyana

Coordinates: 6.715056°N 58.54902°W

Essequibo Islands-West Demerara Region 3
- Administrative region
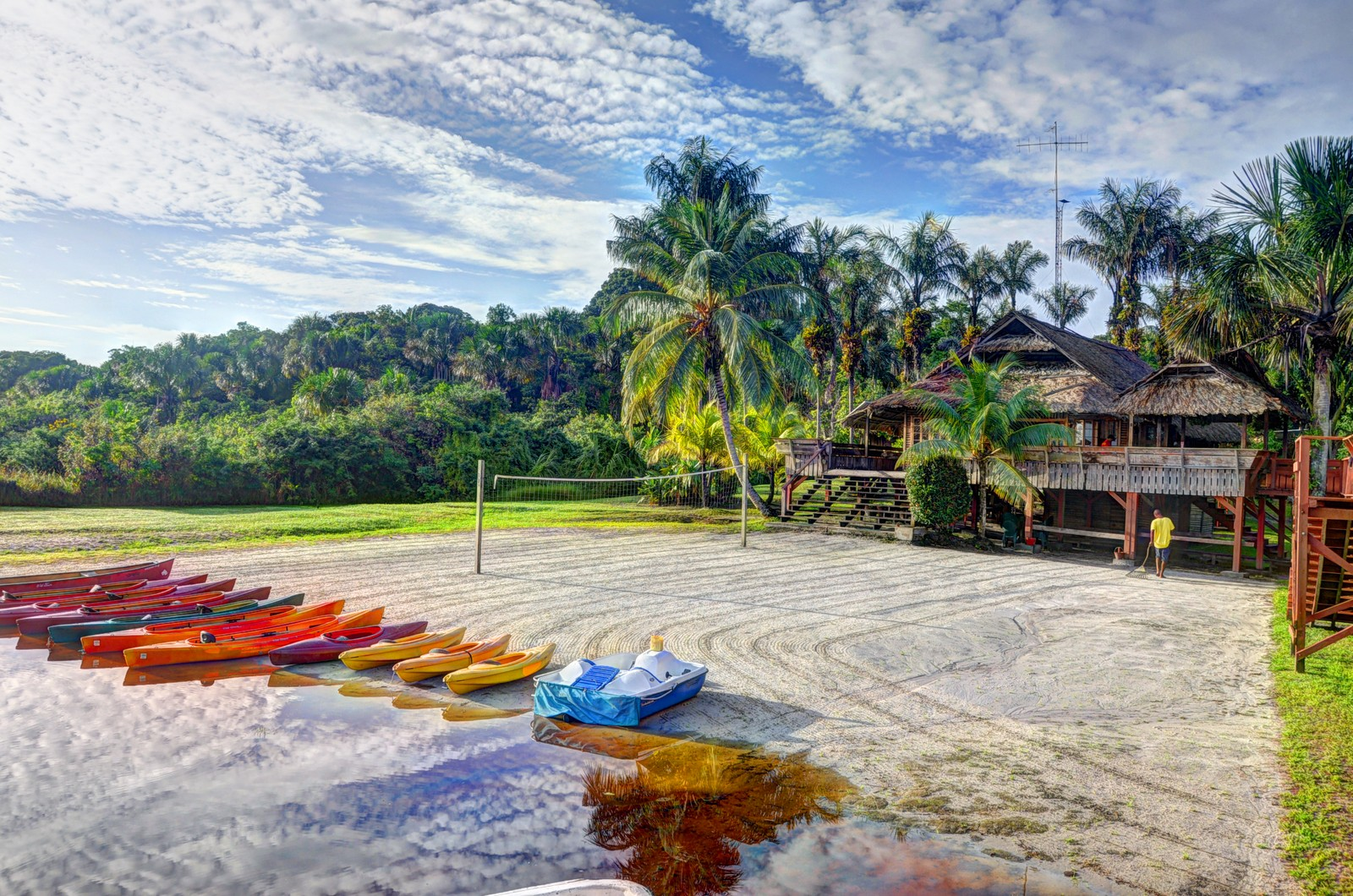
- Arrowpoint

- Flag

- Map of Guyana showing Essequibo Islands-West Demerara region
- Country: Guyana
- Regional capital: Vreed-en-Hoop
- Largest village: Tuschen

Area
  - Total: 3,755 km^{2} (1,450 sq mi)

Population (2022 census)
  - Total: 143,884
  - Density: 38.32/km^{2} (99.24/sq mi)

Essequibo Islands-West Demerara (Region 3) is a region of Guyana. Its capital is Vreed-en-Hoop. It is located between the Essequibo and Demerara Rivers, and consists of a number of islands near the mouth of the Essequibo River. It is spread over an area of 3,755 km^{2} (1,450 sq mi), and is the second smallest region by area in Guyana. As per the 2022 census, it had a population of 143,884 inhabitants, making it the second most populous region. The major economic activities include livestock rearing and agriculture.

== Geography ==
Essequibo Islands-West Demerara (Region 5) is one of the ten administrative regions of Guyana. It is spread over an area of 3,755 km^{2} (1,450 sq mi), and is the second smallest of the ten regions of Guyana by area. The region was established during the 1980 administrative reform of Guyana consisting of parts of the West Demerara-Essequibo Coast district. It extends from the east of the Essequibo River to the west bank of the Demerara River, and incorporates the Essequibo Islands near the mouth of the Essequibo River. There are about 365 islands on the Essequibo River of which the largest are Hogg Island, and Sloth Island. Its capital is Vreed-en-Hoop.

The topography consists of mostly low lying coastal plains with clay and sandy hills are present towards the interior. he region has about 0.26 million hectares of forested area, covering about 78% of its land area.

The district has a tropical rainforest climate (Köppen climate classification: Af) with an average annual temperature is 28.06 °C (82.51 °F). The district receives an average annual rainfall of 11.56 cm (4.55 in) and has 229.6 average rainy days in a year.

== Demographics and economy ==
As per the official census in 1980, the region had a population of 104,750 inhabitants. It decreased to 95,975 in the 1991 census, before increasing to 103,061 during the 2002 census. As per the 2022 census, it had a population of 143,884 inhabitants, making it the second most populous region. Most of the population reside along the coast.

The major economic activities include livestock rearing and agriculture. Major agricultural produce include rice, and vegetables. The Boerasirie Extension Project was a reclamation project, that involved rescuing thousands of hectares of land for agriculture. There are several rice mills in the region.

== Communities ==
List of communities/settlements:

- Ampa Bay (Post Ampa)
- Anna Catherina
- Caledonia
- Cornelia Ida
- De Jonge Rachael
- De Willem
- Den Amstel (Den Amstel Village, Amstel)
- Fort Island
- Fredericksburg
- Goed Fortuin
- Hague Backdam (Hague Front/Jib, Hague)
- Harlem
- Hogg Island
- Hopetown
- Hubu
- La Parfaite Harmonie
- Leonora
- Louisiana
- LA-Grange
- Makouria
- McDoom Village (McDoom)
- Met-en-Meerzorg (Meten-Meer-Zorg)
- Melville
- Morasi
- Nismes
- Noitgedacht
- Parika
- Patentia
- Phoenix Town
- Ruimzight
- Santa Mission (Santa Aratak)
- Sarah
- Saxacalli (Saxakalli, Saxsacali)
- Schoonord (Schoon Ord)
- Stanleytown
- Stewartville
- Tuschen
- Uitvlugt
- Vergenoegen
- Greenwich Park
- Barnwell
- Philadelphia
- Good Hope
- Ruby
- Farm
- Vreed-en-Hoop
- Vriesland
- Vive-la-force, Guyana
- Windsor Forest
- Zeeburg
- Zeelandia

== Gallery ==
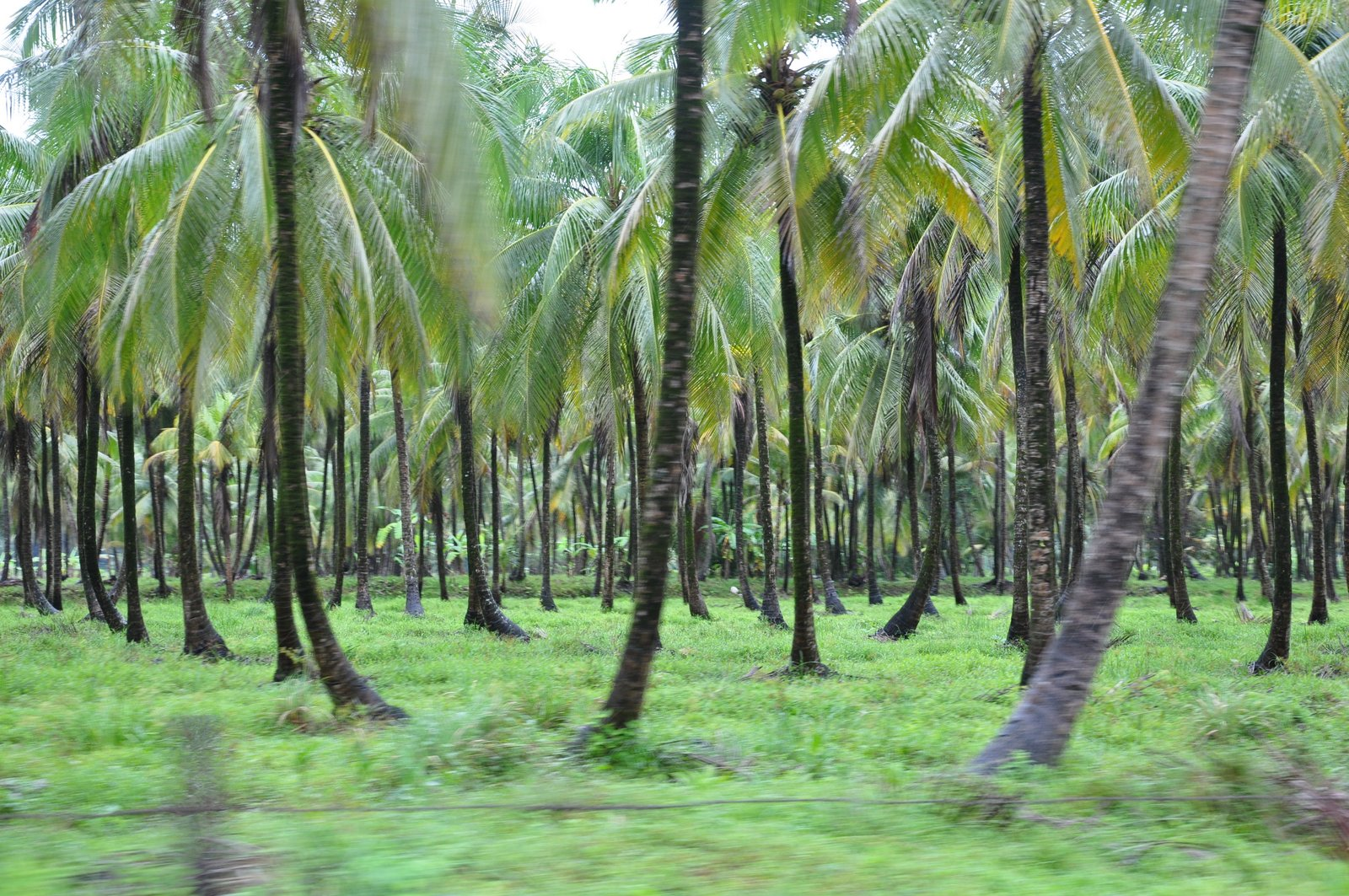
Coconut grove on Wakenaam Island, Essequibo River

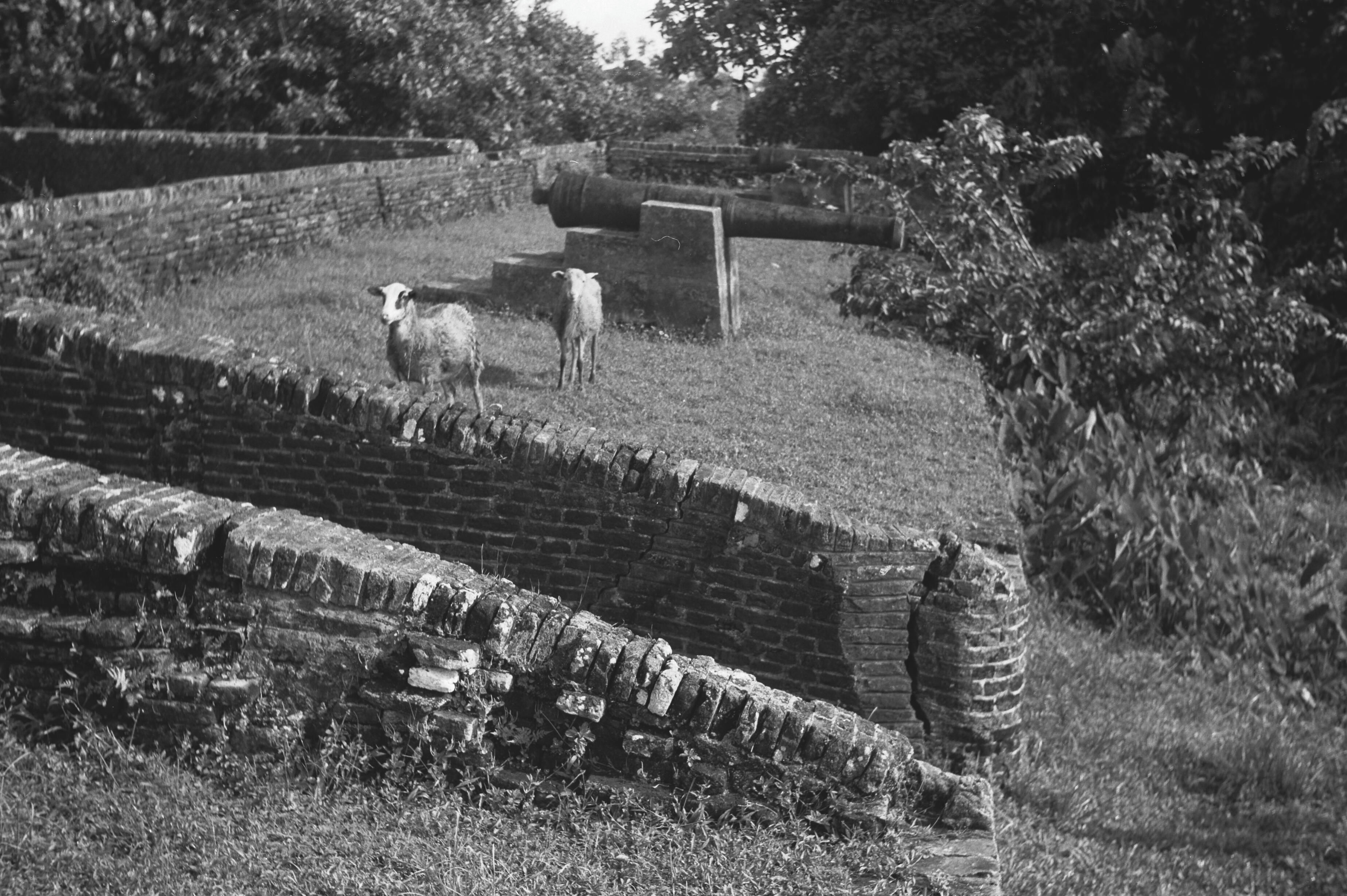
Ruins of Fort Zeelandia on Fort Island, Essequibo River

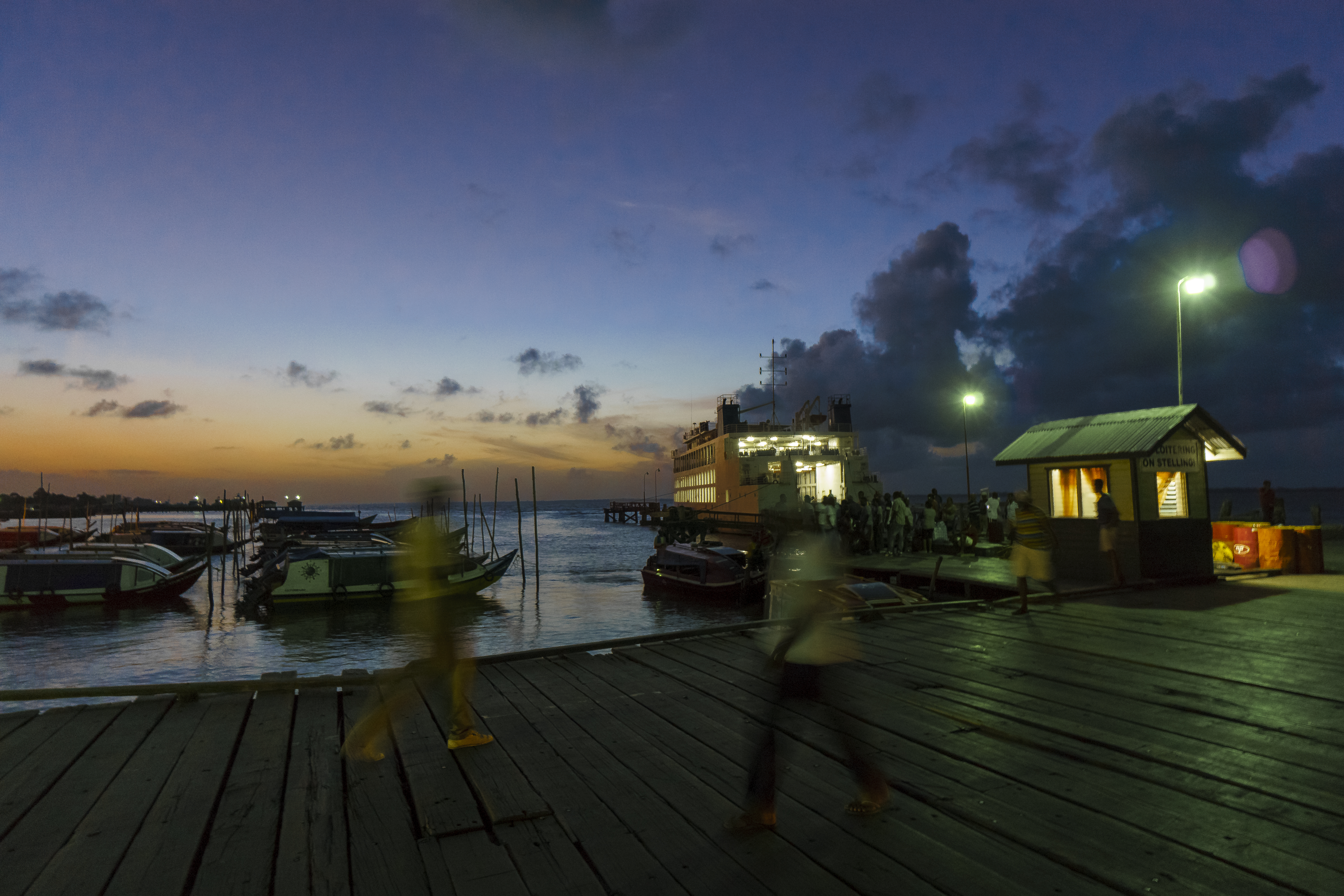
Parika on the east bank of the Essequibo River

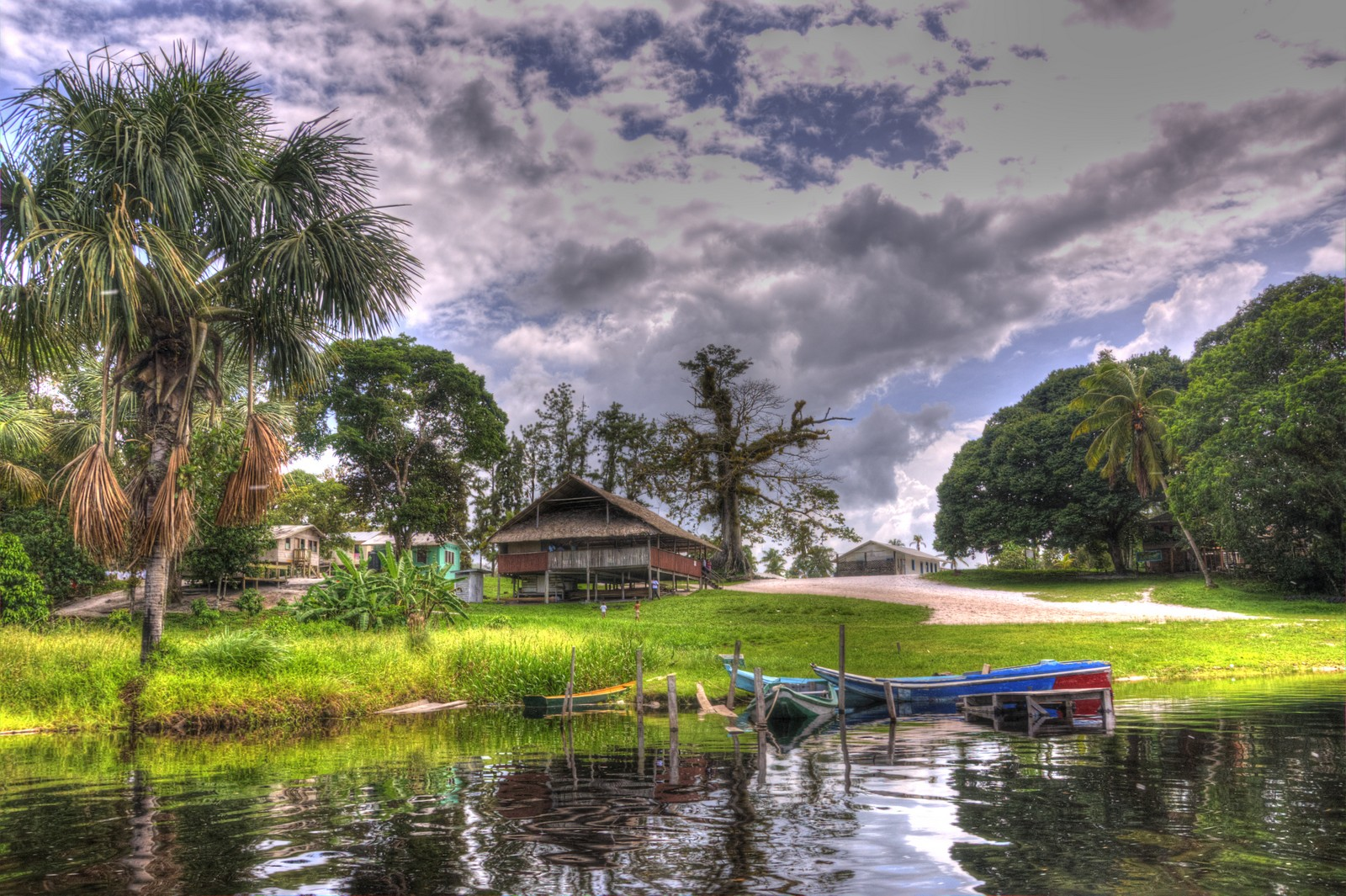
Santa Mission a nature reserve

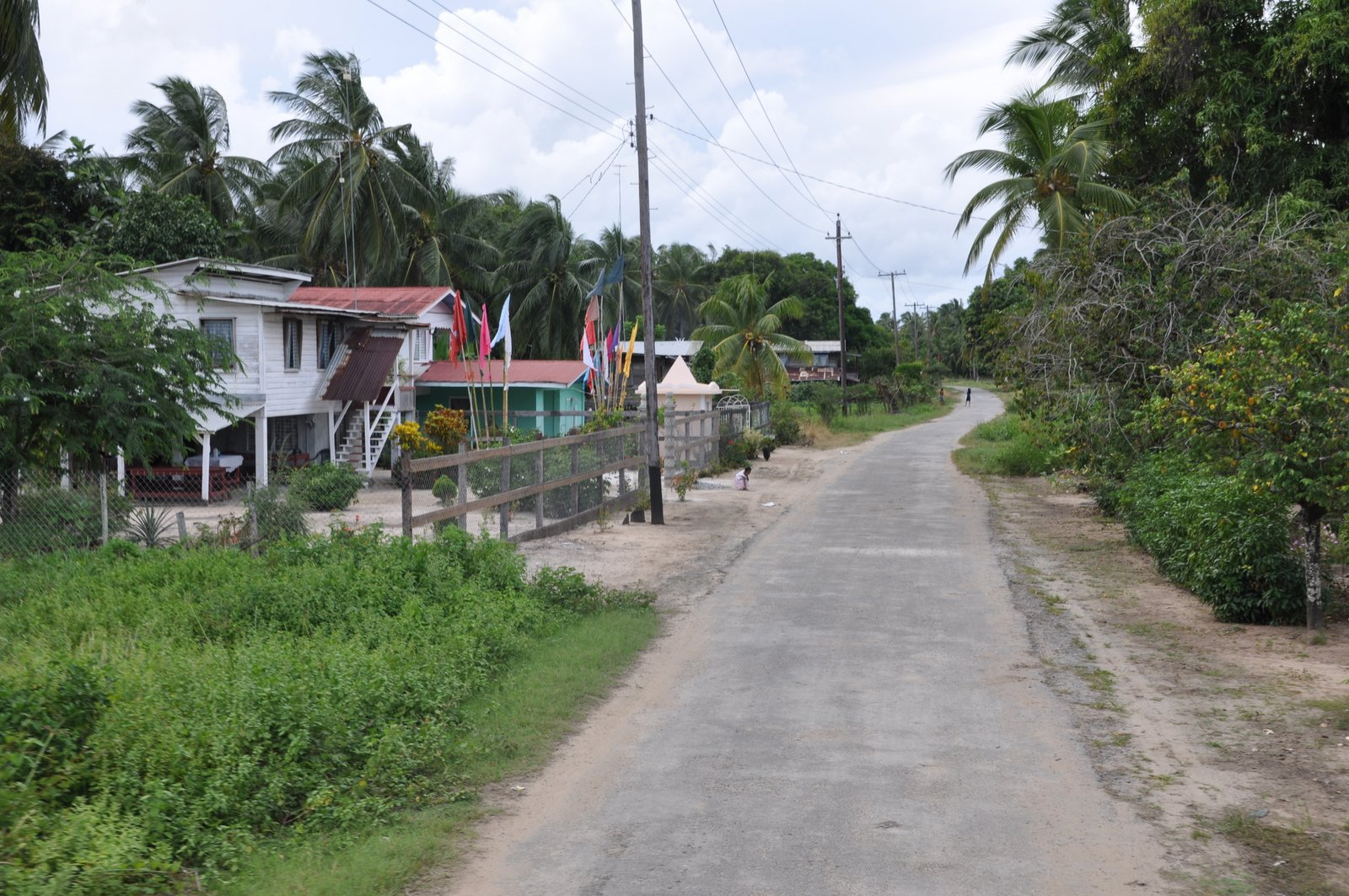
Trail in Wakenaam

== See also ==
- Fort Zeelandia
