= Hogg Island, Guyana =

Island in Guyana

Hogg Island
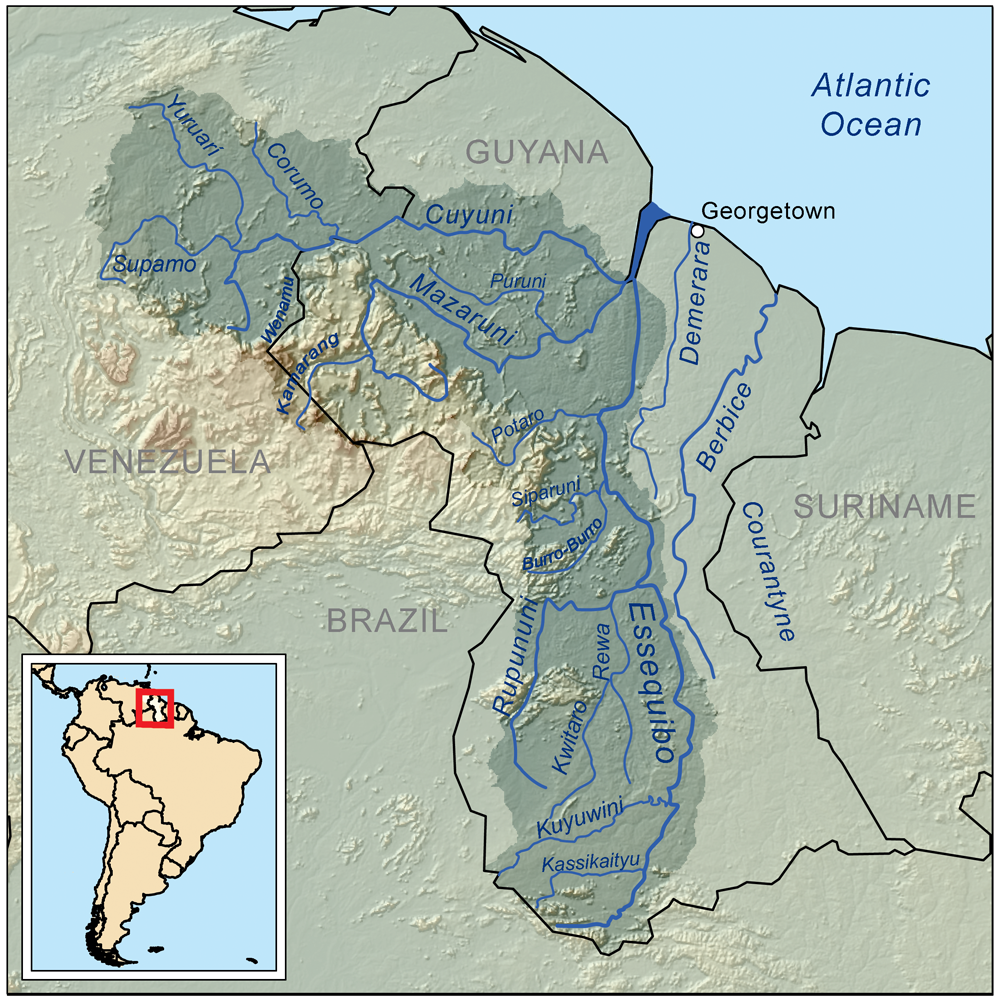
- The flow of the Essequibo River through Guyana to its estuary into the Atlantic Ocean
- Interactive map of Hogg Island

Geography
- Location: Essequibo River
- Coordinates: 6°49′27″N 58°31′54″W
- Archipelago: Essequibo Islands
- Area: 23 sq mi (60 km^{2})

Administration
- Guyana
- Essequibo Islands-West Demerara

Demographics
- Population: c. 200 (2020)

Hogg Island (sometimes referred to as Hog Island) is the largest island in the Essequibo River in Guyana. Covering an area of 59 km^{2} (23 sq mi), it lies in the Essequibo Islands–West Demerara region near the river's mouth when it flows into the Atlantic Ocean. As per 2020 estimate, the island hosts approximately 200 people.

Originally named Varken Eiland ("Pig Island") by the Dutch in the 17th century, it hosts Guyana's only historic brick windmill (built in 1768), restored and promoted as a tourism site. The primary economy centers on agriculture, and heritage tourism. The culture reflects a blend of rural Essequibo traditions and Dutch colonial legacy.

== History ==
The island was controlled by the Dutch in the 17th century, when it was known as Varken Eiland ("Pig Island"), so named due to it being inhabited by a large number of wild hogs. When the British gained control of the island in 1803, they decided to keep the name of the island as "Hogg Island".

== Geography ==
Hogg is the largest island in the Essequibo River, the longest river in Guyana. Covering an area of 59 km^{2} (23 sq mi), it lies about 5 km (3.1 mi) upstream of the river's mouth when it flows into the Atlantic Ocean in the Essequibo Islands–West Demerara region. The island is prone to flooding and there are canals and spillways built in place to manage flooding and drainage.

== Demographics and economy ==
An estimated 200 people lived in the island as of 2020, largely residing near the island's center in small communities. The primary economy centers on agriculture and heritage tourism. Recent infrastructure investments include drainage enhancements. A new Western Hogg Island Primary School opened in July 2024.

Hogg Island hosts Guyana's only historic brick windmill, built in 1768, now restored and promoted as a tourism site. It is located on the former plantation of Lyksburg. The National Trust of Guyana restored the mill in 2010, and it has been declared a national monument.
