= York Light Infantry Volunteers =

Light infantry regiment of the British Army

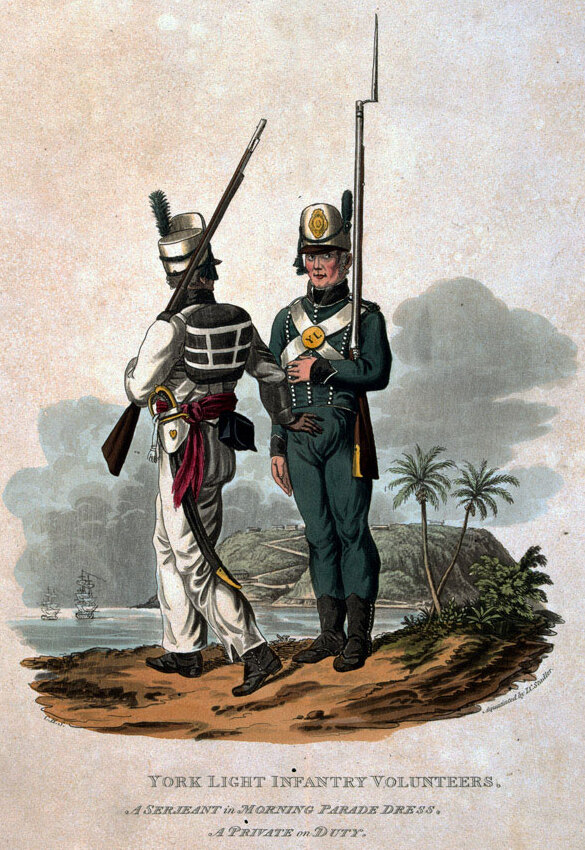
- 1812 engraving of a regimental sergeant (left) in morning parade dress and private (right) in regular uniform
- Founded: September 1803
- Disbanded: 19 March 1817
- Allegiance: United Kingdom
- Branch: British Army
- Role: Light infantry
- Size: 10–12 companies 650–1,800 men
- Garrison/HQ: West Indies
- Colors: Green and black
- Engagements: Napoleonic Wars; Caribbean campaign of 1803–1810; Invasion of Surinam; Invasion of Martinique; Invasion of Guadeloupe

The York Light Infantry Volunteers (YLIV) was a light infantry regiment of the British Army which existed from 1803 to 1817. It was formed in September 1803 as the Barbados Volunteer Emigrants (BVE) from prisoners of war captured when British forces occupied the Dutch colonies of Demerara, Essequibo and Berbice during the Napoleonic Wars. The unit's officers were mostly Britons transferred from other units or commissioned from the ranks. The BVE was renamed in January 1804 as the "York Light Infantry Volunteers".

A further number of troops were recruited to the unit from French prisoners of war and soldiers who deserted to the British during the Peninsular War. The YLIV served for the entirety of its existence in the West Indies, seeing action in the Caribbean campaign of 1803–1810. It was present at the British invasion of Surinam in 1804 and the invasions of Martinique and Guadeloupe in 1809 and 1810. The regiment spent the final years of the Napoleonic Wars garrisoning Jamaica, before being sent to England in early 1817, where it was disbanded on 19 March.

== Formation ==
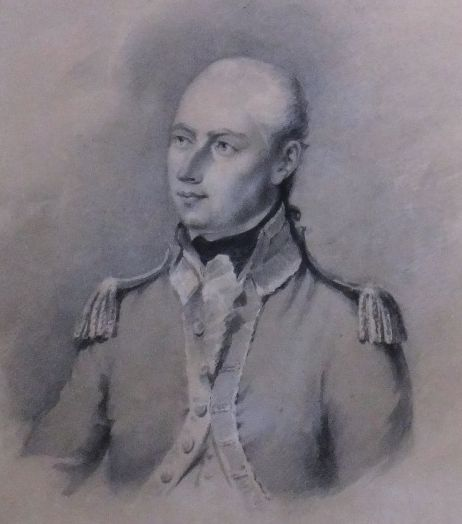
Lieutenant-General William Grinfield, who captured the original Dutch members of the regiment

In 1795, the Dutch Republic collapsed and was replaced by the Batavian Republic, a sister republic of France. The ousted William V, Prince of Orange went into exile in England, where he issued the Kew Letters ordering Dutch colonies to accept temporary British takeovers to prevent them from falling into French hands. Officials in the colonies of Surinam, Berbice, Essequibo and Demerara accepted Batavian rule and rejected the Kew Letters. In 1796, Demerara and Essequibo were captured by British forces, with their garrisons defecting to the British, who formed them into the Loyal Orange Brigade; Surinam and Berbice were left in Batavian hands. In 1799, William raised the King's Dutch Brigade from loyal Dutch army veterans and Batavian deserters for service in the British Army.

When the War of the Second Coalition ended on 25 March 1802 with the Treaty of Amiens, Demerara and Essequibo were returned to the Batavian Republic. The inhabitants of Dutch colonies in the Americas, however, were deeply opposed to Batavian rule. French colonial administrator Victor Hugues had recently visited the colonies, leading to fears among their inhabitants that in the case of war conflict in them would result in devastation that was equal to that seen during the invasion of Guadeloupe in 1794. To avoid this, they appealed to Britain for protection.

When the Napoleonic Wars began in May 1803, Batavian regular soldiers in the Berbice garrison mutinied, hoisting the Union Jack to signal their desire to come under British rule. The uprising was eventually put down by Batavian authorities after heavy fighting. On 16 September, British forces under Lieutenant-General William Grinfield arrived at Georgetown (then known as Stabroek) and offered terms of surrender to the Batavian colonies. Demerara and Essequibo capitulated on 20 September and Berbice followed five days later. Surinam was, as in 1796, left untouched. Having shown their disinterest in serving the Batavian Republic and with the likely alternative being starvation, over 1,000 Dutch troops, mostly from the Berbice garrison, chose to join the British army.

== Service ==
While some of the Dutch soldiers were recruited into the 60th Regiment of Foot, a majority were taken to the British colony of Barbados, where in September they were formed into a unit called the Barbados Volunteer Emigrants by Colonel Fitzroy Maclean. This new unit was organised into ten companies with a total strength of 1,804 men. The name of the regiment was changed to the York Light Infantry Volunteers (YLIV) in January 1804. New officers for the regiment were brought in from other British units already serving in the West Indies. The regimental lieutenant colonel, Francis Streicher, came from the 60th Foot, while its major, Francis Geraghty, was from the 6th West India Regiment. Many of the unit's subalterns were non-commissioned officers who had been commissioned into the officer corps. While the majority of officers were British, two lieutenants were Dutch.

The YLIV was officially incorporated into the British Army on 25 March 1804. In April an expedition including the regiment was brought together to finally capture the remaining Batavian colony, Surinam, which was not expected to surrender easily as its neighbours had. The expedition arrived off Surinam on 25 April, and after the colony's capital of Nieuw Amsterdam was outflanked during the British invasion, the Batavian defenders surrendered on 3 May. The regiment is not recorded as part of any of the notable events of the expedition. While the majority of the regiment was armed with slightly shortened muskets, around this time one company carried rifles.

In the following year the regiment was sent to garrison Barbados and Dominica. On 22 February a French force invaded Dominica, where the YLIV contingent was stationed at Scotts Head. The gun battery there fought off two French Navy ships of the line but the garrison had provisions for only one week, and so in the evening they retreated to St Rupert's Bay. From there the British units on the island gathered together around Fort Cabrit, which the invasion force was unable to capture, eventually withdrawing and sailing to Guadeloupe.

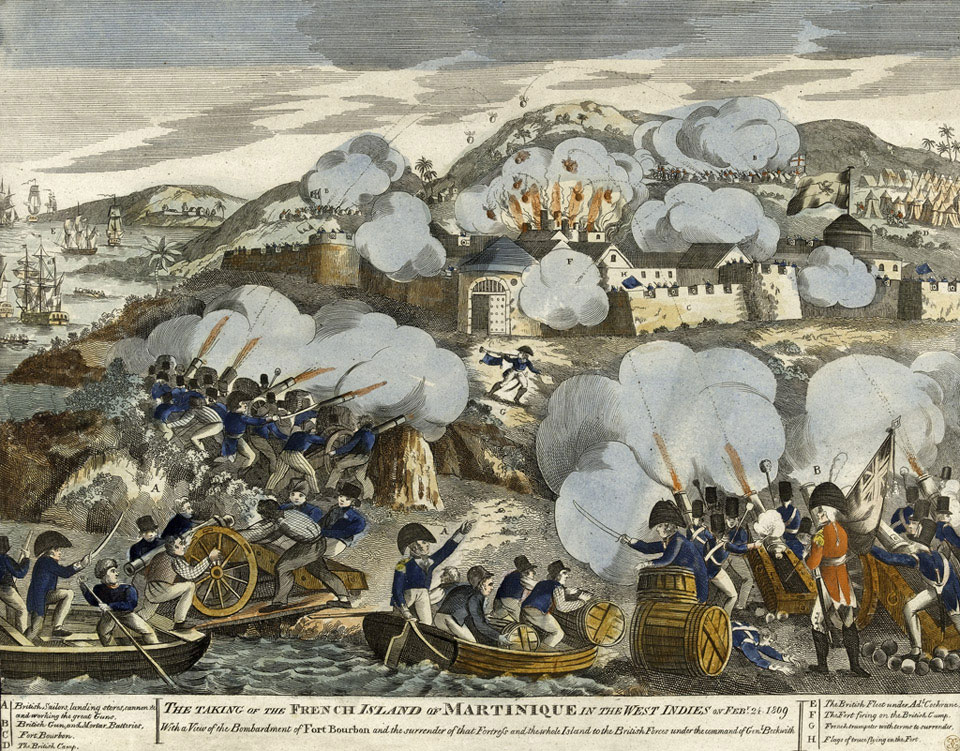
The 1809 invasion of Martinique, which the YLIV participated in

The regiment continued in its garrison role for several years, in 1807 being recorded at a strength of 650 men, still in the original ten companies. As the Caribbean campaign of 1803–1810 continued, 350 men of the unit fought in the 4th Brigade of Major-General Frederick Maitland's 2nd Division at the invasion of Martinique in 1809. The division landed at Sainte-Luce on 30 January, meeting no resistance as they reached Lamentin on 2 February. They then arrived at the heavily defended Fort Desaix a day later, entrenching nearby to cover a possible landing place. On 5 February the division moved on to the capital Fort-de-France, participating in its siege. The French surrendered on 24 February. Later in the year the regiment served onboard Royal Navy warships as part of the blockading fleet operating off Guadeloupe.

In 1810 a detachment of 200 men from the regiment participated in the invasion of Guadeloupe. Part of the 4th Brigade of Major-General Thomas Hislop's 1st Division, they left Dominica on 16 January and arrived at Capesterre-Belle-Eau two days later. They landed on 27 January. The division marched south without issue and reached Trois-Rivières, where the French defenders abandoned their positions. The division stayed there to assist with landing provisions until 2 February, when they occupied the Palmiste heights east of the capital of Basseterre.

The French had positioned themselves in mountains to the north-east of the town. At dawn on 4 February the YLIV and the 1st West India Regiment's light company were sent to take the strategic Bridge of Voziere, over the Noire River, to the right of the French. They were spotted by a French picket but stormed the bridge anyway, capturing the position. With other British units having also crossed the river, heavily pushing the defenders back on the left, the French surrendered on 6 February. During this time the regiment continued to grow in numbers from its nadir of 1807, and in October 1810 was recorded at 1,290 men in twelve companies.

The regiment subsequently continued to expand, most likely because of heavy recruitment from French prisoners of war and because the majority of French troops who deserted to the British during the Peninsular War were sent to it; in 1811 the unit numbered 1,543 men. (Note: For example, in July 1810 560 deserters enlisted in the British Army, of which 205 went to the King's German Legion and 355 to the YLIV. The regiment was seen as an effective example of the implementation of French soldiers into the ranks of British units. When the 1st Independent Company of Foreigners was formed in August 1812, a sergeant major was sent back to Britain from the YLIV to assist the new unit.) In the same year the regiment was put back on garrison duty. Split in half, it was sent to Antigua and Barbados. In December 1814 the regiment was brought back together to serve in the British garrison in Jamaica. Lieutenant-Colonel Edward O'Hara assumed command on 15 June 1815, and left the unit on 25 July 1816. Still at Jamaica, the regiment was reduced in size in December, lowering to 1,077 men in ten companies. The regiment continued to be stationed in Jamaica until early 1817 when it was sent to England. The YLIV arrived at Harwich in March and was disbanded on the 19th of that month, by then being commanded by Lieutenant-Colonel Alexander Mackenzie.

== Uniform ==
The York Light Infantry Volunteers wore green uniforms with black facings and white crossbelts, based on that of the 95th Rifles. While green was the traditional colour of British rifle regiments, it was not exclusively worn by them. The collar, cuffs, and shoulder straps were black with white lace, with white metal buttons for the other ranks and silver for the officers. The uniform style was similar to that of the King's Dutch Brigade, with the blue-grey trousers of the latter being replaced with green. The regiment also had a morning parade dress uniform, which was white with black collars, shoulder straps and facings. Sashes worn for rank identification were crimson, but did not have the traditional stripe running through them in the colour of the unit's facings. YLIV troops wore a black stovepipe shako, likely with a bugle badge, until December 1813 when this was changed to the new "Belgic" shako. This later shako has been recorded as being white or brown by different sources. While the regiment was designated as light infantry, it carried drums rather than the more traditional bugle alongside its white accoutrements.

== Colonels of the Regiment ==
The following officers served as Colonel of the Regiment: (Note: Ranks and titles of officers are as held at the end of their tenures.)

Barbados Volunteer Emigrants

- 1803–1804: Colonel Fitzroy Maclean

York Light Infantry Volunteers

- 1804–1808: Major-General Sir Charles Green
- 1808–1809: Major-General Edwin Hewgill
- 1809–1815: Lieutenant-General Sir Alexander Campbell
- 1815–1816: Major-General Sir John Byng
