= Pomeroon =

Pomeroon can refer to either of the following:

- Pomeroon River, a river in Guyana;
- Pomeroon-Supenaam, a region in Guyana;
- Pomeroon (colony), a former colony in Guyana.
