= Invasion of Surinam (1804) =

Battle

- Part of the Caribbean campaign of 1803–1810
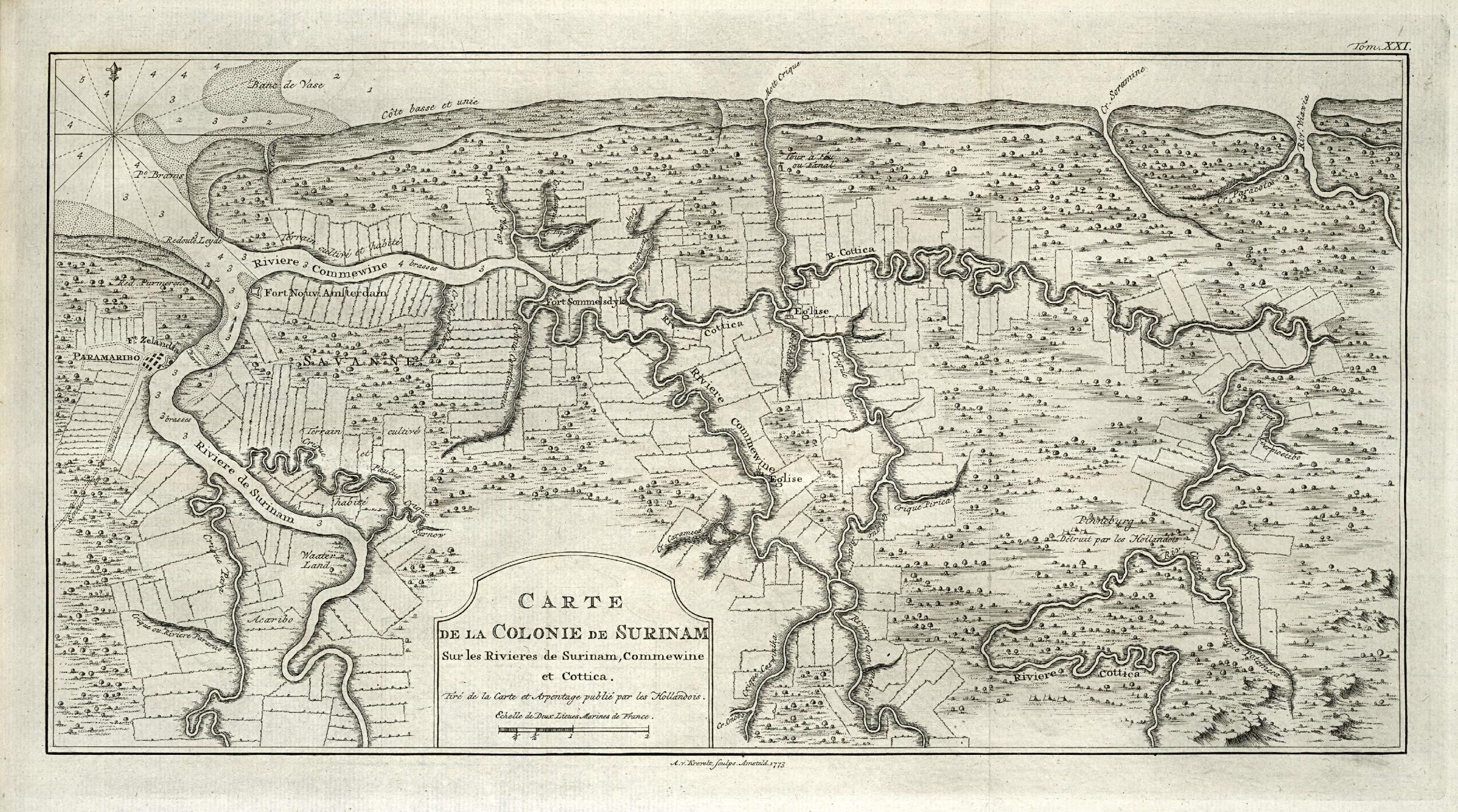
- 1773 map of Surinam
| Date | 25 April – 5 May 1804 |
| Location | Surinam, Dutch Guiana |
| Result | British victory |

Belligerents
| United Kingdom | Batavian Republic |

Commanders and leaders
| Samuel Hood; Sir Charles Green | Abraham Jacob van Imbijze van Batenburg |

Strength
| 2,000+ soldiers 31 ships | Unknown |

The invasion of Surinam was a British military campaign which resulted in the capture and occupation of the Dutch colony of Surinam in 1804 during the Napoleonic Wars. Surinam, defended by a weak Batavian garrison under the command of Abraham Jacob van Imbijze van Batenburg, was attacked by a British expeditionary force led by Samuel Hood and Sir Charles Green on 25 April. By 5 May, the British had captured the colony, and Green was appointed as the governor of Surinam.

== Background ==
In March 1804, the new Commander-in-Chief, Sir Charles Green, along with the 16th and 64th Regiments of Foot, arrived in Barbados from Britain, and plans were immediately made to capture the Dutch colony of Surinam from the Batavian Republic. The previous year, the Dutch colonies of Demarara, Essequibo and Berbice had been peacefully occupied and was believed that the inhabitants of Surinam were also amenable, though the colony's authorities were less so. The invasion force comprised a British squadron of 31 ships under the command of Samuel Hood, carrying 2,148 troops from 16 and 64 Regiments of Foot, the 60th Rifles, the York Light Infantry Volunteers, the 6th West Indies Regiment and the Royal Artillery.

The country's coastal waters were very shallow making any landing impossible except at the highest point of the tide, and the terrain was difficult to penetrate being covered in thick jungle that stretched down to the shoreline. By far the easiest method of travel was by boat along the rivers and creeks but even this was fraught with the danger of grounding because the waterways were also shallow and full of shoals. Additionally, the Batavians had built a series of fortifications along them. At the mouth of the Surinam estuary, at Braams Point, stood a battery of seven 18-pound guns while a distance upstream on the same bank, were the forts of Frederick, and a mile further on, Leyden, both with 12 large-calibre guns apiece. On the other side of the estuary, almost opposite Leyden was Fort Purmerend of 10 heavy guns. At the junction with the Commewine River, was Fort New Amsterdam, armed with 80 guns of various sizes and guarding Paramaribo itself, Fort Zeelandia, armed with 10 heavy guns. In order to secure the capital, the British would be required to make their way ten miles upstream past this series of well-constructed defences and any ship stranded on one of the numerous shoals would be helpless in the crossfire.

== Invasion ==
Sir Charles Green, who commanded the army contingent of the invasion force

The expedition arrived off Surinam on 25 April after a twenty-two-day journey. On 26 April, the sloop Hippomenes, a transport and a further three armed vessels, landed Brigadier-General Frederick Maitland and an advanced corps of over 600 men at Warapee Creek. Comprising men from 16th Foot, 64th Foot and 6th West India Regiment plus a battery of light artillery, the advanced corps had been ordered to make their way by water from their position, 30 miles east of the Surinam River, to the rear of Fort New Amsterdam. The same night, the captain of HMS Emerald, James O'Brien was ordered to assist Brigadier-General William Carlyon Hughes in the taking of Braam's Point. A sandbar initially prevented Emerald from entering the Surinam River but O'Brien forced her across on the rising tide, with Pandour and Drake following. Anchoring close by, the three British ships quickly put the Batavian battery of 18-pounders out of action. Soldiers from the 64th were then put ashore and captured the fort without loss of life. An invitation to surrender was then dispatched to the colony's governor.

On 28 April an unfavourable reply to Green’s summons was received but a plan to land soldiers for an attack on Fort Purmerend was thwarted by the low tide and marshes, and had to be abandoned. The expedition then pushed up the river, sometimes in water shallower than the frigates drew, until they arrived close to the forts Leyden and Frederick. A landing downstream was at first considered impossible due to the marshes and thick jungle but on 29 April the British learned of a path leading through the forest to the rear of forts.

Sometime after 22:00, a detachment of 180 men from the 64th and 6th West India regiments, under Hughes, was shown to the path by members of an indigenous tribe. Heavy rain had made the trail almost impassable but after a gruelling five-hour march undercover of the forests and swamps, Hughes and his men were able to launch a surprise attack that resulted in the capture of the two forts. By this time, most of the squadron had managed to work its way up the river as far as Fort Frederick, General Maitland was advancing along the Commewine River, and with troops poised to attack the fort of New Amsterdam, the Batavian commander, Lieutenant-Colonel Batenburg, duly surrendered.

== Aftermath ==
Following the capture, Green was made governor general of British Suriname. Shrapnel shells were used for the first time at the battle, after their creation by Major Henry Shrapnel in Newfoundland.

== Order of battle ==
=== Royal Navy ===
| Ship | Guns | Commander | Notes | Refs |
|---|---|---|---|---|
| Centaur | 74 | Commodore Samuel Hood; Captain Murray Maxwell | | |
| Pandour | 44 | Captain John Nash | Armed en flute | |
| Serapis | 44 | Commander Henry Waring | Armed en flute | |
| Alligator | 28 | Commander Charles Richardson | Armed en flute | |
| Hippomenes | 18 | Captain Conway Shipley | | |
| Drake | 16 | Commander William Ferris | | |
| Unique | 10 | Lieutenant George Rowley Brand | | |
| Guachapin | 14 | Commander Kenneth M'Kenzie | Ships boats only | |
| Emerald | 36 | Captain James O'Brien | | |

=== British Army ===
| Units | Commanders |
|---|---|
| 16th Regiment of Foot | Sir Charles Green; Frederick Maitland; William Carlyon Hughes |
| 64th Regiment of Foot | Sir Charles Green; Frederick Maitland; William Carlyon Hughes |
| 60th Regiment of Foot | Sir Charles Green; Frederick Maitland; William Carlyon Hughes |
| York Light Infantry Volunteers | Sir Charles Green; Frederick Maitland; William Carlyon Hughes |
| 6th West India Regiment | Sir Charles Green; Frederick Maitland; William Carlyon Hughes |
| Royal Artillery | Sir Charles Green; Frederick Maitland; William Carlyon Hughes |
