= Governor Maitland =

Governor Maitland may refer to:

- Frederick Maitland (1763–1848), Governor of Grenada from 1805 to 1811
- Peregrine Maitland (1777–1854), Governor of Nova Scotia from 1828 to 1834 and Governor of the Cape Colony from 1844 to 1847
- Thomas Maitland (British Army officer) (1760–1824), Governor of Ceylon from 1805 to 1811 and Governor of Malta from 1813 to 1824
