= Pomeroon (colony) =

Dutch colony in Guyana

Coordinates: 7.6167°N 58.7500°W

Kolonie Pomeroon Pomeroon
- 1581–ca.1596 (unofficial); 1650–1674; 1685–1689
- Flag Coat of arms

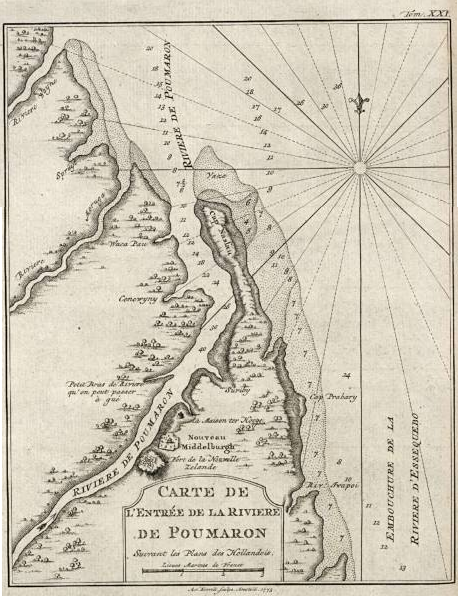
- The Pomeroon colony
- Status: Dutch colony
- Capital: New Middelburg
- Common languages: Dutch
- History
  - Established: 1650
  - Destroyed by French privateers: 1689
| Preceded by | Succeeded by |
| Indigenous peoples in Guyana | Essequibo (colony) |
- Today part of: Guyana

Pomeroon (also: Bouwerona) is the name of a former Dutch plantation colony on the Pomeroon River in the Guyana region on the north coast of South America. After early colonization attempts in the late 16th century were attacked by Spaniards and local Indians, the original inhabitants fled the interior of Guyana, founding the colony of Essequibo around Fort Kyk-Over-Al shortly after. A second, and more serious attempt at colonization started in 1650, but was ultimately unsuccessful, as French privateers destroyed the colony in 1689. In the late 18th century, a third attempt of colonization was started, this time under the jurisdiction of the Essequibo colony.

== History ==
On the banks of the Pomeroon River Dutch colonists from Zeeland established a trading post in 1581. This trading post was destroyed by local Indians and Spaniards around 1596. The colonists fled with their commander Joost van der Hooge to an island on the Essequibo River, and started the new Essequibo colony there.

A new, and more serious colonization attempt began in the 1650s, when under the command of the Dutch West India Company, plantations were set up on which African slaves were forced to work. A group of Jewish planters led by David Nassy briefly joined the colonists in 1658, however disagreements resulted in their departure the following year. A small town called Nieuw Middelburg was formed, and the fortress Nova Zeelandia was built to protect the small colony. In 1666, Pomeroon was occupied by the British causing most planters to flee. In 1667, the colony was returned, however French privateers were a serious menace to the small colony. In 1674 Pomeroon became part of the Dutch colony Essequibo.

In 1685, Jacob de Jong, a former owner, received permission to return to Pomeroon, however the French assaulted the colony in 1689 and destroyed it completely, the buildings and sugar-mills were burned and the slaves were taken away to French colonies. The plantations were not restored, and the colony was abandoned. On 15 November 1689, the colony was dissolved, and the territory given to Essequibo. Only a guard post with at least three soldiers remained.

By the end of the 18th century planters started developing plantations again on the banks of the Pomeroon. In 1796 the British conquered the colony Essequibo and Demerara, because the Netherlands had become allies of France. In 1802 at the Treaty of Amiens the colony was returned to the Dutch, It was reclaimed by the British the next year. At the London Convention of 1814 it was decided that Essequibo and Demerara (the Pomeroon River included) and Berbice had to be ceded to the United Kingdom, and they were made part of British Guiana in 1831. In 1980, the administrative regions of Guyana were restructured and Region 2 was named Pomeroon-Supenaam.

== Gallery ==
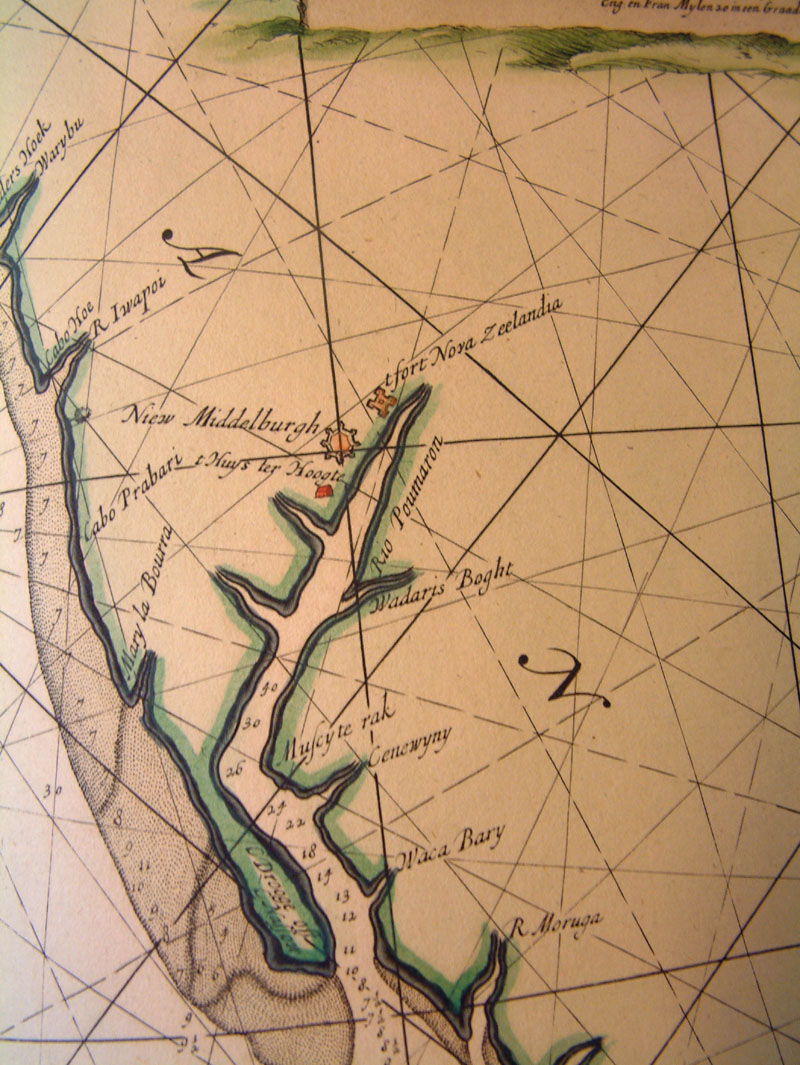
The Pomeroon colony in 1688, one year before its destruction by French privateers.

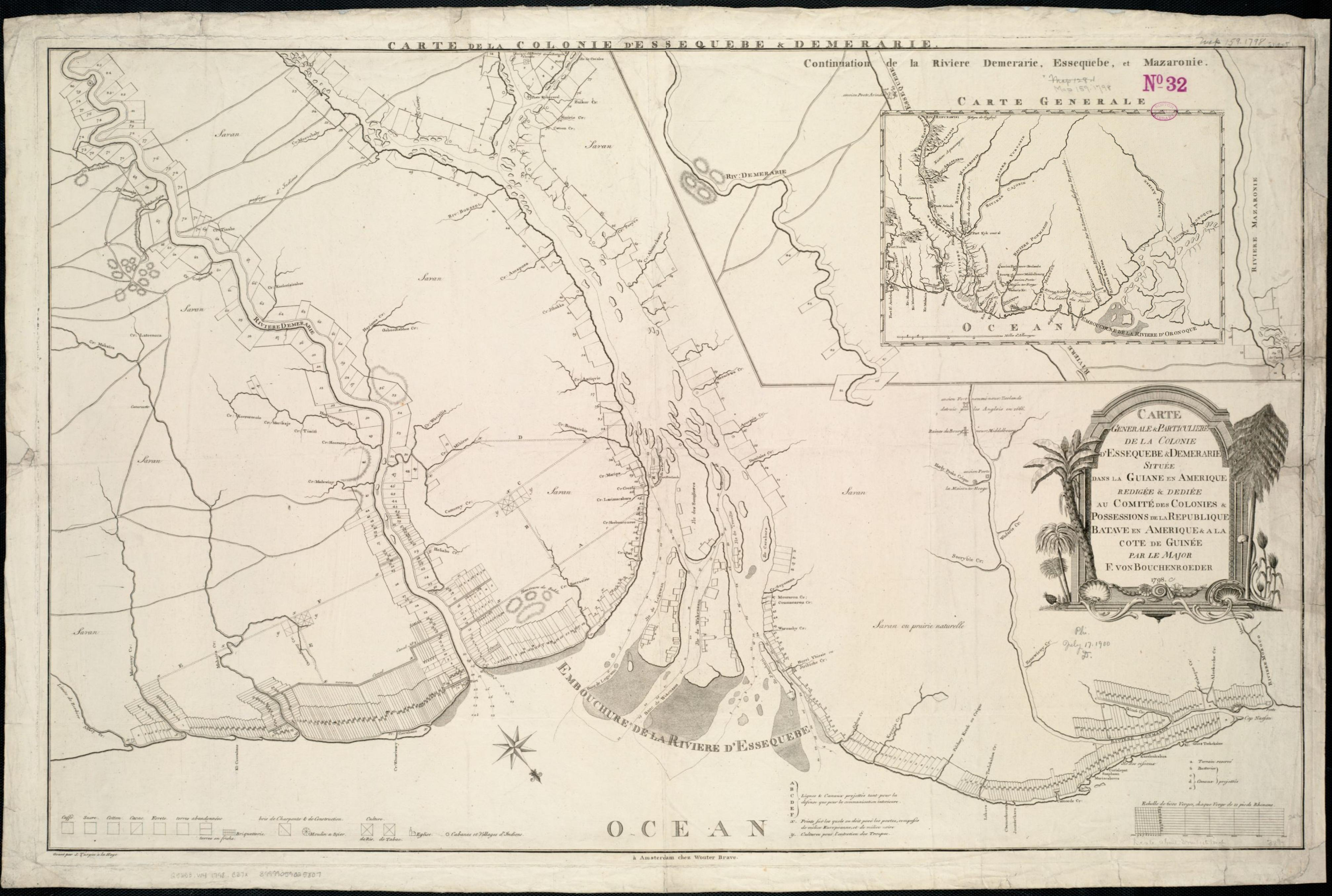
Map of Essequibo and Demerara in 1798. To the left one can see that the colonization of the Pomeroon river had resumed.
