= Sir Charles Green, 1st Baronet =

British Army officer and colonial administrator (1749–1831)

General Sir Charles Green Bt
- Portrait by Margaret Sarah Carpenter, 1815
- Born: 18 December 1749; Gibraltar
- Died: 12 July 1831 (aged 81); Cheltenham, Gloucestershire
- Military career
- Allegiance: Great Britain; United Kingdom
- Branch: British Army
- Service years: 1765–1831
- Rank: General
- Units: 31st Regiment of Foot; 30th Regiment of Foot
- Commands: York Light Infantry Volunteers; 16th Regiment of Foot; 37th Regiment of Foot; Northern District; London District
- Conflicts: American War of Independence; Battles of Saratoga (POW); French Revolutionary Wars; Invasion of Corsica (1794); Napoleonic Wars; Invasion of Surinam (1804)

General Sir Charles Green, 1st Baronet (18 December 1749 – 12 July 1831) was a British Army officer and colonial administrator who served as the governor of Grenada from 1797 to 1801.

== Life ==
Charles Green was born on 18 December 1749 in Gibraltar, the son of Captain Christopher Green of the British Army. In 1765 he was commissioned into the British army's 31st Regiment of Foot at the rank of ensign. Green served in the American War of Independence and was injured and taken prisoner by American forces at the Battles of Saratoga in September 1777.

In 1794, during the French Revolutionary Wars, Green led the 30th Regiment of Foot as its commanding officer and participated in the invasion of Corsica. He arrived in the British colony of Grenada on 9 March 1797 and subsequently became the colony's governor, succeeding the acting governor Alexander Houstoun. Green continued to serve as governor until 1801 when he was succeeded by Samuel Dent, and in 1803 was knighted by George III.

In 1804, during the Napoleonic Wars, he briefly served as commander-in-chief of the British troops in the Windward and Leeward Islands and was appointed as colonel of the York Light Infantry Volunteers; in the same year he commanded the army contingent of a British expeditionary force which captured the Dutch colony of Surinam in mid-1804.

Green was elevated to a baronetcy in 1805. He became commander-in-chief of British troops in Malta in 1807, colonel of the 16th Regiment of Foot in 1808, the general officer commanding of the Northern District in March 1812 and the general officer commanding London District in November 1813. In 1814 Green became the colonel of the 37th Regiment of Foot and was promoted to general on 12 August 1819. He died in Cheltenham, Gloucestershire on 12 July 1831.

Military offices
Preceded by William Grinfield	Commander-in-Chief Windward and Leeward Islands; 1804	Succeeded by Sir William Myers
Preceded by Sir David Dundas	GOC Northern District; 1812–1814	Succeeded by William Wynyard
New post	Colonel of the York Light Infantry Volunteers; 1804–1808	Succeeded by Edwin Hewgill
Preceded by Sir Charles Ross, Bt	Colonel of the 37th (North Hampshire) Regiment of Foot; 1814–1831	Succeeded by Hon. Sir Alexander Duff
Preceded by Henry Bowyer	Colonel of the 16th (Buckinghamshire) Regiment; 1808–1814	Succeeded by Sir George Prevost, Bt
Baronetage of the United Kingdom
New creation	Baronet (of Milnrow); 1805–1806	Extinct
Preceded by Muir-Mackenzie baronets	Green baronets of Milnrow; 5 December 1805	Succeeded by Prevost baronets
