= Banknotes of Demerary and Essequibo =

Known denomination set of Joes

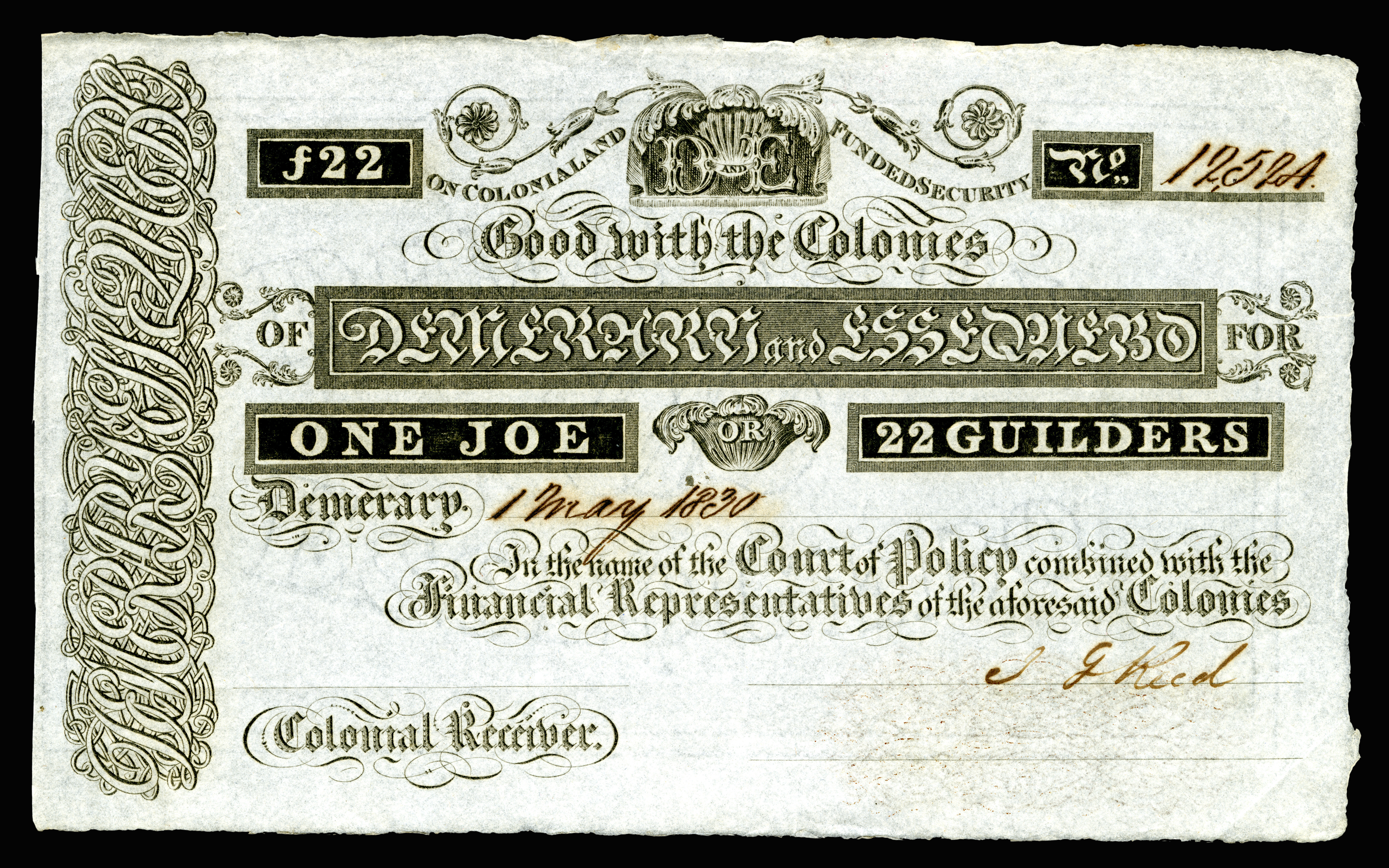
One Joe (22 Guilders)

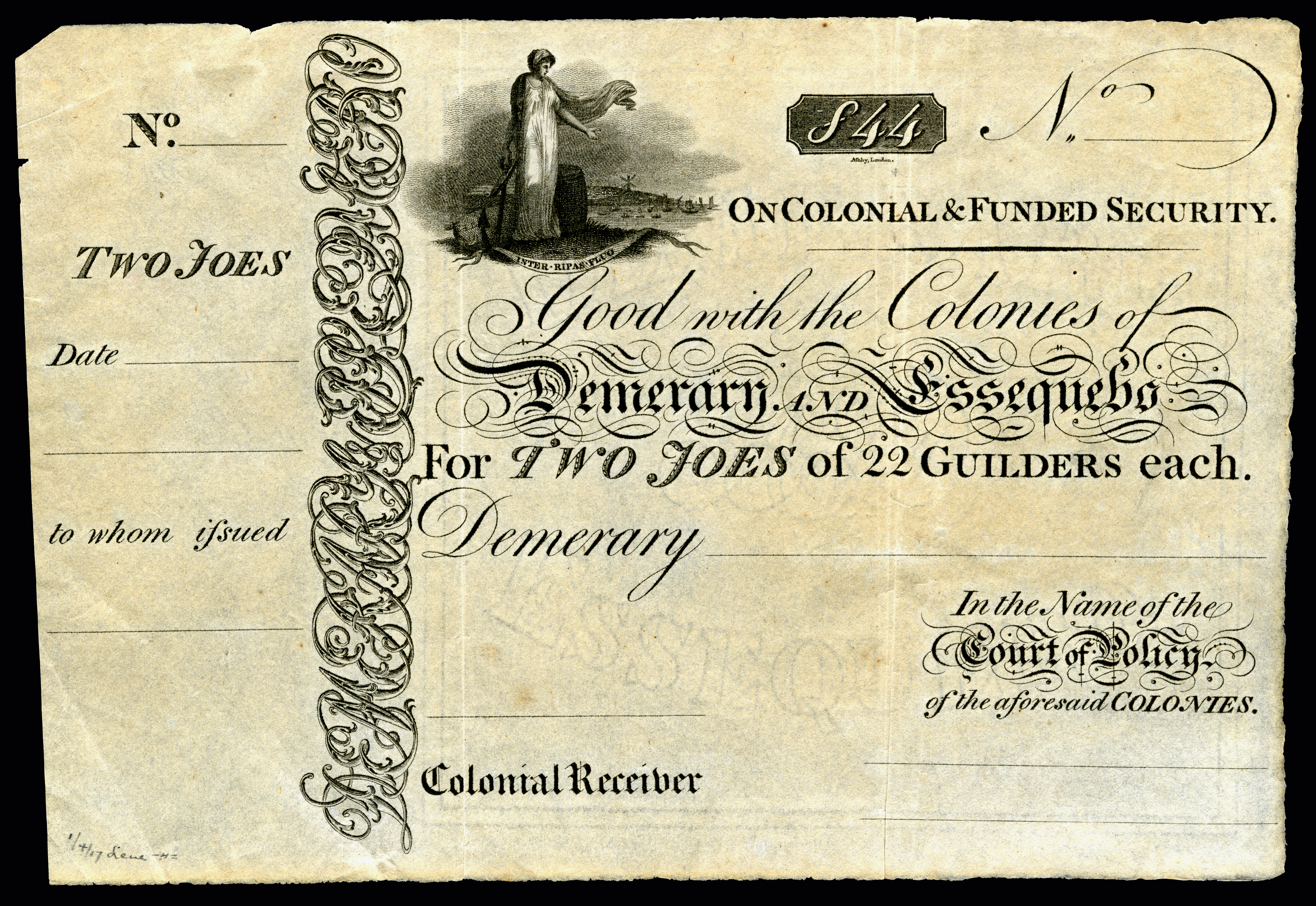
Two Joes (22 Guilders each)

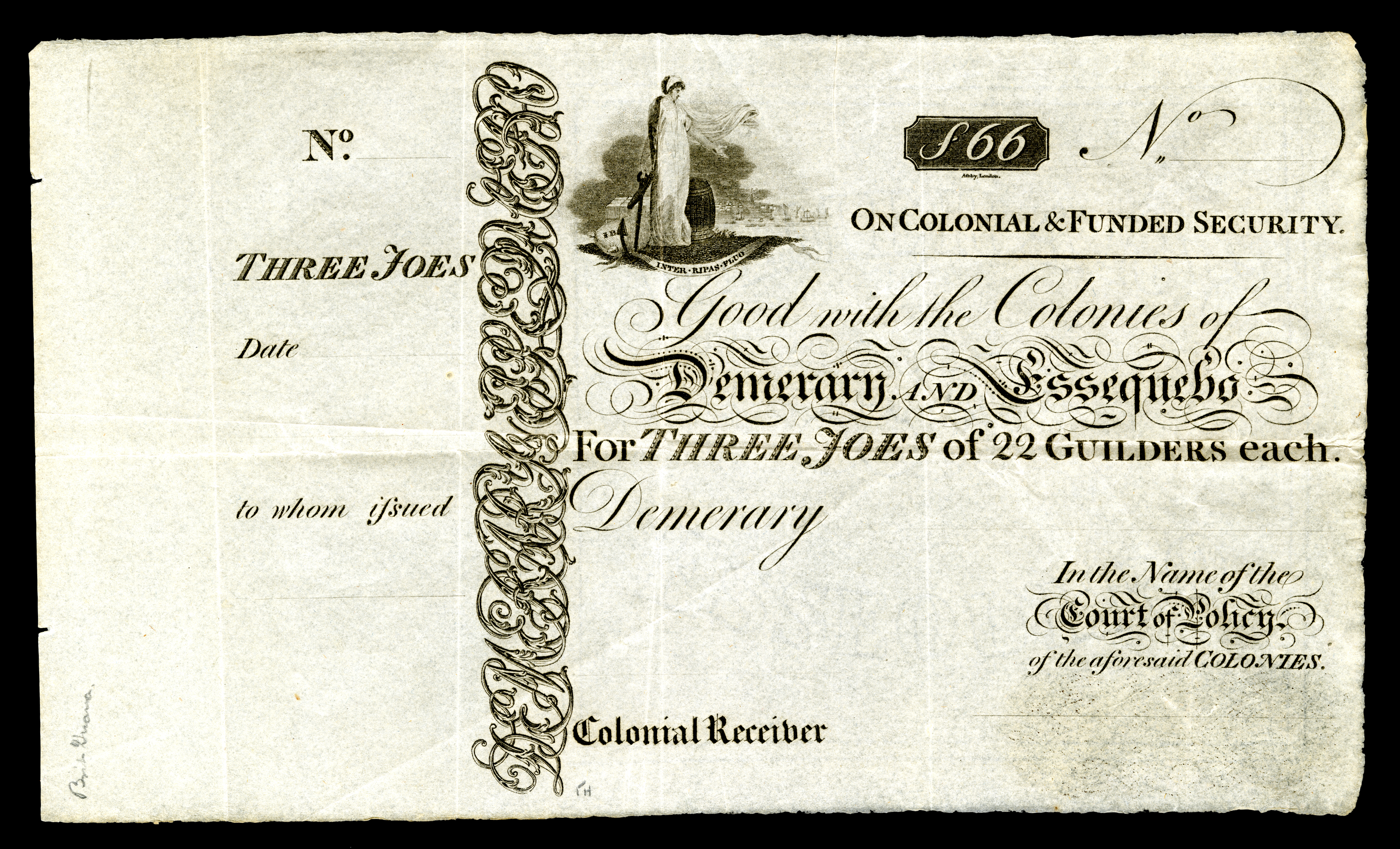
Three Joes (22 Guilders each)

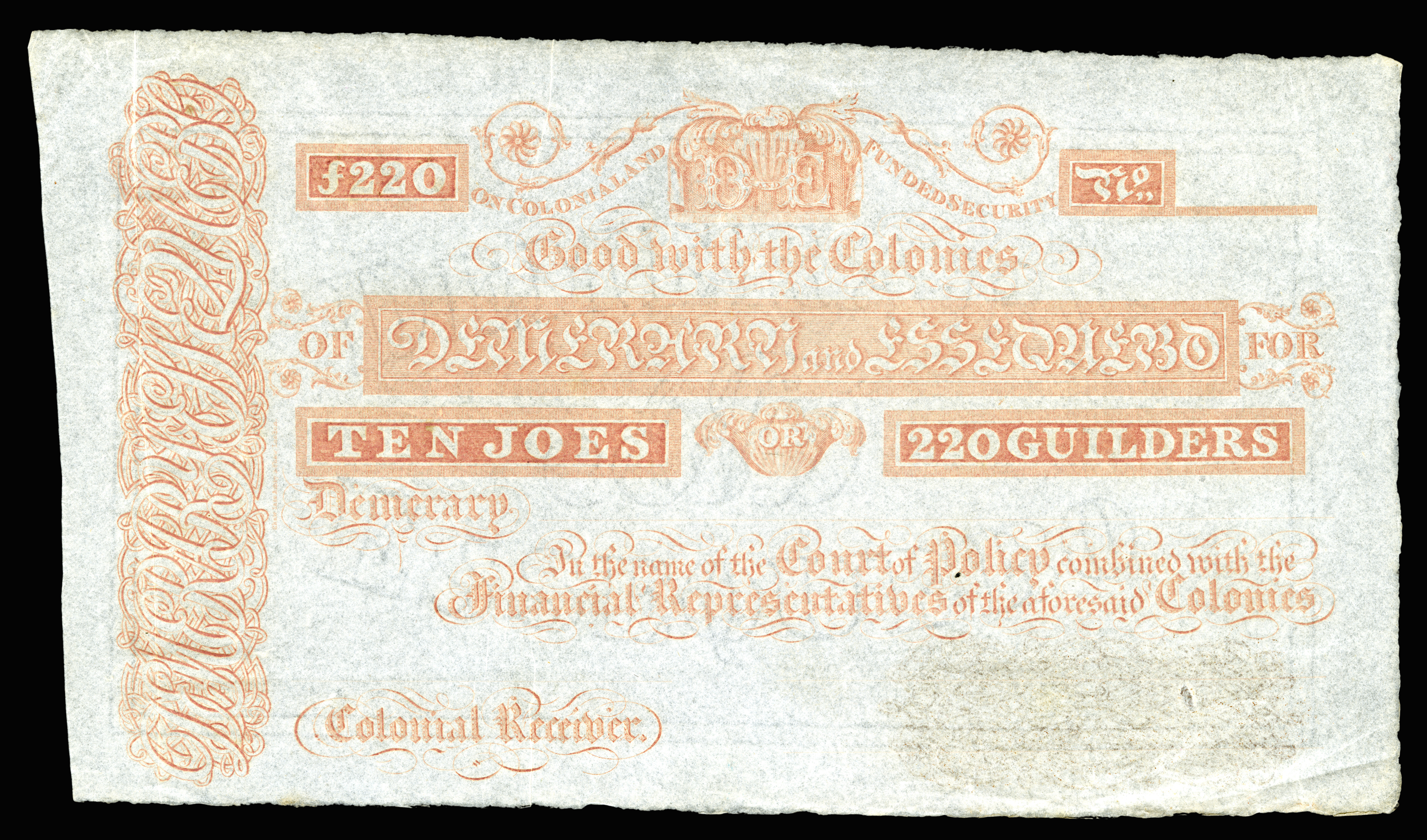
10 Joes (220 Guilders)

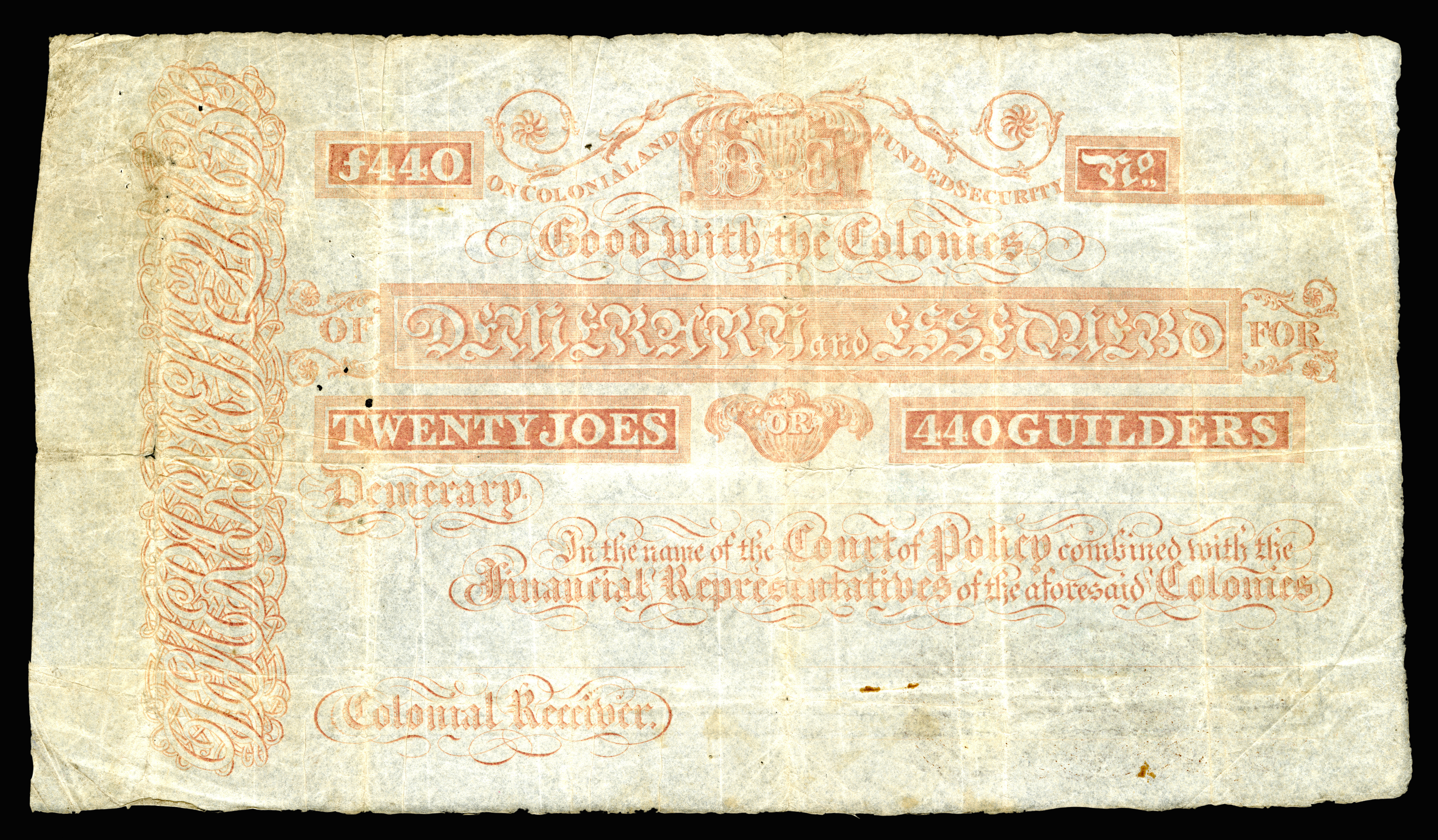
20 Joes (440 Guilders)

Banknotes of Demerara and Essequibo, issued from 1809 through 1839 were dual-denominated in Guilders and Joes, a term used by the British colonists to refer to the Portuguese gold Johannes coin and the notes that eventually replaced them. Despite roughly 30 years of use, the only Joes known to exist are unissued remainders from the 1830s.

== History ==
Dating back to at least 1798, the main unit of monetary exchange in the colonies of Demerara and Essequibo was the Portuguese gold Johannes coin which were valued at 22 Dutch guilders. Exchange rates in the United States in 1797 valued the Portuguese Johannes at $16 (the Spanish doubloon at $14.93, and the English silver shilling at $0.22). Due to clipping and boring (replaced with brass or copper) these coins (colloquially referred to as a Joe) began to lose their intrinsic value. An initial attempt was made to counterstamp or chop mark valid coins. Eventually (1809) the coins were recalled by the authorities and paper currency, denominated in both Guilders and Joes were issued.

== Issuance ==
The new paper issue of 1809 introduced 50,000 Joes equivalent to 1,100,000 guilders. This was followed by an additional 25,807 Joes in 1815–16, and 24,193 more in 1824 for a total circulation of just under 100,000 Joes. Deemed to be a legal tender, the notes were partially backed by securities in London, though their ability to be redeemed for gold was questionable.

By 1837, records indicate that 99,989 Joes had been issued in the following denominations: 1 Joe (13,258 notes), 2 Joes (8,189), 3 Joes (4,201), 5 Joes (3,150), 10 Joes (1,700), and 20 Joes (1,250). By 1839, there had been reference to a half-Joe.

== Currently known specimen ==
The Standard Catalog of World Paper Money lists only the unissued remainders of the 1830s. The two issues are distinguished by several design features including an ornate D-E in the upper center (first issue) or a woman with an anchor in the upper left (second issue). In addition, the wording of the denomination differs between the series. The first issue lists two denominations: 1 Joe or 22 Guilders and 10 Joes or 220 Guilders; the second issue lists four denominations: 1 Joe of 22 Guilders, 2 Joes of 22 Guilders each, 3 Joes of 22 Guilders each, and 10 Joes of 22 Guilders each. The illustrated 20 Joe note is a recent discovery (for the 1830s issue) in the National Numismatic Collection.
