= Fort Kyk-Over-Al =

- Part of Essequibo
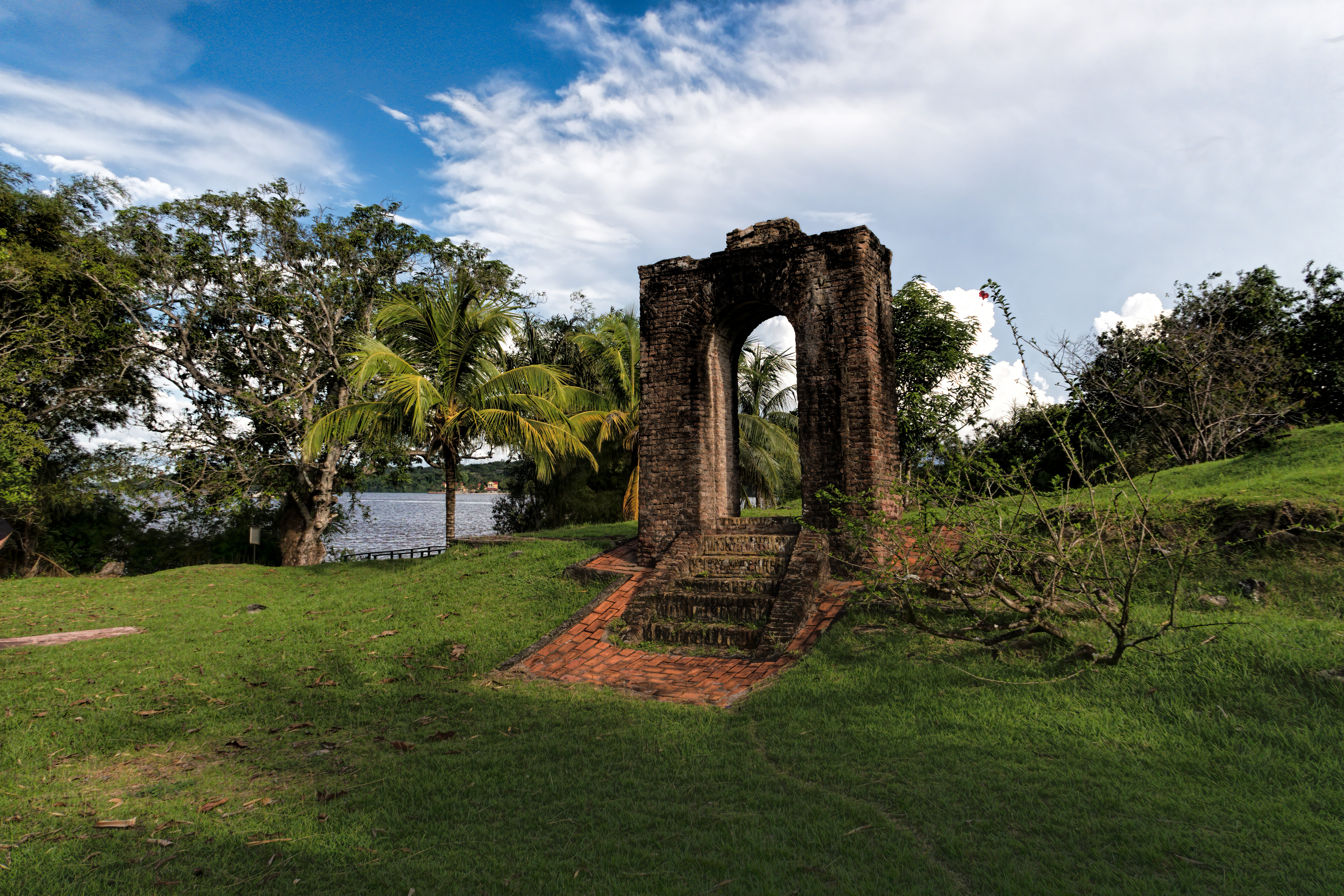
- Ruins of Fort Kyk-Over-Al

Location
- Coordinates: 6.378114°N 58.688822°W

Site history
- Built: 1616

Garrison information
- Occupants: Dutch Republic (1616-1795); Batavian Republic/Commonwealth (1795-1806); Kingdom of Holland (1806-1810); First French Empire (1810-1813); Sovereign Principality of the United Netherlands (1813-1815)

Fort Kyk-Over-Al was a Dutch fort in the colony of Essequibo, in what is now Guyana. It was constructed in 1616 at the intersection of the Essequibo, Cuyuni and Mazaruni rivers. It once served as the centre for the Dutch administration of the county, but now only ruins are left. The name Kyk-Over-Al derives from the Dutch for "See over all", a reference to the commanding view of the river from the fort.

== History ==
By 1672, Fort Kyk Over Al was described as a "two-storeyed brick structure approximately 20m x 20m, complete with a powder magazine inside the wall".

In 1716, the building became overcrowded and new buildings were constructed nearby. By 1748, the fort was completely abandoned, and the building was scavenged for new constructions.

The site became of interest in 1897 as a part of the Venezuelan crisis of 1895, when the remnants of the fort were claimed to be built by the Spanish. An archaeologist identified the brickwork to be Dutch.

On 20 July 1999, the building was designated a National Monument.
