= Jean Kina =

Jean Kina or Jean Quina (fl. 1790–1804) was a Haitian commander who fought in for the French and British during the Haitian Revolution. He was born a slave, but fought against the slave rebels during the revolution. After the British withdrew from Haiti he was eventually sent to Martinique where he led a brief uprising to defend enfranchisement rights.

== Early life ==
Jean Kina was born around the 1750s and was either born in Africa or in Saint-Domingue to parents from Africa. He worked as a carpenter on a cotton plantation near Tiburon. Guillaume, chevalier de Laroque-Turgeau, owned Kina. The parish assembly of Les Cayes used the name Jean Quina for him.

== Haitian Revolution ==
There were 4,000 slaves on the 90 estates across Tiburon compared to the white population of 550 and a free people of color population of 220. The Haitian Revolution broke out across the north in 1791, but slaves in southern areas like Tiburon initially did not participate. By the end of the year the conflict spread across all of the colony, but areas with small free nonwhite populations saw white resistance continue.

Slaves were recruited and armed by the end of 1791. Kina was placed in command by the local planters after 50 white people were killed in a mulatto ambush in February 1792. He led 60 armed slaves around the Tiburon River. He was praised for his maneuverability and outwitting a far larger force. The number of men he commanded grew to around 200 and these men were freed in 1793. Kina was regarded as an equal to Toussaint Louverture.

Kina was noted for his devotion to the white planters and was freed by Guillaume. His manumission was ratified by the governor and colonial assembly on 10 May, but Kina rejected this and wanted to remain a slave. A medal and pension of 300 livres were awarded to Kina by the colonial assembly in July 1792, but this pension was never paid out.

In 1792 and 1793, Governor Philibert François Rouxel de Blanchelande led an attack against Les Platons, a stronghold on a hill held by the rebels. Kina led 180 men in this battle, out of the total 1,900, and he was credited for the French victory. Kina personally led the attack against the camp of the rebel leader Martial Pemerle.

Tiburon was taken over by the mulattos in 1793, and they ordered that Kina's unit be dissolved and absorbed into André Rigaud's unit. Kina was able to prevent his men from being sent to Rigaud. The British arrived in the area on 20 September, and Kina defected to them. The British gave him the rank of colonel and many gifts, including a ceremonial sword and a portrait of King George III. Kina was wounded during the British capture of Tiburon.

Under the British the size of Kina's unit fluctuated between 200 and 500 men. Kina's military importance grew as British soldiers were killed by yellow fever. However, he suffered a fatal defeat when his men fled in panic during the French siege of Tiburon in December 1794 after a four-day bombardment. The size of Kina's unit fell while the Chasseurs-Volontaires de Saint-Domingue grew in size to 800.

Kina's ability to recruit was limited as he, unlike the Chasseurs, was not allowed to take from the plantations. The remaining men under Kina's command where sent to Port-au-Prince in 1795 while he was granted leave to Jamaica in order to recruit men from prison ships. Kina returned to Haiti with 60 men in June. and again in October, but the men he returned with in October were seized by Jean-Baptiste Lapointe, a mulatto commander for the British. In 1796, Kina was granted permission to purchase slaves to recruit into his unit and he purchase around 40 men from Jamaica. He commanded around 120 men by 1797.

The British withdrew from Haiti in 1798, and Kean sailed with his son from Môle-Saint-Nicolas to Jamaica on 1 October.

== Later life ==
After the evacuation of British forces from Saint Domingue, Kina visited London, where he met with officials in Whitehall and with French émigré planters. Pierre Victor Malouet attempted to enlist Kina in an abortive scheme to kidnap the adolescent sons of Louverture from a military boarding school in France.

In June 1800, the British sent Kina back to the Caribbean and considered sending him to lead a unit against maroons in Suriname. He and his son were sent to Martinique in September, but were rejected by Lieutenant-General Thomas Trigge. General John Knox requested Kina for Jamaica in order to conduct diplomacy with Louverture. However, permission from London was needed to approve this transfer and Kina was left in Martinique.

The government on Martinique passed laws restricting enfranchisement and threatened the free status of many nonwhites. Kina believed that the colonists were trying to sell free blacks into slavery. On 4 December 1800, Kina led 20 armed black and mulatto men from Fort Royal. This group went to multiple plantations and asked if they approved of British laws and how they treated their slaves. Some slaves were freed by Kina and the number of men under his command rose up to 70. British cavalry under Colonel Maitland found Kina's men and offered to investigate their grievances and to pardon them. Kina's men dispersed and he was taken to Fort Royal. Kina and his family were sent back to England a few weeks later. This pardon was confirmed by Governor William Keppel, but he was angered as the pardon prevented an investigation by a judicial inquiry from happening. He presented Kina's actions as a slave revolt in the style of Louverture in his dispatches.

On 9 March 1801, Kina was imprisoned in Newgate Prison under the Aliens Act 1793, but no charges were filed against him. The Aliens Act ceased to be in force after the Peace of Amiens and Kina was released in March 1802. Kina and his family moved to Paris, but their movement was without authorization and in violation of a new alien law. The Kina family was held at the Temple Prison before being sent to Besançon and then Fort de Joux. Louverture was also held Fort de Joux.

The local prefect came to the prison in June 1804, and was convinced by the Kinas to argue for their release. The Ministry of Justice sent the Kinas to the Armee d'Italie. This is the last recorded mention of the Kina family.

== Personal life ==
Kina manumitted his son Zamor in October 1797, and Zamor was made a captain by the British in January 1798. Kina attempted to marry Dauphine Guerin, the daughter of a free black from Port-au-Prince, but his rivals had him imprisoned and then beaten after his release. On 28 October 1800, he married the 14-year-old Felicite-Adelaide Quimard in Martinique.

Kina grew wealthy during the Haitian Revolution. The food bill for his family was 100 pistoles per month by 1793, and he bought a plot of land in Les Irois the same year. He started to receive a pension from the Administration de la Grand Anse in 1795. The will Kina created in 1798 included multiple slaves and hundreds of gourdes. A pension of £15 was given to Kina and Zamor after the end of the Haitian Revolution.

== Works cited ==
- Cormack, William (2019). Patriots, Royalists, and Terrorists in the West Indies: The French Revolution in Martinique and Guadeloupe, 1789-1802. University of Toronto Press. ISBN 9781487503956.
- Geggus, David (2002). Haitian Revolutionary Studies. Indiana University Press. ISBN 0253341043.
