= Abraham Jacob van Imbijze van Batenburg =

Governor of Berbice
- In office 1789 – 27 March 1802
- Preceded by: Peter Hendrik Koppiers
- Succeeded by: Robert Nicholson

Governor of Essequibo
- In office 22 April 1796 – 27 March 1802
- Preceded by: Robert Nicholson
- Succeeded by: George Hendrik Trotz

Governor of Berbice
- In office June 1804 – 1806
- Preceded by: Robert Nicholson
- Succeeded by: James Montgomery

Personal details
- Born: 1753 Breda, Dutch Republic
- Died: 9 October 1806 (aged 52–53) Barbados
- Spouse: Wilhelmina Suzanna Zurmegedé
- Occupation: governor

Abraham Jacob van Imbijze van Batenburg (1753 in Breda, Dutch Republic – 9 October 1806 in Barbados) was a Dutch governor of Berbice and Essequibo (Guyana) during the period 1789–1806.

== His life ==
Abraham Jacob was baptized on 17 June 1753 in the Walloon Church ("Waals Gereformeerd") in Breda, as the son of Johan Bernhard Imbyze van Batenburg (bef. 1723–1768) and Susanna de Wit (1723-).

His father Johan Bernhard Imbijze van Batenburg was a draughtsman of maps, military-engineer (1743) and captain (1760). His grandfather was probably Paschasius Diederick van Batenburgh.

He was married 1782 in Tilburg, Netherlands with Wilhelmina Suzanna Zurmegedé. She was born on 21 April 1759 in Veere, (Netherlands), possibly as daughter of Hendrik Cornelis Zurmegede, free citizen of Batavia, Dutch East Indies, and Susanna Lints.

In Berbice (Guyana) they had nine children: Suzanna Maria (1784-?), Hendrik Christiaan (1786-?), Adriana Baldwina (1788-?), Jan Jacob Hendrik (1788-?), Lambert Abraham (1791 in Java (Dutch East-Indies - 1829), Catharina Cordelia (1793-?), Elizabeth (1796–1864), Henriette Maria (1797-?) and Hendrika Maria (1801-?).

Alternative names are: van Imbijze van Batenburg and Imbyse van Batenburg,

== Positions ==
Initially active until 1791 for the Dutch East India Company, he was from 1796 on in service for the British government and the Batavian Republic (1795–1806). Imbyze van Batenburg was governor of:

- Berbice (Guyana) (between 1789 and 27 March 1802)
- Essequibo (Guyana) (between 22 April 1796 and 27 March 1802)
- Berbice (between June 1804 and 1806).

== Sources ==
- https://www.vanbatenborgh.nl/documents/downloads/familie%20overzicht%20Van%20Imbyze%20van%20Batenburg.pdf
