= Frederick Maitland =

British Army general (1763–1848)

General Frederick Maitland
- Born: 3 September 1763
- Died: 27 January 1848, age 84; Tunbridge Wells
- Spouse: Catherine Prettijohn (m. 1790–1848)
- Children: Nine
- Relatives: Sir Alexander Maitland (father)
- Military career
- Allegiance: United Kingdom
- Branch: British Army
- Service years: 1779–1848
- Rank: General
- Commands: 27th Regiment of Foot; 29th Regiment of Foot; Lieutenant-Governor of Grenada; Lieutenant-Governor of Dominica
- Conflicts: American Revolutionary War; Relief of Gibraltar; French Revolutionary War; West Indies campaign (1793–1798); Capture of Tobago; Battle of Martinique; Invasion of Guadeloupe; Capture of St Lucia; Second Carib War; Battle of San Juan; Flanders campaign; Relief of Nieuport and Ostend; Anglo-Russian invasion of Holland; Napoleonic Wars; West Indies campaign (1803–1810); Battle of Suriname; Invasion of the Danish West Indies; Invasion of Martinique; Peninsular War

General Frederick Maitland (3 September 1763 – 27 January 1848) was a British Army officer who fought during the American War of Independence, the Peninsular War and later served as Lieutenant Governor of Dominica.

== Life ==
The youngest son of Sir Alexander Maitland and Penelope, daughter of Colonel Martin Madan and Judith Madan the poet, he was also the grandson of Charles Maitland, 6th Earl of Lauderdale and first cousin of Rear Admiral Frederick Lewis Maitland (1779–1837).

In 1779, the age of sixteen, Maitland joined the 14th regiment, serving as a Marine on HMS Union at the Great Siege of Gibraltar in 1781. He subsequently served in the West Indies on the staff of the quarter master-general, General Cuyler. He was promoted from Ensign to Brevet Major and also served as aide-de-camp to Sir Charles Grey at the relief of Nieuport on the Dutch coast in 1793.

Maitland was engaged in two naval actions during this period; the first in 1793 involving the sloop Fairy (18 guns, commanded by Captain later Admiral John Laforey), in which Maitland commanded the Marines, in an engagement with a French 32-gun frigate, which escaped. The second, in 1797, involved the frigate Arethusa (38 guns, commanded by Captain Woolley), and Maitland commanded the cabin guns of the frigate at the capture of the French corvette, La Gaieté.

In 1795 Maitland was appointed secretary to General Sir Ralph Abercromby and travelled with him to the West Indies. While serving in Martinique, he was instrumental in the bloodless resolution of the rebellion of Jean Kina and later argued against punishment for any of Kina's men.

Maitland was appointed quartermaster general in the West Indies in 1800, with the brevet rank of Colonel. He commanded a brigade at the capture of St Bartholemew, St Thomas, St Martin, and Santa Cruz in 1801. He was also second in command at the taking of Surinam in 1804. In 1805 Maitland was appointed Governor of Grenada at the express command of George III. In 1807 he saw further action during the recapture of St Thomas and Santa Cruz which had been returned after the Treaty of Amiens in 1802. Coincidentally, Maitland received the surrender of St Thomas from Van Schogen, the same Dutch Governor he had captured the island from in 1801. In 1809 he commanded a brigade during the Invasion of Martinique. In recognition of his services, Maitland was appointed Lieutenant Governor of Dominica in 1813.

He married Catherine, daughter of John Prettyjohn of Barbados. They had nine children, but only three survived him. These were Harriet (1801–1850), who married Donald Maclean, Colonel Frederick Thomas Maitland (1807–1882), and Charlotte Garth (1799–1868), who married Captain Thomas Garth RN of Haines Hill in Berkshire.

Maitland died at Tunbridge Wells on 27 January 1848.

Government offices
Preceded by William Douglas MacLean Clephane	Lieutenant Governors of Grenada acting 29 March 1805–1811	Succeeded by Abraham Charles Adye
Military offices
Preceded by Sir Kenneth Douglas, 1st Baronet	Colonel of the 58th (Rutlandshire) Regiment of Foot; 1833–1848	Succeeded by George Charles D'Aguilar
