= Essequibo (colony) =

1616–1803 Dutch colony in South America

Coordinates: 7°02′N 58°27′W

Kolonie Essequebo (before 1803) Colony of Essequibo (1803–1812) County of Essequibo (1838–1958) Essequibo
- 1616–1812; 1838–1958
- Flag (1616–1792) Flag (1803–1831)

- Dutch Essequibo in 1800
- Status: Colony of the Dutch West India Company (1621–1792); Dutch colony (1792–1815) (Note: After 1803 it was a de jure Dutch colony but was a de facto British colony. Dutch Republic (1792–1795) Batavian Republic/Commonwealth (1795–1806) Kingdom of Holland (1806–1810) First French Empire (1810–1813) Sovereign Principality of the United Netherlands (1813–1815) United Kingdom of the Netherlands (1815)); British occupation (1781–1782; 1796–1802; 1803–1815) (Note: Great Britain (1781–1800) United Kingdom of Great Britain and Ireland (1800–1802)); French occupation (1782–1783); De facto Colony of the United Kingdom (1803–1812); Combined with Demerara as a de facto Colony of the United Kingdom (1812–1815); Combined with Demerara as a Colony of the United Kingdom (1815–1831); County of British Guiana (1838–1958)
- Capital: Fort Kyk-Over-Al (1616–1739); Fort Zeelandia (1739–1803)
- Common languages: Dutch, Skepi Creole Dutch, English, Guyanese Creole, Guyanese Hindustani, Tamil, South Asian languages, African languages, Akawaio, Macushi, Waiwai, Arawakan, Patamona, Warrau, Carib, Wapishana, Arekuna, Portuguese, Spanish, French, Chinese
- Religion: Christianity, Hinduism, Islam, Judaism, Afro-American religions, Traditional African religions, Indigenous religions
- Governor
  - 1616–24: Adrian Groenewegen
  - 1796–1802: Abraham Jacob van Imbijze van Batenburg
- History
  - Commencement of building Fort Kyk-Over-Al: 1616
  - Established as a Dutch West India Company colony: 1621
  - Raid on Essequibo and Demerara: 24–27 February 1781
  - Capture of Demerara and Essequibo: 22 January 1782
  - Peace of Paris: 1783
  - Colony of the Dutch Republic: 1 January 1792
  - Treaty of Amiens: 27 March 1802
  - Joined with Demerara to form Demerara-Essequibo: 28 April 1812
  - Anglo-Dutch Treaty of 1814: 20 November 1815
  - Demerara-Essequibo merges with Berbice to become British Guiana: 21 July 1831
  - County of Essequibo: 1838
  - Merged into the new regions: 1958
- Currency: Spanish dollar, Dutch guilder, British Guiana dollar, British West Indies dollar
| Preceded by | Succeeded by |
| Pomeroon (colony) | Demerara; Demerara-Essequibo |
- Today part of: Guyana

Essequibo (/ˌɛsəˈkwiːboʊ/ ESS-ə-KWEE-boh; Dutch: Kolonie Essequebo [koːˈloːni ɛsəˈkʋeːboː]) was a Dutch colony in the Guianas and later a county on the Essequibo River in the Guiana region on the north coast of South America. It was a colony of the Dutch West India Company between 1616 and 1792 and a colony of the Dutch state from 1792 until 1815. It was merged with Demerara in 1812 by the British who took control. It formally became a British colony in 1815 until Demerara-Essequibo was merged with Berbice to form the colony of British Guiana in 1831. In 1838, it became a county of British Guiana till 1958. In 1966, British Guiana gained independence as Guyana and in 1970 it became a republic as the Co-operative Republic of Guyana. It was located around the lower course of the Essequibo River.

== History ==
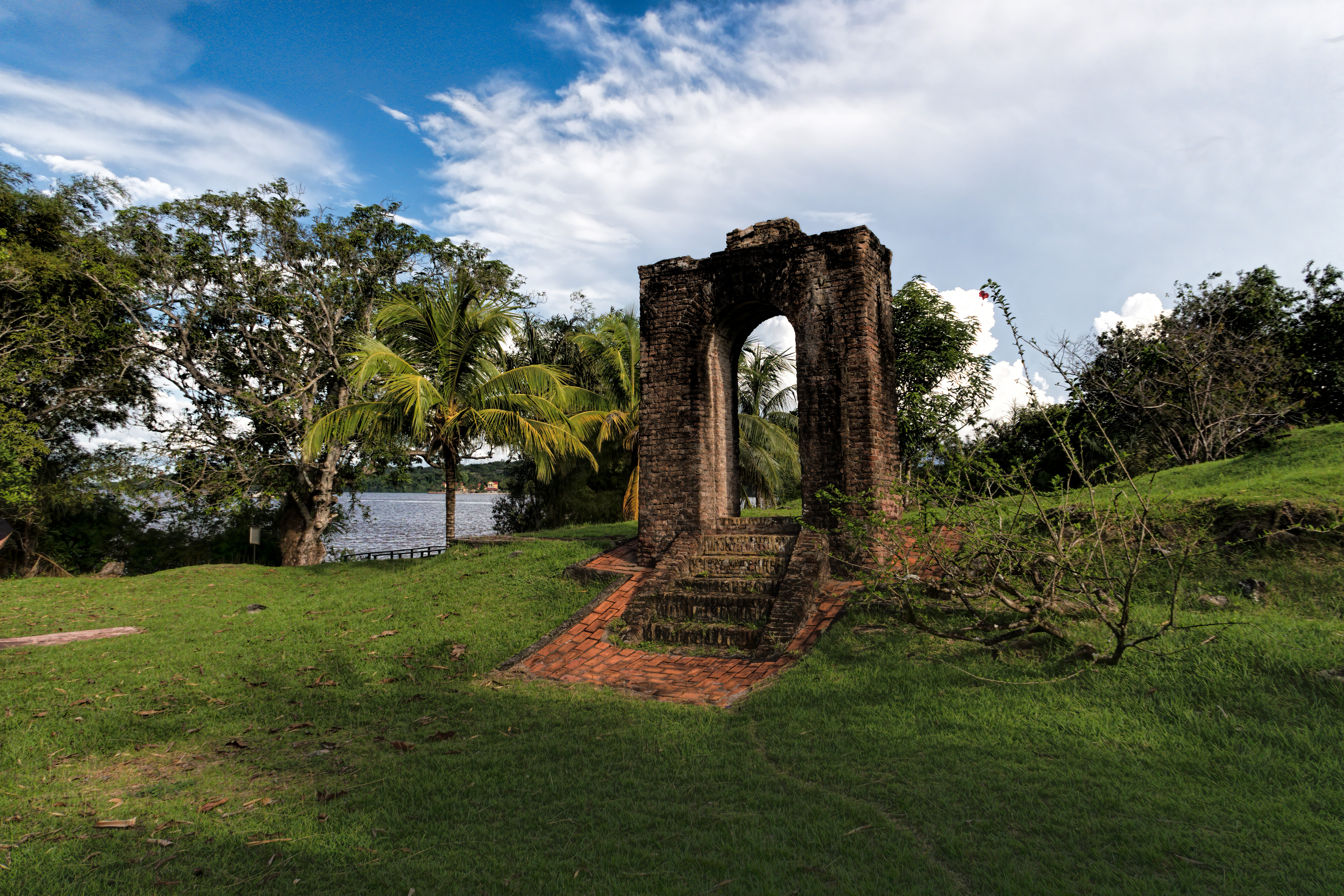
The ruins of Fort Kyk-Over-Al, which was constructed in 1616

Essequibo was founded by colonists from the first Zeelandic colony, or trading post, Pomeroon founded in 1581, which had been destroyed by Spaniards and local warriors around 1596. Led by Joost van der Hooge, the Zeelanders founded Fort Kyk-Over-Al in the Essequibo river (actually a side-river called the Mazaruni). This location was chosen because of its strategic location and the trade with the local population. Van der Hooge encountered an older ruined Portuguese fort there (the Portuguese arms had been hewn into the rock above the gate). Using funds of the West Indian Company (WIC), van der Hooge built a new fort called "Fort Ter Hoogen" from 1616 to 1621, though the fort quickly became known amongst the inhabitants as Fort Kyk-Over-Al (English: Fort See-everywhere). The administration of the West Indian Company as well as the governor of the entire colony settled here in 1621.

Initially, the colony was named Nova Zeelandia (New Zeeland), but the usage of the name Essequibo soon became common. On the southern shore of the river the hamlet Cartabo was built, containing 12 to 15 houses. Around the river, plantations were created where slaves cultivated cotton, indigo and cacao. Somewhat further downstream, on Forteiland or "Great Flag Island", Fort Zeelandia was built. From 1624 the area was permanently inhabited and from 1632, together with Pomeroon, it was put under the jurisdiction of the Zeelandic Chamber of the WIC (West Indian Company). In 1657 the region was transferred by the Chamber to the cities of Middelburg, Veere and Vlissingen, who established the "Direction of the New Colony on Isekepe" there. From then on Pomeroon was called 'Nova Zeelandia'.

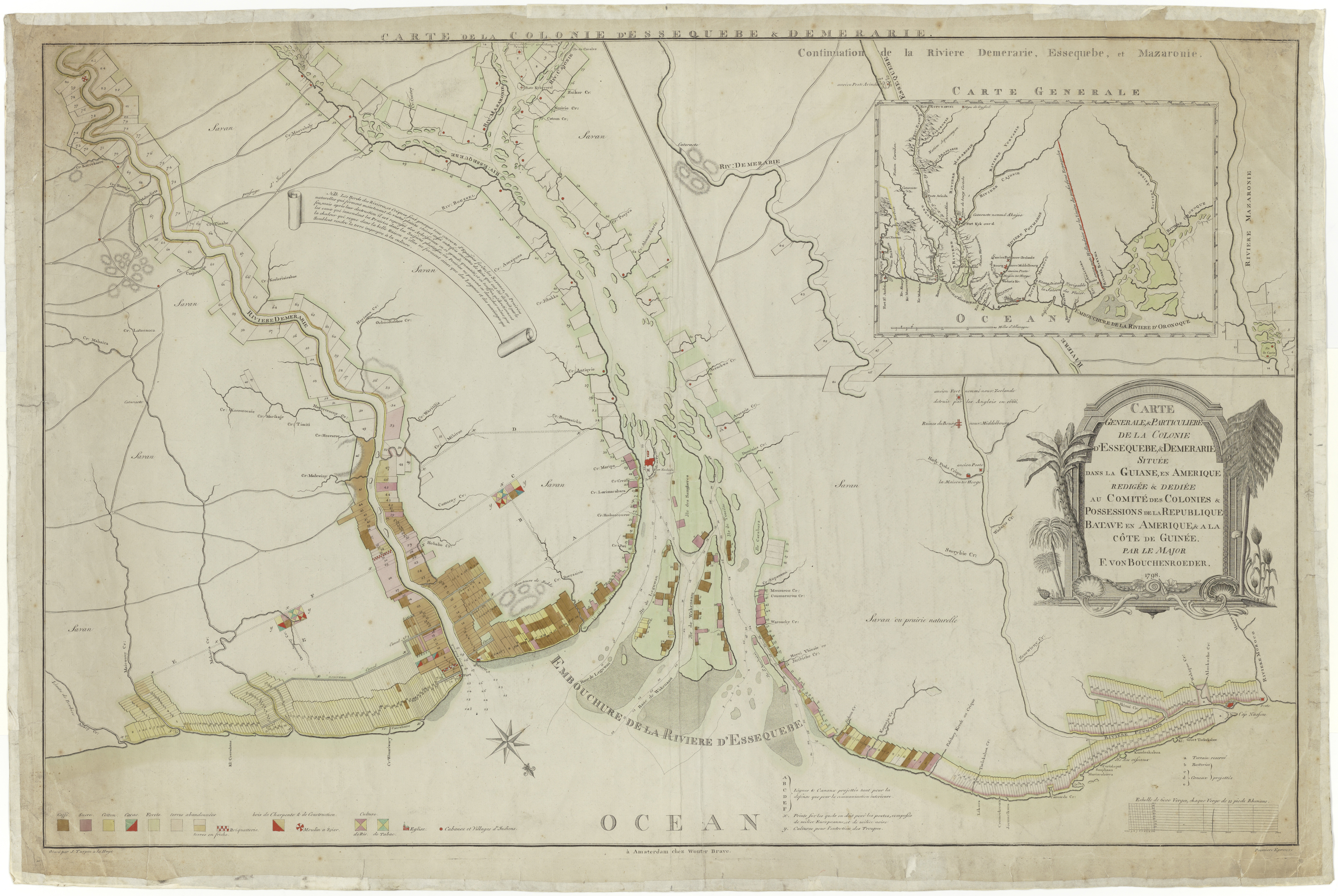
Essequibo and Demerara in 1798.

In 1658, cartographer Cornelis Goliath created a map of the colony, planned to build a new city, and built a fortress there called "New Middelburg", but the Second Anglo-Dutch War (1665–1667) put an end to these plans. Essequibo was occupied by the British in 1665 (along with all other Dutch colonies in the Guianas), and then plundered by the French. The following years the Zeelanders sent a squadron of ships to retake the area. In 1667 Surinam (English colony) to the east was captured from the English by Abraham Crijnssen, and by then abandoned Essequibo was occupied by Matthys Bergenaar. In 1670 the Chamber of the WIC in Zeeland took over control of the colonies again. The Dutch colonies in the region endured much suffering as a result of the Nine Years' War (1688–1697) and the Spanish Succession War (1701–1714), which brought pirates into the region. In 1689 Pomeroon was destroyed by French pirates, and abandoned.

The Chamber of the WIC in Zeeland kept control over the colonies, which sometimes led to criticism from The Chamber of the WIC in Amsterdam, who also wanted to start plantation there. The Zeelanders however, had established the colony by themselves, and after they retook possession of Essequibo under command of the commander of Fort Nassau Bergen in 1666, they considered themselves as rightful rulers of the region. Under governor Laurens Storm van 's Gravesande, English planters started coming to the colony after 1740.

After 1745, the number of plantations along the Demerara and her side-rivers rapidly increased. Particularly, British colonists from Barbados began settling here. After 1750 a commander of the British population was assigned, giving them their own representation. Around 1780 a small central settlement was established at the mouth of the Demerara, which received the name Stabroek in 1784, named after one of the directors of the West Indian Company. In 1781, the annual production of the Essequibo and Demerara colonies was 10,000 okshoofden (2.3 megalitre) of sugar, 5 million ponden (2.5 gigagram) coffee, and 800,000 ponden (395 megagram) cotton.

In 1771, Prince William V revoked the rights of the Zeelanders who traded on Essequibo, Demerary and Berbice. In response, 185 Middelburg merchants invested 320,000 guilders in the newly established Society for Navigation on Essequibo and adjacent Rivers. Partly due to the damage inflicted during the Fourth Anglo-Dutch War (1780–1784), this trading company was already liquidated in 1788.

A group of British privateers captured Essequibo and Demerara on 24 February 1781, but did not stay. In March, two sloops of a Royal Navy squadron under Admiral Lord Rodney accepted the surrender of "Colony of Demarary and the River Essequebo". From 27 February 1782 to February 1783 the French occupied the colony after compelling Governor Robert Kinston to surrender. The peace of Paris, which occurred in 1783 restored these territories to the Dutch.

In 1796 it was permanently occupied by the British and by 1800, Essequibo and Demerara collectively held around 380 sugarcane plantations.

=== Border disputes ===
At the Peace of Amiens (1802), the Netherlands received the Essequibo colony for a short time, from 1802 to 1803, but after that the British again occupied it during the Napoleonic Wars. In 1812 Stabroek was renamed by the British as Georgetown. Essequibo became official British territory on 13 August 1814 as part of the Treaty of London and was merged with the colony of Demerara.

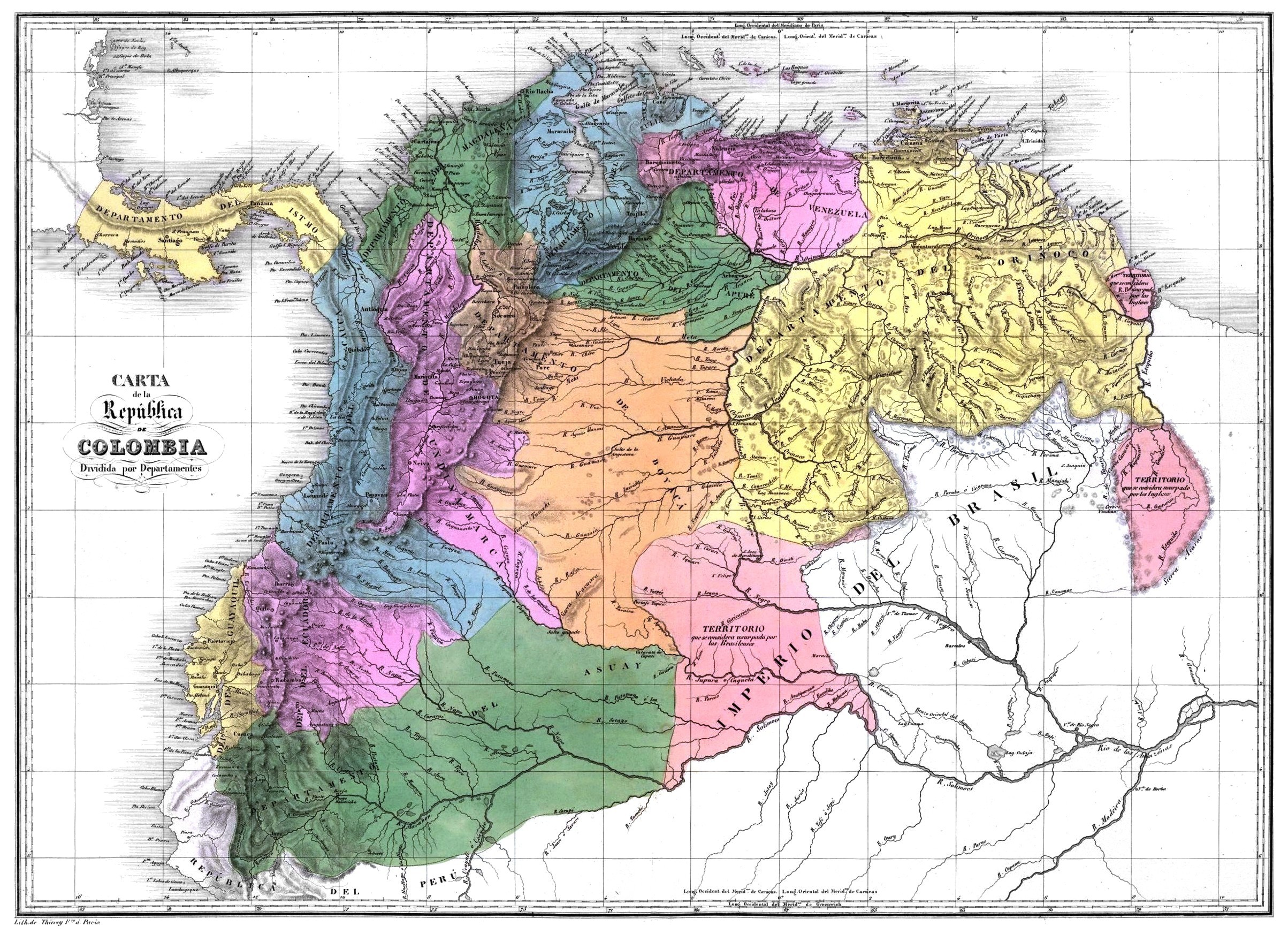
An 1840 map of Gran Colombia, including the Essequibo border.

But it also became involved in one of Latin America's most persistent border disputes because the new colony had the Essequibo river as its west border with the Spanish Captaincy General of Venezuela. Although Spain still claimed the region, the Spanish did not contest the treaty because they were preoccupied with their own colonies' struggles for independence. On 21 July 1831, Demerara-Essequibo was united with Berbice to create British Guiana with the Essequibo River as its west border, although many British settlers lived west of the Essequibo.

In 1835 the British government asked German explorer Robert Hermann Schomburgk to map British Guiana and mark its boundaries. As ordered by the British authorities, Schomburgk began British Guiana's western boundary with the new Republic of Venezuela at the mouths of the Orinoco River, although all the Venezuelan maps showed the Essequibo river as the east border of the country. A map of the British colony was published in 1840. Venezuela did not accept the Schomburgk Line, which placed the entire Cuyuni River basin within the colony. Venezuela protested, claiming the entire area west of the Essequibo River. Negotiations between Britain and Venezuela over the boundary began, but the two nations could reach no compromise. In 1838, Essequibo was made one of the three counties of Guiana, the other two being Berbice and Demerara. In 1850 both countries agreed not to occupy the disputed zone.

The discovery of gold in the contested area in the late 1850s reignited the dispute. British settlers moved into the region and the British Guiana Mining Company was formed to mine the deposits. Over the years, Venezuela made repeated protests and proposed arbitration, but the British government was uninterested. Venezuela finally broke diplomatic relations with Britain in 1887 and appealed to the United States for help. The British prime minister Lord Salisbury at first rebuffed the United States government's suggestion of arbitration, but when President Grover Cleveland threatened to intervene according to the Monroe Doctrine, Britain agreed to let an international tribunal arbitrate the boundary in 1897.

For two years, the tribunal consisting of two Britons, two Americans, and a Russian studied the case in Paris (France). Their unanimous decision, handed down in 1899, awarded 94 percent of the disputed territory to British Guiana. Venezuela received only the mouths of the Orinoco River and a short stretch of the Atlantic coastline just to the east. Although Venezuela was unhappy with the decision, a commission surveyed a new border in accordance with the award, and both sides accepted the boundary in 1905. The issue was considered settled for the next half-century.

In 1958, the county of Essequibo was abolished when Guiana was subdivided into districts. Historical Essequibo was divided in 1958, and is part of a number of Guyanese administrative regions and the name is preserved in the regions of Essequibo Islands-West Demerara and Upper Takutu-Upper Essequibo.

In 1962, under UN policy of decolonisation, Venezuela renewed its 19th-century claim, alleging that the arbitral award was invalid. In 1949, the US jurist Otto Schoenrich, a named partner in the New York law firm Curtis, Mallet-Prevost, Colt & Mosle, gave the Venezuelan government a memorandum written by Severo Mallet-Prevost, the Official Secretary of the US–Venezuela delegation in the Tribunal of Arbitration, which was written in 1944 to be published only after his death. Mallet-Prevost surmised from the private behaviour of the judges that there had a political deal between Russia and Britain, and said that the Russian chair of the panel, Friedrich Martens, had visited Britain with the two British arbitrators in the summer of 1899, and subsequently had offered the two American judges a choice between accepting a unanimous award along the lines ultimately agreed, or a 3 to 2 majority opinion even more favourable to the British.

The alternative would have followed the Schomburgk Line entirely, and given the mouth of the Orinoco to the British. Mallet-Prevost said that the American judges and Venezuelan counsel were disgusted at the situation and considered the 3 to 2 option with a strongly worded minority opinion, but ultimately went along with Martens to avoid depriving Venezuela of even more territory. This memorandum provided a motive for Venezuela's contentions that there had in fact been a political deal between the British judges and the Russian judge at the Arbitral Tribunal, and led to Venezuela's revival of its claim to the disputed territory. The British Government rejected this claim, asserting the validity of the 1899 award. The British Guiana Government, then under the leadership of the PPP, also strongly rejected this claim. Efforts by all the parties to resolve the matter on the eve of Guyana's independence in 1966 failed. As of today the dispute remains unresolved.

== Governors ==
=== Governors of Essequibo ===
- Adrian Groenewegen (1616–1624)
- Jacob Conijn (1624–1627)
- Jan van der Goes (1627–1638)
- Cornelis Pieterszoon Hose (1638–1641)
- Andriaen van der Woestijne (1641–1644)
- Andriaen Janszoon (1644–16..)
- Aert Adriaenszoon Groenewegel (1657–1664)
- John Scott (1665–1666)
- Abraham Crijnssen (1666)
- Adriaen Groenewegel (1666)
- Baerland (1667–1770)
- Hendrik Bol (1670–1676)
- Jacob Hars (1676–1678)
- Abraham Beekman (1678–1690)
- Samuel Beekman (2 November 1690 – 10 December 1707)
- Peter van der Heyden Resen (10 December 1707 – 24 July 1719)
- Laurens de Heere (24 July 1719 – 12 October 1729)
- Hermanus Gelskerke (d. 1742) (12 October 1729 – April 1742)
- Laurens Storm van 's Gravesande (d. 1775) (April 1743 – 1750)
- Robert Nicholson (27 February 1781 – 1782)
- Abraham Jacob van Imbijze van Batenburg (22 April 1796 – 27 March 1802)

=== Directors-general ===
- Laurens Storm van 's Gravesande (1752 – 2 November 1772)
- George Hendrik Trotz (2 November 1772 – 1781)

=== Commanders of Essequibo ===
- Albert Siraut des Touches (1784)
- Johannes Cornelis Bert (1784–1787)
- Albertus Backer (1st time) (1787–1789)
- Gustaaf Eduard Meijerhelm (1789–1791)
- Matthijs Thierens (1791–1793)
- Albertus Backer (2nd time) (1793 – 22 April 1796)
- George Hendrik Trotz (27 March 1802 – September 1803)

=== Lieutenant governors of Demerara and Essequibo ===
- Robert Nicholson (September 1803 – 18 August 1804)
- Antony Beaujon (18 August 1804 – 17 October 1805)
- James Montgomery (acting) (19 October 1805 – 8 May 1806)
- Henry William Bentinck (*1765 – †1821) (8 May 1806 – February 1812)
- Hugh Lyle Carmichael (*1764 – †1813) (February 1812 – 11 May 1813)
- E. Codd (acting) (11 May 1813 – 23 May 1813)
- John Murray (23 May 1813 – 26 April 1824)
- Sir Benjamin d'Urban (26 April 1824 – 21 July 1831)

== See also ==
- History of Guyana
- Banknotes of Demerary and Essequibo
