= Railways in Guyana =

The Railways of Guyana comprised two public railways, the Demerara-Berbice Railway and the Demerara-Essequibo Railway. There are also several industrial railways mainly for the bauxite industry. The Demerara-Berbice Railway is the oldest in South America. None of the railways are in operation in the 21st century.

== Demerara-Berbice railway ==
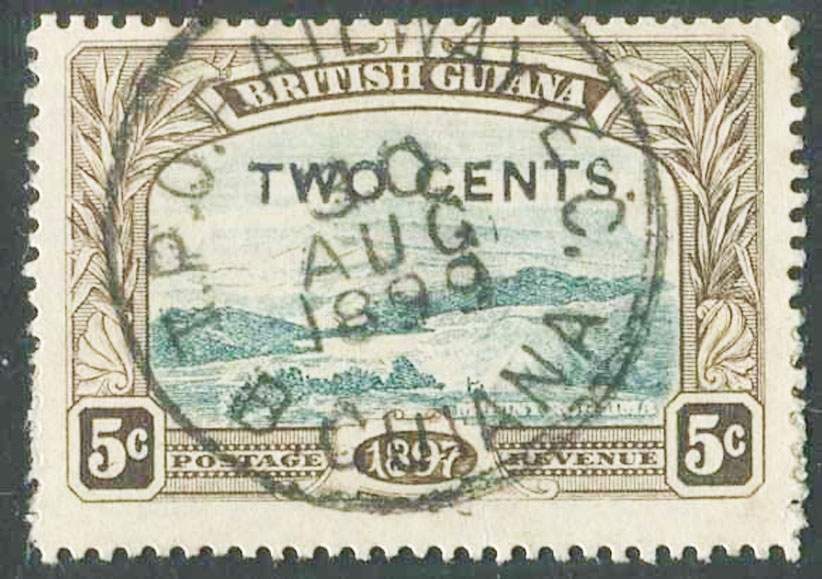
Stamp of 1899 depicting Mount Roraima with a Travelling Post Office cancellation of the East Coast Railway

The Demerara-Berbice Railway, built in then British Guiana (now Guyana), was the first railway system in South America. It ran from Georgetown in Demerara to Rosignol in Berbice.

=== History ===
The bill proposing the construction of the railway was passed in July 1846. The railway was designed, surveyed and built by the British-American architect and artist Frederick Catherwood. All the railway stations, bridges, stores and other facilities were constructed by John Bradshaw Sharples. Financing was provided by the Demerera Sugar Company who wished to transport their product to the dock of Georgetown. Construction was in sections with the first, from Georgetown to Plaisance, opening on 3 November 1848. The opening day's festivities featured the death of one of the railway's directors by being run over by the locomotive.

An extension to Belfield was completed in 1854, to Mahaica in 1864 and finally to Rosignol during 1897–1900.

In 1948 the railway system in Bermuda was dismantled and sold 'lock, stock & barrel' to the government of British Guiana (as the country then was) to rejuvenate the former system. The locomotives (petrol or diesel [just 2]) and coaches were fully restored, the latter being painted dark green. In 1953 the public lines in the colony carried 1,772,954 passengers and 92,769 tonnes of freight. A bold plan to extend the railway south to Brazil was never proceeded with.

The public railway system was dismantled in stages by then President Forbes Burnham, and closed in 1972.

=== Service ===
Following the opening in 1848, there were two return trains per day between Georgetown and Plaisance.

In 1922 there was one train each week day, departing Georgetown at 08:00 and returning in the evening.

The Georgetown-Rosignol railway service ended in 1972.

==== Infrastructure ====
There were three major bridges on the line, all constructed of steel, across the Mahaica, Mahaicony and Abary Rivers.

There were 17 stations on the Demerara-Berbice Railway:

- Georgetown
- Bel Air
- Plaisance
- Beterverwagting
- Buxton
- Nonpareil
- Enmore
- Golden Grove
- Belfield
- Clonbrook
- Mahaica
- de Kinderen
- Mahaicony
- Belladrum
- Lichfield
- Fort Wellington
- Rosignol

=== Rolling stock ===
In 1936, the Colonial Transport Department owned 16 locomotives, 39 coaches and 283 goods wagons.

==== Locomotives ====
Acquired	Disposed	Name	Number	Cost	Use	Notes
1847		Mosquito				
1847		Sandfly				
1847		Firefly				
1863		Alexandra		£1,593	Relief engine	
1863	1921	Victoria		£1,593		
1924		Sir Wilfred	30			
1924		Sir Graeme	31			
1946		Sir Gordon	34			
1946		Sir John	35			

== Demerara-Essequibo railway ==
=== Route ===
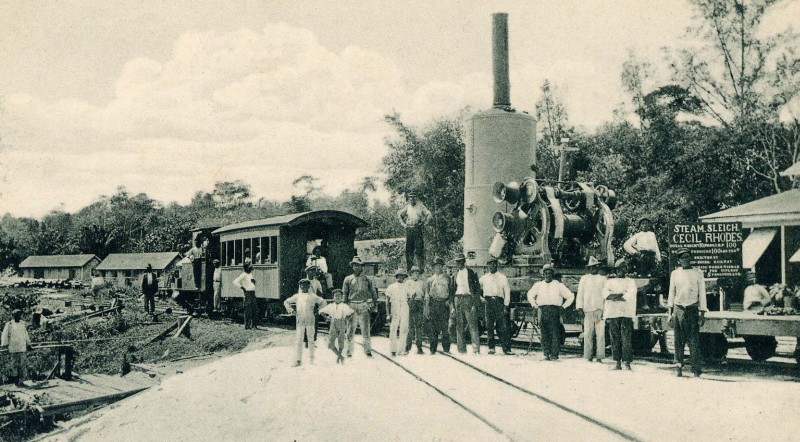
'Steam Slide Cecil Rhodes' at the Demerara Essequibo Railway near Wismar on the Demerara River

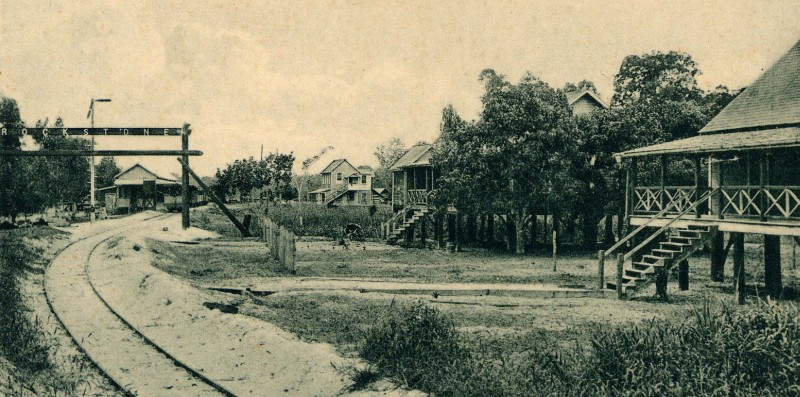
Rockstone River Terminus of the Demerara Essequibo Railway on the Essequibo River

Guyana's second railway, the Demerara-Essequibo Railway, was 3ft 6ins (1067mm) gauge and ran for 29.8 km (18.5 mi) along the West Coast of Demerara from Vreed en Hoop on the left bank of the Demerara River to Parika on the Essequibo River.

=== History ===
Its first section was laid from Vreed-en-Hoop to Greenwich Park c1899 and it was extended to Parika in 1914.

The Demerara-Essequibo railway service ended in 1974.

=== Service ===
In 1922 there were three return trains each day, timed to interconnect with arriving and departing steam ferries.

=== Infrastructure ===
By 1974 there were eight railway stations along the Demerara-Essequibo line:

- Vreed-en-Hoop
- Windsor Forest
- Hague
- de Kinderen
- Tuschen
- Vergenoegen
- Greenwich Park
- Parika

There were sidings to the sugar factories of Leonora and Uitvlugt.

A number of minor stops, called platforms, were located between the stations, e.g., at Crane, Blankenberg, Den Amstel, Cornelia Ida, Stewartville, De Willem, Farm.

There was one railway bridge of steel construction across the Boeraserie River.

== Industrial railways ==
The industrial railway systems continued to operate following the closure of the public system and included several at bauxite mining sites and another linking Port Kaituma and Matthew's Ridge in the Northwest District.

In 1897, a 29.8-kilometre (18.5 mi) 1,000 mm (3 ft 3 3/8 in) (metre gauge) industrial railway was built between Rockstone and Wismar (nowadays called Linden) across the watershed between the Demerara and Essequibo Rivers. The Essequibo River was hard to navigate, but the Demerara River was suitable for ocean-going ships. The railway line gave access to the gold fields, balatá and hardwood plantations. In 1936, the company owned 14 locomotives and 272 goods wagons. The railway was closed in the 1940s.

== Bibliography ==
- The British Guiana Government Railways, article Railway Magazine January 1964
- The Old Railway Station, Lamaha Street, Cummingsburg, National Trust of Guyana.
- UK Directorate of Overseas Surveys 1:500,000 map of Guyana NE sheet, 1972.
- History of the British Guiana Railway System – Georgetown to Mahaica, Part 1, Shammane Joseph, Stabroek News, 2008-12-25.
- History of the British Guiana Railway System – Georgetown to Mahaica, Part 2, Shammane Joseph, Stabroek News, 2009-02-12.
- History of the British Guiana Railway System – Georgetown to Mahaica, Part 4, Stabroek News, 2009-07-09.
- History of the British Guiana Railway System – Georgetown to Mahaica, Part 5, Shammane Joseph, Stabroek News, 2009-11-07.

== See also ==
- Transport in Guyana
