= List of massacres in Guyana =

The following is a list of massacres that have occurred in Guyana (numbers may be approximate):

Name	Date	Location	Deaths	Notes
Killing the Enmore Martyrs	June 16, 1948	Enmore Sugar Estate, East Coast Demerara	5	Disciplined forces opened fire on sugar workers protesting conditions in the Sugar industry.
Wismar Massacre	May 26, 1964	Wismar	5	Members of the majority Afro-Guyanese population attacked the Indo-Guyanese minority. In addition, to the murders, there were also rapes and incidents of arson.
Son Chapman Bombing	July 6, 1964	Hurudaia, Demerara	43	Unknown persons placed a bomb on board the Son Chapman launch.
Jonestown massacre	November 18, 1978	Jonestown, Georgetown, & Port Kaituma	918	A mass suicide, led by American Jim Jones, over 900 killed by consuming cyanide.
Buxton Massacre	December 9, 1994	Buxton, East Coast Demerara	6	A known drug addict murdered his mother and five other villagers, before being killed by police officers.
Eccles-Agricola Massacre	February 26, 2006	Eccles and Agricola, East Bank Demerara	7	Armed gunmen blocked the road, and carried out an hour long assault on the residents of Eccles and Argricola
Lusignan Massacre	January 26, 2008	Lusignan	11	Gang broke into multiple homes, connected to the Bartica Massacre.
Bartica massacre	February 17, 2008	Bartica, Essequibo	12	Gang killed three police before killing nine others in the town.
Lindo Creek Massacre	June 21, 2008	Lindo Creek, Berbice	8	The charred bodies, bearing gunshot wounds, were discovered by the campsite owner.
Mackenzie/Wismar Bridge Massacre	July 18, 2012	Linden, Demerara	3	Three people were killed by police officers, when the police opened fired on prostestors against a recent increase in electricity rates.
Georgetown prison riot	March 3, 2016	Georgetown	17	Inmates at the Georgetown Prison, rioted and burnt down part of the facility. 17 inmates were killed and several prison officers and prisoners were injured
Mahdia school fire	May 21, 2023	Mahdia, Potaro-Siparun	20	A 15-year-old student set fire to a school in Mahdia, causing 19 deaths and 29 injuries. It was the first massacre to occur at a school in Guyana.
