= Victoria, Guyana =

Village in Demerara-Mahaica, Guyana

Victoria
- Village
- Location in Guyana
- Coordinates: 6.7510°N 57.9661°W
- Country: Guyana
- Region: Demerara-Mahaica

Population (2012)
  - Total: 2,912
- Time zone: UTC-4
- Climate: Af

Victoria is located on the Atlantic coast of Guyana, 29 kilometres (18 mi) east of Georgetown and bordered by Cove and John to the west and Belfield to the east. It was the first village in Guyana to be bought by the combined resources of Africans who had recently won their freedom from slavery. The village is often also claimed to be the first African village that was bought by freed slaves from the trans-Atlantic slave trade.

== History ==
The community was initially established as a plantation called Fort Wellington. In November 1839, 83 ex-slaves from five nearby estates (Douchfour, Ann's Grove, Hope, Paradise and Enmore) came together and bought Plantation Northbrook for 30,000 guilders, or $10,283.63. Each of the 83 owned one lot of land. After its purchase it was renamed Victoria, presumably in honor of England's Queen Victoria, although some suggest it may have been named as such in honor of the freed slaves' victory.

It is credited with one of the first codes of local government in Guyana, established in 1845. The village grew up to become one of the leading exporters of products made from coconuts and cassava.

Pioneering Guyanese playwright, Bertram Charles was born in Victoria and in 1963, organized a series of Creole Breakfasts in order to stimulate artistic and cultural life in the area. .

William Nicholas Arno's History of Victoria Village gives an account of the origins and development of the village.

== Notes ==
- Guyana Jottings
- The Village Movement Chapter 54
- Article from Guyana Tribune, reprinted at Land of Six Peoples
