= Lusignan massacre =

2008 massacre in Guyana

Coordinates: 6.792893°N 58.044561°W

The Lusignan massacre refers to the murder of eleven residents of Lusignan, East Coast Demerara, Guyana, on 26 January 2008. The victims were murdered by a group led by Rondell "Fineman" Rawlins. After carrying out another massacre when they attacked the town of Bartica, Essequibo, and murdered 12 people, Rawlins and many of the other suspected gang members were later killed by Guyanese security forces. This massacre was part of a series of murders which appeared to have begun with the murder of a prison officer, Troy Williams, during the Mash Day Prison break on 23 February 2003.

== Events ==
On the morning of Saturday, 26 January 2008, gunmen stormed into the small village of Lusignan, Guyana, and murdered eleven people, including five children and six adults. Five families were affected by the massacre. The gunmen armed with shotguns and AK-47s entered Lusignan around 2:00am and invaded the homes of five Lusignan families. Within 20 minutes eleven people were murdered. The victims were: Clarence Thomas, 48; Vanessa Thomas, 12; Ron Thomas, 11; Mohandan Goordat, 32; Seegopaul Harilall, 10; Seegobin Harilall, 4; Dhanwajie Ramsingh, 52; Seecharran Rooplall, 56; Raywattie Ramsingh, 11; Shazam Mohammed, 22; and Shaleem Baksh, 52. Several of the murdered children were found dead while still in their beds. Survivors of the attack were Arjune Bhim, 11, Roberto Thomas and Howard Thomas. Both Roberto and Howard, who sustained life-threatening gunshot wounds, have successfully recovered.

=== Aftermath ===
As the country experienced nationwide mourning, East Coast residents held protests along the East Coast corridor, where they burned tires and damaged state infrastructure. Residents reported that they had made several attempts to contact the Vigilance Police Station during the siege, but the police did not respond promptly, and arrived at the crime scene long after the gunmen had escaped. Angry residents staged protests to vent their disappointment with the country's fractured national security and were also incensed when government officials visited Lusignan.

=== Mastermind and motive ===
The former soldier, Rondell “Fineman” Rawlins, who claimed responsibility for the massacre, was initially wanted for the April 2006 assassination of the Agriculture Minister, Satyadeow Sawh.

Rawlins' girlfriend, nineteen-year-old Tenisha Morgan, vanished on 18 January 2008, while on her way to a city hospital to deliver her baby. Rawlins believed that his girlfriend was kidnapped by law enforcement officials in an effort to force Rawlins to turn himself in, although the Joint Services have repeatedly denied this claim. Rawlins telephoned the Criminal Investigations Department (CID) a few days after her disappearance, and warned them to turn over his girlfriend to him or face the consequences. His voice was positively identified by the police.

Following the Lusignan Massacre, a man claiming to be Rawlins contacted the local newspaper Kaieteur News by phone. He claimed responsibility for the Lusignan killings, but declared that he was not the mastermind behind the slaying of the Minister for Agriculture in 2006. Rawlins further warned that he would repeat a mass killing in Guyana if his girlfriend was not returned to him alive and well.

This threat was realized less than one month after the Lusignan Massacre, with another bloodbath in the mining town of Bartica, during which the town was under siege for approximately one hour. In that incident, thirteen people were murdered, including three policemen, while seven others sustained multiple gunshot wounds. As a result of the Bartica murders the reward for Rawlins was increased, from 5 million dollars to 50 million dollars, as public and international demands for justice increased.

=== Operation “Restore Order” ===
Two days after the Lusignan Massacre, the Joint Services launched Operation Restore Order, headed by the Commissioner of Police, Henry Greene. The operation was launched with the intention of capturing and disabling criminal gangs, and restoring law and order to the country. Sea, land and air resources were mobilized in an effort to capture the killers.

On Wednesday, 30 January 2008, members of the Joint Services were engaged in a shoot-out in the vicinity of Pond Dam, Buxton when around ten gunmen shot at, and threw grenades at, the Joint Service ranks. The shootout resulted in the death of two armed men. The two dead were identified as Vibert Leroy Harris (a.k.a. Bolo), of Friendship, East Coast Demerara, and Troy St. John (a.k.a. John Eye). St. John was believed to be Rawlins’ second in command.

During Operation Restore Order, the Joint Services cleared a section of the backlands of Buxton to prevent the criminals from escaping into the fields. They discovered the skeletal remains of one man who had been missing since 2007. The Joint Services also recovered several AK-47 rifles, hundreds of rounds of ammunition for various weapons, and military fatigues, among other items, during raids in Buxton.

The operation was extended to other towns and villages in Guyana following the second massacre at Bartica.

=== Condemnation of the attack ===
The Lusignan massacre was condemned by many factions of the Guyanese community as well as by various international bodies. All the Guyanese political parties and religious bodies unreservedly condemned the Lusignan massacre and called for an end to the brutal crimes. The ruling People's Progressive Party (PPP) issued a statement in which they strongly condemned “the brutal and cold blooded” murder of the eleven people at Lusignan, and said the attack on the Police Headquarters which preceded the slayings was “a well coordinated and centrally directed terrorist attack”.

=== Controversy ===
Various controversies have surrounded the motives of the Lusignan massacre, and the national response to the capture of the criminals.

The President of Guyana, Bharrat Jagdeo, refused to hold consultations on the country's crime situation with the main opposition leader, Robert Corbin. The president declared that he would not discuss the matter unless the opposition leader admitted that the community of Buxton was a safe-haven for criminals. The opposition leader said that he would not single out Buxton, as criminals could be found all over the country. Following the second massacre in Bartica, the President did later meet with all national stakeholders, parliamentary political parties and religious bodies on Wednesday, 20 February 2008.

As part of Operation Restore Order, the Joint Services conducted various search exercises in the homes of Buxtonians. Many residents complained that their household items were unnecessarily damaged beyond repair. There were also claims of unnecessary force used during the detainment of suspects from the village. The Joint Services subsequently said that all items damaged during the search exercises would be replaced or compensated for.

Operation Restore Order saw the clearing of the Buxton backlands, so as to prevent criminals from using the backlands to evade law enforcement. This affected the livelihood of Buxton farmers, as their cash crop farms were cleared. The government of Guyana subsequently set up a compensation scheme in order to assess the claims of destroyed farms and supply monetary compensation for all losses.

Tenisha Morgan, who was pregnant at the time of her disappearance, allegedly contacted her mother, Waple Morgan, while still missing. Her mother reportedly said she received a phone call from the young woman, who said she did not know where she was, but she was walking along a dam. She also reportedly said that the baby, a girl, was sick, and that they had no food. A massive search was launched for the missing woman and her baby, but neither were found. Police investigations found inconsistencies in Waple Morgan's report, and that she had changed her story of how she came to receive the phone call. This cast doubt on her reliability but, nonetheless, the police continued to search for the missing pair.

=== Rawlins' death ===
The search for Rawlins came to an end on 28 August 2008, when police caught up with Rawlins at one of his hideouts near the capital Georgetown. Police shot and killed Rawlins and two other gang members in the shoot-out that followed.

== See also ==
- List of massacres in Guyana
- Rondell Rawlins
