= Bartica massacre =

2008 murders in Guyana

Coordinates: 06°24′N 58°37′W

- Location: Bartica, Cuyuni-Mazaruni, Guyana
- Date: 17 February 2008
- Attack type: Mass shooting, vehicle-ramming attack
- Deaths: 12
- Perpetrators: Rondell Rawlins and his gang

The Bartica massacre was a 2008 mass murder of twelve residents of Bartica, Cuyuni-Mazaruni, Guyana, murdered by the criminal gang led by Rondell "Fineman" Rawlins. Rawlins and many of the other suspected gang members were later killed by Guyanese security forces. This massacre was part of a series of murders that appeared to have begun with the Mash Day Prison break.

== Events ==
On Sunday night, 17 February 2008, a number of gunmen attacked the mining community of Bartica, Essequibo, killing twelve residents and injuring several others. The group of about twenty armed gunmen arrived at Bartica by speed boat. They landed at the Transport and Harbours wharf around 10pm on Sunday night. Upon arrival, they attacked the Bartica Police Station, where they killed Lance Corporal Zaheer Zakir, Constable Shane Fredericks and Constable Ron Osbornes. After murdering the three police officers, the gang stole cash, arms, ammunition and a vehicle from the police station. Using the stolen police vehicle, they drove through the streets of Bartica shooting at civilians, fatally wounding Irwin Gilkes. They then proceeded to CBR Mining, where they killed Irving Ferreira, stole arms and ammunition, and removed two safes containing cash and gold. Next, they shot and killed Dexter Adrian before returning to the wharf. At the wharf, they executed Abdool Yassin Jr, Deonarine Singh, Errol Thomas, Ronald Gomes, Baldeo Singh and Ashraf Khan. After their one-hour rampage, the gunmen departed from Bartica by boat.

== Reaction ==
The Bartica Massacre was immediately linked with the Lusignan Massacre, while some initially questioned the link, the Guyanese security forces have since attributed all of the murders to Rondell Rawlins and his criminal gang. In the immediate aftermath, President Bharrat Jagdeo noted that the attackers targeted law enforcement, while others decried the apparent inability of the government and the security forces to deal with the extended crime wave.

=== Resolution ===
During June 2008, the Joint Services attacked a number of gang members at a camp near Christmas Falls, killing one and recovering weapons and ammunition. On 17 July 2008, two alleged members of the Rawlins’ gang were killed by police officers near Aroiama after hijacking a bus travelling from Aroaima to Linden. Police officers recovered weapons, ammunition, literature and the personal property of slain Agriculture Minister Satydeow Sawh, they also arrested a teenaged member of the gang.

On 28 August 2008, Rondell Rawlins and another gang member, Jermaine Charles, were shot and killed by the security forces. Rawlins and Charles were killed after a seven-hour standoff, which left one other person dead. During March 2011, five men were committed to stand trial for the murders at Bartica. One of the accused, Clebert Reece, has implicated three of his fellow defendants, along with Rawlins and other dead gang members. Another accused, Dennis Williams, has been convicted for possession of a mobile phone and attempting to escape, and was also believed to be responsible for causing a fire that damaged parts of the Camp Street Jail.

== See also ==
- List of massacres in Guyana
