= British Guiana Labour Party =

1946–1950 political party in British Guiana

The British Guiana Labour Party (BGLP) was a political party in British Guiana.

== History ==
The BGLP was formed in June 1946, with its leadership included Jung Bahadur Singh, J.A. Nicholson, Hubert Nathaniel Critchlow and Ashton Chase. It contested 13 of the 14 seats in the 1947 elections, winning five of them and becoming the largest party in the Legislative Council.

In 1949 Forbes Burnham became party leader, and the following year it merged with the Political Affairs Committee to form the People's Progressive Party.
