= Enterprise, Guyana =

Enterprise
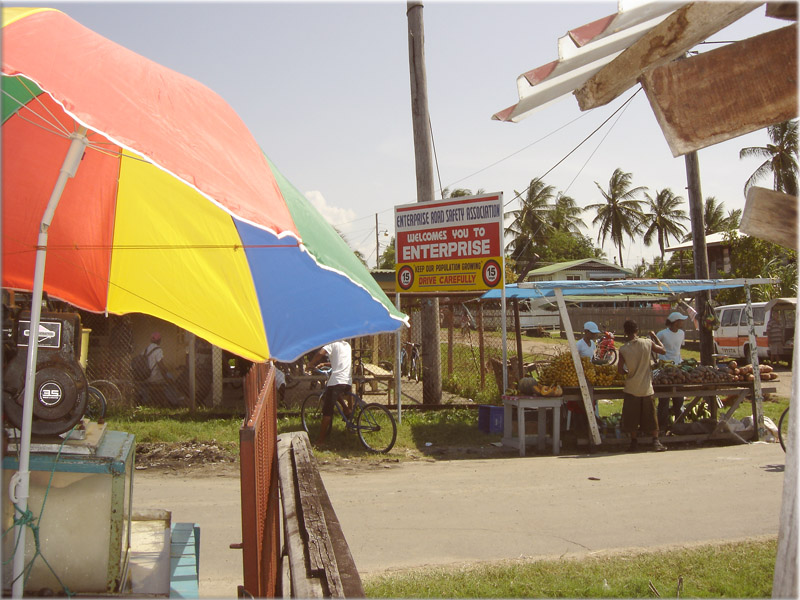

- Location in Guyana
- Coordinates: 6°45′N 58°0′W
- Country: Guyana
- Region: Demerara-Mahaica

Population (2012)
  - Total: 2,657

Enterprise is a village in the Demerara-Mahaica region along the coastal belt of Guyana. It is about two square miles in size and has a population of 2,657 as of 2012. It is located about 14 miles (23 km) southeast of the capital city Georgetown. This small community is flanked by Bachelors Adventure and a little further, Enmore to the east; Strasthpey on its west; Melanie Damishana and the Atlantic Ocean sits to the North. Some of the country's largest sugarcane fields are just beyond its southern horizon.

== History ==
Enterprise started in late 1940s when the residents of Nonpareil were granted new plots of land to start a community north-east of their current village. These plots were an upgrade from the primitive mud hut homes of the old village, which, bunched together, were unable to support the population swell that came in the early generations. The new space was much better suited for cultivating fruits and vegetables, and proved most durable as the community continued to grow.

In the 1950s the development of Enterprise moved at a steady pace, and by the end of the first decade, Enterprise had more than doubled its population. It had acquired both a Primary and Secondary school to educate its largest population of youths hitherto. The main streets were covered with asphalt to allow easier vehicle access and to reduce deterioration from soil erosion. A Community Center was added in 1960 under the control of Bookers' Sugar Estate but control was passed to the community leaders soon after and today it is operated and maintained by the community and remains the community's agora for public forums and meetings. Development in Enterprise was slower in subsequent decades, but it remained steady during these nascent years.

When, in 1964, the worst political strife between the Indo-Guyanese and the Afro-Guyanese took place, Guyana's Government and its economy stopped functioning and life in the entire country came to a standstill. Commerce, Schools and Law Enforcement ceased to function as they had and there were rampant murders, vandalism, looting, and civil clashes in magnitudes unseen hitherto. In quelling the uprising a line was drawn between these two dominant races and, as a result, mixed communities, like Enterprise, were forced to segregate its people. Riots continue to be commonplace throughout this decade and the divide created during this sensitive period can still be seen in many facets of community life today.

After the riots of 1960s Enterprise found itself with approximately 2,000 refugees from various neighboring villages, squatting on adjoining land to the south. These makeshift homes satisfied the basic, temporary needs of the displaced but for years to come they became detrimental to the community because many were forced to remain in these squalid condition. Enterprise found itself the victim of social impoverishment that came with squatters, such as widespread untreated diseases (hospital services were decades away), and fights, murders, and robberies were regular news. The transition period created hardship for all, but in the end, the small community of Enterprise expanded its borders to include these refugees and the social disturbances dwindled in time.

In 1992, with a change in ruling political party, the country underwent an extraordinary change. Development unseen for decades started reappearing. Enterprise's population grew at a steady pace again and an old overcrowding problem also reappeared. In response, the new government introduced a program to sell vacant land north to its residents first and then to families from around the country. This brought a huge relief to the crowded community and within a few years new homes filled the surrounding pasture land.

Once again Enterprise's physical appearance had changed. The end of the 20th century saw Enterprise transform to a giant descendant of that small hut village Nonpareil, housing the many branches of its offspring and new families from all around Guyana.

== Culture ==
The culture in Enterprise still resembles that of the Indian immigrants who crossed the Atlantic Ocean over 150 years ago. Even though over 90% of the population remains Indo-Guyanese - a small group of Chinese and Amerindian make up the minority - the culture is very similar to that of the rest of the British Caribbean, but with, according to the locals, an East Indian flair.

In the beginning, the culture of Enterprise was very much like that of the mother country, India, but as Africans and Chinese joined the village a slight variety was added. The residents of Enterprise, the Indo-Guyanese, Afro-Guyanese, and Chinese brought their foods, traditions, religion and customs to the new world. But after the racially motivated outburst of 1964, Enterprise became a 100% Indo-Guyanese village, but still the contributions the Afro-Guyanese and Chinese made had left lasting impressions in Enterprise. This is very prevalent today in the food and language of the people.

Over the years, the Indian population has lost its mother tongue entirely. Hindi is considered a dead language and the English language, with a slight Creole touch, is the lingua of choice in Guyana. However, Indian music remains very popular and films from India are a staple in Cinemas throughout the country. The colloquial English use is heavily influenced by the British. Being a colony for many years, Guyana is in touch with a flair of British in almost everything and so is Enterprise. Like the British custom of drinking tea, many daily activities are in small ways reflective of the past. Even the system of Government, although it has been slightly modified over the years, still imitates the British rules and laws.

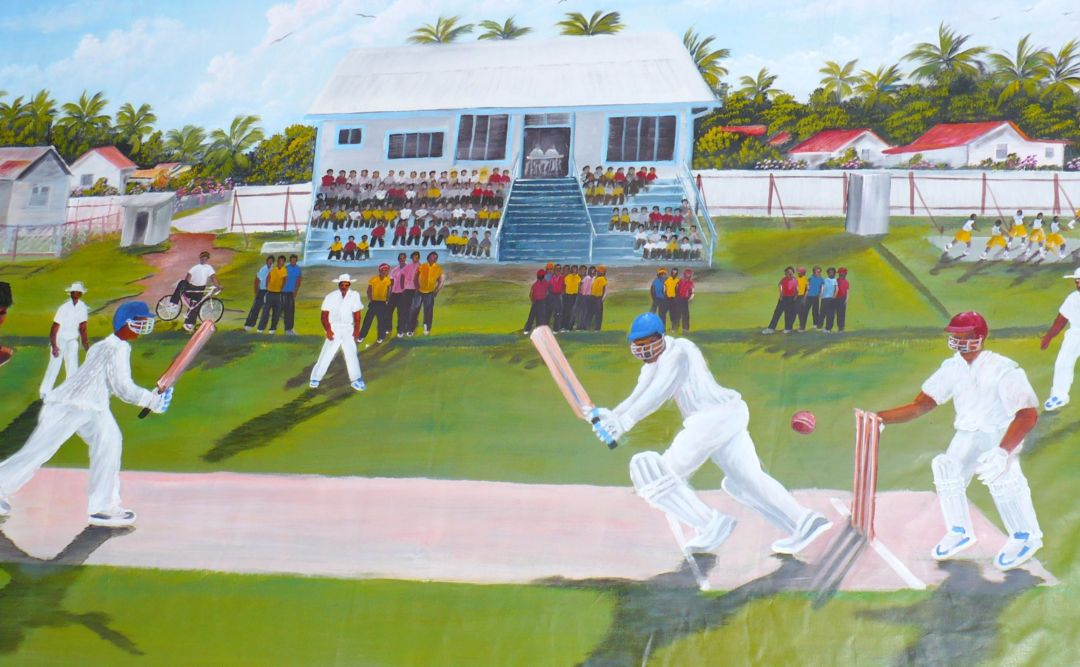
Cricket Match in progress at the Community Center by Local Artist

Religious beliefs of the people have gone through a major transformation as well. Even though the composition of the population has remained the same for over 45 years, religious beliefs have changed dramatically. The two dozen Christian churches that now dot the village claim over 60% of the younger generation and approximately 30% of the older generation have converted to this recently introduced faith. Regardless of religious conviction every holiday, social or religious, are celebrated and respected by all. Many of the customs that advocate public life are commonly organized by community leaders at home and abroad.

Many of the original religious customs and traditions that have not been lost were modified by the ages and vestiges of an East Indian heritage appear in a number of the festivities. For example, few weddings are ever complete without the ceremonial rubbing of the dye; an old Indian wedding custom that is accepted among every religion. Holidays like Christmas and Diwali are examples of occasions where the entire community celebrates together in a congenial integration of faith.

== Education ==
Enterprise has three schools; a Nursery, a Primary, and a Secondary school and their education system follow a derivation of the colonial British model. The Primary and Secondary school were built in 1960 and are housed in the same building. Together, they handle educating the children of Enterprise and surrounding villages.

The education system under the British progressed very slowly. It was, at first, very Christian oriented. Even the schools were named after religion e.g. Anglicans, Lutheran. Christianity was taught in every school and only a Christian was allowed to teach. The education received was sometimes useless to promote the needs of the community and that was because it was modelled on the English system and not applicable to the poor, destitute environment.

In the 1960s, the only school in the village was the government school, where all of the teachers were non-resident, Christian and non-Indian, in a community that was 100 percent Indian, mostly Hindus. Year after year, not even a single student passed the national school-leaving examinations, and the education system never flagged this as a matter to be concerned about. A major milestone occurred in 1963, when for the first time, a teacher of Indian descent(1) was appointed to the school. In 1964, twenty-nine of that teacher's students passed the PCE examinations, shattering a barrier that held down that community for many years, and allowed them to aspire for something better than being estate labourers. Many of those students are now successful professionals and entrepreneurs.

The education level then significantly deteriorated in the 1970s and further in the 1980s, primarily due to lack of funding. Adding to the problems, many of the better-educated professionals and teachers emigrated to other countries during this period, because of low pay, lack of opportunities and rampant crime. This period of poor investments in Education and huge 'brain-drain' was a notorious pattern seen throughout the country.

For about thirty years before 1992 there was a precipitous drop in Education. It took a very long time but by the mid-1990s the education system has changed to suit the needs of the country and of Enterprise.

Although the education system started showing signs of recovery in the 1990s, it still does not produce the high quality of well-rounded, educated students of the past generation and consequently, the workforce continues to fall behind most conventional standards. Over the last ten years a slow development has begun but it is being negated by another mass migration of the trained professionals.

(1) Teacher: Mr Sham Lall

== Economy ==
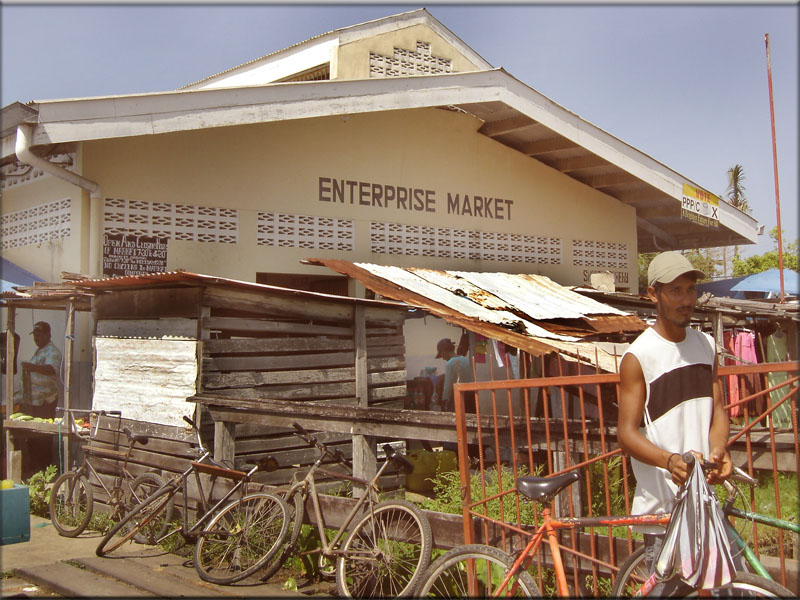
July day at Enterprise Market.

Enterprise was established because of the sugar industry, and as a result, the entire economy was structured around this industry. The Sugar Industry still makes up the largest part of Enterprise's economy, while General Goods stores and Commercial transportation come in a close second and third.

During these early years, and still today to a lesser extent, anything that disrupted the sugar plantation caused a stir in Enterprise.

Agriculture made up a larger part of the economy 10 years ago but today many are finding alternatives to field work. Poor maintenance of drainage and irrigation coupled with recent crop-killing floods have also contributed to more people moving from the farms to the factories. The handful of die-hard farmers today export most of their produce to larger markets in Georgetown, namely Stabroek Market and Bourda Market, which unlike Enterprise's marketplace, are open everyday except Sundays. The local market opens only on Fridays and has attracted many out-of-village goods and produces recent

In the last decade, the economy of this small community has changed drastically. Today less than half of the residents depend on the sugar industry and those working in factories, schools, offices, and commercial transportation.
