= Baháʼí Faith in Guyana =

The Baháʼí Faith in Guyana was first mentioned in Baháʼí sources as early as 1916, the first Baháʼís visited as early as 1927 but the community was founded in Guyana in 1953 with the beginning of the arrival of coordinated pioneers and from Guyanese converts. The community elected the first Baháʼí Local Spiritual Assembly in 1955 and an independent National Spiritual Assembly in 1977. The Baháʼí community, while relatively small, is well known for its emphasis on unity, non-involvement in politics and its work in issues such as literacy and youth issues.

The country has experienced large migrations and the size of the Baháʼí community has also dramatically changed. Rapid growth took place from 1964 to 1996, but levelled off and was affected by emigration. The 2002 national census showed about 0.1%, or 500, Baháʼís mostly in three of its 10 Regions, though Baháʼís were noted in every Region. Baháʼís are now widely distributed across Guyana and are represented in all major racial groups and regions. In 2019 a reporter for the Guyana Chronicle wrote that there were more than 800 Bahá’is, "spread across the 10 administrative regions of Guyana".

== Size and demographics ==
Baháʼí sources state there were 110 members in 1969 and that by 1989 there were 22,000, with 11,000 joining the religion in a three-month period in 1989. C. 1990–1996 Baháʼí sources claimed their population to be over 5% of the population. Large migrations, including many Baháʼís, left Guyana for other places, especially New York and Toronto. By the time of the 2002 national census the Baháʼí population had ebbed to about 500 Baháʼís mostly in Regions 3, 4, and 6 though Baháʼís were noted in every Region. The 2012 census only noted that Baháʼís were less than 1% of the population.

The first edition of World Christian Encyclopedia (1982) estimated the Baháʼís in Guyana to be 1,700 in 1970, 2,200 in 1975, and 2,700 in 1980. The second edition of World Christian Encyclopedia (2001) estimated the Baháʼís in Guyana to be 13,000 in 1990, and 14,584 in 2000. It also noted that the Baháʼís in Guyana experienced, "Rapid growth from 1 local spiritual assembly (1964) to 17 (1973), then to 68 LSAs by 1996."

In 2005 the Association of Religion Data Archives (relying mostly on the World Christian Encyclopedia) estimated some 13,000 Baháʼís.

More recently the national assembly mentioned adding assemblies in Lethem, Corentyne and Essequibo. Baháʼís are now widely distributed across Guyana and represent all major racial groups and regions. The Baháʼí community, while relatively small, is well known for its emphasis on unity, non-involvement in politics and its work in issues such as literacy and youth issues.

Svetlana Marshall, writing for the Guyana Chronicle, wrote in 2019, "More than 800 Bahá’is are spread across the 10 administrative regions of Guyana".

== Opening ==
=== ʻAbdu'l-Bahá's Tablets of the Divine Plan ===
ʻAbdu'l-Bahá, then head of the religion, wrote a series of letters, or tablets, to the followers of the religion in the United States in 1916–1917; these letters were compiled together in the book titled Tablets of the Divine Plan. The sixth of the tablets was the first to mention Latin American regions and was written on April 8, 1916, but was delayed in being presented in the United States until 1919 — after the end of World War I and the Spanish flu. The first actions on the part of Baháʼí community towards Latin America were that of a few individuals who made trips to Mexico and South America near or before this unavailing in 1919, including Mr. and Mrs. Frankland, and Roy Wilhelm, and Martha Root. Root's travels to Latin America began in the summer of 1919. The sixth tablet was translated and presented by Ahmad Sohrab on April 4, 1919, and published in Star of the West magazine on December 12, 1919. He listed the countries and islands of central and south America, including "the guianas", as places that the Baháʼís of north America should visit and open to the Baháʼí Faith.

Following the release of these tablets and then ʻAbdu'l-Bahá's death in 1921, a few Baháʼís began moving to or at least visiting Latin America. In 1927 Leonora Armstrong made public mention of the religion in the capital city of Georgetown of what was then British Guiana.

=== Seven Year Plan and succeeding decades ===
Shoghi Effendi, who was named ʻAbdu'l-Bahá's successor, wrote a cable on May 1, 1936 to the Baháʼí Annual Convention of the United States and Canada, and asked for the systematic implementation of ʻAbdu'l-Bahá's vision to begin. In his cable he wrote:

...Would to God every State within American Republic and every Republic in American continent might ere termination of this glorious century embrace the light of the Faith of Baháʼu'lláh and establish structural basis of His World Order."

Following the May 1st cable, another cable from Shoghi Effendi came on May 19 calling for permanent pioneers to be established in all the countries of Latin America. The Baháʼí National Spiritual Assembly of the United States and Canada was appointed the Inter-America Committee to take charge of the preparations. In 1936 Dudley M. Blakely, after becoming a Baháʼí in 1920, embarked with Elsa, his wife, on worldwide travels to promote the religion and travelled to Guyana for several weeks to promulgate the religion. During the 1937 Baháʼí North American Convention, Shoghi Effendi cabled advising the convention to prolong their deliberations to permit the delegates and the National Assembly to consult on a plan that would enable Baháʼís to go to Latin America as well as to include the completion of the outer structure of the Baháʼí House of Worship in Wilmette, Illinois. In 1937 the First Seven Year Plan (1937–44), which was an international plan designed by Shoghi Effendi, gave the American Baháʼís the goal of establishing the Baháʼí Faith in every country in Latin America. With the spread of American Baháʼís communities and assemblies began to form in 1938 across Latin America.

=== First Baháʼís ===
The first Baháʼí to settle in Guyana was Dr. Malcolm King, a Jamaican, who travelled from his home in the United States in 1953 via Trinidad. In 1955 the first Baháʼí Local Spiritual Assembly was elected in Guyana in Georgetown.

Following the election of the regional National Spiritual Assembly of South America in 1950, in 1957 this assembly was split into two - basically northern/eastern South America and one of the western/southern South America. In 1963 smaller groups of Baháʼís were known in Campelville, Kitty and Lodge Village (now suburbs of Georgetown), Grove and Providence (both in Demerara-Mahaica in East Bank Demerara), and MacKenzie (now part of Linden).

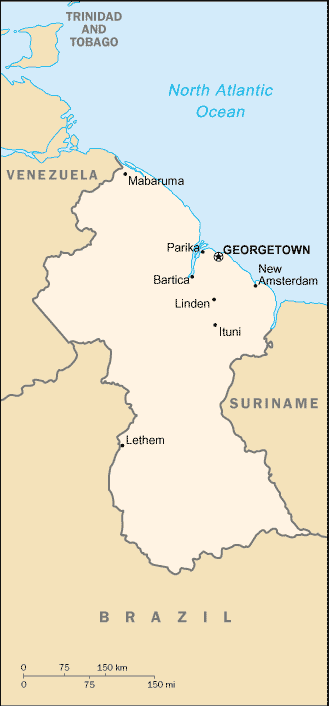

In August 1965 the Baháʼís of Georgetown hosted a regional conference with Hand of the Cause Jalál Kházeh and Baháʼís from British, French and Dutch Guiana, northern Brazil, eastern Venezuela and Trinidad attending. In early February, 1968 Hand of the Cause Rúhíyyih Khanum visited giving public talks, visiting a school for the blind, and civic leaders.

=== Regional integration ===
In 1970 the Baháʼís of Guyana, Surinamé and French Guiana first elected a regional National Spiritual Assembly. Rúhíyyih Khanum represented the Universal House of Justice at the convention to elect the assembly. There were 54 delegates representing at least 10 assemblies in Guyana, 3 in Surinamé and 3 in French Guiana. The members elected were Jamshid Ar-jomandi; Henry Dolphin; August Holland; Cheryl Plerre; Ellen Widmer; Mr. Rivadavia da Silva, Eileen Hill, Ivan Fraser, and Daisy Hahnfeld. While there Rúhíyyih Khanum again spoke to the public press and civic leaders this time including then President Arthur Chung. Her comments dwelt on the Baháʼí teachings of the oneness of humanity and ending racial prejudices.

The first regional Baha'i Youth Conference was held in Paramaribo, December 29 through 31, 1972. The Conference was especially for Baha'i youth of Trinidad and Tobago, Aruba, Bonaire, Curaçao, Guyana, Surinam and French Guiana. A sixth youth conference was held in 1979. Meanwhile, in 1975 the National Assembly asked for guidance from the Universal House of Justice on the approach to respond to requirements of national service which advised such service for agriculture was approved while trying to minimize the chances of service requiring combat. Early in 1976 the first members of the Macushi and Wai Wai tribes joined the religion. In December 1976 the assembly was able to officially incorporate. In 1977 the Surinamé and French Guiana communities organized their own national assembly and Guyana elected an independent assembly. The elected members of the first National Assembly of Guyana were Sheila Dolphin, Henry Dolphin, Ellen Widmer, Frank Sheffey, Ivan Fraser, Eileen Hill, David Morris, Rooplall Doodnauth, and Krishna Seegopaul. Meanwhile, pioneers continued to arrive in Guyana. In July and August 1980 Shanaz Furudi, a Baháʼí from India toured Guyana and addressing the public and offering training for Baháʼí institutions. Guyanese residents of Asian Indian extraction learned of the religion's situation there. While she was there the first Baháʼí of the Arecuna (see Pemon) converted.

Guyanese citizens have also moved to other countries where some have become Baháʼís as well.

In Guyana in 1980 saw the first Baháʼí women's conference. A main topic through the conference was the role of women in religion as well topics dealing with life in the tropics. In April 1981 more than 60 artists attended a workshop set up by five Baháʼí artists which presented workshops emphasizing spiritual issues and introduced Baháʼí sand-painter David Villasenor to the Guyanese.

== 1980—2000 ==
The religion entered a new phase of activity when a message of the Universal House of Justice dated 20 October 1983 was released. Baháʼís were urged to seek out ways, compatible with the Baháʼí teachings, in which they could become involved in the social and economic development of the communities in which they lived. World-wide in 1979 there were 129 officially recognized Baháʼí socio-economic development projects. By 1987, the number of officially recognized development projects had increased to 1482. In the 1980s the Guyanese Baháʼí community's established an Office of Social and Economic Development which consulted with rural communities on a needs assessment which focused on the issue of literacy. In 1984 Baháʼí Frank Fernandes, a native of Guyana, was the guest of honour at a dinner of civic leaders followed by a piano recital at, and a fundraiser for, the National Cultural Centre for an audience of 250. One response of the community was to contact the Baháʼí communities in Canada, the US, and the UK. Together they made arrangements for 40,000 reading books which became the basis of libraries in 65 villages. Training workshops were organized with the cooperation of the Ministry of Education which were developed in the context of the Macushi and Wapashana languages. As recently as 2000 Baháʼís were noted contributing to the training of 1500 teachers for this project. Also in the 1980s some Baháʼís opened a private school - the School of the Nations in Guyana, an all age private Baháʼí inspired school. There are 650 full-time students (representing 22 nationalities) and 300 adults who pursue the International General Certificate of Secondary Education in the evenings.

In 1988 represented a year of multiple events. In April an inter-Guyana conference of Baháʼís was held. In May Baháʼí youth mobilized for activities from which over 200 converted. In June two Baháʼí physicians from Great Britain visited Guyana for two weeks to conduct lectures and work at Georgetown Public Hospital and then toured the country at Baháʼí events. In 1992 the government of Guyana honoured the Baháʼís by releasing stamps overprinted noting the Baháʼí Holy Year in 1992. In 1999 the national assembly contributed to the dialogue on the reform of the Constitution of Guyana.

== Modern community ==
In the 2000s Baháʼí organizations cooperated with projects to fight the spread of poverty and AIDs among youth - as well as studies on the effectiveness of religion in motivating people to deal with social ills. In 2002 the Baháʼís collectively and individually contributed to the Guyana Peace Education Institute at its inauguration and to discussions on reform held at the Muslim Youth Organization office. Youth workshops were noted in 2006 presenting patterns for change to cycles of social ills like alcoholism and family violence and participated in national discussions and exhibitions on ethnic relations by the National Commission on Ethnic Relations in 2006 and dialogues on religious tolerance. The Baháʼí community was also noted for its support for inter-religious activities through the Inter-Religious Organization (IRO), a nongovernmental umbrella organization for Christian, Hindu, Islamic, and Baháʼí organizations, and the Ethnic Relations Commission.

Le Repentir Cemetery in Georgetown has a section for Baháʼí burials.

== See also ==
- Religion in Guyana
- History of Guyana
- Baháʼí Faith in Suriname
- Baháʼí Faith in French Guiana
