= 1947 British Guiana general election =

General elections were held in British Guiana on 24 November 1947. The British Guiana Labour Party emerged as the largest party, winning five of the 14 seats. Voter turnout was 71%.

== Electoral system ==
Constitutional changes in 1943 resulted in a 25-member Legislative Council, of which 14 seats were elected, seven held by appointed members and four by members of the appointed Executive Council. The franchise was also changed; with the right to vote was extended to people earning at least $10 a month, although candidates were required to have a monthly income of at least $100. As a result, the electorate increased in size from 9,514 in the 1935 elections to 59,193.

The elections were using fourteen single-member constituencies.

== Campaign ==
The elections were contested by the Manpower Citizens' Association (MPCA), the British Guiana Labour Party (BGLP), as well as 31 independents, who included three members of the Political Affairs Committee (PAC) and one from the Women's Political and Economic Organisation. The BGCP contested 13 of the 14 seats, with the MPCA putting forward seven candidates.

The BGLP campaigned for the introduction of universal suffrage, and creation of a 24-member Legislative Council and self-government within five years, as well as land redistribution and more housebuilding. The MPCA called for the nationalisation of industry and the introduction of land settlement schemes. Grenadian independence campaigner T.A. Marryshow arrived in British Guiana to celebrate the BGLP's anniversary, and also campaigned for the party.

== Results ==
Party	Votes	%	Seats
British Guiana Labour Party			5
Manpower Citizens' Association			1
Independents			8
Total			14
Registered voters/turnout	59,193	–	
Source: Stabroek News

=== Elected members ===
Constituency	Member	Party
Berbice River	Clement Patrick Ferreira	
Central Demerara	Cheddi Jagan	Independent (PAC)
Demerara-Essequibo	Jung Bahadur Singh	British Guiana Labour Party
Demerara River	Joseph Patrick Coghlan	
Eastern Berbice	George Mayo Gonsalves	
Eastern Demerara	Daniel Prabhudas Debidin	
Essequibo River	Theophilus Lee	
Georgetown Central	John Fernandes	
Georgetown North	J.A. Nicholson	British Guiana Labour Party
Georgetown South	Hubert Nathaniel Critchlow	British Guiana Labour Party
New Amsterdam	Rudy Kendall	
North Western District	William Phang	
Western Berbice	Aaron Theophilus Peters	
Western Essequibo	Claude Vibart Wight	
Source: Parliament of Guyana

== Aftermath ==
Following the elections, the election of Hubert Nathaniel Critchlow in South Georgetown was overturned by an electoral petition that claimed false statements had been made against his opponent Frances Stafford, including that she had kicked an African child and been fined. The subsequent by-election was won by John Carter, who defeated Stafford.
