= Guyana Labour Union =

Trade Union in Guyana

The Guyana Labour Union is a trade union centre in Guyana, previously known as the British Guiana Labour Union.

== History ==
The BGLU was founded in 1919, emerging as a labour union amongst black dockworkers. Led by Hubert Critchlow. It soon expanded into a colony-wide labour movement. BGLU was not the first trade union in the Caribbean, but was the first to be legally registered.

By 1928 the organization claimed to have 1,073 members, of whom 341 were women. It was linked to the British Labour Party, and affiliated to the International Federation of Trade Unions and the Labour and Socialist International (1924–1940). The organization did not struggle for national independence, but concentrated its campaigning on social matters and suffrage rights.

BGLU was joined by A. R. F. Webber.

BGLU took the initiative for cooperation between trade unions in the Caribbean. At the 1926 BGLU convention, the British Guiana and West Indian Trade Union Confederation was founded. In 1945, BG&WITUC became the Caribbean Labour Congress.

Forbes Burnham (later the president of Guyana) became president of GLU in 1952, and served until 1956. Ashton Chase was the president of GLU from 1961 to 1963. Burnham again became GLU president 1963–1965. Desmond Hoyte, who also became president of the country, served as GLU honorary president in the 1980s.

The Guyana Labour Union later became associated with the People's National Congress. Robert Williams is the general secretary of GLU.
