= Le Repentir Cemetery =

Cemetery in Georgetown, Guyana

- Interactive map of Le Repentir Cemetery

Details
- Established: March, 1861
- Location: Georgetown
- Country: Guyana
- Coordinates: 6.80026°N 58.15651°W

Le Repentir Cemetery is a cemetery established in the nineteenth century on Princess St, Georgetown, Guyana. It is the main Georgetown cemetery and the largest cemetery in Guyana.

== History ==
An earlier town cemetery established in 1797 at the Werk-en-rust plantation was deemed unsuitable for general use in 1846. Established in 1861 Le Repentir cemetery was originally a part of the Plantation Le Repentir named by its owner Pierre Louis de Saffon.

== Burials ==
The first burial at Le Repentir Cemetery was Antonio Gonzales aged 45 from Madeira. He was buried on March 15, 1861. There is a section for Baháʼí burials. Various religious organizations were given allotted sections, including the Muslims, Hindus, Roman Catholics, Anglicans, Lutherans, Chinese, Bahais and Presbyterians. Five men known as the Enmore Martyrs are buried at Le Repentir Cemetery. Also Egbert Martin regarded as the founder of modern Guyanese literature was buried here. New York policeman Randolph Holder killed in the line of duty was buried here.

== See also ==
- Bourda Cemetery, Guyana located on historic Plantation Vlissengen
