= Hindu College, Cove and John =

Hindu secondary school in Cove and John, Guyana

Coordinates: 6.753694°N 57.970072°W

The Hindu College is a Hindu secondary school located at Cove and John in the Demerara-Mahaica region of Guyana. Founded in 1959 as a successor to the East Coast High School, the institution operates under the auspices of the Guyana Sevashram Sangha, a branch of the Bharat Sevashram Sangh. As of early 2022, the Hindu College enrolled approximately 125 students, with capacity for up to 200. The school demonstrated strong academic performance in 2010, when all 15 students taking the Caribbean Secondary Education Certificate (CSEC) examinations passed, earning a total of 51 Grade Ones, 47 Grade Twos, and 37 Grade Threes.

== History ==
The origins of the Hindu College trace back to 1957, when Swami Purnanand, a disciple of Swami Pranavananda, established the East Coast High School to educate the children of farmers in the region. In 1959, with the arrival of Swami Dibyananda from India, the school was reconstituted as Hindu College. It was later renamed Hindu College and Institute of Technology, reflecting its expanded focus on technical education.

In 2010, the college recorded a 100% pass-rate for students taking the Caribbean Secondary Education Certificate (CSEC). That same year, the Hindu College received a $300,000 donation to fund the establishment of a learning resource centre that was named the Zara Learning Centre. The college is closely affiliated with the Cove and John Ashram and continues to be influenced by the religious and educational missions of the Bharat Sevashram Sangh. As of 2010 and continuing into 2022, Rajkumarie Singh served as principal, reportedly holding the position for five decades. The institution also briefly employed Bharat Jagdeo, who later became President of Guyana, as a teacher.

Although founded within a Hindu religious framework, the Hindu College has historically welcomed students and staff of all religious backgrounds. The original East Coast High School had policies that enabled prayer according to Hindu, Christian, and Muslim traditions. While Hindu prayers became the norm in later years, hiring practices and admissions have remained inclusive, with no formal religious restrictions. The college benefits from shared religious and cultural infrastructure. Its new computer lab, inaugurated in 2021, provides free internet access and serves as a technological training hub for the region. The college actively engages with the religious and cultural life of the Cove and John Ashram. Students regularly participate in Ramayana satsangs, arati worship, and Hindu festivals such as Maha Shivaratri. In 2022, a 50-foot statue of Shiva was consecrated at the Ashram, envisioned by Khemnauth Sookram, the sculptor of an 80-foot Hanuman statue in Essequibo.

== Student demographics ==
As of early 2022, the Hindu College had an enrollment of approximately 125 students, though its facilities are built to accommodate up to 200 students. In 2010, all 15 students sitting for the Caribbean Secondary Education Certificate (CSEC) passed their subjects, collectively earning 51 Grade Ones, 47 Grade Twos, and 37 Grade Threes.
