= Alisha Natasha Fortune =

Guyanese track and field athlete

Alisha Natasha Fortune (born June 5, 1975) is a Guyanese track and field athlete known for sprint events. She is the 2015 W40 World Champion at 100 metres, 200 metres and 400 metres. In 2014, she had won gold medals in the same events at the NCCWMA Games in San Jose, Costa Rica. Previously she had represented Guyana at the 2011 ALBA Games.

She began running at age 9, initially as a distance runner but was converted to sprinting after coach Dennis Smith saw her running. As early as age 17, she qualified for the 1992 CARIFTA Games, but was not able to attend due to financial limitations. Those limitations meant she never was able to go to the Olympics where Guyana sends limited representation. She was already a W35 masters athlete when she set her personal best in the 200 metres 24.33 (+0.5) winning the Hampton International Classic in Port of Spain in 2010.

Her interest in athletics has continued as a professional massage therapist and single mother of three children. Her ability to excel on the world scene later in life has been aided by sponsorship she received from a local store in Georgetown.

Originally from Beterverwagting, she also spends time as a football referee and body builder. She took to body building in 2007 and has since made working out at the gym a part of her lifestyle. She entered the Hugh Ross Classic bodybuilding competition and has won five times since. She has also won "Miss Best Legs" every year at the local Flex Night competition.
