= Brandon Bess =

West Indian cricketer

Personal information
- Full name: Brandon Jeremy Bess
- Born: 13 December 1987 (age 38); Rosignol, Berbice, Guyana
- Batting: Right-handed
- Bowling: Right-arm fast-medium

International information
- National side: West Indies
- Only Test (cap 286): 26 June 2010 v South Africa

Domestic team information
- Years: Team
- 2007/08–2011/12: Guyana

Career statistics
Competition	Test	FC	LA	T20
Matches	1	32	6	1
Runs scored	11	206	4	0
Batting average	11.00	7.62	–	–
100s/50s	0/0	0/0	0/0	–
Top score	11*	33	4*	–
Balls bowled	78	3,246	138	24
Wickets	1	56	3	1
Bowling average	92.00	40.33	41.00	24.00
5 wickets in innings	0	1	0	0
10 wickets in match	0	0	0	0
Best bowling	1/65	5/28	1/20	1/24
Catches/stumpings	0/–	13/–	3/–	1/–
- Source: CricketArchive, 20 April 2019

Brandon Jeremy Bess (born 13 December 1987) is a former international cricketer who made his debut for the West Indies cricket team in June 2010 as a late replacement for Nelon Pascal, who was injured pre-match. A right-arm fast-medium bowler and lower order right-handed batsman, he plays first-class cricket for Guyana.

== Cricket career ==
=== Early cricket ===
Bess made his debut for Guyana in January 2008, playing in a Carib Beer Cup match against Trinidad and Tobago. He played only one further match in the 2007–08 season. He played more regularly in 2008–09, and appeared for West Indies A against the touring England XI, claiming a solitary wicket. The season also saw him make his first appearances in List A cricket, playing two matches for Guyana in November 2008.

His best bowling figures came early in the 2009–10 season, when he claimed four wickets in the first innings against Jamaica. He completed 2009–10 with a bowling average of 33.69, his best season average. His performances saw him appear for the West Indies A against the Zimbabweans in April 2010.

=== Test call-up ===
During the 2010 home series against South Africa, Bess made a surprise debut. Nelon Pascal, himself in the team for the missing Ravi Rampaul, suffered a neck injury during the pre-match warm-up exercises. Bess, who was training at the High Performance Centre in Bridgetown was rushed to the ground, not arriving until the second over of the match. Bess, who came into the game with a first-class bowling average of 48.80, opened the bowling for the West Indies, but saw opposition captain Graeme Smith score three boundaries off his first over. He was taken off after his second over as Chris Gayle turned to spinner Shane Shillingford. He returned in the twentieth over, and claimed the wicket of nightwatchman Paul Harris. He continued to bowl expensively, with 65 runs coming off the 9 overs that he bowled in the first innings. Cricinfo's Siddhartha Talya was unimpressed with his performance:

...and Bess adding to the frustration with his indiscipline with the second new-ball. He bowled seven no-balls, provided width, strayed on the pads and dropped short to be dealt with each time by the batsmen who gradually had begun to loosen up.
