= South African cricket team in the West Indies in 2010 =

International cricket tour

	South Africa	West Indies
- Dates: 19 May – 30 June 2010
Captains	Graeme Smith	Chris Gayle

Test series
- Result: South Africa won the 3-match series 2–0
Most runs	Graeme Smith (371)	Shivnarine Chanderpaul (300)
Most wickets	Dale Steyn (15)	Sulieman Benn (15)
- Player of the series: Dale Steyn (SA)

One Day International series
- Results: South Africa won the 5-match series 5–0
Most runs	Hashim Amla (402)	Dwayne Bravo (174)
Most wickets	Morné Morkel (11)	Kieron Pollard (8); Dwayne Bravo (8)
- Player of the series: Hashim Amla (SA)

Twenty20 International series
- Results: South Africa won the 2-match series 2–0
Most runs	Jacques Kallis (53)	Dwayne Bravo (60)
Most wickets	Johan Botha (5); Ryan McLaren (5)	Jerome Taylor (4)

The South African cricket team was touring West Indies from 19 May to 30 June 2010. The tour consisted of two Twenty20s (T20), five One Day Internationals (ODIs) and three Tests.

The fifth ODI and the first Test, as well as a tour match, was scheduled to be played at Sabina Park in Kingston, Jamaica, but due to the 2010 Kingston unrest, these were moved to Port of Spain.

== T20I series ==
=== 1st T20I ===
19 May
Scorecard

South Africa; 136/7 (20 overs)	v	West Indies; 123 (19.5 overs)
Jacques Kallis 53 (45); Kieron Pollard 2/22 (4 overs)		Kieron Pollard 27 (20); Ryan McLaren 5/19 (3.5 overs)

South Africa won by 13 runs
Sir Vivian Richards Stadium, North Sound, Antigua
Umpires: Clyde Duncan and Norman Malcolm
Player of the match: Ryan McLaren (SA)

- West Indies won the toss and elected to field

=== 2nd T20I ===
20 May
Scorecard

South Africa; 120/7 (20 overs)	v	West Indies; 119/7 (20 overs)
David Miller 33 (26); Jerome Taylor 3/15 (4 overs)		Dwayne Bravo 40 (42); Johan Botha 3/22 (4 overs)

South Africa won by 1 run
Sir Vivian Richards Stadium, North Sound, Antigua
Umpires: Clyde Duncan and Norman Malcolm
Player of the match: Johan Botha (SA)

- West Indies won the toss and elected to field

== ODI series ==
=== 1st ODI ===
22 May
Scorecard

South Africa; 280/7 (48 overs)	v	West Indies; 215 (44.1 overs)
Hashim Amla 102 (109); AB de Villiers 102 (101); Dwayne Bravo 3/40 (10 overs)		Chris Gayle 45 (39); Morné Morkel 3/40 (8 overs)

South Africa won by 66 runs (D/L)
Sir Vivian Richards Stadium, North Sound, Antigua
Umpires: Daryl Harper (Aus) and Norman Malcolm
Player of the match: Hashim Amla (SA)

- West Indies won the toss and elected to field
- The match was reduced to 48 overs per side due to rain

=== 2nd ODI ===
24 May
Scorecard

South Africa; 300/5 (50 overs)	v	West Indies; 283 (48.1 overs)
Hashim Amla 92 (95); Kieron Pollard 2/39 (8 overs)		Dwayne Bravo 74 (70); Morné Morkel 3/58 (9.1 overs)

South Africa won by 17 runs
Sir Vivian Richards Stadium, North Sound, Antigua
Umpires: Clyde Duncan and Daryl Harper (Aus)
Player of the match: Hashim Amla (SA)

- South Africa won the toss and elected to bat

=== 3rd ODI ===
28 May
Scorecard

South Africa; 224 (47.2 overs)	v	West Indies; 157 (38.0 overs)
AB de Villiers 70 (80); Kieron Pollard 2/27 (6 overs)		Dale Richards 28 (30); Morné Morkel 4/21 (7 overs)

South Africa won by 67 runs
Windsor Park, Roseau, Dominica
Umpires: Billy Doctrove and Daryl Harper (Aus)
Player of the match: AB de Villiers (SA)

- South Africa won the toss and elected to bat

=== 4th ODI ===
30 May
Scorecard

West Indies; 303/6 (50 overs)	v	South Africa; 304/3 (50 overs)
Shivnarine Chanderpaul 66 (89); Lonwabo Tsotsobe 2/48 (8 overs)		Hashim Amla 129 (115); Dwayne Bravo 1/41 (7 overs)

South Africa won by 7 wickets
Windsor Park, Roseau, Dominica
Umpires: Billy Doctrove and Daryl Harper (Aus)
Player of the match: Hashim Amla (SA)

- West Indies won the toss and elected to bat

=== 5th ODI ===
3 June
Scorecard

West Indies; 252/6 (50.0 overs)	v	South Africa; 255/9 (49.4 overs)
Shivnarine Chanderpaul 67 (104); Lonwabo Tsotsobe 2/31 (7 overs)		Jacques Kallis 57 (55); Kieron Pollard 2/42 (9.4 overs)

South Africa won by 1 wicket
Queen's Park Oval, Port of Spain, Trinidad
Umpires: Daryl Harper (Aus) and Norman Malcolm
Player of the match: Jacques Kallis (SA)

- West Indies won the toss and elected to bat

== Test series ==
=== 1st Test ===
10–14 June
Scorecard

South Africa	v	West Indies
352 (129.4 overs); Mark Boucher 69 (146); Sulieman Benn 5/120 (47 overs)		102 (47.1 overs); Narsingh Deonarine 29 (78); Dale Steyn 5/29 (14 overs)
206/4d (62 overs); Graeme Smith 90 (173); Sulieman Benn 3/74 (25 overs)		293 (80.3 overs); Chris Gayle 73 (106); Dale Steyn 3/65 (17.3 overs)

South Africa won by 163 runs
Queen's Park Oval, Port of Spain, Trinidad
Umpires: Asad Rauf (Pak) and Steve Davis (Aus)
Player of the match: Dale Steyn (SA)

- South Africa won the toss and elected to bat
- Rain reduced play to 34 overs on Day 1.

=== 2nd Test ===
18–22 June
Scorecard

South Africa	v	West Indies
543/6d (147 overs); AB de Villiers 135* (168); Shane Shillingford 3/193 (52 overs)		546 (181.1 overs); Shivnarine Chanderpaul 166 (357); Morné Morkel 4/116 (34.1 overs)
235/3d (94 overs); Jacques Kallis 62 (128); Shane Shillingford 2/80 (30 overs)

Match drawn
Warner Park, Basseterre, St Kitts
Umpires: Asad Rauf (Pak) and Simon Taufel (Aus)
Player of the match: Shivnarine Chanderpaul (WI)

- South Africa won the toss and elected to bat

=== 3rd Test ===
26–30 June
Scorecard

West Indies	v	South Africa
231 (73.5 overs); Dwayne Bravo 62 (104); Johan Botha 4/56 (19.5 overs)		346 (134.4 overs); Ashwell Prince 78* (262); Sulieman Benn 6/81 (46.4 overs)
161 (65.1 overs); Shivnarine Chanderpaul 71* (179); Morné Morkel 3/33 (14.1 overs)		49/3 (8.4 overs); Hashim Amla 25 (20); Kemar Roach 3/22 (4.4 overs)

South Africa won by 7 wickets
Kensington Oval, Bridgetown, Barbados
Umpires: Steve Davis (Aus) and Simon Taufel (Aus)
Player of the match: Johan Botha (SA)

- West Indies won the toss and elected to bat
- Brandon Bess made his test debut for West Indies
