= Belfield, Guyana =

Belfield
- Village
- Location in Guyana
- Coordinates: 6°44′N 57°58′W
- Country: Guyana
- Region: Demerara-Mahaica

Population (2012)
  - Total: 630
- Time zone: UTC-4
- Climate: Af

Belfield is a village in the Demerara-Mahaica Region of Guyana, standing on the Atlantic coast, three kilometres west of Enmore. An extension of the Demerara-Berbice Railway connecting to Belfield was built in 1854.

Belfield was once home to the Belfield Girls' School, a school for delinquent girls, founded in 1949.
