= Bartica =

- Town and regional capital
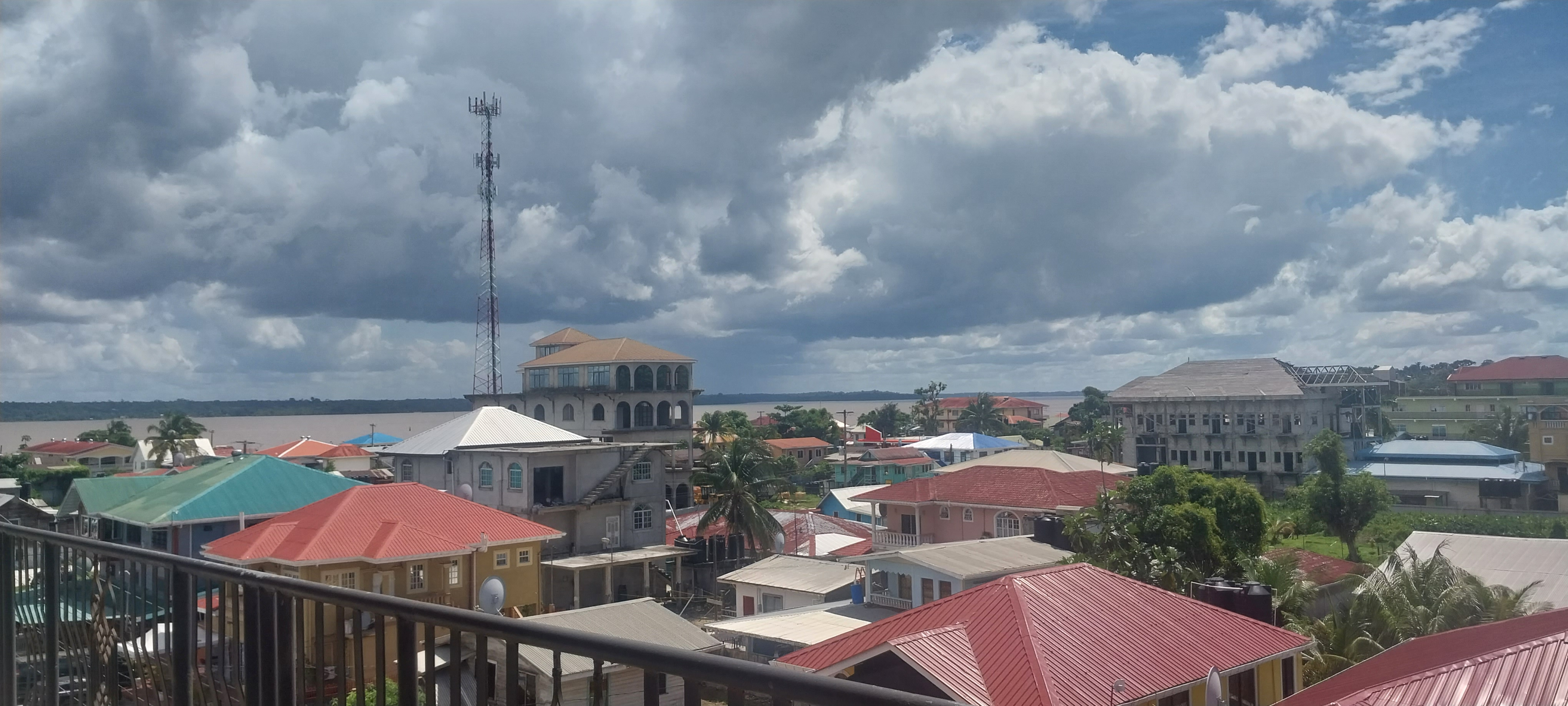
- View of Bartica in January 2024
- Etymology: Red Earth
- Nickname: Gateway to the Interior
- Location in Guyana
- Coordinates: 06°24′N 58°37′W
- Country: Guyana
- Region: Cuyuni-Mazaruni

Population (2012)
  - Total: 8,004
- Demonym: Bartician
- Climate: Af

Bartica is a town located on the west bank of the Essequibo River in Cuyuni-Mazaruni (Region 7), at the confluence of the Cuyuni and Mazaruni Rivers with the Essequibo River in Guyana. It is the regional capital of Cuyuni-Mazaruni.

Considered the "Gateway to the Interior", the town has a population of 8,004 as of 2012, and is the launching point for people who work in the bush, mining gold and diamonds.

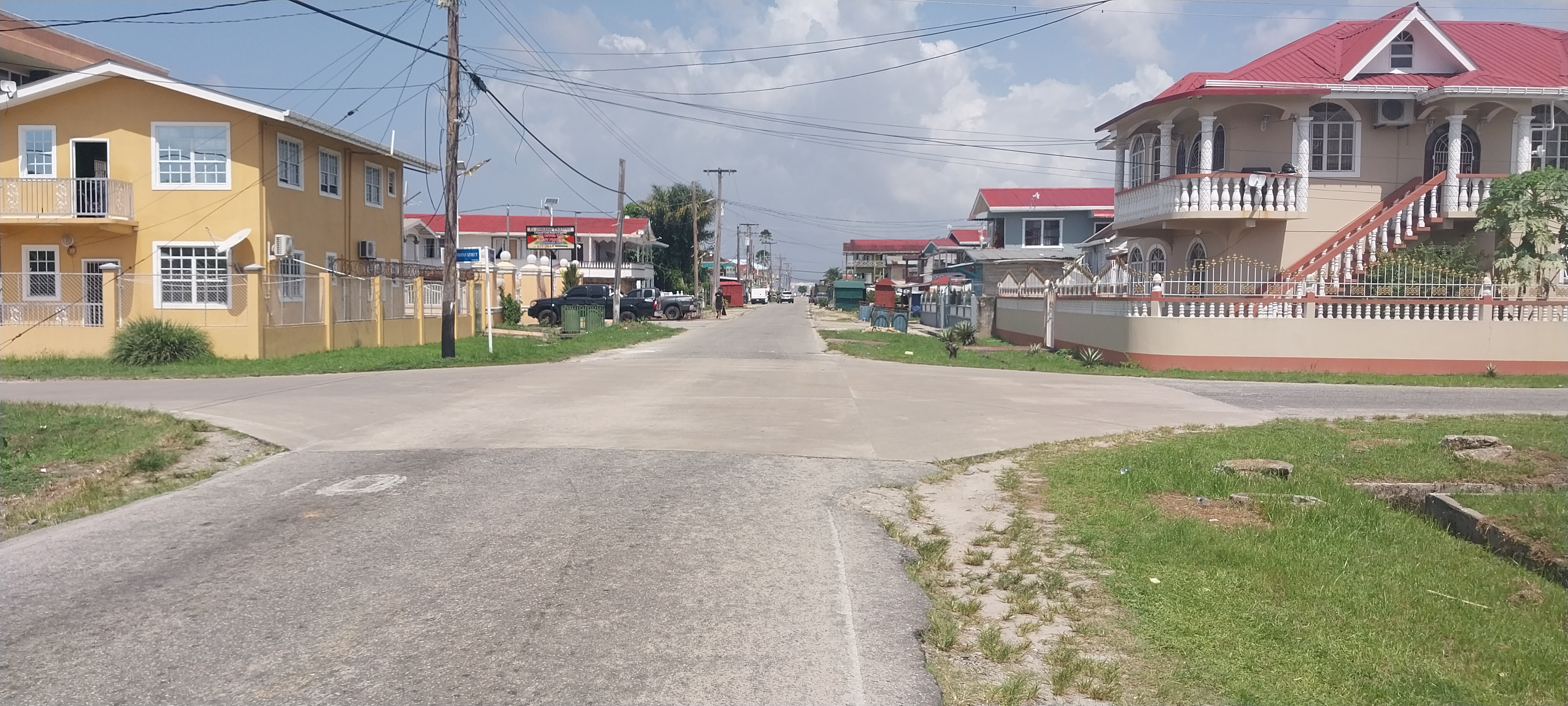
Third Avenue in Bartica central area

== History ==
The town developed from an Anglican missionary settlement, established in 1837, and consecrated in 1843. The name Bartica comes from an indigenous word meaning "red earth", abundant in the area. According to the Georgetown Daily Chronicle of July 30, 1892, the ornithologist Whitely died in his camp on the Annie Scapy River near Bartica. He was in a state of delirium from malaria and also depressed by the loss of his bird hunting haul when his boat sank. This was probably the reason why he eventually shot himself.

== Education ==
Bartica has two secondary school Bartica Secondary and Three Miles Secondary and three primary schools, St. Anthony's Primary and St. John-the-Baptist and Two Miles Primary. There are several other primary schools in the surrounding riverine communities.

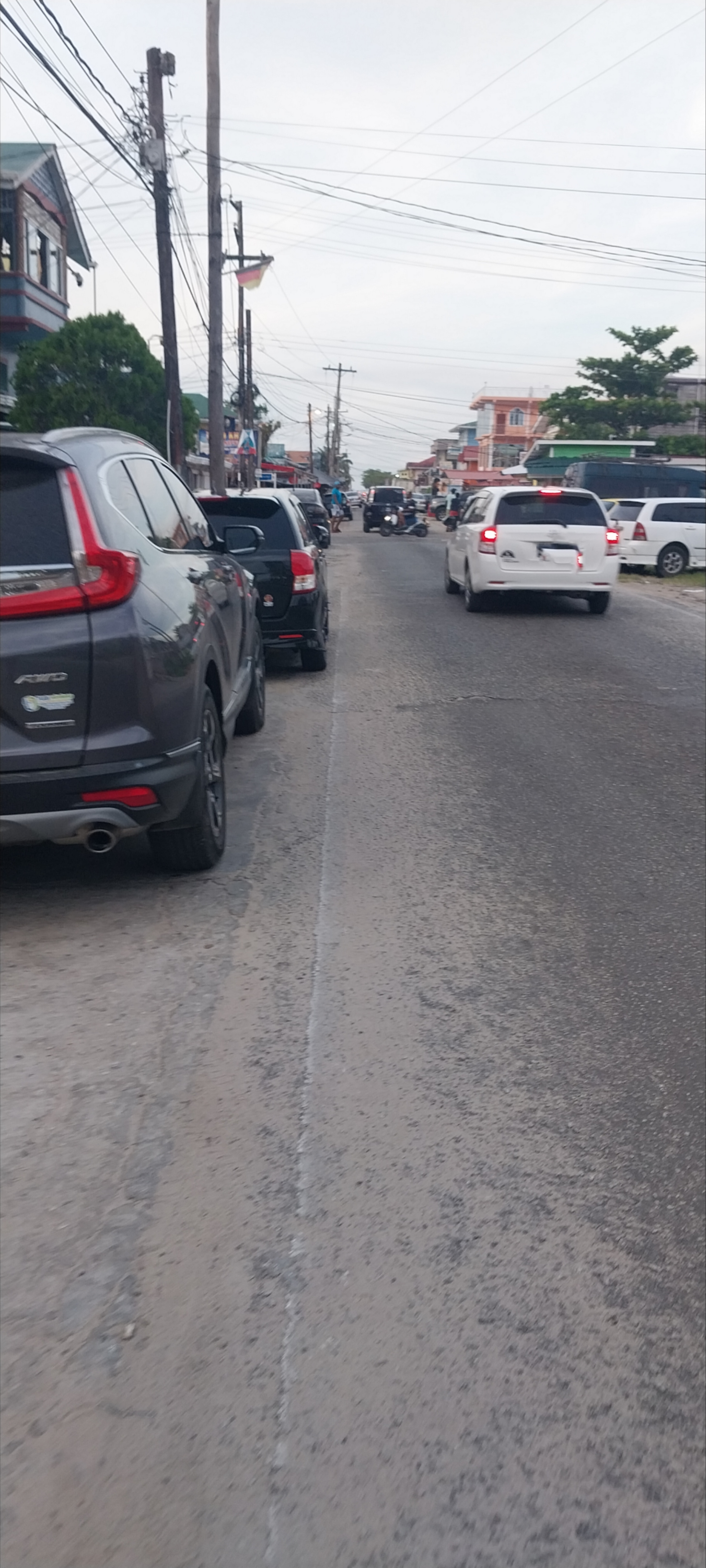
Road in Bartica

== Health ==
The region 7 hospital is located in Bartica and is known for having implemented the country’s first electronic Health Information System in 2005, developed by Peace Corps volunteers Geoffrey Thompson and Jason Knueppel.

== Tourism ==
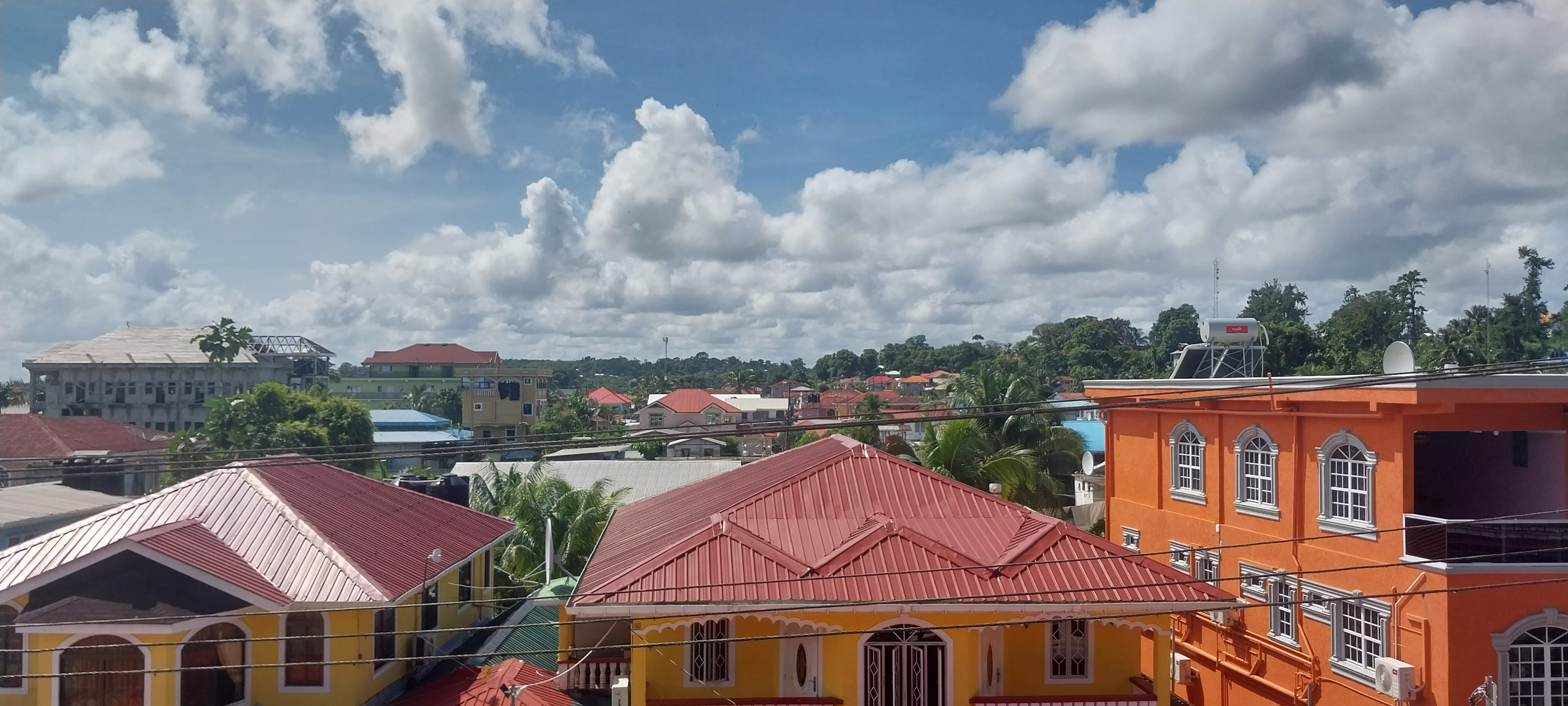
View from a building located in fifth street.

Bartica can be reached from Parika, Essequibo and Linden, Demarara. The Denham Suspension Bridge, also known as the Garraway Stream Bridge, links Bartica to Mahdia.

Bartica Airport is 6 kilometres (3.7 mi) southwest of the town.

North of Bartica lie the ruins of the Dutch fort Kyk-Over-Al, former government seat for the County of Essequibo. Bartica is also close to Marshall Falls.

There are several hotels in the town including the Platinum Inn, The New Modern Hotel, Balkarran's Guest House (D factor to D interior), and Zen's Plaza. There is also a thriving nightclub located in the Modern Hotel building.

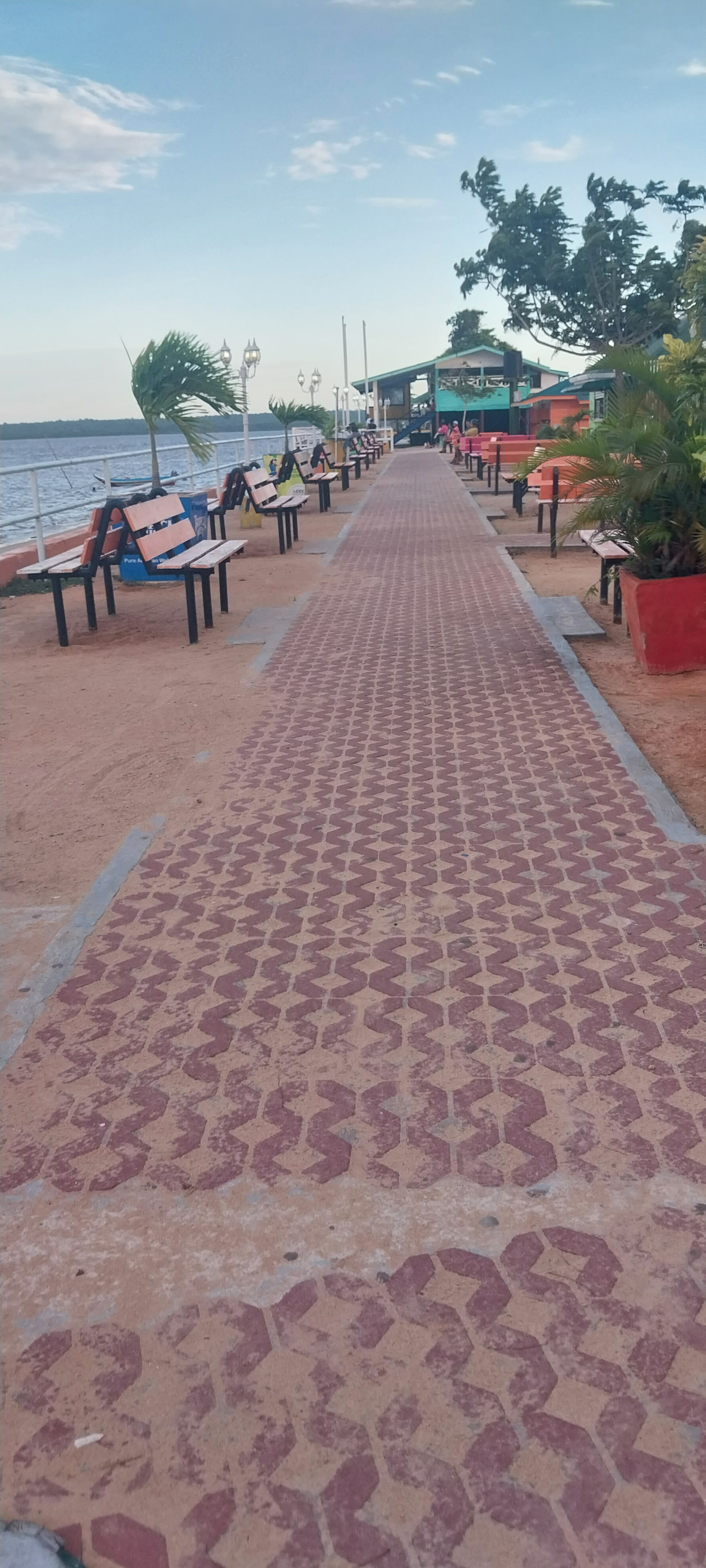

Several Brazilians live in Bartica, so one can find Brazilian restaurants and bars. There are several restaurants as well as local fast food joints.

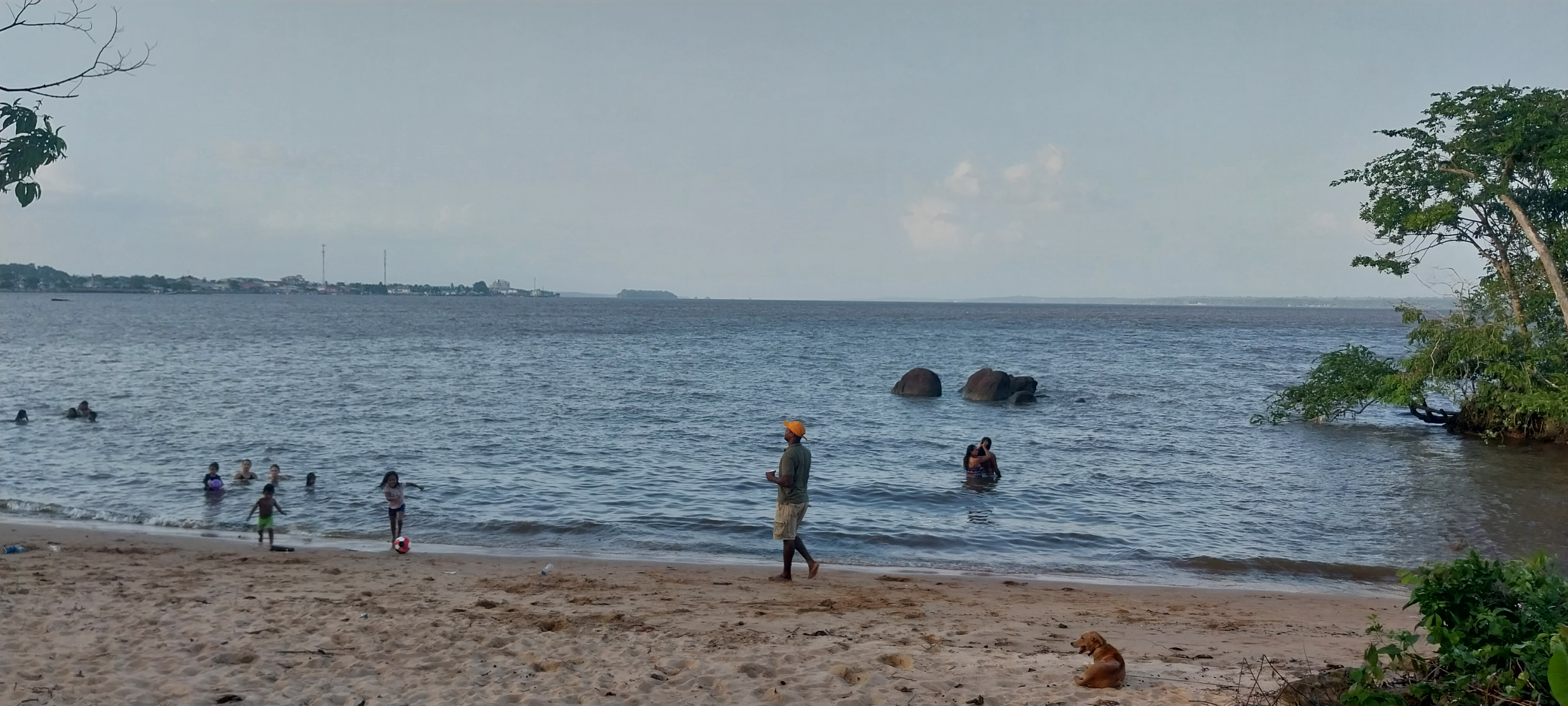
The Point beach in Byderabo area.

There are also several resorts around the Bartica area including Baganara Island Resort, Aruwai H2O Resort, Shanklands (not open at the moment), Whitewater and a Guesthouse in Byderabo. From Bartica, persons can also gain access to pristine riverain communities to experience the true indigenous way of life.

Bartica hosts the Bartica Regatta annually during Easter weekend.

== Climate ==
Bartica has a tropical rainforest climate (Köppen: Af).

Climate data for Bartica
Month	Jan	Feb	Mar	Apr	May	Jun	Jul	Aug	Sep	Oct	Nov	Dec	Year
Mean daily maximum °C (°F)	28.1 (82.6)	28.3 (82.9)	28.9 (84.0)	29.2 (84.6)	28.9 (84.0)	28.8 (83.8)	29.3 (84.7)	30.2 (86.4)	31.0 (87.8)	30.7 (87.3)	29.7 (85.5)	28.6 (83.5)	29.3 (84.8)
Daily mean °C (°F)	25.0 (77.0)	25.1 (77.2)	25.6 (78.1)	26.0 (78.8)	25.9 (78.6)	25.7 (78.3)	25.8 (78.4)	26.5 (79.7)	27.1 (80.8)	26.9 (80.4)	26.3 (79.3)	25.5 (77.9)	26.0 (78.7)
Mean daily minimum °C (°F)	22.7 (72.9)	22.8 (73.0)	23.1 (73.6)	23.6 (74.5)	23.8 (74.8)	23.5 (74.3)	23.5 (74.3)	23.8 (74.8)	24.2 (75.6)	24.2 (75.6)	23.9 (75.0)	23.2 (73.8)	23.5 (74.4)
Average precipitation mm (inches)	168.0 (6.61)	110.5 (4.35)	113.0 (4.45)	164.5 (6.48)	316.5 (12.46)	343.2 (13.51)	300.0 (11.81)	210.7 (8.30)	127.7 (5.03)	150.3 (5.92)	201.3 (7.93)	217.9 (8.58)	2,423.6 (95.43)
Source: Weather.Directory

== Notable people ==
- Frank Bowling (1934-), an abstract painter.
- Dianne Ferreira-James (1970-), international FIFA referee
- Ivor Mendonca (1934-2014), a West Indian cricketer
- Kaysia Schultz (1997-), a West Indian cricketer

== Massacre ==
On the 17th of February 2008 Bartica was allegedly attacked by Rondell Rawlins' heavily armed gang. Twelve people, including three policemen, were shot dead as the gang terrorized the town. The Bartica Police Station was overrun by the gunmen during the rampage and several business places robbed during the hour-long mayhem. The gang and attack is believed to linked to the Lusignan Massacre three weeks earlier. The perpetrators were killed on August 28, 2008 at one of their hideouts near the Guyanese capital Georgetown in a shootout with the police.
