= Better Hope =

- Village
- Location within Guyana
- Coordinates: 06°48′38″N 58°05′26″W
- Country: Guyana
- Region: Demerara-Mahaica

Population (2012)
  - Total: 4,491
- Time zone: UTC-04:00 (GYT)

Better Hope is a village located in the Demerara-Mahaica region of Guyana. The village has been named after the Plantation Betterhoop. It was originally a fishing village with many working on the sugar estates and nearby farms. The majority of the population is Indo-Guyanese with a minority of Afro-Guyanese.

In 2018, a road was named in honor of Moses Dwarka, a competitive marathoner born in the town. Moses represented British Guiana in the 1959 Pan American Games.
