= Ashton Chase =

Guyanese politician (1926–2023)

Ashton Chase OCE, SC

Member for Georgetown South
- In office 1953–1953

Minister of Labour, Industry, and Commerce
- In office 1953–1953
- Monarch: Elizabeth II
- Governor: Alfred Savage
- Preceded by: Position created
- Succeeded by: Interim government

Personal details
- Born: July 18, 1926
- Died: July 10, 2023 (aged 96)
- Party: Political Affairs Committee

Ashton Chase (18 July 1926 – 10 July 2023) was a Guyanese politician, activist, and lawyer. He was a founding member of the Political Affairs Committee of British Guiana in 1946, the precursor to the modern day People's Progressive Party, alongside Cheddi Jagan, Janet Jagan, and Jocelyn Hubbard. In 1953, Chase served as the Minister of Labour, Industry, and Commerce of British Guiana. At the time of his death in 2023, he was the last surviving founder of the PAC.

== Political career ==
In 1946, at the age of 20, Chase co-founded the Political Affairs Committee (PAC). The group's bulletin was printed in his kitchen. He was instrumental in the formation of the People's Progressive Party (PPP) in 1950. After the PPP's victory in the 1953 elections, Chase was elected to the national assembly, and subsequently appointed Minister of Labour, Industry, and Commerce at the age of 26, a position he held until the British government suspended the constitution later that year. He was President of the Senate of British Guiana from 1961 to 1963, and an elected member of the Parliament of Guyana from 1964 to 1968.

== Legal career and activist work ==
Chase became barrister-at-law in Gray's Inn in 1957. He served as the president of the National Association of Agricultural Commercial and Industrial Employees, an organization which advocated for trade unions and electoral democracy. Chase was also the founder of the Guyana Legal Aid Clinic, which provided legal services free of charge. He was president of Guyana Labour Union from 1961 to 1963.

== Personal life and death ==
Chase was born on 18 July 1926 in Georgetown, British Guiana and raised in the Werk-en-rust area. In October 2000, Chase was awarded the Order of Excellence, the highest national award in Guyana.

Chase died on July 10, 2023, at the age of 96. His funeral was attended by president Irfaan Ali. At the time of his death, Chase was the last surviving member of the Political Affairs Committee.
