= Bertram Charles =

Caribbean playwright

- Born: 4 September 1937; Victoria, British Guiana
- Died: 11 November 1994 (aged 57)
- Education: Goldsmiths College, London University
- Occupations: Playwright; Theatre director/producer, Teacher
- Years active: 1955–90

Bertram Israel Augustus Charles (4 September 1937 – 11 November 1994) was an influential Caribbean playwright who, with the theatre company he founded, Related Arts Group, wrote and produced plays in Georgetown, Guyana. Between 1963 and 1971 he produced sixteen one act and full-length plays at The Theatre Guild of Guyana Playhouse, including The End of the Affair (1968), The Alexin of Our Cure (1969) and Within Our Narrow Walls (1971). Today, in print, there are five Bertram Charles plays in 10 publications held by 42 libraries around the world, including The Library of Congress, Washington, D.C., The British Library and the University of Toronto.

== Education and career ==
Born in Victoria, British Guiana, Bertram Charles was active in Guyanese theatre from 1955, and travelled to London to attend Goldsmiths College, London University, to study, Literature, Speech and Drama. In London he joined a theatre company attached to The Park Lane Theatre called Related Arts Group. He took part in several productions there, as well as in student productions at Goldsmiths. He returned to Guyana and his home village, Victoria in 1963 and organised a series of Creole Breakfast Mornings (Breakfast with a Purpose) with the aim of attracting and inspiring his local arts community and forming a local version of the Related Arts Group. With the Related Arts Group of Victoria and with the encouragement of Frank Thomasson and Ken Corsbie he began writing and contributing productions at The Theatre Guild's Playhouse. Alongside Harold Bascom, Francis Quamina Farrier, Frank Pilgrim, Ian McDonald, Ian Vals, Sheik Sadeek and Paloma Mohamed, Charles contributed to one of Guyanese theatre's most productive eras. He also worked as a teacher, possibly at Alleyne's High School in Georgetown.

== Style, influence and legacy ==
Joycelynne Loncke cites Charles as one of the pioneers of social commentary in Guyanese theatre in her section of Beacons of Excellence. In 2012, journalist Al Creighton said about Charles, "He is known among Guyanese playwrights for his distinctive interest in the mysteries of human existence. His mostly one-act plays are deeply existentialist with a tragic sense, and universal rather than identifiably local in setting." In 1969, Clifford Stanley of the Guyanese Chronicle described his play The Alexin of our Cure as "a tense compassionate drama underlining the power of the mind" and, Another place somewhere, as a "tough and hard-hitting" portrayal of the plight of an “un-accommodated” Man. Guyanese playwrights, Harold Bascom and Ronald Hollingsworth both cite Charles as a major influence. Today, Ras Michael, Ed Creighton Ronald Hollingsworth and many others, recognise that Charles and his work at The Theatre Guild of Guyana contributed to a golden age of Guyanese theatre that has yet to be equalled. Not only that, over 50 years after Bertram's original Creole breakfast event in Victoria village, they are still being held. Ewalt Ainsworth reminisced in his 2015 blog: "the origin of the breakfast morning in Guyana as a home spun device by teacher/ playwright/ community activist Bertram Charles who had migrated in 1955 and returned twelve years later with a purpose".

== Productions ==
- The End of the Affair, Theatre Arts Guild, 1968
- The Alexin of Our Cure, Theatre Arts Guild, 1969
- Another Place Somewhere, Theatre Guild Playhouse, with Charlyn De Burst as Jeane, 1969
- Within our Narrow Walls, Theatre Arts Guild, 1971
- Papa's Idol, Theatre Arts Guild, 1990
- The Ties That Bind, Theatre Arts Guild, 1990

== Books ==
- Our Dilemma and Other Stories, Guyana, 1970
- The Alexin of Our Cure, two editions 1960, 1970,
- The End of the Affair, 1968,
