= Den Amstel =

- Village
- Location in Guyana
- Coordinates: 6°51′N 58°15′W
- Country: Guyana
- Region: Essequibo Islands-West Demerara

Population (2012)
  - Total: 938
- Time zone: UTC-4
- Climate: Af

Den Amstel is a village in Guyana's Essequibo Islands-West Demerara region. It lies on the Atlantic coast, approximately 13 kilometres (8.1 mi) west-north-west of the capital, Georgetown. The village has a population of 938 people as of 2012, who are predominantly Afro-Guyanese.

== History ==
Den Amstel is situated on the site of a coffee plantation of the same name, which was established by a Dutchman, John Craig, and named after the river Amstel in the Netherlands. The plantation was abandoned midway through the 19th century, owing to repeated flooding, and subsequently purchased by a syndicate of 125 ex-slaves, who gained ownership in 1854. In 1892, Den Amstel was united with the neighbouring village of Fellowship and granted municipal government for the first time, as part of the Den Amstel/Fellowship Village District. Fellowship was historically the more important of the two villages, with Den Amstel being described as "a very under-developed settlement with a few scattered houses and dense bushes and foliage". Until the closure of the line in 1974, the village had a platform on the Demerara–Essequibo Railway (running from Vreed-en-Hoop to Parika). The railway has since been replaced by a paved highway. Den Amstel's economy has historically been based around agriculture and horticulture, but now relies more on small businesses. The southernmost portion of the village includes a 400 acres (1.6 km^{2}) rice plantation.

== Sport ==
The Den Amstel Cricket Club is a member of the West Demerara Cricket Association, which is in turn affiliated with the Demerara Cricket Board, one of the three constituent members of the Guyana Cricket Board. Rayon Griffith, who played cricket for the Guyanese national team in the 2000s, was born in the village. However, a 2014 Guyana Chronicle article reported that cricket had declined in popularity, in favour of football. The Den Amstel Football Club is a member of the West Demerara Football Association, and qualified for the GFF Elite League on at least one occasion.
