= Buxton, Guyana =

Buxton
- Village
- Buxton-Friendship Village
- Location within Guyana
- Coordinates: 6.783°N 58.033°W
- Country: Guyana
- Region: Demerara-Mahaica
- Settled: 1840

Population (2012)
  - Total: 2,973

Buxton is a village in the Demerara-Mahaica Region of Guyana, standing about midway between Georgetown and Enmore.

== History ==
Buxton Village was founded in 1840 by a group of freed Afro-Guyanese, who purchased the former Plantation New Orange Nassau, and named it after Fowell Buxton. Friendship, its sister village, was founded in 1841 after the purchase of Plantation Friendship. The two were later joined to form the village of Buxton-Friendship, which is commonly called Buxton. Buxton Village was founded when a group of 128–132 former slaves from Annandale purchased the 580-acre plantation for 50,000 dollars. The 700-acre Friendship plantation was purchased by 168 former slaves for 80,000 dollars. Buxton, Friendship, Victoria, along with other villages, were all collectively purchased by groups of former slaves after emancipation was enacted in 1838.

The Buxton-Friendship local authority was established to interact with plantation owners, in addition to building roads, trenches and other similar infrastructure they also formed an elected village council. In 1856, the British Guiana legislature gave the government the right to enact improvement taxes on the properties of the villagers, this led to a stalemate between the government and the purchasers of Buxton.

In 1862, the governor of British Guiana confiscated the property of James Jupiter, Blucher Dorsett, Hector John, Webster Ogle, Chance Bacchus and James Rodney Sr, leading to riots. After the governor refused to hear the complaints of the delegations from Buxton, six village leaders set sail for England to air their grievances to the Queen. After arriving in Barbados, the Barbadian governor met with the delegation and advised his counterpart to absolve their properties of tax duties. This betrayal upset the other villagers, it also threatened the well-being of the members of the delegation who claimed they were not aware of the contents of the letter. In another effort to settle this dispute, some villagers led by Nana Culley decided to blocked the train carrying the governor, and force him to listen to their grievances. With his train surrounded by angry villagers, the governor promised that Buxtonians would be exempt from these levies.

During the pre-independence period, Buxton-Friendship was the site of some ethnic violence, including the two murders that are blamed for triggering the Wismar Massacre, most of the East Indian population of Buxton moved to the nearby villages of Annandale and Lusignan. During the 2000s, Buxton was the supposed base of the criminal gangs blamed for the increase in murders and other violent crimes in Guyana. Buxton once was considered to be highly affected by external criminal influences but has since been stabilized and is generally crime free and safe.

== Agriculture ==
Buxton sits on very fertile land which is surrounded by an irrigation system. Local farmers produce a variety of fruits and vegetables including peas, beans, Dakar (Tamarind) and the Buxton Spice mango. This mango is unique to Buxton being fleshy and sweet like others but having a unique spicy taste. There are a variety of fish in the water including the Tilapia.

== Notable people ==
- Winifred Gaskin (1916–1977), former Minister of Education
- Kerwin Kofi Charles (b.1970), Labor economist and Dean of The Yale School of Management.
- Abdul Kadir (1952-2018), politician, convicted terrorist.

== See also ==
- Queenstown
