= Rayon Griffith =

West Indian cricketer (born 1979)

Personal information
- Full name: Rayon Lindsay Griffith
- Born: 9 January 1979 (age 47); Den Amstel, Guyana
- Batting: Right-handed
- Bowling: Right-arm fast-medium

Domestic team information
- Years: Team
- 1999/00–2006/07: Guyana

Career statistics
Competition	First-class	List A
Matches	22	22
Runs scored	329	50
Batting average	18.27	12.50
100s/50s	–/1	–/–
Top score	82*	17*
Balls bowled	3,387	840
Wickets	56	22
Bowling average	29.30	29.77
5 wickets in innings	1	–
10 wickets in match	–	–
Best bowling	6/44	2/23
Catches/stumpings	6/–	4/–
- Source: Cricinfo, 14 October 2011

Rayon Lindsay Griffith (born 9 January 1979) is a West Indian cricketer who played 22 first-class and 22 list A games for Guyana between 1999 and 2007.
