= Annandale, Demerara-Mahaica =

Annandale
- Location in Guyana
- Coordinates: 6°46′N 58°1′W
- Country: Guyana
- Region: Demerara-Mahaica

Population (2012)
  - Total: 1,305

Annandale is a community in the Demerara-Mahaica region of Guyana, located on the Atlantic Ocean between Buxton, and Lusignan. Many of the inhabitants originally came from the Lusignan estate, while the former slaves of the plantation, bought the neighbouring Orange Nassau plantation and named it Buxton. Annandale is mainly an Indo-Guyanese community. It is divided in Annandale North, South, West and Courabane Park. The economy used to be dependent on the nearby sugar estates. The secondary school for the region is located in Annandale.
