= Balram Singh Rai =

Guyanese politician (1921–2022)

Minister of Home Affairs
- In office 1961–1962
- Preceded by: office established
- Succeeded by: Ptolemy Reid

Minister of Community Development and Education
- In office 1959–1961
- Preceded by: Brindley Benn
- Succeeded by: Cheddi Jagan

Personal details
- Born: Balram Singh Rai; 8 February 1921 Beterverwagting, British Guiana
- Died: January 2022 (aged 100) Oxford, England
- Party: People's Progressive Party (PPP); Justice Party

Balram Singh Rai (8 February 1921 – January 2022) was a Guyanese politician. He served as Minister of Community Development and Education from 1959 to 1961, then the first Minister of Home Affairs from 1961 to 1962.

== Education and early career ==
Rai was born on 8 February 1921 in Beterverwagting Village on the East Coast of Demerara, the child of Ramlachan and Radha Rai. They are Hindus of the Arya Samaj denomination from which Rai never deviated by all accounts.

He passed his Junior and Senior Cambridge exams at the age of 13, and 16, respectively, and received an LLB degree with honors from the University of London. One early prominent position he held was Vice President of the Civil Service Administration in 1949. While a civil servant, he promoted the then PPP leader, Cheddi Jagan, as a candidate for the 1947 General Election. In 1952, Rai was called to the bar at Middle Temple.

== Political affiliations ==
Rai entered politics when Guyana had three major rival parties—The People's Progressive Party (PPP), The People's National Congress (PNC), and The United Force (UF). He sided with the PPP, but later he made a controversial move to form his own party, the Justice Party. The controversy ranged over jobs, race, power, and corruption. Rai’s party, however, could not penetrate the market share of the established parties—PPP, PNC, and UF. In the 1964 general election, the JP got only 1,334 votes, less than a percent, and not amounting to a seat in parliament.

== Parliamentary years ==
Rai represented Central Demerara in parliament during the 1957-1964 period. During 1959-1961 he was Minister of Community Development and Education, and during 1961-1962 he was Minister of Home Affairs. In November 1970, he went into voluntary exile, living at Ealing, London, UK.

== Political achievements ==
As Minister of Education, he abolished the dual control of school, and brought the denomination schools under government control. This achievement aimed to disallow indoctrination of students into other faiths. He chose a merit system to fill government positions. This is sometimes called a policy of “Guianization,” which did not discriminate among the nation's six nationalities. On the human-rights side, he ordered the police to step down from their aggressive policy of shooting people perceived as creating disturbances during the Black Friday Riot incident of 16 February 1962.

== Death ==
Rai died in Oxford, England during the second week of January 2022, at the age of 100.
