= Triumph, Guyana =

Georgetown
- Village and regional capital
- Location in Guyana
- Coordinates: 6.80873°N 58.05654°W
- Country: Guyana
- Region: Demerara-Mahaica

Population (2012)
  - Total: 3,788
- Time zone: UTC-4
- Climate: Af

Triumph is a village and regional capital of the Demerara-Mahaica region in Guyana.

Paradise used to be the regional capital, however the administrative building burnt down in 2006. In 2009, a decision was made to rebuild in Triumph, which has therefore become the regional capital.

In 1842, the area next to Beterverwagting was bought by Lambert Christian and named Triumph. Christian ran into financial problems, and the people of Beterverwagting tried to buy the land in two terms. The government stepped in and bought the land. The villagers aided by the local newspaper resisted, but to no avail. Triumph and Beterverwagting have since then grown together, and are often referred to as Beterverwagting/Triumph. Both villages are under the same local government.

Triumph has a branch of Republic Bank.
