= Egbert Martin =

19th-century Guyanese poet

- Born: c. 1861; Georgetown, British Guiana (modern Guyana)
- Died: June 23, 1890 (aged 29); Georgetown, British Guiana
- Resting place: Le Repentir Cemetery, Georgetown
- Occupation: Poet
- Writing career
- Pen name: Leo
- Language: English
- Years active: 1881–1890

Egbert Martin (c. 1861 – June 23, 1890), writing under the alias Leo, was a 19th-century Guyanese poet.

His poetry deal mostly with spiritual topics, while also focusing on the themes of African-Guianese history. Recurring themes of his works include change, disintegration, and death, which have been frequently associated with his frail health condition. Martin was highly regarded by contemporary critics and is considered as Guyana's first major poet, despite his death from tuberculosis at the age of 29. He is regarded as the founder of modern Guyanese literature.

== Life ==
Martin was born in Georgetown, British Guiana, to a journeyman tailor. Guyanese poet and essayist A. J. Seymour described him as "a fair Mulatto" (implying a mixture of White and Afro-Guyanese ancestry) who from his early youth was "confined to an invalid's bed, as a result of illness." He had a cousin named Edwin Heyliger, suggesting German ancestry.

When he was 19, Martin's poetry was published in Guianese journal The Colonist, and he contributed to other publications such as The Argosy and Echo between 1881 and 1890. In 1887, he won a kingdom-wide competition at an event organised by the London Standard to commemorate Queen Victoria's Golden Jubilee, for appending two verses to the British national anthem. Despite being bed-ridden, he was sponsored by the editor of The Argosy newspaper, James Thompson, and the mayor of Georgetown, George Anderson Forshaw. Martin was the first poet to write about the landscape of Guyana.

He died aged 29 from tuberculosis.

== Reception and legacy ==
During his time, Martin was lauded by contemporary critics. The Daily Chronicle hailed him as "the ablest of poetical writers of whom British Guiana can boast". Similarly, The Berbice Gazette considered Martin a poet "whose works plainly bespeak talent and ability of a high order", while the Guiana Herald pointed out "the name and merits of Leo are so well known that comments are scarcely requisite". However, Martin's works have also been viewed as a "weak imitation of Wordsworth, mixed with Tennyson, with a flavouring of Edgar Allan Poe".

Arthur Schomburg called Martin "one of the greatest Negro poets in history". Scriptology, his collection of short stories, was missing for 100 years until a copy was located at Howard University. Martin is regarded as the founder of modern Guyanese literature.

== Works ==
- Leo's Poetical Works (1883) (OCLC 59536839)
- Leo's Local Lyrics (1886) (OCLC 990705298)
- Scriptology (1885), short stories (ISBN 9781907493782)
- Selected Poems of Egbert Martin (2010), The Caribbean Press, The Guyana Classics Library – Government of Guyana (ISBN 978-1-907493-05-8)
