= Silver Hill, Guyana =

Silver Hill Moblissa Newton
- Village
- Location in Guyana
- Coordinates: 6°10′00″N 58°16′00″W
- Country: Guyana
- Region: Demerara-Mahaica

Population (2012)
  - Total: 251 (Note: Census population includes Dalgin & Conception. The population of the village proper was <100 according to Stabroek News)
- Time zone: UTC-4
- Climate: Af

Silver Hill (also Moblissa Newton) is a very small settlement in the Demerara-Mahaica Region of Guyana, 48 km (30 mi) up the Soesdyke-Linden Highway, which runs along the east bank of the Demerara River.

The village has a school, but has no electricity other than private Diesel generators.

Recently the area has been developing with resorts, agriculture and farming technology in the area. A few miles before Silver Hill is the Dalgin region that possess peanuts, watermelon and other fruit farmers.
