= Political Affairs Committee (British Guiana) =

1946–1950 political party in British Guiana

The Political Affairs Committee (PAC) was a political party in British Guiana.

== History ==
The PAC was formed on 6 November 1946 by Cheddi Jagan, Janet Jagan, Ashton Chase and Jocelyn Hubbard. On the same day it started producing the PAC Bulletin, printing 60 copies. The bulletin was usually published once or twice a month. The party called for the introduction of universal suffrage and self-government, fair wage rules and land reform. However, the press supporting the colonial regime labelled the PAC as a communist front.

The party put forward three candidates for the 1947 general elections, the Jagans and Hubbard, although they contested the elections as independents. Cheddi Jagan contested the Central Demerara seat against John D'Aguiar (the incumbent), HL Palmer and Frank Jacob; Jagan won with 31% of the vote. Janet Jagan contested Georgetown Central constituency, finishing second, whilst Hubbard ran in Georgetown North, losing after a campaign marred by racism.

On 1 January 1950 the PAC merged with the British Guiana Labour Party to form the People's Progressive Party.
