= Cove and John =

- Village
- Location in Guyana
- Coordinates: 6.75486°N 57.97388°W
- Country: Guyana
- Region: Demerara-Mahaica

Population (2012)
  - Total: 494
- Time zone: UTC-4
- Climate: Af

Cove and John is located on the Atlantic coast of Guyana (East Coast of Demerara), 18 miles east of Georgetown and bordered by Nabacalis to the west and Victoria to the east. It has a population of 494 people as of 2012. This village has the Guyana Sevashram (Hindu Temple).

== Location ==
It is located about 19 miles southeast of the capital city Georgetown. The Atlantic Ocean sits to the North; and some of the country's largest rice fields are just beyond its southern horizon.

== Culture ==
The population is over 90% Indo-Guyanese with a small group of Chinese and Amerindian families. The culture is very similar to that of the rest of the British Caribbean, but with, according to the locals, an East Indian flair.

In the beginning, the culture of Cove and John resembled very much that of India, but as African and Chinese relocated to the village a slight variety was added. The residents of Cove and John, Indo-Guyanese, Afro-Guyanese, and Chinese Guyanese brought their foods, traditions, religion and customs with them.

Over the years, the population of Indians has lost their mother tongue completely, and although Indian music remains very popular, the English language, with a slight Creole touch, has taken complete control. No one speaks Hindi anymore in Cove and John, and it is considered a dead language.

== Public Services ==
Cove and John has two primary schools and one high school. The schools are Cove and John Primary School, St. Andrew's Primary School, and the Hindu College. Women's Leadership Institute in Cove and John hosts workshops on business and self-reliance. The village also has a police station and magistrate's court.

Cove and John Ashram is a significant location of worship during Maha Shivaratri.

== Seawall ==
This small village is protected from the Atlantic Ocean by large concrete seawalls. The main pump station pumps water out whenever rain falls.
