= Helena, Guyana =

Helena
- Village
- Location in Guyana
- Coordinates: 6.6731°N 57.9272°W
- Country: Guyana
- Region: Demerara-Mahaica

Population (2012)
  - Total: 1,568

Helena is a village in the Demerara-Mahaica Region of Guyana. Administratively the village is subdivided in Helena No.1 and Helena No.2 and is part of the Mahaica subregion.

== History ==
Helena started as a sugar plantation. By 1896, the plantation was abandoned and purchased by the government of British Guiana to be divided into small lots. The settlement initially suffered from neglect, because many of the owners did not live in the village. In 1848, construction started on the Demerara-Berbice Railway linking Georgetown with New Amsterdam. In August 1864, the railway reached Helena where the Mahaica station opened. The station remained the terminus until 1890 when work resumed. The railway closed in 1972.

== Overview ==
The economy of Helena is mainly based on farming. Helena has a primary school, and a private secondary school. The village has one church and two mandirs. In 2008, a statue of Sir James Douglas, the first governor of British Columbia, was unveiled in front of the former railroad station, because he was born and raised in the region.
