= 1935 British Guiana general election =

General elections were held in British Guiana on 3 September 1935.

== Electoral system ==
The elections were held in accordance with the 1928 constitution, which established the Legislative Council, reducing the proportion of elected members and increasing the number of members appointed by the government. The 30-member Legislative Council consisted of the Governor, two ex-officio members, eight official members, five unofficial members and 14 members elected in single-member constituencies.

== Results ==
| Constituency | Elected member |
|---|---|
| Berbice River | Joseph Eleazar |
| Central Demerara | John Ignatius De Aguiar |
| Demerara-Essequibo | Jung Bahadur Singh |
| Demerara River | Arthur George King |
| Eastern Berbice | Edward Alfred Luckhoo |
| Eastern Demerara | Hubert Chester Humphrys |
| Essequibo River | Alfred Railton Crum Ewing |
| Georgetown Central | Percy Claude Wight |
| Georgetown North | Frederick Jacob Seaford |
| Georgetown South | Joseph Gonsalves |
| New Amsterdam | Eustace Gordon Woolford |
| North Western District | Charles Ramkissoon Jacob |
| Western Berbice | Peer Bacchus |
| Western Essequibo | Sydney Howard Seymour |
Source: Parliament of Guyana

== Aftermath ==
The first meeting of the newly elected Council was held on 15 October. As there were no elections until 1947, the elected Legislative Council became known as the "Long Parliament".
