= William N. Arno =

Educator and writer

William Nicholas Arno (December 7, 1878 – 1979) was an educator and author in Guyana. He wrote a book about Victoria Village, the settlement developed by former slaves that became Victoria, Guyana. He served as president of the Guyana Teachers Association.

He was born in Victoria, in what was then British Guiana, to a schoolmaster. He had five daughters and three sons and lived in 286 Irving Street in Georgetown.

In his book on Victoria Village, Arno wrote about the 83 people who bought an abandoned cotton plantation to establish a village for themselves and others who had been enslaved on sugar plantations until 1834 and then forced to work for another four years until 1838. The Guyana Heritage Society reprinted the book and others including The Twelve Views in the Interior of Guiana by Robert Schomburgk, Centenary history and handbook of British Guiana by Albert R. F. Webber, and Story of Georgetown by James Rodway.

== Writings ==
- History of Victoria Village, East Coast Demerara (1964, republished 1966 and 1999)
