= Hyde Park, Guyana =

Hyde Park
- Village
- Location in Guyana
- Coordinates: 6°30′N 58°16′W
- Country: Guyana
- Region: Demerara-Mahaica

Population (2012)
  - Total: 245
- Time zone: UTC-4
- Climate: Af

Hyde Park is a community in the Demerara-Mahaica Region of Guyana. It stands on the right bank of the Demerara River, at two metres above sea level, about 40 km upstream from the river's mouth, and Georgetown. Cheddi Jagan International Airport, is nearby.
