= Clonbrook =

- village
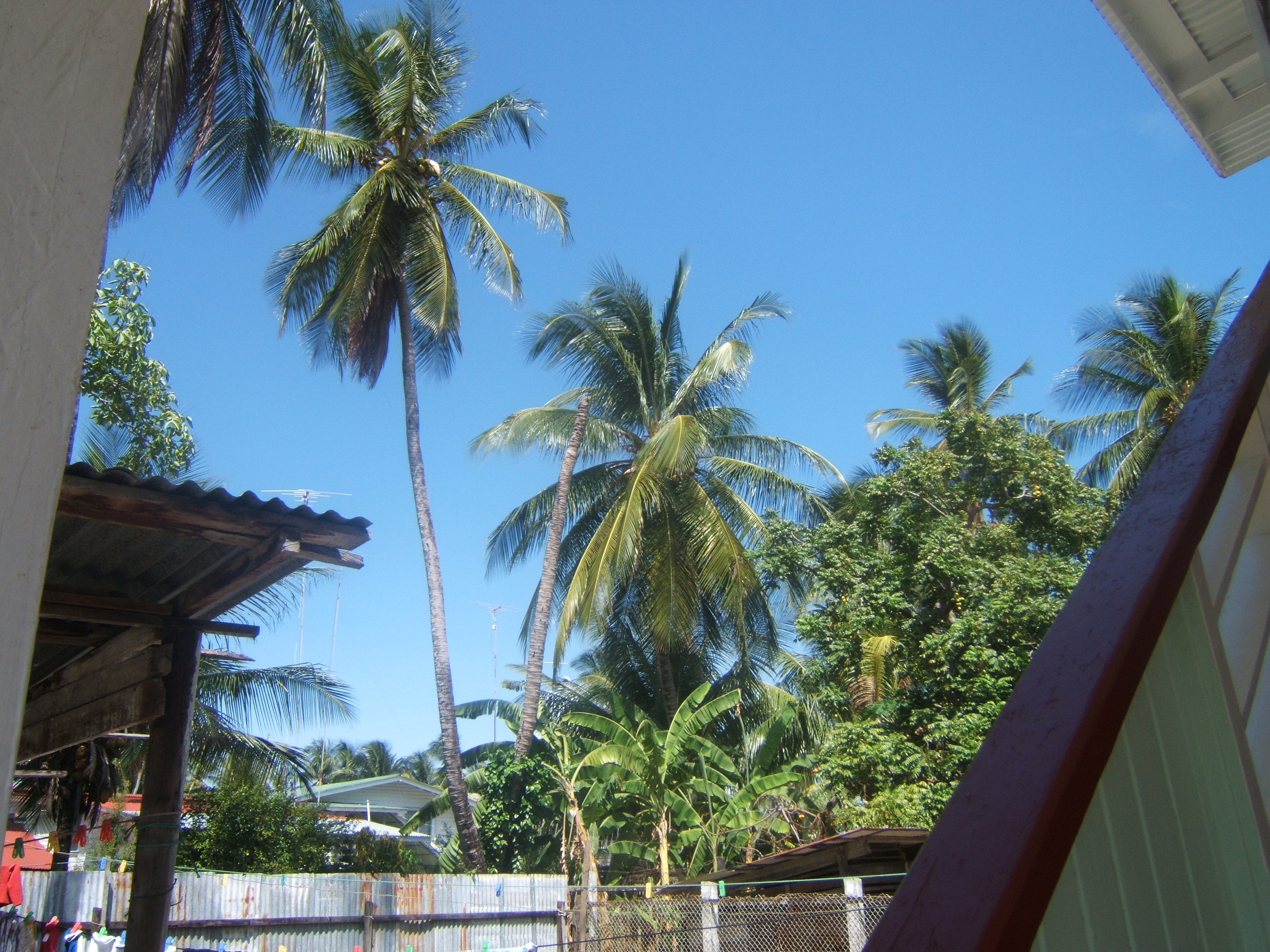
- Palm Trees in a Clonbrook backyard

- Location in Guyana
- Coordinates: 6°44′N 57°56′W
- Country: Guyana
- Region: Demerara-Mahaica

Population (2012)
  - Total: 1,193
- Time zone: UTC-4
- Climate: Af

Clonbrook is a village in the Demerara-Mahaica region of Guyana. The village itself has a population of about 1,193 as of 2012. The village is located along the East Coast Highway and is about 16.5 miles from Georgetown and about 6 miles from Mahaica. It is bordered in the east by the village of Bee Hive and by Ann's Grove in the west.

The area is susceptible to flooding and a producer of coconuts.

== History ==
The village name comes from the Dutch that settled in the area in the eighteenth century. It was invaded by the English in 1802, taken over by John Croal and became a sugar estate until the factory burnt down later that year. It was rebuilt in 1895, but yet again the plantation was struck by fire.

The village was once a stop on the now-defunct rail line. It was opened in August 1863, and the remnants of the station rest near the current post office.

When the government purchased the village in the 1900s, it was laid out as a land settlement scheme and parceled out to the Indian indentured labourers in lieu of return passage to India, becoming a Land Settlement Scheme for East Indians in 1908. In 1937, it merged with Ann's Grove and Two Friends villages, but separated again in 1939 due to lack of cooperation.

The remainder of the village is occupied by the Doch Cab Cooperative Society.

== Transportation ==
One can travel to Clonbrook using the #44, #50 buses or by private taxis.

== Public Services ==
The village contains a Mosque, two churches, and the Vishnu Mandir, all within proximity to each other. There is also a primary school, Clonbrook Government School, and a community centre ground. Backdam Nursery and Primary along with the Ann's Grove Secondary School also serve to educate children of Clonbrook. The village has a post office and health centre, the closest hospital is in Nabaclis.
