= Whitely =

Whitely is both a surname and a given name. Notable people with the name include:

- Anthony Leslie Whitely (born 1928) Photographer Perth and Adelaide, Australia
- Bessie Marshall Whitely (1871–1944) American composer, pianist and teacher
- Charlie Whitely (1904–1953), Australian rules footballer
- Henry Whitely (1844–1892 (or 1893)),[as an English naturalist and explorer. He was particularly interested in ornithology and entomology.
- Johanna Whitely (born 1828) First lay woman to found a Catholic school in Western Australia and has a small park named after her in York, Western Australia
- John Francis Whitely (born 1858), First Deputy Federal Commissioner of Land Tax in Perth, Western Australia
- Martin Whitely (born 1959), Australian politician
- Whitely King (19th century), Australian activist

== See also ==
- Whitley (disambiguation)
