= Nonpareil, Guyana =

Nonpareil Non Pareil
- town
- Location in Guyana
- Coordinates: 6°44′N 57°56′W
- Country: Guyana
- Region: Demerara-Mahaica

Population (2012)
  - Total: 2,946
- Time zone: UTC-4
- Climate: Af

Nonpareil also Non Pareil (from the French and meaning matchless, inimitable) was the name of a sugarcane plantation, and later a village, on the east coast Demerara Region of Guyana that operated until the mid 20th century. Although the factory and village were torn down and disassembled in the 1940s, its population survived and formed the majority of the population of Enterprise, a modern village located one mile away from the site of old Nonpareil.

== History ==
In 1838, the first group of Indians built their first homes in the area surrounding Nonpareil Estate, and arose a village whose residents called it Nonpareil. By the end of the 19th century a small school and a hospital were erected, and other incentives like land ownership were offered to encourage workers to stay with the estate. Workers striking the estate moved to a new site, which became Enterprise, was located one mile to the northeast and was not entirely unoccupied when people from Nonpareil migrated there, circa 1949. Most residents are still employed by the sugar estates.

== See also ==
- Enterprise for more information on the descendants of Nonpareil.
