= Lusignan, Guyana =

Lusignan
- Location within Guyana
- Coordinates: 6.792893°N 58.044561°W
- Country: Guyana
- Region: Demerara-Mahaica

Population (2012)
  - Total: 1,868
- Time zone: UTC-4

Lusignan is a community in Demerara-Mahaica region of Guyana and approximately 16 km from the capital city Georgetown. Located on the East Coast of Demerara, it has a population of 1,868 as of 2012 mostly Indo-Guyanese.

The village is sustained by subsistence farming and fishing. Ecotourism is also an emerging industry.

== Residents ==
Its most famous expatriates are Ramkumar and Tapearee Singh who moved to Lusignan during the disturbance in the 1960s. Singh moved his house, board by board, from Golden Grove - with help from Stella the Donkey. Singh was a gentleman farmer with extensive land holdings in the Golden Grove, back dam and Georgetown. They parented 11 children.

== Services ==
It is home to the Lusignan Golf Course, Guyana's only golf course, and there is also a community centre which houses the Lusignan Cricket Club and a Dental Surgery. The village constitutes a market square, supermarket, and pharmacy, and one of the Guyana's five maximum security prisons. Transportation for the village is via a railway embankment and the major East Coast highway, and connects the community to the capital city.

The village has a nursery and primary school, and secondary schooling is provided in Annandale.

== Lusignan Massacre ==
The community was brought to international attention following what has become known as the Lusignan Massacre, in which 11 persons, including 5 children, were killed after a group of heavily armed gunmen led by Rondell "Fineman" Rawlins stormed the village.
