= Rondell Rawlins =

Guyanese gangster and mass murderer

Rondell "Fineman" Rawlins (c. 1975 – August 28, 2008) was a Guyanese gang leader and fugitive believed responsible for a number of crimes in the South American nation. Rawlins was implicated in the murder of Guyanese Agriculture Minister Satyadeow Sawh on April 22, 2006, along with Sawh's brother and a security guard. On January 26, 2008, Rawlins and his men killed eleven people, including five children, in an attack on the village of Lusignan in what is known as the Lusignan Massacre. On February 17, the gang carried out the Bartica Massacre, when they attacked the town of Bartica, Essequibo, and killed 12 people including three police officers.

Rawlins believed that his missing girlfriend had been abducted by the government, thus motivating the massacres.

The Guyanese government put a reward of 50 million Guyanese dollars (US$250,000) on Rawlins and launched a nationwide manhunt. The search for Rawlins came to an end on August 28, 2008, when police found Rawlins at one of his hideouts near the capital city of Georgetown. Police shot and killed Rawlins and two other gang members in the shootout that followed.
