= Paradise, Guyana =

Paradise
- Location within Guyana
- Coordinates: 6.7716°N 58.0002°W
- Country: Guyana
- Region: Demerara-Mahaica

Population (2012)
  - Total: 2,050
- Time zone: UTC-4

Paradise is a village located in the Demerara-Mahaica region of Guyana, and used to be its regional capital, however the administrative building burnt down in 2006, and the regional capital moved to Triumph. (Paradise is also the name of several other smaller villages in Guyana; one in Region 5, Region 10, and two in Region 2.)

Paradise has a primary school.

The village also had a team in the 592 Inter-Village Football Festival, a local event started in 2019 to encourage football in the East Coast Demerara area. The Paradise Invaders team plays in the Berbice Football Association (BFA) ‘West Berbice League.
