= Rosignol =

Village in Guyana

- village
- Location in Guyana
- Coordinates: 6°16′25″N 57°32′25″W
- Country: Guyana
- Region: Mahaica-Berbice

Government
  - Type: Neighbourhood Democratic Council
  - Chairman: Chate Ramnauth Puran

Population (2012)
  - Total: 2,939
- Time zone: UTC-4
- Climate: Af

Rosignol is a village on the west bank of the Berbice River in Mahaica-Berbice, Guyana.

The town is important because it has a port, the Rosignol Stelling, that used to be the main crossing point on the western bank of the Berbice River. Major bus lines include Route No. 56 from New Amsterdam to Rosignol and Route No. 50 from Rosignol to Georgetown. The East Demerara Highway will be extended out to Rosignol. New Amsterdam is on the east bank. The population consists primarily of people of Indian and African origin.

D’ Edward Village is associated with Rosignol. It is also a joint NDC with the village of Zeelust.

== Public Services ==
Rosignol has three schools, a nursery school called Liberty hall Nursery, Rosignol Primary and Rosignol Secondary school.

== Economy ==
Blairmont Estate is a major source of employment for the village.

Rosignol was home to two cinemas, the Atma and the Ritz (the latter of which burned down). On Saturdays, the village holds the biggest one-day market in the region. The huge Rosignol Fisheries is next to the stelling. There are two banks in the village. Sweet Lips Disco is the life of the small nearby village.

Another major attraction was Hollywood Bar (Naggy's), which was owned by Edward Barratt. There were also Iris Chan bar (Mr. Chan's rum shop), and at one time Rosignol hosted the only gas station for entire West Berbice.
