= Beterverwagting =

- Village
- Location in Guyana
- Coordinates: 6°48′N 58°04′W
- Country: Guyana
- Region: Demerara-Mahaica

Population (2012)
  - Total: 2,163
- Time zone: UTC-4
- Climate: Af

Beterverwagting, also Betterverwagting or abbreviated to B.V., is a village in Guyana, on the East Coast of the Demerara River.

== History ==
On 8 May 1840, 62 former slaves pooled their savings together and bought plantation Beterverwagting from Baron van Groningen. In 1842, Triumph was established to the east, Triumph and Beterverwagting have grown together, and are often referred to as Beterverwagting/Triumph. Both villages are under the same local government.

Beterverwagting is located roughly 10 miles from the capital, Georgetown, and is an important feeder village for the sugar estate in La Bonne Intention, a village adjacent to it. The name Beterverwagting comes from the Dutch words "Beter verwachting", literally "better expectation".

== Notable people ==
- Cy Grant (1919–2010), actor and singer
- Balram Singh Rai (1921-2022), politician
- Omari Glasgow (2003–), footballer
