= Demerara-Mahaica =

Region of Guyana

Coordinates: 6°45′N 57°59′W

Demerara-Mahaica Region 4
- Administrative Region
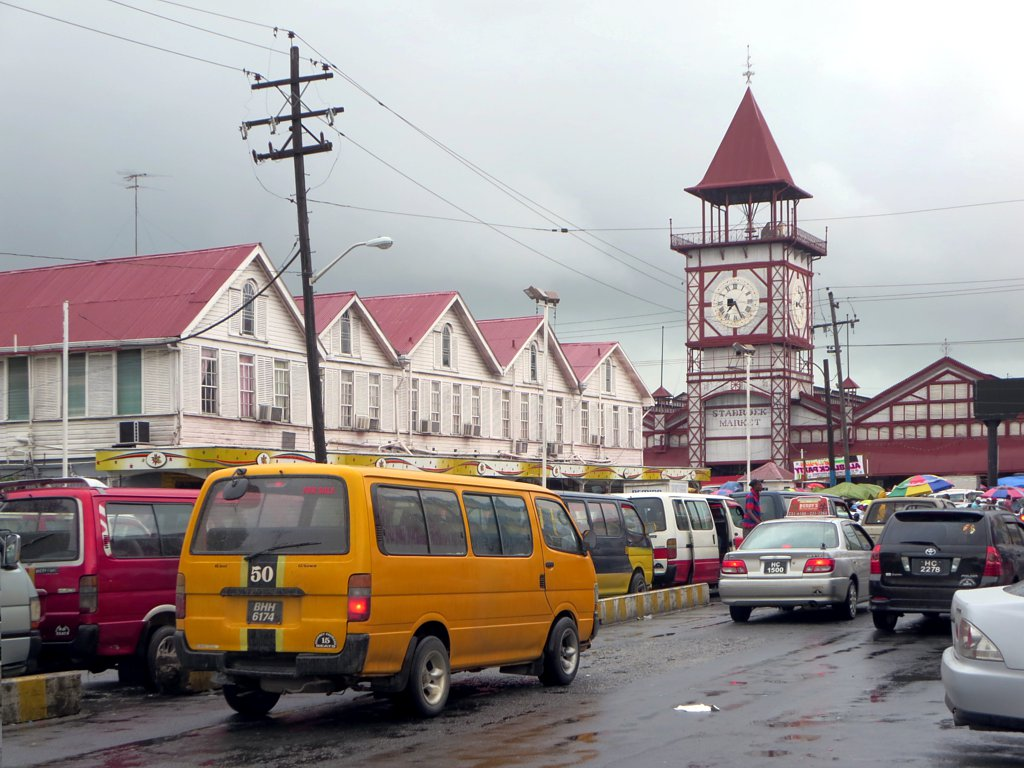
- Georgetown

- Flag

- Map of Guyana showing Demerara-Mahaica region
- Country: Guyana
- Capital: Georgetown

Area
  - Total: 2,232 km^{2} (862 sq mi)

Population (2022 census)
  - Total: 347,759
  - Density: 155.8/km^{2} (403.5/sq mi)
- Time zone: UTC-4

Demerara-Mahaica (Region 4) is a region of Guyana. Its capital is Georgetown, the national capital and largest city of Guyana. Located between the Mahaica, Demerara, and Moblissa rivers, it is spread over an area of 2,232 km^{2} (862 sq mi), and is the smallest region by area in Guyana. As per the 2022 census, it had a population of 347,759, making it the country’s most populous region. Georgetown hosts the major administrative and government buildings, and the Cheddi Jagan International Airport. The major economic activities include livestock rearing, agriculture, and manufacturing.

== Geography ==
Demerara-Mahaica (Region 4) is one of the ten administrative regions of Guyana. It is spread over an area of 2,232 km^{2} (862 sq mi), and is the smallest of the ten regions of Guyana by area. The region was established during the 1980 administrative reform of Guyana consisting of parts of the East Demerara-West Coast Berbice district. It extends from the east of the Demerara River to the west bank of the Mahaica River, and bound by the Moblissa River to the south. Its hosts the national capital, Georgetown, which is the major administrative, and commercial center. It hosts the government buildings, a major port, and the Cheddi Jagan International Airport.

The topography consists of mostly low lying coastal plains, with clay and sandy hills are present towards the south. The region has about 0.95 million hectares of forested area, covering about 45% of its land area.

The district has a tropical rainforest climate (Köppen climate classification: Af) with an average annual temperature is 28.06 °C (82.51 °F). The district receives an average annual rainfall of 11.56 cm (4.55 in) and has 229.6 average rainy days in a year.

== Demographics and economy ==
As per the official census in 1980, the region had a population of 317,475 inhabitants. It decreased to 296,924 in the 1991 census, before increasing to 310,320 during the 2002 census. As per the 2022 census, it had a population of 347,759 inhabitants. Majority of the population is concentrated along the coast, particularly in the capital city.

The major economic activities include livestock rearing, agriculture, and manufacturing. Major agricultural produce include rice, and fruits. Commercial industries include furniture, food processing, and textiles.

== Communities ==
List of communities and settlements:

- Ann's Grove
- Agricola Village
- Alberttown (ward of Georgetown)
- Albouystown (ward of Georgetown)
- Alexander Village (Alexanderville)
- Annandale
- Bagotstown
- Beehive
- Bel Air (Gardens / Park / Springs) (wards of Georgetown)
- Belfield (Belfield Village)
- Beterverwagting (Betterverwagting)
- Better Hope
- Bourda
- Buxton
- Campbelville
- Cane Grove
- Charlestown (ward of Georgetown)
- Clonbrook
- Cove and John
- Craig
- Zeeland
- De Kinderen (De Kindern)
- Enmore
- Enterprise
- Georgetown
- Glasgow (Glasgow Village)
- Good Intent
- Great Diamond
- Helena
- Houston
- Hyde Park
- Jonestown (Voorzigtigheid)
- Kingston, Guyana
- Kitty (ward of Georgetown)
- Kuru Kururu
- La Bonne Intention
- La Penitence (ward of Georgetown)
- Lacytown (ward of Georgetown)
- Lamaha Gardens
- Land of Canaan
- Little Diamond
- Lodge (Lodge Village)
- Lusignan
- Mahaica Village
- Meadow Brook Gardens
- Mon Repos
- Nabacalis (Nabaclis)
- New Burg (Newburg)
- New Haven
- Newtown (ward of Georgetown)
- Non Pariel (Nonpareil)
- Paradise
- Plaisance (Plaisance Village)
- Prashad Nagar
- Providence
- Queenstown (ward of Georgetown)
- Silver Hill
- Soesdyke (Soesdyk)
- Stabroek
- St. Cuthbert's Mission (Pakuri, St. Cuthbert's)
- Subryanville
- Timehri
- Triumph
- Unity
- Victoria
- Vigilance
- Werk-en-rust
- Wortmanville
