= Satyadeow Sawh =

Guyanese politician

Agriculture Minister of Guyana

Personal details
- Born: June 13, 1955 Guyana
- Died: April 22, 2006 (aged 50) Georgetown, Guyana
- Manner of death: Assassination

Satyadeow Sawh (Hindi: सत्यदेव शा) (June 13, 1955 – April 22, 2006) was the Agriculture Minister of Guyana and prominent Hindu politician in Guyana. He also served, at various times as ambassador to: Colombia, Venezuela, and Ecuador.

== Biography ==
Satyadeow Sawh (known popularly as "Sash") was born in Central Mahaicony, East Coast Demerara, Guyana in 1955. He was the last of nine children to his father, a rice farmer and businessman, and mother, a home-maker. He attended the Indian Education Trust College (later the Richard Ishmael Secondary School), where he sat the GCE O-levels and the College of Preceptors examinations. At 18, he migrated to Ontario, Canada, where he worked and pursued a bachelor's degree in Economics from York University. He married in 1982, and had two sons.

While in Canada he was vibrant in the Association of Concerned Guyanese, a political group promoting change in Guyana. He held the presidency of the group for many years. In 1993, he was appointed Guyana's ambassador to Venezuela. He served in the post for 3 years and was awarded the country's second highest honor, the Order of Francisco de Miranda (First Class) upon completion of his tenure. In 1996, he was recalled to Guyana by the late President, Dr. Cheddi Jagan, to serve as a minister within the Ministry of Agriculture. He became the Minister of Fisheries, Crops and Livestock, with responsibility for Forestry, and was later named the acting Minister of Agriculture, the designation which he held up to his death.

== Death ==
On April 22, 2006, he, his siblings (Phulmattie Persaud) and (Rajpat Rai Sawh), and security guard (Curtis Robertson) were killed in an attack on Sawh's home in LBI on the East Coast of Demerara. His death lead to wide outpouring of support for his family, amidst anger, fear and mourning among Guyanese both home and abroad.
