= Hubert Nathaniel Critchlow =

Guyanese trade unionist

Hubert Nathaniel Critchlow OBE (18 December 1884 – 14 May 1958) is notable as the founder of the modern trade union movement in Guyana.

== Background ==
Critchlow was born in Georgetown, Guyana. Little is known of his early childhood but in his late teens, after leaving school, he was a dock worker. At the age of 21, he began his struggle for the interest of waterfront workers' wage negotiations and rights. His struggle continued into 1917 when he founded the British Guiana Labor Union (BGLU). The BGLU is officially the first trade union in the Caribbean.

In 1945 he attended the World Trade Union Conference as President of the British Guiana Trades Union Council.

Often referred to as 'The father of Trade Unions', Critchlow was the first man in British Guiana to formalize labor negotiations. He died in Georgetown in 1958.

== Legacy ==
On 2 December 1964 then premier of Guyana, Cheddi Jagan, unveiled a bronze statue of Critchlow in the compound of the Parliament Building.

Hubert Nathaniel Critchlow devoted his life to changing the harsh conditions under which men were forced to work in those days. His work is especially remembered on 1 May, which is designated as:

- Labor Day
- Workers' Day
- May Day.

On this day, wreaths are laid at the base of Critchlow's statue by leaders of the government and prominent trades unionists. Workers parade through the streets of the township dressed in red and white. They march under the banner of their particular trade union in a show of solidarity for workers' rights
