= Werk-en-rust =

- Ward
- Location within Guyana
- Coordinates: 6°48′21.51″N 58°9′49.26″W
- Country: Guyana
- City: Georgetown

Population (2012)
  - Total: 3,699

Werk-en-rust, also Werken-Rust, (Work and Rest) is a ward in Georgetown, Guyana, located along the Demerara River that feeds into the Atlantic Ocean.

== History ==
Originally a plantation, it is located south of Stabroek, which began as a two-mile brick road with a row of houses on each side of the road.

By the end of the 18th century, the plantation was reduced as parcels of land were sold off to saw-millers. In 1798, it was a coffee plantation owned by Erve Weber & Co. A cemetery was established there, people began to settle in Werk-en-rust, and it became an extension of Stabroek by 1799. By 1812, Werk-en-rust was one of eight wards of a city called Germantown. The other wards were Charles Town, Cumingsburg, Kingston, Lacy Town, New Town, and Robb Town. The wards were created from the Eve Leary, Le Repentir, La Bourgade, and Vlissengen, and Werk-en-Rust plantations.

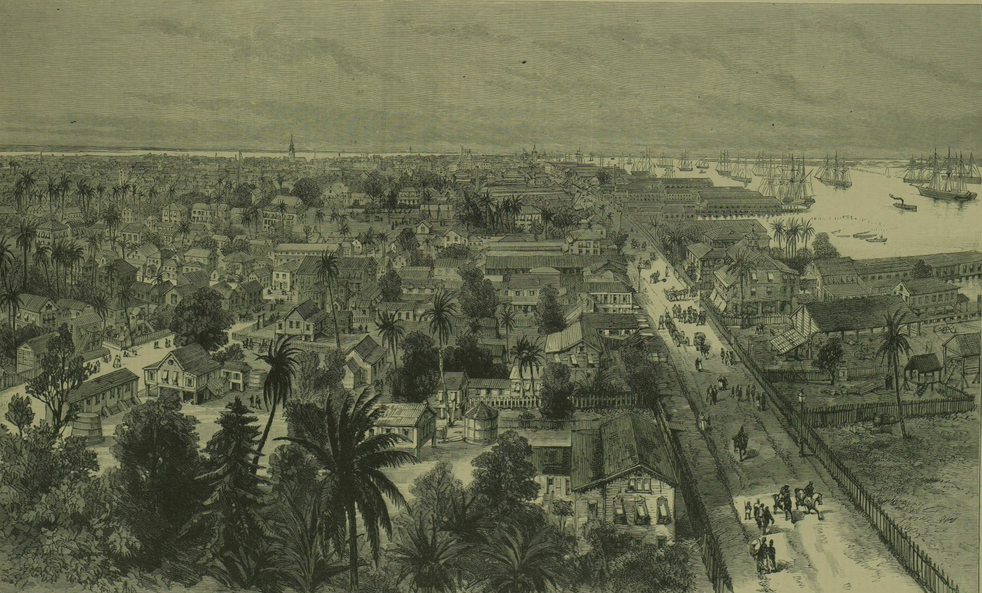
Georgetown, Demerara, 1888

In 1817, there were 49 female and 56 male enslaved people and the area was owned by the estate of Erve Weber. The estate was owned by H.J. C. Neuwieller in 1826. Richard Michael Jones owned the plantation by 1832. In 1832 and 1833, Werk-en-Rust was a coffee and plantain plantation with 35 male and 28 female slaves. At some point, it was a sugar plantation. By 1911, Werk-en-Rust was populated by Afro-Guyanese, Portuguese and Chinese citizens.
