= Enmore, Guyana =

Enmore
- Village
- Nickname: Enmore Seawall
- Location within Guyana
- Coordinates: 6.7069753°N 57.9302216°W
- Country: Guyana
- Region: Demerara-Mahaica

Area
  - Total: 5.2 km^{2} (2 sq mi)

Population (2012)
  - Total: 1,002
- Time zone: UTC-4 (GYT)

Enmore is a village in the Demerara-Mahaica region along the coastal belt of Guyana. It is about two square miles (5.1 km^{2}) in size and has a multi-ethnic population of 1,002 as of 2012.

== Public Services ==
The village contains an Arya Samaj and 3 other Mandirs, 2 Nursery Schools, 2 Primary Schools, 1 Private Secondary School and a Community Centre Ground.

== Enmore Sugar Estate ==
Enmore has a long history in sugar production.

On 16 June 1948, five workers were killed during a labor protest against the harsh conditions and low wages. Referred to as the Enmore Martyrs and buried at Le Repentir Cemetery in Georgetown, events are held annually to remember their sacrifice, and they are also included in the mural 'Memorabilia II' painted in 1976 at the National Cultural Centre.

The decline of the price of sugar pushed the government to try to privatize the industry. Enmore Estate includes 25 acres of freehold land, with 60,000 tonnes of sugar capacity, and factories. In 2018, many GuySuCo estates were closed, impacting 1,480 employees from the East Demerara Estate. In attempting to recover the sugar industry, the Enmore estate returned a small number of employees.

In February 2022 it was announced that the Enmore Sugar Packaging that has been dysfunctional since 2018 would be acquired by Guysons K+B Industries to provide Oil and Gas machining services, more specifically OCTG, Premium Accessory and Turnkey manufacturing services. Following the acquisition of 55 acres of former Enmore Sugar Estate lands, Guysons entered into a US$60 million joint venture with the United States equipment manufacturer K&B Industries to transform the packaging plant into a fabrication facility for the oil and gas industry forming GKB.

== Martyrs Monument ==
The Enmore Martyrs Monument was designed by Dennis Williams, which was erected by Zenith Industrial and Construction Co-operative Society at a cost of $10,000. It was unveiled by Prime Minister Linden Forbes Sampson Burnham on June 16, 1977, on the occasion of the 29th anniversary of the death of the five martyrs.
