= List of cities and towns in Guyana =

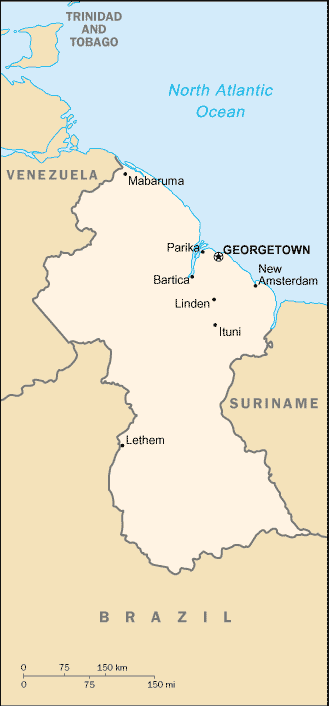
Map of Guyana

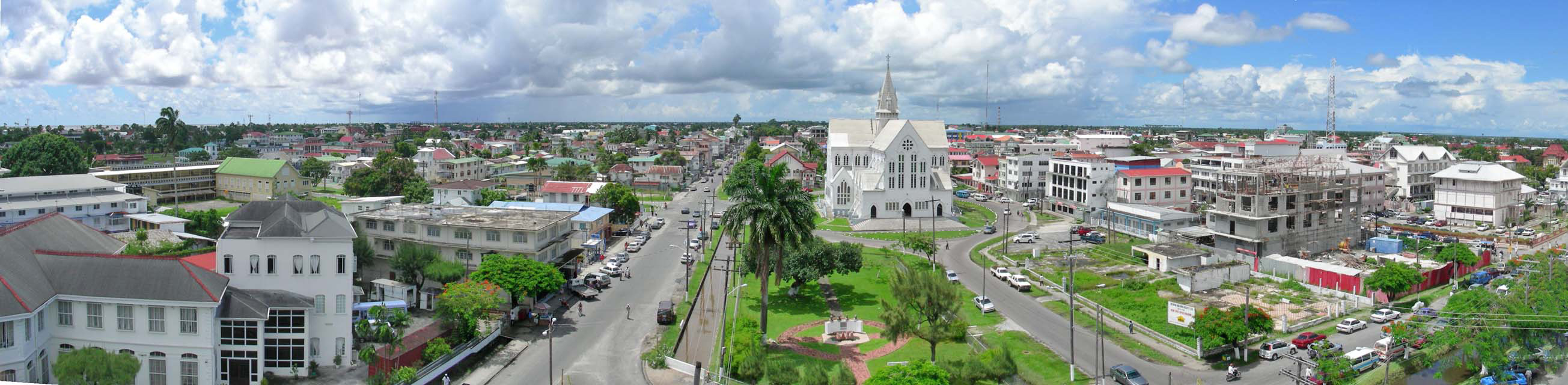
Georgetown, Capital of Guyana

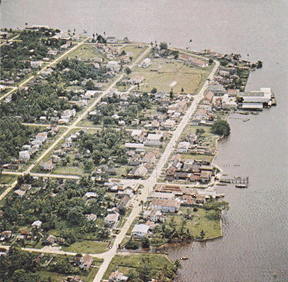
Bartica

This is a list of settlements in Guyana. The following definitions have been used:

- City: Any settlement listed at with population estimates of 75,000 or more.
- Town: Defined by the government of Guyana as 'municipalities'.
- Village: As defined by official government documents, census or gazetteers.
- Community: A settlement unlisted on government documents.
- Neighbourhood: Subdivisions of any of the above.
- Estate: Contiguous agricultural holding that is notable enough to have a Wikipedia article.
- Mission: Any such that is notable enough to have a Wikipedia article.

== Largest cities ==
Largest cities and towns of Guyana
Rank	Name	Region	Population
1	Georgetown	Demerara-Mahaica	118,363
2	Linden	Upper Demerara-Berbice	27,277
3	New Amsterdam	East Berbice-Corentyne	17,329
4	Corriverton	East Berbice-Corentyne	11,386
5	Bartica	Cuyuni-Mazaruni	8,004
6	Mahaica	Demerara-Mahaica	4,867
7	Timehri	Demerara-Mahaica	4,433
8	Rose Hall	East Berbice-Corentyne	4,413
9	Parika	Essequibo Islands-West Demerara	4,385
10	Triumph	Demerara-Mahaica	3,788

== Cities ==
- Georgetown - capital

== Towns ==
- Anna Regina (Region 2 capital)
- Bartica (Region 7 Capital)
- Corriverton
- Lethem (Region 9 capital)
- Linden (Region 10 capital)
- Mabaruma (Region 1 capital)
- Mahdia (Region 8 capital)
- New Amsterdam (Region 6 capital)
- Rose Hall

== Villages ==
=== Region 1 ===
- Assakata
- Baramita
- Hosororo
- Kamwatta Hill
- Kartabo
- Koriabo
- Kumaka, Barima-Waini
- Kwebanna
- Matthew's Ridge
- Morawhanna
- Port Kaituma
- Santa Rosa

=== Region 2 ===
- Adventure
- Annandale, Pomeroon-Supenaam
- Charity
- Hackney
- Hampton Court
- Kabakaburi
- Lima Sands
- Onderneeming
- Pickersgill
- Queenstown
- Spring Garden
- St. Monica Karawab
- Suddie
- Supenaam
- Wakapau

=== Region 3 ===
- Canal No.2
- Den Amstel
- Leonora
- Met-en-Meerzorg
- Parika
- Saxacalli
- Stanleytown, Guyana
- Stewartville
- Tuschen
- Uitvlugt
- Vergenoegenn
- Vreed en Hoop (Regional capital)
- Vriesland
- Windsor Forest
- Zeeburg
- Zeelandia

=== Region 4 ===
Success

- Annandale, Demerara-Mahaica
- Bee Hive
- Belfield
- Beterverwagting
- Better Hope
- Buxton
- Clonbrook
- Cove and John
- Enmore
- Enterprise
- Golden Grove, Guyana
- Helena
- Hyde Park
- Kuru Kururu
- Liliendaal
- Lusignan
- Mahaica
- Plaisance
- Providence
- Nabaclis
- Non Pariel
- Soesdyke
- St. Cuthbert's Mission
- Triumph (Regional capital)

Unity Village

- Victoria

=== Region 5 ===
- Belladrum
- Burma
- Esau and Jacob
- Fort Wellington
- Weldaad

=== Region 6 ===
- Albion
- Baracara
- Crabwood Creek
- Kasuela
- Kumaka, East Berbice-Corentyne
- Moleson Creek
- Orealla
- Port Mourant
- Rose Hall
- Skeldon

=== Region 7 ===
- Agatash
- Imbaimadai
- Issano
- Isseneru
- Kamarang
- Kurupung

=== Region 8 ===
- Campbelltown
- Mahdia (Regional capital)
- Micobie
- Monkey Mountain
- Paramakatoi
- Tumatumari

=== Region 9 ===
- Achiwib
- Aishalton
- Annai
- Apoteri
- Aranaputa
- Hiawa
- Kanashen
- Karasabai
- Karaudarnau
- Maruranau
- Nappi
- Rewa
- Sawariwau
- St. Ignatius
- Surama
- Yupukari
- Wowetta

=== Region 10 ===
- Ituni
- Kurupukari
- Kwakwani
- Rockstone

== Communities ==
- Abary
- Arakaka
- Bush Lot
- El Paso
- Governor Light
- Jonestown
- Long Creek
- Mora Point
- Noitgedacht
- Orinduik
- Princeville
- Silver Hill
- Tumatumari Landing

== Estates ==
- Catherinas Lust
- Dadanawa Ranch
- Wichabai

== Missions ==
- Bethany village
- Paruima
- Santa Mission

== See also ==
- Lists of cities by country
