= Pickersgill, Guyana =

Pickersgill
- Village
- Location within Guyana
- Coordinates: 7°15′22″N 58°43′21″W
- Country: Guyana
- Region: Pomeroon-Supenaam

Population (2015)
  - Total: 105

Pickersgill is a village in the Pomeroon-Supenaam (Region 2) of Guyana. It is located near the Pomeroon River.

The 2012 census has a population count of 105. Public healthcare is administered in adjacent towns, such as Charity (district hospital) or Suddie (hospital).

Pickersgill, originally a land-grant occupied by George Frederick (G.F) Pickersgill, was called the 'Botany Bay of Demerary' for the 'incorrigible', 'gaol birds' harboured there. Commercial woodcutting was established in the area in 1834, when George Frederick Pickersgill, ex-Justice of the Peace for North-West District (predecessor to modern Regions 1 and 2), and James Chapman operated a troolie (Thatch palm) and woodcutting business at the confluence of the Pomeroon and its tributary, the Arapiaco. Pickersgill Saw Mills Ltd. was a presence here, as well as in Pomeroon and Essquibo, and up to the 1950s a large sawmill remained at Pickersgill.

In 1887, due to Venezuelan encroachment on the British claim to Guiana, the Colonial Government installed police stations in the North Western district.

The Pomeroon area is known for producing coconuts and other cash crops, and Pickersgill has been of interest for agricultural improvement.
