= Jacklow =

- Village
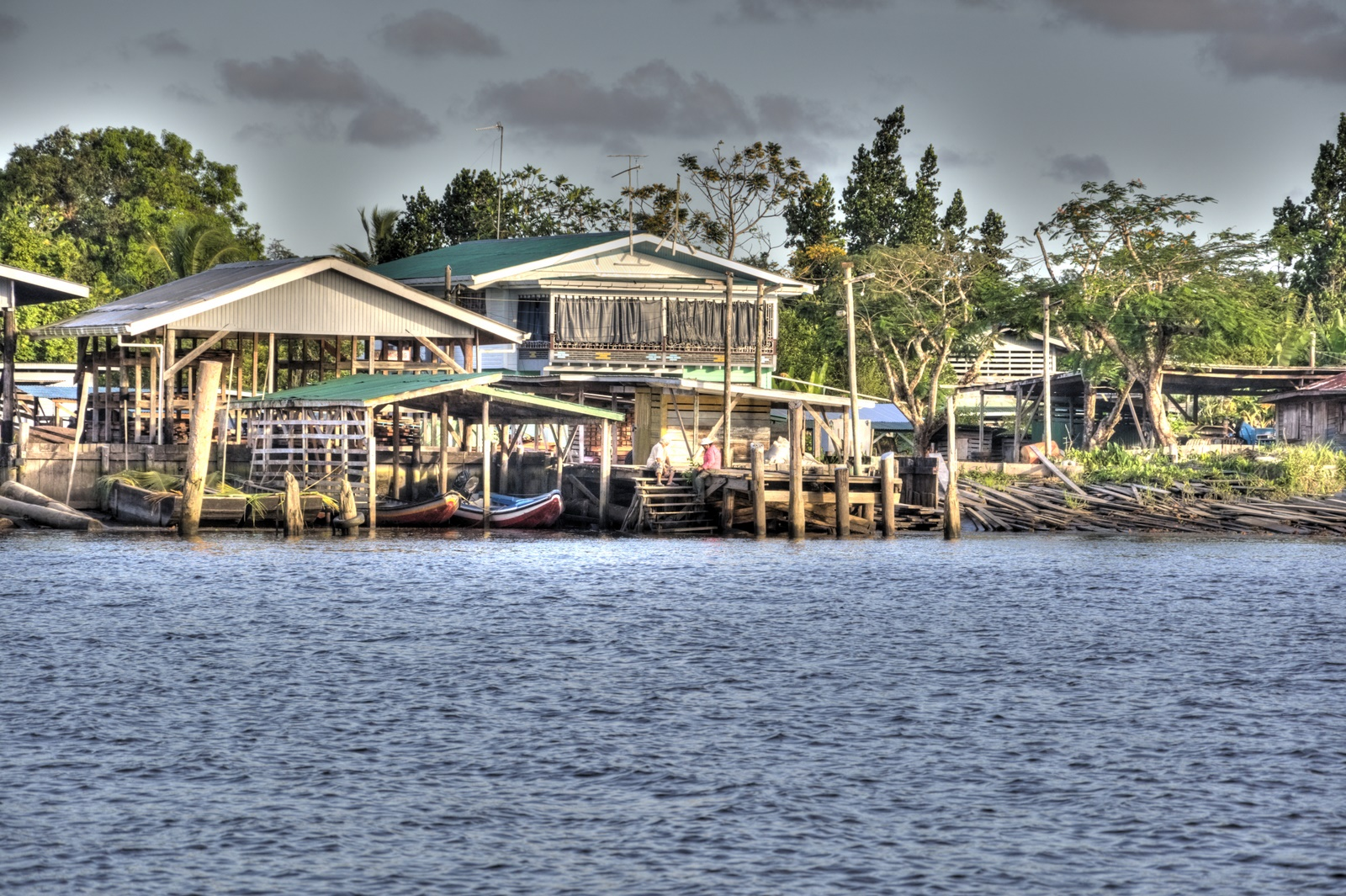

- Location in Guyana
- Coordinates: 7.3267°N 58.6618°W
- Country: Guyana
- Region: Pomeroon-Supenaam

Population (2012)
  - Total: 701

Jacklow is a village in the Pomeroon-Supenaam Region of Guyana. The village is mainly inhabited by Indo-Guyanese and Amerindian people. Jacklow is situated on the Pomeroon River.

== History ==
From 1838 onwards, indentured servants from India were brought to British Guiana to work on the plantations. They were contracted to serve for five years, however many discovered that it was difficult to return home. In the mid-19th century, many sugar estates went out of business, leading to unemployment and homelessness. The Pomeroon River had been settled in the Dutch colonial times, however the upstream area was a swampy area which was never cultivated. The Tacoordeen family were the first to settle in Jacklow. In 1860, the Anglican pastor Jacklowe built a shed in the village for missionary purposes.

Mohamed Sarafraz, an indentured labourer, settled in Jacklow and started to construct a mosque in the village. In 1912, it opened measuring 15 feet (4.6 m) by 12 feet (3.7 m) and was constructed using manicole wood. The mosque served a large area, and developed into a tourist destination for visiting muslims. In 2019, the mosque was renovated and recommissioned.

In 2021, Jacklow and surrounding area was affected by severe flooding of the Pomeroon River.

== Overview ==
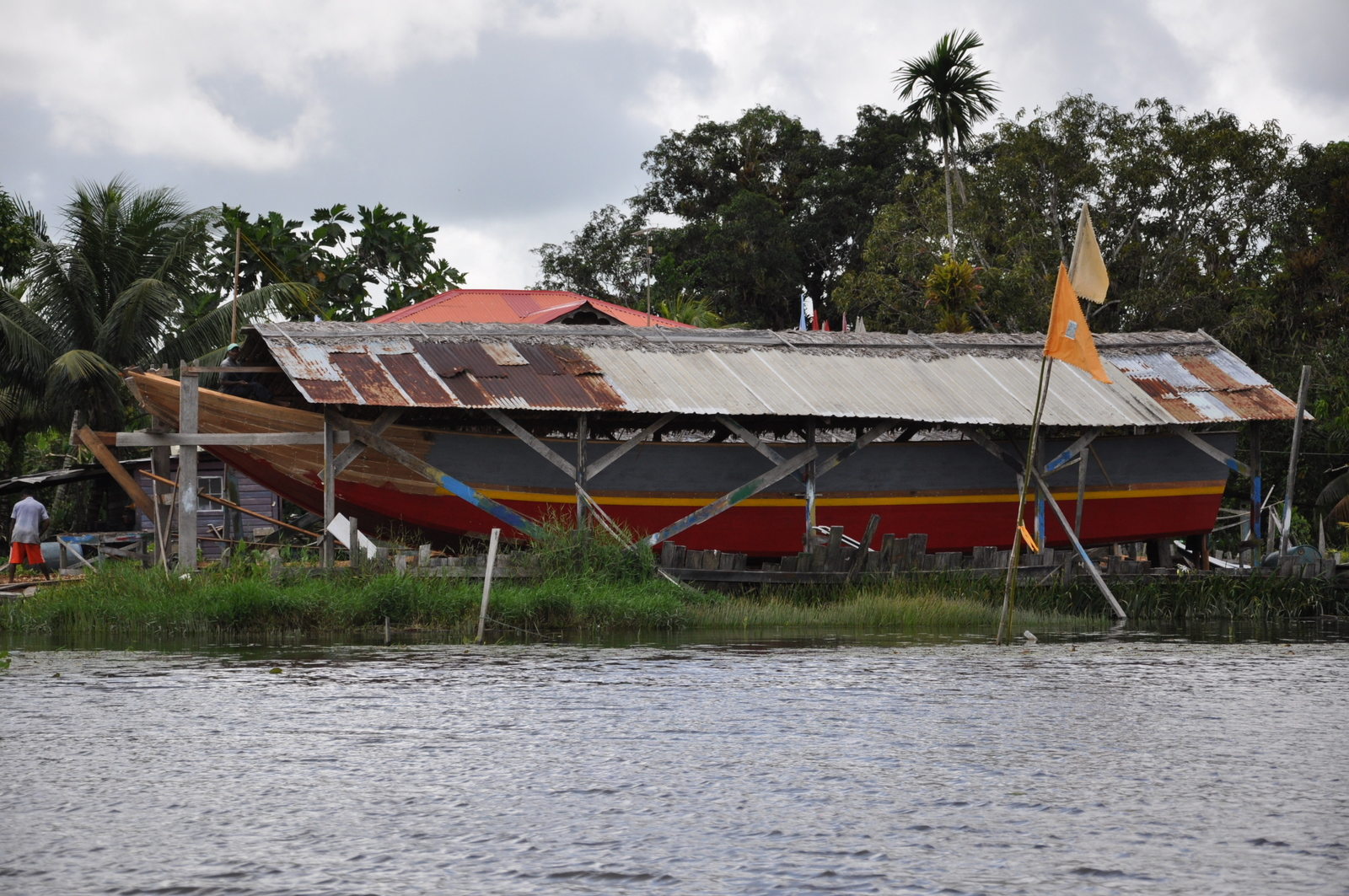
Boat building in Jacklow

The economy of Jacklow is based on farming and boat construction. The village has a primary school, but secondary education and health care is offered in Charity. The village has access to free Wi-Fi. Jacklow has no road connection and can only be reached via the Pomeroon River from Charity.

== Notable people ==
- Isahak Basir (1935–2019), historian and member of parliament.
