= Yvonne Fredericks-Pearson =

Guyanese politician

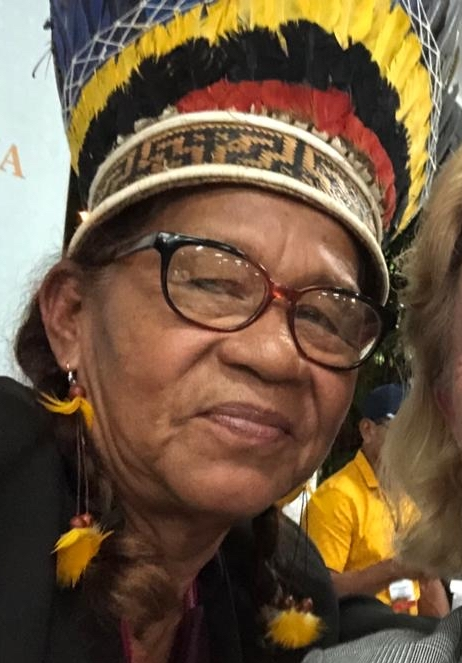
- Pearson in 2022

Member of the National Assembly
- Incumbent
- Assumed office 2015
- Constituency: National list

Chair of the National Toshaos Council
- In office 2009–2012

Toshao of Mainstay/Whyaka
- In office 1994–2012

Personal details
- Born: Yvonne Fredericks; 1955 (age 70–71) Abrams Creek, Pomeroon-Supenaam Region, Guyana
- Party: People's Progressive Party/Civic (since 2010)
- Spouse: Lascel Pearson
- Children: 5

Yvonne Fredericks-Pearson (born 1955) is a Guyanese politician. She has been a member of the National Assembly since 2015. She served as Toshao (village head) of Mainstay/Whyaka from 1994 to 2012.

== Early life ==
Yvonne Fredericks was born to a Kalina family around 1955 in Abrams Creek, located in the Pomeroon-Supenaam region. She was the third of five children. Her father, Fred Fredericks, was a teacher and President of the Guyana Organization of Indigenous People (GOIP). As her family was unable to pay school fees, Fredericks left school at the age of 15, and was sent to work in a shop in Wismar. She wanted to become a mechanic, but could not afford the training course. Instead, she joined a library, and eventually enrolled at an institute for adult education.

In 1978, Fredericks' mother sent for her to rejoin the family for a move to the Essequibo coast. After the move, Fredericks was hired as a driver for Mary Williams, the Regional Vice Chairman. Williams was also the Toshao of Mainstay/Whyaka village (at the time, an unpaid position) some distance inland; on these trips to the village, Fredericks met Lascel Pearson. They soon married, and had five sons. In the 1980s, Lascel was elected Toshao.

== Toshao ==
In 1994, Pearson was elected Toshao of Mainstay/Whyaka. She would ride a bicycle to Anna Regina on a regular basis to take classes at the UG Institute of Distance and Continuing Education. To attract tourists to the village, she lobbied the Ministry of Local Government to open a resort at the village's lake. Pearson's negotiations with the central government and a private company led to the 2002 establishment of an organic pineapple processing facility, which employed over 60 villagers. In 2005, she supported the Mainstay/Whyaka Women's Development Group in starting an aquaculture project. She was elected as Chair of the National Toshaos Council in 2009. Due to new term limits instituted by the 2006 Amerindian Act, Pearson was required to step down as Toshao in 2012.

Pearson joined the People's Progressive Party/Civic (PPP/C) in 2010, and served as an advisor to the Minister of Amerindian Affairs until 2015.

== Member of Parliament ==
Pearson was elected to the National Assembly on the PPP/C National Top-Up list for the 2015 general election. During her first term as an MP, Pearson was a member of the Parliamentary Sectoral Committee on Natural Resources. She also competed in archery (Adult Women 18+ category) at the Indigenous Heritage Games 2019.

Pearson was re-elected in the 2020 general election.
