= List of Guyanese regions by Human Development Index =

This is a list of regions of Guyana by Human Development Index as of 2023.

Rank	Region	HDI (2023)
Very high human development
1	Upper Demerara-Berbice	0.810
High human development
2	Demerara-Mahaica	0.796
3	Mahaica-Berbice	0.778
–	Guyana	0.776
4	East Berbice-Corentyne	0.766
5	Essequibo Islands-West Demerara	0.767
6	Pomeroon-Supenaam	0.738
7	Cuyuni-Mazaruni	0.721
8	Upper Takutu-Upper Essequibo	0.711
Medium human development
9	Barima-Waini	0.697
10	Potaro-Siparuni	0.691
