= Lima Sands =

- Village
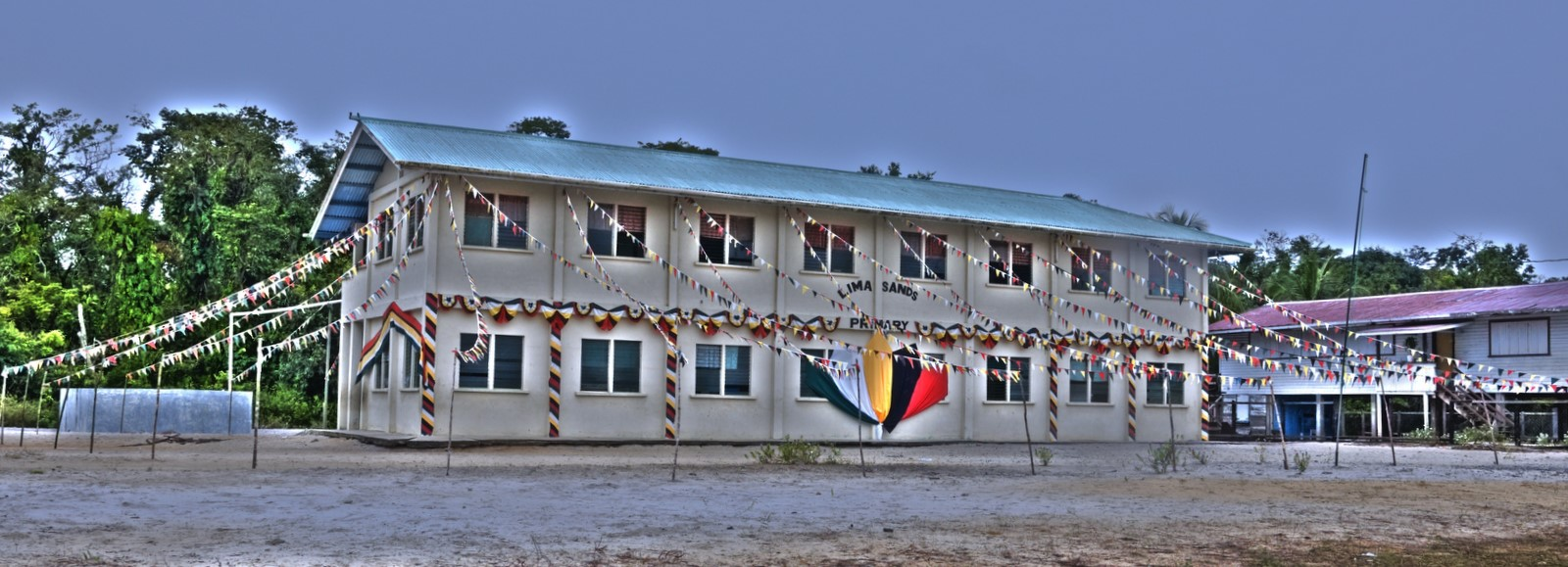
- Lima Sands Primary School

- Location in Guyana
- Coordinates: 7.2679°N 58.5371°W
- Country: Guyana
- Region: Pomeroon-Supenaam

Population (2012)
  - Total: 854

Lima Sands is a village in the Pomeroon-Supenaam Region of Guyana. It is located to the west of Anna Regina. The Cheddi Jagan Bio Diversity Park is in Lima Sands.

== History ==
The plantations in the area were depended on the Anna Regina estate for their water. The relationship between the planters was poor, and the water supply was often sabotaged. In 1788, a canal was dug from Tapakuma Lake to the Lima estate using slave labour which resulted in the creation of Lima Sands. The canal became a favourite escape route for slaves. The Cheddi Jagan Bio Diversity Park opened in the village on 23 March 2002.

== Overview ==
Lima Sands has a primary school, a health care centre and a community centre. The village has electricity, and a water supply. It has eight churches, a mosque, and a mandir. Lima Sands can be accessed from Anna Regina, and Mainstay Lake. In December 2021, it was announced that the road to Anna Regina will be asphalted and upgraded.

Lima Sands was designated in 2020 as a location for 600 new houses. In 2021, it was announced that a 3.6 MW solar farm will be constructed near Lima Sands to provide electricity for the Essequibo Coast.
