= St. Monica Karawab =

- Village
- Location in Guyana
- Coordinates: 7.2001°N 58.9144°W
- Country: Guyana
- Region: Pomeroon-Supenaam

Population (2012)
  - Total: 649

St. Monica Karawab is a village in the Pomeroon-Supenaam region of Guyana. The village is an Amerindian village.

== Location ==
The village is located on the eastern bank of the Upper Pomeroon River, 40 miles from Charity on the Essequibo Coast. It can only be accessed via the Pomeroon River.

== Leadership ==
The village is led by a Toshao and ten councillors; where council meetings are held once a month.

== Overview ==
The two villages of Karawab and St Monica with several smaller satellites are centred on the top of sandy hills next to the riverbank. St Monica Amerindian Village has a population of 629 residents as of 2012, and the main economic activity is logging. Small-scale fishing in rivers and creeks; farming of the rich and fertile sandy hills of the Essequibo is also done and there is a great abundance of native fruits such as awarra, kukrit and curu. The community has a boat and outboard engine to provide transportation for activities in and around the community.

== Development ==
Health There is an ongoing distribution of mosquito nets (Duranets), donated by the Ministry of Health, these nets are available for all families, in the campaign against malaria.
Education The Nursery and Primary Schools have an attendance of 200 students, including from one to four classes which are held to provide for students who prefer to study on the mission. The others are in various dormitories along the coast or Wakapoa.
Agriculture There is a reintroduction of crafts made by local materials from the forest; this craft introduction is to target the foreign markets, to show case the skills of the Amerindian People along with revenue for the village.

General A building, formally owned by the Barama Lumber Company was handed over to the community after the close of operations in the mission. They also provide a new computer for the school along with a solar power supply.

Amerindian Heritage Month is celebrated in all of the various Amerindian Villages across the county every year in the month of September, where outsiders are invited to the Amerindian Villages to celebrate and above the rich local culture.
