= Isahak Basir =

Guyanese historian and politician (c.1935–2019)

Hon. Isahak Basir CCH

Member of Parliament for Essequibo Coast
- In office 1977–1991

Personal details
- Born: 18 September 1935 Jacklow, British Guiana
- Died: 1 February 2019 (aged 83) Hampton Court, Pomeroon-Supenaam, Guyana
- Party: People's Progressive Party
- Spouse: Sabra Karim
- Children: 6
- Education: Bennett College
- Occupation: Historian

Isahak Basir CCH (sometimes Bashir, c. 18 September 1935 – 1 February 2019) was a Guyanese historian who was a member of the National Assembly of Guyana from 1977 to 1991. Basir was nicknamed "Uncle Tabrak" and was of Indian descent.

== Life ==
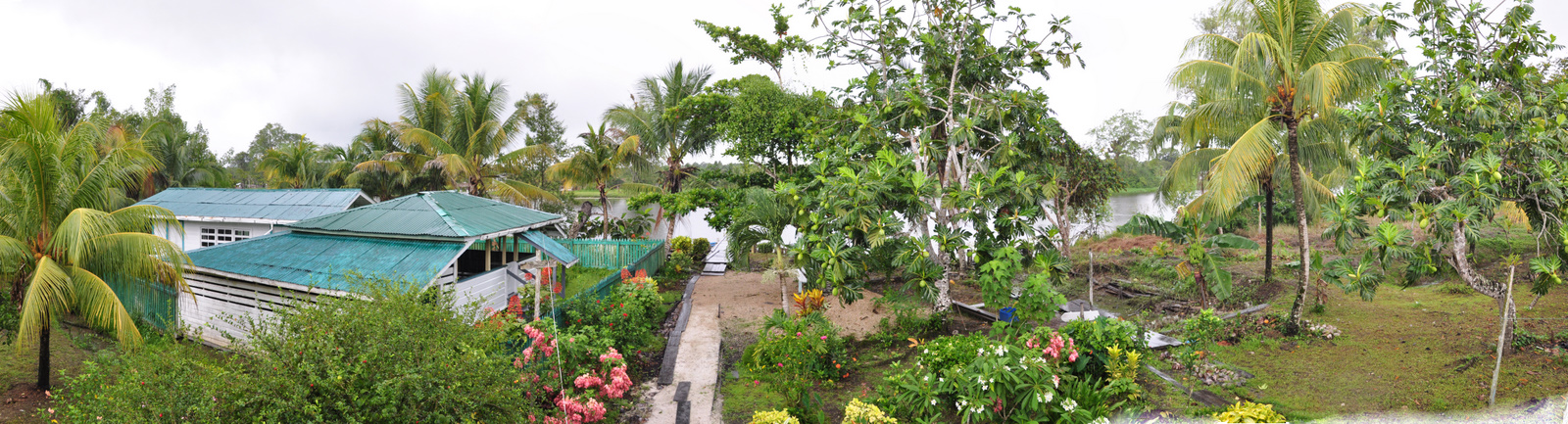
Basir's house of birth

Basir was born in Jacklow, a village near the Pomeroon River in Guyana. He was schooled at the Jacklow Anglican Primary School in his earlier years and later went to a private secondary school in another town. He then returned to Jacklow, where he managed a compound that produced coconut and rice. During this period, Basir studied dentistry overseas at Bennett College. Around 1960, Basir married Sabra Karim, with whom he had six children. After marriage, the couple moved to the Essequibo Coast where Basir worked as an assistant distiller at the Uitvlugt Distillery.

== Political career ==
While at the Uitvlugt Distillery, Basir met Harripersaud Nokta and C. V. Nunes, members of the People's Progressive Party of Guyana (PPP) who encouraged him to join. Basir did and became an activist for the PPP, travelling across Guyana to rally for the party. In 1976, one year after he moved to Hampton Court with Sabra Karim and his children, he was shot five times on a trip that he was invited to by Cheddi Jagan but survived. The shooter, a police officer, remains unknown, and no one has been tried for attempted murder. In January 1977, he was elected to the National Assembly of Guyana as a Minister of Agriculture. He ran again for Minister in 1985, and, during the vote-counting, was told to keep away from the place where the ballot boxes were stored. Similar experiences happened to other PPP candidates, such as Region 5’s Navin Chandarpal, during that election, and today it is suspected that the political party that was then in power, the People's National Congress, was rigging the 1985 election by not allowing anyone to see the vote.

Basir’s political career ended in 1991, when a furious Basir threw a glass of water at Speaker Sase Narain and removed the ceremonial mace from its proper place. This was in protest of Narian's interruption of a motion proposed by Cheddi Jagan to prolong the term of the parliament. This resulted in the first-ever expulsion from the National Assembly of Guyana.

== Final years and death ==
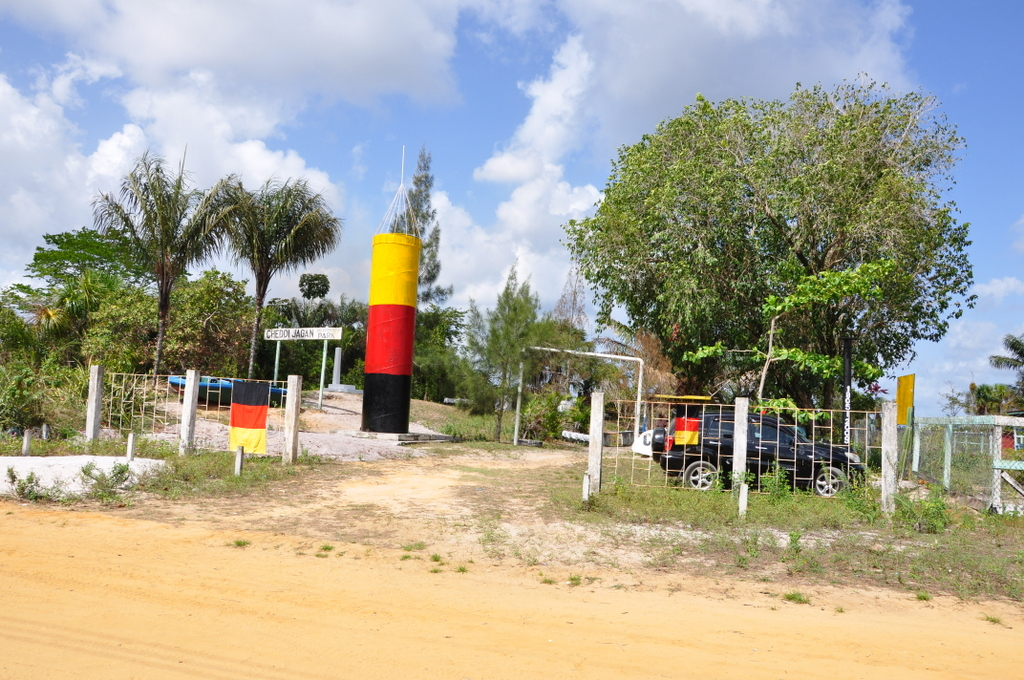
The Cheddi Jagan Bio Diversity Park in 2010.

After his career in politics, Basir worked at the Essequibo Technical Institute as an advisor to the Local Administration and Board of Governors. He also worked as a journalist and as the manager of a 1,500-acre rice land for the Government of Libya.

In 1994, Basir was awarded the Cacique Crown of Honour for his activism.

After Cheddi Jagan's 1997 death, Basir spoke out for Jagan's policies and platforms. In 2001, he urged the PPP to adopt Jagan's theories in a letter. That same year, he established the Cheddi Jagan Bio Diversity Park as a memorial to Jagan.

Basir was a member of the PPP's Central Committee even after his career in politics. In 2002, President and PPP leader Bharrat Jagdeo announced Basir would no longer be a member of the committee. He was denied a pension.

Shortly before his death, Basir was present at a town hall meeting in his region where he informed visitors of the meeting about the use of oil in Guyana.

Basir died on 1 February 2019 of heart failure. His funeral was attended by Donald and Deolatchmee Ramotar, former President and First Lady of Guyana, Moses Nagamootoo, the Prime Minister of Guyana, and Harripersaud Nokta.

After Basir's death, the Indian Action Committee, a Guyanese organization based in the city of Georgetown, announced plans for a statue of Basir to be built in Essequibo. One Guyanese politician, Devanand Ramdatt, suggested that a museum be named after Basir in his honour.
