= John P. Bennett =

Guyanese priest

Canon John Peter Bennett
- Born: 30 November 1914; Grant Faithful, British Guiana
- Died: 25 November 2011 (age 97); Kabakaburi, Guyana
- Citizenship: Guyanese
- Occupations: Priest and linguist
- Notable work: An Arawak-English Dictionary (1989), Kabethechino (1991)
- Spouse: Clara Bennett (nee James)
- Children: Jennifer Bennett, Maurice Bennett
- Awards: Golden Arrow of Achievement (1989)

John Peter Bennett (30 November 1914 – 25 November 2011) was a Guyanese priest and linguist. A Lokono, in 1949, he was the first Amerindian in Guyana to be ordained as an Anglican priest and canon. His linguistic work centred on preserving his native Lokono (Arawak) language and other Amerindian languages; he wrote An Arawak-English Dictionary (1989).

== Early life ==
John Peter Bennett was born to Elsie Bennett and Jacob Bennett at Grant Faithful, near Kabakaburi and the Pomeroon River, in British Guiana on 30 November 1914. He attended school at Kabakaburi until the age of 12. On leaving school, Bennett went to work as a shop assistant in Great Troolie Island and later at a shop on the Pomeroon River.

On 2 December 1938, Bennett married Clara James as St Mattias' Church in Kabakaburi. Their son, Maurice, was born in November 1944, and their daughter, Jennifer, was born in 1956.

== Priesthood ==
Bennett began his training for the priesthood in Kabakaburi, where he studied with Reverend Martin B. Hirst from 1939 to 1944. Hirst, an English native, was an Anglican priest who served in Kabakaburi from 1939 to 1955.

In October 1946, Bennett enrolled at Codrington College in Barbados to study for ordination. Bennett passed his General Ordination Examination (GOE) in 1949, and returned to British Guiana shortly afterwards. He was made a Deacon on 24 June 1949, and was ordained into the priesthood on 18 September of the same year at St George's Cathedral in Georgetown.

After being ordained, Bennett served in the parishes of New Amsterdam (1949–53), Berbice River (1949–53), Rupununi (1950–56), Port Mourant (1953), Bartica (1953–57), Waramuri (1957–67) and Kabakaburi (1967–2011). He was made a canon of the Stall of David in 1976.

== Arawak-English Dictionary and later years ==
You know, if we were checking on the specific sense of an Arawak word we would go and ask one of the old people we knew. But now these old people have died and there is nobody to ask. We have to take their place and try to get to understand as much Arawak as we can. We have become the old people.

— John P. Bennett in Kabethechino (1991), p. 39.

In "An Outline of my life and work" in Kabethechino, Bennett recalls that he "was always interested in [the Arawak] language" although under British colonial rule, schools in British Guiana insisted on students' using English at school and at home, and discouraged the use of indigenous languages. Bennett wrote,

"People were made to feel that speaking their own language was something sinful almost, certainly something bad which should be discouraged. I remember even then, however, feeling that the ability to speak one's own language was something good and shouldn't be lightly discarded."

On 20 June 1965, Richard Hart, a Jamaican historian undertaking research into Arawakan history and culture in the Caribbean, wrote to Bennett to ask for assistance. Concerned that "the Arawak language would be allowed to die out completely before a proper study of it had been made", Hart had contacted the Archbishop of the Anglican Diocese of Guyana to find out whether the church had studied the language. The Archbishop told Hart that he had no knowledge of any such studies, but referred him immediately to Bennett.

Bennett's reply to Hart included an Arawak translation of The Lord's Prayer, and an account of the use of genders and "abstract conceptions" in the Arawak language. Hart responded, saying he was "thrilled" to discover that the priest shared his concern about the language and was "so well qualified to arrest its disappearance." He suggested that Bennett should write a "little book on the language". These early letters marked the beginning of a correspondence that was to last until 1982. Their letters were collected by Janette Forte and published as a book entitled Kabethechino (1991) (Arawak for "close friends").

Bennett began to compile an Arawak-English dictionary in February 1967. In Kabethechino he writes: "In the beginning I wrote down the words that I could remember. Then at odd times a word would come to me – while I was bathing or in bed at night". In 1967 he organized a series of monthly meetings where Arawak speakers would discuss Arawak words and their precise meanings.

In 1971, Bennett underwent two operations in Jamaica to remove a tumor that had been found in his neck. The tumor had been undiagnosed for some time, and the surgery left Bennett partially paralyzed. Despite this loss of mobility, Bennett continued to work on the dictionary, which he completed in 1974. He continued to update it for the next 20 years.

The Dictionary was first published as a double issue of the journal Archaeology and Anthropology in 1989. An updated edition was published by the Walter Roth Museum of Anthropology in 1994. Along with Bennett's other works on the Arawak language, the Arawak-English Dictionary is widely recognized as an invaluable contribution to the preservation of Arawakan. In addition, Bennett has been recognized for his assistance to other scholars in the field.

Bennett died at his home in Kabakaburi in November 2011 at the age of 97.

== Legacy and awards ==
- 1989 Golden Arrow of Achievement
- 2012, the University of Guyana held a program devoted to him: "Asserting the Amerindian Presence: The life and works of JP Bennett". Associated with this conference were exhibits at the Walter Roth Museum of Anthropology and Archaeology; the UG Library; The Division of Creative Arts at UG, and the Amerindian Research Unit.

== Works ==
- 1986. The Arawak Language in Guyanese Culture. Georgetown: Department of Culture
- 1989. "An Arawak-English Dictionary with an English Word List" in Archaeology and Anthropology 6. 1–2.
- 1991. Kabethechino: A Correspondence on Arawak. Coauthored with Richard Hart. Edited by Janette Forte. Georgetown: Demerara Publishers.
- 1995. Twenty-Eight Lessons in Loko (Arawak): A Teaching Guide. Georgetown: Walter Roth Museum.
