= Mainstay =

Mainstay may refer to:

- Mainstay (band), a Christian rock band from Minneapolis, USA
- Mainstay (rope), a cable, line, or rope from the top of the main-mast to the foot of the fore-mast on a sailing vessel, forming part of the vessel's standing rigging
- Beriev A-50, a Russian AWACS aircraft
- USS Mainstay (AM-261), a US Navy minesweeper
- Mainstay Lake in Guyana
