= Hackney, Guyana =

Hackney
- Village
- Location in Guyana
- Coordinates: 7°33′34″N 58°41′28″W
- Country: Guyana
- Region: Pomeroon-Supenaam

Population (2012)
  - Total: 137

Hackney, is a village in Guyana, on the eastern bank of the Pomeroon River, 11 km from its mouth. It provides a primary school and church for residents of the surrounding area.
