= Cheddi Jagan Bio Diversity Park =

Park in Pomeroon-Supenaam, Guyana

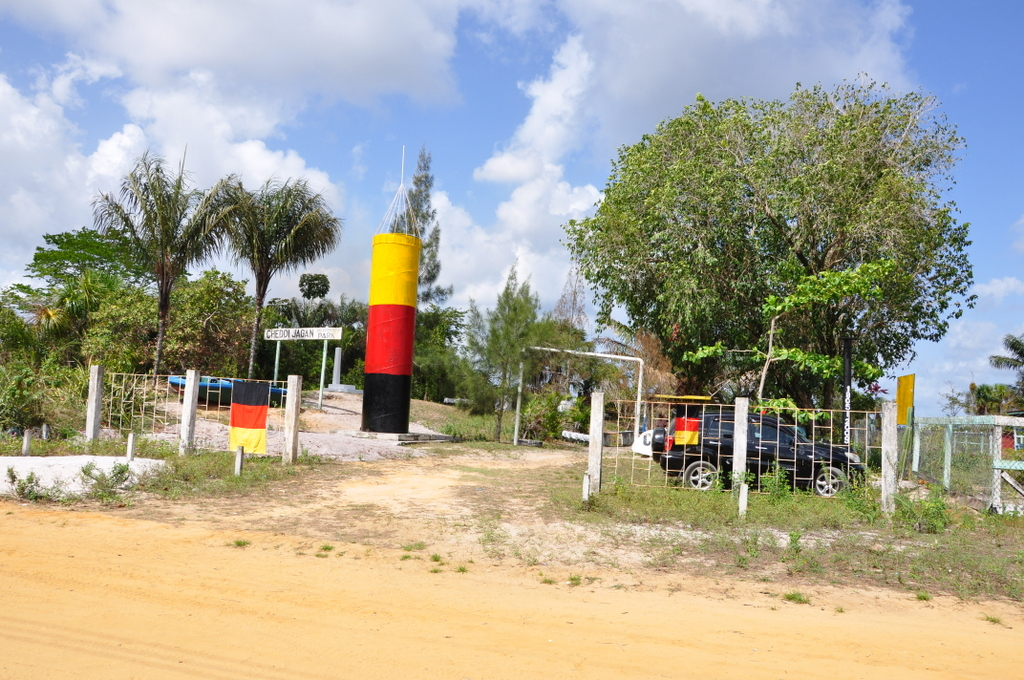
- Location: Lima Sands, Pomeroon-Supenaam, Guyana
- Coordinates: 7.2609°N 58.5460°W
- Created: 2001

Cheddi Jagan Bio Diversity Park is a park in Lima Sands Pomeroon-Supenaam, Guyana. It was opened in 2002 in memory of former president Cheddi Jagan.

Isahak Basir came up with the idea for the park, and its location at Lima Sands village west of Anna Regina, was chosen in September 2001. It officially opened on March 23, 2002 by Minister Clement Rohee.

The park contains a variety of plants and subordinating savannahs, and can be accessed by road parallel to the Tapacooma Main Canals.

Lima Sands Cemetery is also located at the park.

== See also ==
- History of Guyana
- Guyana Botanical Gardens
