= Bethany Village =

Bethany Village Bethany Mission
- Mission
- Location in Guyana
- Coordinates: 6.9964°N 58.6325°W
- Country: Guyana
- Region: Pomeroon-Supenaam

Government
  - Toshao: Sonia Latchman

Population (2012)
  - Total: 526

Bethany Village is a mission located on the Araburia River, a tributary three miles up the Supenaam River in Pomeroon-Supenaam, Essequibo in Guyana.

== Overview ==
Bethany is an Amerindian settlement that started as a Seventh-day Adventist community, and derived its name from the bible. The main access to the coast is via the Supenaam River to the Town of Supenaam, but there is also an airstrip located 1 mile from the centre of the community. Bethany is next to another Amerindian Village, Mashabo.

Settlement began in the 1880s due to the close proximity to the forest for logging, as well as a nearby Dutch sawmill at the time. Logging continues to be important for the village. Small scale farming is done, producing bora, pak choi, eddo, yam, plantain and pumpkin, but capturing of wild life is prohibited.

== Public services ==
Bethany has a primary and nursery school, community centre, recreational park, health centre, an airstrip, a Seventh-Day Adventist Church. It also has a Seventh-Day denominated medical missionary college. Travel to the village is by boat, and Guyana Adventist Medical Aviation Service provides flights for medical emergencies.

Snakes are prevalent in and around the village, and have been known to take off with domesticated animals of Bethany residents.
