= Walter Heard =

The Ven. Walter Heard was Archdeacon of Berbice from 1894 until 1907.

Heard was educated at St Augustine's College, Canterbury and ordained in 1871. After curacies at All Saints, Berbice and St Jude, Berbice heheld incumbencies at Skeldon, Suddie and New Amsterdam.

He retired to Saint Aubin, Jersey.
