= Spring Garden, Guyana =

Spring Garden
- Village
- Location in Guyana
- Coordinates: 6.9848°N 58.5145°W
- Country: Guyana
- Region: Pomeroon-Supenaam

Population (2012)
  - Total: 308

Spring Garden is a village in the Pomeroon-Supenaam region of Guyana.

Spring Garden is located on the Essequibo coast, next to the Good Hope village. The port village Supenaam is two villages away. The population consists of mostly East Indians.
