= Wakapau River =

Physical characteristics
- Mouth: Pomeroon River
  - location: Guyana
  - coordinates: 07°36′00″N 58°45′00″W

The Wakapau River is a tributary of the west bank of the Pomeroon River in Guyana.

The village of Wakapau is found on the Wakapau River, 3 km from its mouth.

River boats are common mode of transportation throughout the area. The Wakapau has been interest for kayaking enthusiasts, both in producing competitive athletes as well as potential for development for tourism.

It was once the location of balatá bleeding.

== See also ==
- List of rivers of Guyana
- Tourism in Guyana
