= Supenaam =

- Village
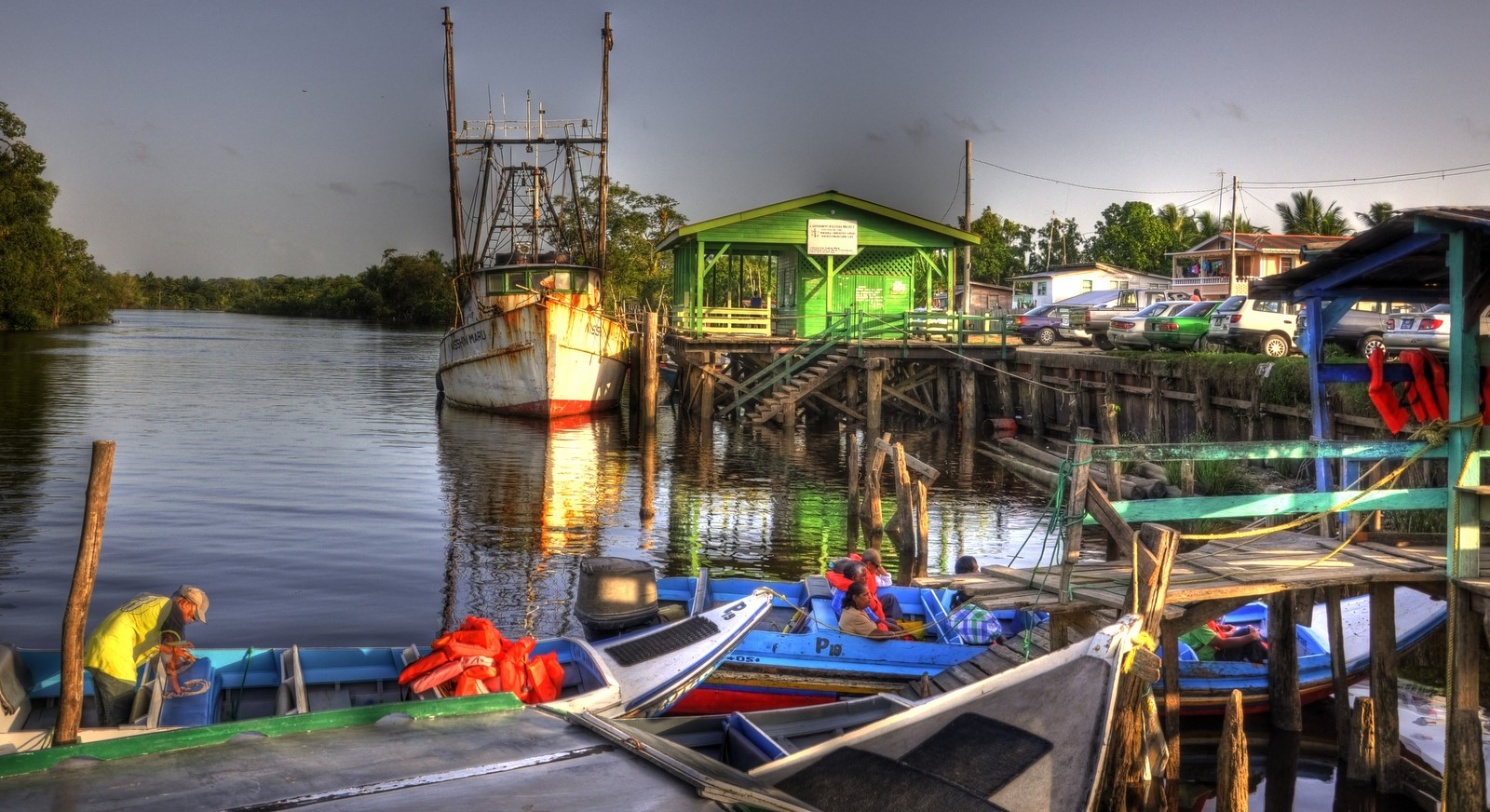
- The harbour of Supenaam

- Location in Guyana
- Coordinates: 6.9751°N 58.5166°W
- Country: Guyana
- Region: Pomeroon-Supenaam

Population (2012)
  - Total: 1,384
- Time zone: UTC-4
- Climate: Af

Supenaam is a port village located in the Pomeroon-Supenaam region of Guyana. Supenaam is home to the ferry across the Essequibo River to Parika. The ferry is the main link between the western half of Guyana and the eastern half.

== Overview ==
Supenaam used to be an agricultural community dominated by sugar estates. During the Dutch colonial era, it served as the access point to Fort Island. The Supenaam River, a tributary of the Essequibo, is mainly used for forestry and home to several sawmills.

In 1978, a speedboat service to Parika was initiated which boosted the economy of the village. The regular ferry used to depart from Adventure. In May 2010, a new stelling (harbour) was opened in Supenaam to serve as the new point of departure for the ferry. Several days later, the ramp collapsed under the weight of the vehicles. The Essequibo Coast Road connects Supenaam with Charity on the Pomeroon River. The road was paved in 1998.

Supenaam has developed into a busy port, however for secondary education and health care, it is still dependent on the neighbouring village Suddie.
