= Wakapau =

- Village
- Location in Guyana
- Coordinates: 07°31′N 58°48′W
- Country: Guyana
- Region: Pomeroon-Supenaam

Population (2012)
  - Total: 1,807

The Lokono village of Wakapau (Wacquepo or Wakapoa) is located in the Pomeroon-Supenaam Region of Guyana, on the Wakapau River, a tributary on the west bank of the Pomeroon River, 3 kilometres (1.9 mi) from its mouth. The name originates from the Lokono word ‘Wakokwãn’, which means pigeon. The village is composed of twenty inhabited islands. Some of the islands only contain a single family.

Wakapau was one of the ten original "Indian reservations" of British Guiana. and is an example of an Amerindian community that still speaks its tribal language and practices traditional Lokono culture. The community consists of island settlements in the swamps surrounded by forests. The economy is based on logging, subsistence farming and boat services.

It has three primary and one secondary school.
