= Long Creek, Guyana =

Long Creek
- Village
- Location in Guyana
- Coordinates: 6.2688°N 58.2431°W
- Country: Guyana
- Region: Demerara-Mahaica

Population (2012)
  - Total: 168
- Time zone: UTC-4
- Climate: Af

Long Creek is a village located 24.5 km up the Soesdyke-Linden Highway in the Demerara-Mahaica region of Guyana. Long Creek is hidden out of sight at the end of a trail off the highway.

There is no electricity in the village except for private Diesel generators. The economy is based on subsistence farming, fishing and coal production.

Long Creek has two churches and one primary school. The Cottage Health Centre is the closest healthcare facility.
