= Rockstone =

- Village
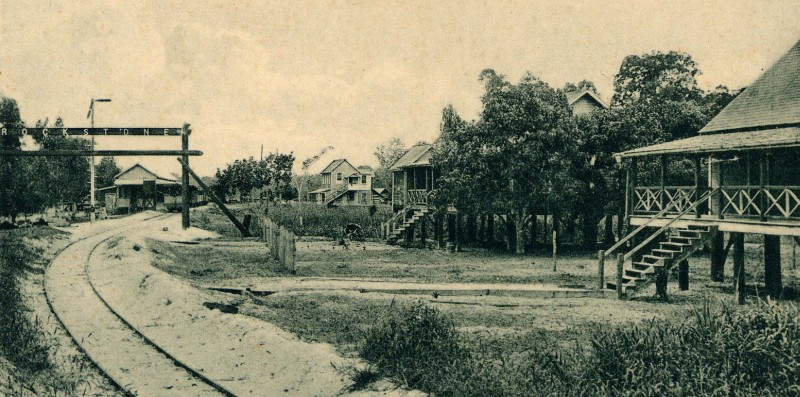
- Railway terminus at Rockstone (ca.1900)

- Location in Guyana
- Coordinates: 05°58′59″N 58°32′59″W
- Country: Guyana
- Region: Upper Demerara-Berbice
- Elevation: 20 ft (6 m)

Population (2012)
  - Total: 218
- Time zone: UTC-4
- Climate: Af

Rockstone is a village on the right bank of the Essequibo River in the Upper Demerara-Berbice Region of Guyana, altitude 6 metres (22 feet). Rockstone is approximately 26 km west of Linden and is linked by road.

The village demographics are mostly Amerindian, but there are also Afro-Guyanese. The population has dwindled as residents seek employment opportunities elsewhere. The town governance is done by a Community Development Council (CDC) and a Community Council that formed in 2012 (also called a village council). The community council seeks to have the village registered and recognized as an Amerindian village, but that has created some conflict as the CDC and village councils have separate aims and property rules.

In 1897, a metre gauge industrial railway was built between Rockstone and Wismar (nowadays called Linden). The Essequibo River was hard to navigate, but the Demerara River was suitable for ocean-going ships. The railway line gave access to the gold fields, balatá and hardwood plantations for the region around Rockstone. In the 1940s the railway was closed.

Various economic initiatives have been made to encourage growth in Rockstone, but with very little success. Farming and fishing are major economic activities. The town hosts the Rockstone fish festival annually since 2006.

== Public Services ==
The village has a primary and a nursery school which, together, accommodate over sixty children. There is also a health center.
