= Ituni =

Village in the interior of Guyana

- village
- Location in Guyana
- Coordinates: 5°32′N 58°15′W
- Country: Guyana
- Region: Upper Demerara-Berbice

Government
  - Chairman: Curt Murphy

Population (2012)
  - Total: 676
- Time zone: UTC-4
- Climate: Af

Ituni is a village in the interior of Guyana, at an altitude of 100 metres (331 feet). The area grew as a result of bauxite mining in the area.

Ituni is closely affiliated with Linden, its closest neighbours are Kwakwani, Aroaima, Maple Town and Laddern's Ville on the Berbice River. It is located between two of Guyana's major rivers, the Berbice and the Demerara. It has a primary school, Howell Wilson Primary School, but students attend secondary school in Kwakwani or Linden.

In 1946, a railway line opened between Ituni and Mackenzie. Even though the line was for mining operations, irregular passenger trains continued until 1982. The railway line has been replaced by trucks, however most of the track is still in place.

In the active times of Demerara Bauxite Company (owned by Alcan), Ituni had consistent water and electricity. Ituni depends solely on logging for its economic livelihood. It has the Ituni Small Loggers Association.

Poor conditions of the Linden/Kwakwani road led to a protest in 2013 by residents of Ituni and other Berbice river communities. The road serves as lifeline for the people of the sub-region and was in a state of disrepair for decades.

In 2019, a well was installed by Guyana Water Incorporated. Before, water was only provided for two hours a day.
