= Capoey =

- Village
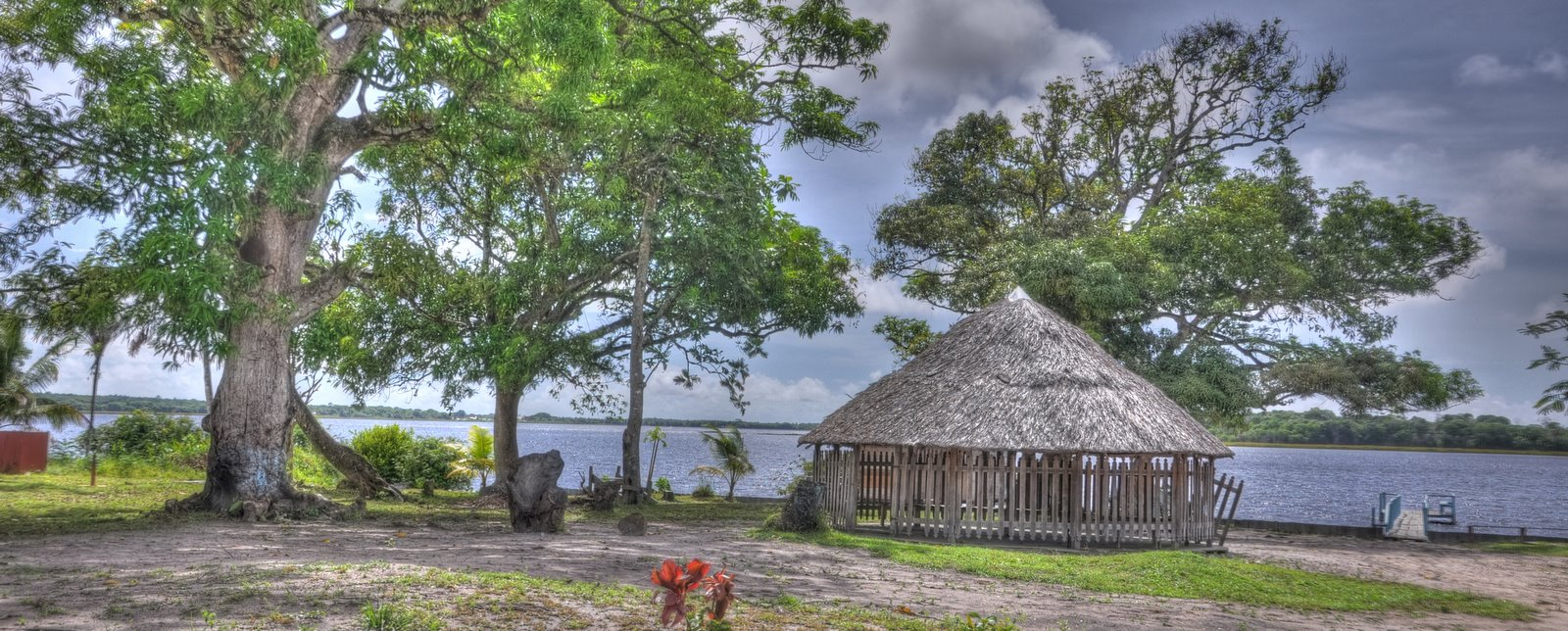

- Location in Guyana
- Coordinates: 7.1932°N 58.5340°W
- Country: Guyana
- Region: Pomeroon-Supenaam

Government
  - Toshao: Ralph Hendricks

Area
  - Total: 9.31 km^{2} (3.59 sq mi)

Population (2012)
  - Total: 523
  - Density: 56.2/km^{2} (145/sq mi)

Capoey is a village in the Pomeroon-Supenaam Region of Guyana. The village is mainly inhabited by Lokono Amerindians. It is located on Lake Capoey, a blackwater lake, which is one of largest lakes of Essequibo.

== History ==
Capoey was originally settled by Wapishana who named the village. The name translates to "Land of the Rising Moon". The tribe was wiped out by a plague. A group of Lokono Amerindians who were enslaved on a plantation on the Essequibo coast escaped from captivity, crossed the lake, and resettled the abandoned village. In the early 20th century, a mission was founded by the Methodist Church.

== Overview ==
The economy of Capoey is based logging, subsistence farming, gold mining, and tourism has become important. The village has a primary school, village office, and a health care clinic. The village provides free transportation to the coast for secondary and trade education. Electricity is provided by solar panels.

== Lake Capoey ==
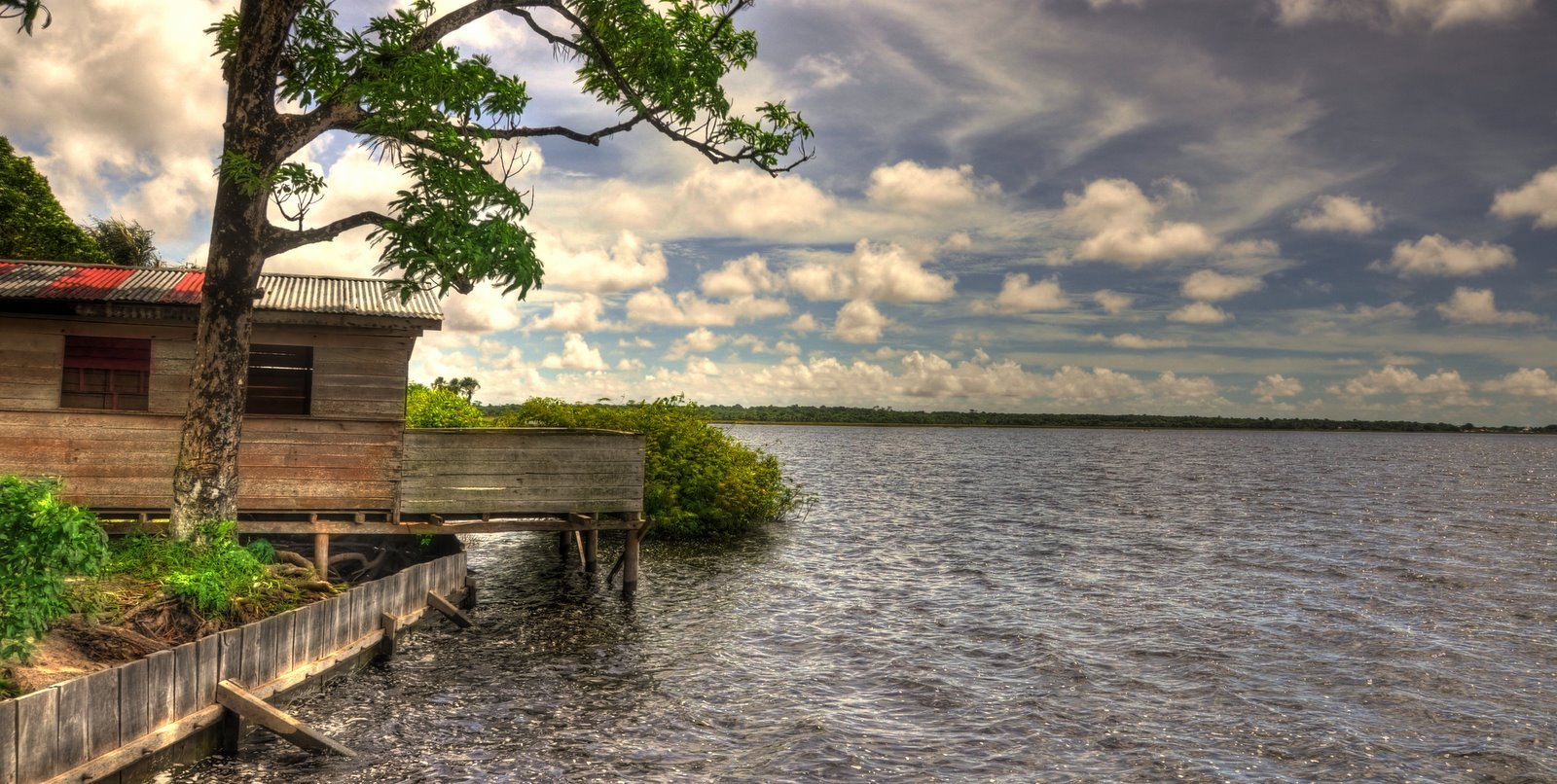

Lake Capoey is one of the largest lakes in Essequibo. The lake is known for its large beige beaches, black water, and benabs (palm thatched hut). The lake is steadily growing in size.

== Transport ==
The lake is accessible via a side road of the Essequibo Coast Road. The village is located on the other side of the lake, and can only be accessed by boat. There is a tiny hamlet on the northern edge of the lake called Mary Point which is part of the Capoey reserve.
