= Kwakwani =

- Village
- Location in Guyana
- Coordinates: 5.2641°N 58.0643°W
- Country: Guyana
- Region: Upper Demerara-Berbice

Population (2012)
  - Total: 2,504
- Time zone: UTC-4
- Climate: Af

Kwakwani is a mining and logging village on the Berbice River in the Upper Demerara-Berbice region of Guyana. Its altitude is 44 metres (147 feet). Kwakwani is approximately 100 km south of Linden. In 1942, the Berbice Bauxite Company opened a bauxite mine in the area which is the main industry of the village. The population as of 2012 is about 2,504 people.

The village has a school and a clinic. It can be access via the unpaved road from Linden to Kwakani via Ituni, and is one of the many gateways to the interior of Guyana. The village is also home to Kwakwani Airport.
