= Adventure, Guyana =

Adventure
- Location in Guyana
- Coordinates: 7°05′N 58°25′W
- Country: Guyana
- Region: Pomeroon-Supenaam

Population (2012)
  - Total: 1,334

Adventure is a village located in the Pomeroon-Supenaam Region of Guyana, on the Atlantic coast, at sea level, one mile south of Onderneeming.

Region 5 and 6 both also have villages called 'Adventure' in the 2012 census.

It is a riverine settlement at the mouth of the Essequibo River, and was linked to Wakenaam and Parika by the terminal of the ferry service. It is connected by road to the West Coast of Demerara, and to the city of Georgetown via the Demerara Harbour Bridge. It had a night spot, bar and hotel for passengers until the closure of the stelling and opening of a new stelling in Supenaam in 2011.

Adventure has a nursery school, a Baptist Church ( Adventure Baptist Church), started by American and Brazilian missionaries, a mosque, a temple and a supermarket. For primary education, students attend schools in neighboring villages such as Onderneeming or Suddie.

The community is referenced in Gerald Durrell's book, Three Singles to Adventure.
