= Kuru Kururu =

Kuru Kururu Newtown Settlement
- Village
- Location in Guyana
- Coordinates: 6.5377°N 58.2209°W
- Country: Guyana
- Region: Demerara-Mahaica

Population (2012)
  - Total: 4,491
- Time zone: UTC-4
- Climate: Af

Kuru Kururu or Newtown Settlement is the first and largest village on the Soesdyke-Linden Highway in Guyana. It is situated approximately 38 kilometres south of Georgetown, Guyana's Capital City.

== Socio-Economic Data ==
Kuru Kururu has a population of 4,491 as of 2012. Census data shows that in relation to the ethnic distribution,43.4% of the population are of Mixed origin, 35.2% are Africans, 10.2% are Amerindians, and 9.9% are East Indians. Portuguese, Chinese and Whites account for 0.2%, 0.1% and 0.1%, respectively, of Kuru Kururu's ethnic landscape.

13.5% of the working population in Kuru Kururu is involved in elementary occupation, 8.6% are in agricultural industry, 8% are involved in Craft and related industries. Some of the approximately 3,080 residents work at saw mills and chicken farms in the surrounding areas. Splashmins' Fun Park, a resort located approximately 3 miles from Kuru Kururu also provides employment for some residents. Ricks and Sari Industries, a bottling and manufacturing company situated at Block A Kuru Kururu provides employment for a significant amount of Kuru Kururu's residents, particularly females.

Social activities in Kuru Kururu include, in the main, attending religious services, weddings, funerals, and week end parties hosted mainly by individuals as a means of income generation.

== Educational Institutions ==
The community has 2 Public schools. One kindergarten or Nursery School and one Primary or Elementary School. Kuru Kururu Primary School has a total of 761 children enrolled as the end of the September to December Term for 2013, and that the average monthly attendance was 88.2%.

There is also a National Library Outlet that exists within the community.

== Religious Affiliation ==
Regarding religious affiliation in the community, the vast majority of the population are of Christian persuasion, with 85.3% following this religion. Hindus and Muslims account for 4.3% and 1%, respectively, of the population. There are other smaller groups of Bahais and Rastafarians within the community's population.

== Organized Groups ==
Kuru Kururu is replete with several organizations. Over 13 Faith Based organizations, a nursery (kindergarten) and primary (elementary) School, a library, health centre, a police outpost, to name a few of the institutions that exist within the community. There are also Sports Clubs, Community Development Councils, a Farmers’ Association, a Women's Empowerment group, and a Literacy Club.
