= Akenie Adams =

Guyanese cricketer (born 1998)

Personal information
- Full name: Akenie Arlington Adams
- Born: 5 February 1998 (age 28)
- Batting: Left-handed
- Bowling: Left-arm orthodox spin

Domestic team information
- Years: Team
- 2017–present: Guyana

Career statistics
Competition	FC
Matches	1
Runs scored	4
Batting average	–
100s/50s	0/0
Top score	4*
Balls bowled	90
Wickets	0
Bowling average	–
5 wickets in innings	–
10 wickets in match	–
Best bowling	–
Catches/stumpings	0/–
- Source: Cricinfo, 5 May 2017

Akenie Adams (born 5 February 1998) is a Guyanese cricketer. He made his first-class debut for Guyana in the 2016–17 Regional Four Day Competition on 21 April 2017.

Adams' brother, Anthony Adams is also a cricketer and both play for the Essequibo, right-handed, bowling left-arm orthodox. Adams grew up in Suddie, playing cricket in his neighborhood along with his 5 siblings (including Anthony). He was encouraged to join a club and so took up with Santos Sports Club. Adams was a part of the under-15 Guyana team, then the under-19.

Adams credits his brother as his inspiration, in an interview saying that his favorite memory of playing alongside his brother was "the 2016 Busta 40-over final where they added 85 for the seventh wicket for South Essequibo against East Bank Essequibo"
