= History of the Jews in Guyana =

Guyanese Jews
Total population
- 40 (2007)

Languages
- English, Hebrew, Yiddish

Religion
- Judaism

Related ethnic groups
- Other Jewish groups (Ashkenazi, Sephardi, etc.)

The location of Guyana in South America

The history of the Jews in Guyana goes as far back as the 1600s. Representation has always been low, and by the 1930s there was neither an organized Jewish community nor a synagogue in the capital city of Georgetown. In the late 19th and early 20th centuries, several Jewish families immigrated to British Guiana from Arab lands to avoid persecution and expand business opportunities.

== History ==
=== Pre 20th Century ===
The earliest records of Jews in Guyana was in the mid-1600s, when Jewish settlers arrived in the Dutch colony of Essequibo. In 1658, the Dutch agreed with David Nassy to establish a colony of Jews on the Pomeroon River, which flourished, becoming a prized possession of the Dutch, until its destruction in 1666 by an incursion by the English from Barbados under Major John Scott. The Jews of Pomeroon (Bowroom) fled, following the destruction of their colony, mostly to Suriname, where they were granted unprecedented religious freedoms.

British Guiana was part of the expanding British Empire, which included much of the Middle East. The expansion of the sugar cane industry in British Guiana allowed the British to encourage workers (initially indentured Portuguese from Madeira, and then East Indians from South India), and the expansion of the economy brought opportunities to Jews from warm lands to emigrate. Most of the Jewish migration during this period came from British controlled portions of the Middle East including what is now modern Iraq, and were erroneously identified as Assyrians and called "Syrians." Prominent among these families were affluent Jews including the Elias family from Palestine who ran several mercantile exchanges until the great fires of the 1960s put them out of business. There were also several other Jewish merchant families erroneously identified as Arabs. Until the 1960s, there were close to a few hundred Jewish merchants who were categorized as "Syrians". Most of the Jews returned to the Middle East after racial resentment and political upheaval culminated with race riots of the 1960s.

=== 20th century ===
Prior to World War II, the leadership of Nazi Germany discussed the possibility of exiling the German Jewish population to British Guiana. Winston Churchill had also raised the possibility of relocating up to 250,000 Jews to British Guiana, but his proposal was rejected by then-Prime Minister Neville Chamberlain. In early 1939, 165 Jewish refugees travelling on the S.S. Koenigstein from Europe were refused disembarkation and entry, and not long after the government prohibition immigration.

After World War II began, the British colonial administration in charge of Guyana agreed to provide shelter for 50 Jewish refugees who escaped Europe through Spain. These refugees emigrated after the war.

=== 21st century ===
Today there are a few Jewish communities in Georgetown.

== Notable people ==
Janet Jagan, an American-born Jewish woman married to a Guyanese national, served as prime minister from March 17, 1997, to December 19, 1997, and as president of Guyana from December 19, 1997, to August 11, 1999. However, Jagan downplayed her faith, telling a journalist in a 2000 interview that "Jewishness wasn't much of a factor in my life." Jagan also added that as of 2000, "There's no Jewish community in Guyana."

== See also ==
- Demographics of Guyana
- List of Caribbean Jews
- History of the Jews
- History of Guyana
