= Annandale, Pomeroon-Supenaam =

Annandale
- Town
- Location in Guyana
- Coordinates: 07°10′01″N 58°28′59″W
- Country: Guyana
- Region: Pomeroon-Supenaam

Population (2012)
  - Total: 1,305

Annandale is a village in the Pomeroon-Supenaam Region of Guyana, located on the Atlantic coast, a few kilometres northerly of the mouth of the Essequibo River. It was formerly a sugar plantation.

Annandale is a coastal village on the shores of the North Atlantic Ocean.
