= Bush Lot =

Locations in Guyana with the same name

There are several communities named Bush Lot in Guyana. This article covers four locations.

== Mahaica-Berbice ==
Bush Lot is a community in the Mahaica-Berbice Region 5 of Guyana, approximately 56 miles from Georgetown, the capital. and mostly Indo-Guyanese. Rice production is the main business. Bush Lot contains a Health Centre, Bush Lot Government Secondary, Bush Lot Primary and Bush Lot Nursery School. The village has a Presbyterian Church, and other faiths are represented in the community. The Bush Lot Sea View Park is a major horse-racing venue. Originally a small rural community, the village experienced a burst of development since 1992. Its location is at 6.37808°N 57.66744°W and the population in the 2012 census was 2395.

The 2012 census also identifies a Bush Lot/Village No. 3 near Blairmont and Rosignol with a population of 1044. Violent protests erupted from east coast Berbice Bush Lot village to Cotton Tree during the 2020 Guyanese general election.

== East Berbice-Corentyne ==
Another village by the same name is in East Berbice-Corentyne at 6.2044°N 57.2632°W. It also has a horse-racing track, the Kennard's Memorial Turf Club.

== Pomeroon-Supenaam ==
There is a Bush Lot in Pomeroon-Supenaam Region 2. The population is mixed between Indian and African residents. Most residents shop in the neighboring towns of Cotton Field, Ana Regina and Affiance. The population in the 2012 census was 725.
