= Anna Regina =

- Town and regional capital
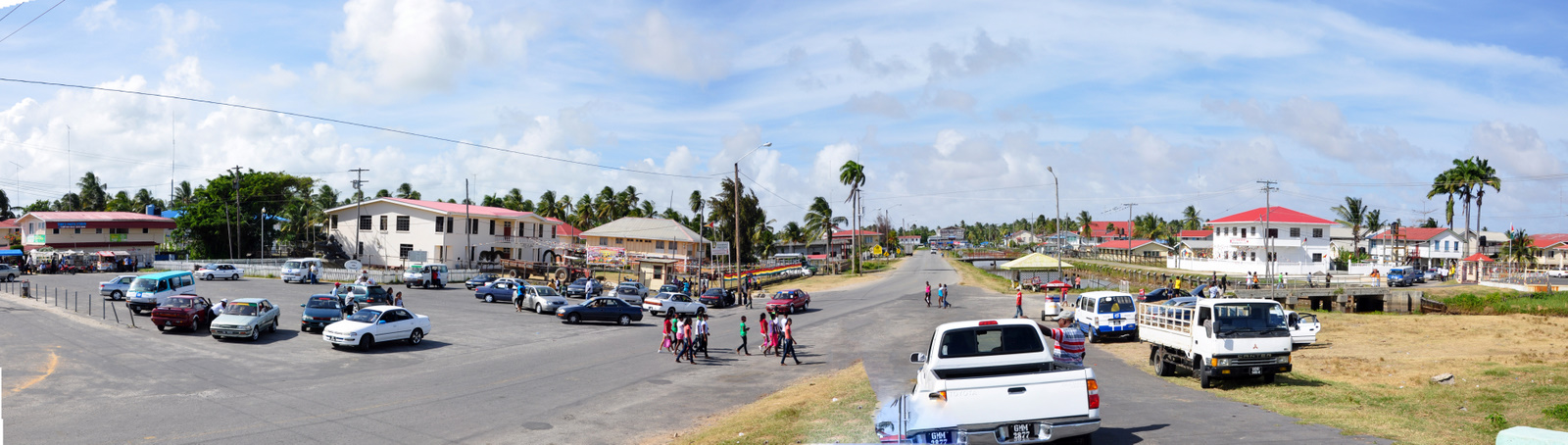

- Location in Guyana
- Coordinates: 7°15′48″N 58°28′50″W
- Country: Guyana; Claimed by Venezuela
- Region: Pomeroon-Supenaam

Population (2022)
  - Total: 11,846

Anna Regina is the capital city of the Pomeroon-Supenaam Region of Guyana, situated on the Atlantic coast, northwest of the mouth of the Essequibo River. Officially established as a town in 1990 under President Desmond Hoyte through the merger of 18 villages, its history traces back to an early 1800s Dutch plantation named in memory of a British planter's two daughters who tragically drowned there. The town has a notable history of labor and civil rights protests, commemorated by landmarks such as the 1972 Devonshire Castle Monument and the 1988 Damon Monument. Historically reliant on sugar production, Anna Regina's economy has since transitioned to rice manufacturing. As of the 2022 census, the town has a population of 11,846 residents, representing 21% of the region's population, and features a uniform, high-rainfall tropical rainforest climate.

== Geography and location ==
Anna Regina is the capital city of the Pomeroon-Supenaam Region of Guyana. The town stands on the Atlantic coast, northwest of the mouth of the Essequibo River, 19 km north of Adventure.

== Demographics ==
According to successive national censuses, the population of Anna Regina has experienced slight fluctuations over recent decades. The 1991 Guyanese census recorded the town's population as 12,197 residents. This figure grew slightly by about 1.6% over the following eleven years, reaching 12,391 in the 2002 Guyanese census. However, by the 2012 Guyanese census, the population experienced a decline of roughly 6.4%, dropping to 11,602 residents. The most recent data from the 2022 Guyanese census indicates a modest recovery, with the population rising to 11,846 residents. This reflects an annual population growth rate of 0.21% between 2012 and 2022. As the capital city of the Pomeroon-Supenaam region, Anna Regina's demographic fluctuations are in line with the fluctuations of the region's population that has grown from 43,455 in 1991 to 56,469 in 2022. Based on the 2022 data, Anna Regina's population represents 21% of Pomeroon-Supenaam's total population and 1.35% of the total population of Guyana.

== History ==
The history of Anna Regina traces back to the early 1800s, shortly after Great Britain took control of Essequibo. At the time, the site operated as a privileged Dutch plantation. According to local history, the plantation was subsequently purchased by a British planter who had two daughters, Anna and Regina, aged eight and thirteen. Sometime between 1810 and 1815, both girls tragically drowned in a plantation canal during an unsupervised morning swim, with one sister perishing while attempting to rescue the other. They were interred near the current site of the Anna Regina Primary School, and the plantation was renamed "Anna Regina" in their memory.

Infrastructure from the plantation era developed with the Anna Regina High Bridge being constructed in 1816 to transport sugar, molasses, and rum via punts from the local sugar factory to the port in Georgetown for export to Europe. While the British initially controlled Essequibo with 34 sugar mills, these structures eventually disappeared and were largely replaced by modern rice factories across the township. Other enduring historical structures in the area include the Anna Regina Police Station, which is more than a century old, and the local Anglican Church, which dates back 150 years.

Anna Regina has a notable history of labor and civil rights protests. On 8 August 1834, an enslaved African named Damon led a strike in Trinity Parish, protesting the introduction of a new system of apprenticeship. Declaring themselves free men, the workers occupied the Trinity churchyard at La Belle Alliance, where Damon raised a flag. Damon was subsequently caught, convicted, and hanged in Georgetown for his role as the leader of the protest. To honor his legacy, the Guyana Commemoration Commission proposed a monument in 1985, which was sculpted in bronze by Ivor Thom. Weighing three tons and standing nine feet tall on a concrete plinth, the Damon Monument was unveiled at Damon Park on 31 July 1988, during the 150th anniversary celebrations of Emancipation. The monument was later refurbished in 2001 by the National Trust of Guyana, which also added an interpretive marker to the site in 2002. In addition to the Damon Monument, the area preserves the 1972 Monument at Devonshire Castle, which commemorates the first East Indian sugar workers killed while protesting for better working conditions.

In 1990, under President Desmond Hoyte, Anna Regina was officially transformed into a town. This transition involved the merging of 18 villages. Today, the town serves as a gateway to three nearby Amerindian settlements: St. Deny's, Whyaka, and Capoey.

== Climate ==
Anna Regina has a tropical rainforest climate (Köppen: Af). The town experiences hot, oppressive, and relatively uniform temperatures year-round, with average daily highs hovering between 83°F (28°C) and 87°F (31°C). Precipitation is significant across all seasons, though the area sees distinct wetter periods, particularly mid-year, contributing to a high annual rainfall.

Climate data for Anna Regina
| Month | Jan | Feb | Mar | Apr | May | Jun | Jul | Aug | Sep | Oct | Nov | Dec | Year |
|---|---|---|---|---|---|---|---|---|---|---|---|---|---|
| Mean daily maximum °C (°F) | 27.9 (82.2) | 28.1 (82.6) | 28.6 (83.5) | 28.9 (84.0) | 28.6 (83.5) | 28.4 (83.1) | 28.8 (83.8) | 29.8 (85.6) | 30.7 (87.3) | 30.5 (86.9) | 29.3 (84.7) | 28.3 (82.9) | 29.0 (84.2) |
| Daily mean °C (°F) | 25.8 (78.4) | 25.9 (78.6) | 26.3 (79.3) | 26.7 (80.1) | 26.6 (79.9) | 26.3 (79.3) | 26.5 (79.7) | 27.2 (81.0) | 28.0 (82.4) | 27.9 (82.2) | 27.1 (80.8) | 26.2 (79.2) | 26.7 (80.1) |
| Mean daily minimum °C (°F) | 24.1 (75.4) | 24.2 (75.6) | 24.5 (76.1) | 24.9 (76.8) | 24.9 (76.8) | 24.6 (76.3) | 24.6 (76.3) | 25.1 (77.2) | 25.7 (78.3) | 25.7 (78.3) | 25.1 (77.2) | 24.5 (76.1) | 24.8 (76.7) |
| Average precipitation mm (inches) | 176.9 (6.96) | 112.7 (4.44) | 103.7 (4.08) | 131.1 (5.16) | 261.6 (10.30) | 315.3 (12.41) | 241.6 (9.51) | 147.3 (5.80) | 79.8 (3.14) | 111.4 (4.39) | 186.6 (7.35) | 223.4 (8.80) | 2,091.4 (82.34) |
Source: Weather.Directory

== See also ==
- Cheddi Jagan Bio Diversity Park
