= USS Mainstay =

Minesweeper of the United States Navy

History

United States
- Name: USS Mainstay
- Builder: American Ship Building Company
- Laid down: 10 April 1943
- Launched: 31 July 1943
- Commissioned: 24 April 1944
- Decommissioned: 6 November 1946
- In service: 28 November 1947
- Out of service: 16 April 1948
- Recommissioned: 1 March 1949
- Decommissioned: 10 January 1950
- Recommissioned: 12 December 1950
- Decommissioned: 21 September 1954
- Reclassified: MSF-261, 7 February 1955
- Stricken: 1 December 1959
- Fate: Sold for scrap, 8 August 1960

General characteristics
- Class & type: Admirable-class minesweeper
- Displacement: 650 long tons (660 t)
- Length: 184 ft 6 in (56.24 m)
- Beam: 33 ft (10 m)
- Draft: 9 ft 9 in (2.97 m)
- Propulsion: 2 × ALCO 539 diesel engines, 1,710 shp (1.3 MW); Farrel-Birmingham single reduction gear; 2 shafts
- Speed: 14.8 knots (27.4 km/h)
- Complement: 104
- Armament: 1 × 3"/50 caliber gun; 2 × twin Bofors 40 mm gun; 1 × Hedgehog anti-submarine mortar; 2 × Depth charge tracks

Service record
- Part of: US Atlantic Fleet (1944-1945); US Pacific Fleet (1945-1946, 1947-1954); Pacific Reserve Fleet (1946-1947, 1954-1959)
- Operations: Operation Dragoon; Korean War
- Awards: 2 Battle stars (World War II); 4 Battle stars (Korean War)

USS Mainstay (AM-261) was an Admirable-class minesweeper built for the U.S. Navy during World War II. She was built to clear minefields in offshore waters, and served the Navy in the Atlantic Ocean and the Pacific Ocean.

== History ==
Mainstay was laid down by American Shipbuilding Co., Lorain, Ohio, 10 April 1943; launched 31 July 1943; sponsored by Mrs. J. A. Hughes; and commissioned 24 April 1944.

After steaming to the U.S. East Coast, Mainstay underwent shakedown in Chesapeake Bay and joined Mine Division 32 on 21 July. Three days later she departed for the Mediterranean, and, as escort for convoy UGS-49, arrived Oran, Algeria, 10 August. On the 15th she sailed for minesweeping operations in support of the Allied invasion of southern France on the coast of Provence. She closed the French coast 20 August, and during the next two months she swept for enemy mines from Marseilles, France, to San Remo, Italy. While sweeping coastal waters between Menton, France, and Ventimiglia, Italy, she came under fire from German shore batteries on 9 and 10 September and engaged the enemy guns with 3-inch gunfire. In addition, she helped repel an attack by submerged, one-man "human torpedoes" on gunfire support ships on the 10th.

Mainstay patrolled the Provence coast until 25 October thence, after overhaul at Bizerte, Tunisia, she swept for enemy mines off Cagliari, Sardinia, and Palermo, Sicily. From 3 to 22 March 1945 she helped to salvage USS Swerve (AM-121), sunk at Anzio by a German mine 9 July 1944. After additional sweeps off Palermo, she sailed 12 April for Oran, joined convoy GUS 84 on the 17th, and arrived Norfolk, Virginia, 5 May.

With the war in Europe ended and Allied victory in the Pacific only weeks away, Mainstay sailed for the Pacific 5 July and reached Pearl Harbor 20 August. Departing 1 September, she steamed via Eniwetok and Saipan to Okinawa; and, after arriving 1 October, she put to sea the 7th to avoid an impending typhoon.

During the next three days she battled heavy seas while typhoon Louise, a most "furious and lethal storm" wreaked havoc at Okinawa with winds of 120 knots She searched off Okinawa for survivors of this vicious storm until 15 October.

Mainstay reached Sasebo, Japan, 20 October, and during the next two months she destroyed numerous mines in waters southwest of Japan, west of the Ryukyus, and north of Formosa. Departing Wakayama 13 January 1946, she steamed via Eniwetok and Pearl Harbor and arrived San Pedro, California, 15 February. She operated out of there and Pearl Harbor until arriving Bremerton, Washington, 16 September. She decommissioned 6 November 1946 and entered the Pacific Reserve Fleet.

Mainstay was placed in service 28 November 1947, Lt. D. H. Dane in charge. Assigned to Service Force, Pacific Fleet, she departed 10 January 1948 for the Far East. Sailing via San Francisco, California, and Pearl Harbor, she reached Yokosuka, Japan, 28 March and was placed out of service 16 April 1948. She recommissioned 1 March 1949. Assigned to Mine Squadron 3, she arrived Sasebo 21 April and, for 7 months, operated off Kyūshū between Sasebo and Rokura. Returning to Yokosuka 23 November, she decommissioned 10 January 1950.

Mainstay recommissioned 12 December 1950. A week later she departed for the eastern coast of Korea, and on 2 January 1951 she began coastal patrols and mine sweeps in support of the Blockading and Escort Force. During the next month she cleared a path for inshore fire support ships. As American and U.N. ground forces began their second drive up the peninsula, she swept for mines and fired at enemy shore positions during an amphibious feint on 30 and 31 January against the Communist-held Kansong-Kosong area. On 2 February she supported rescue operations after USS Partridge (AMS-31) struck a mine off Sokcho and sank.

After returning briefly to Sasebo 4 February, Mainstay resumed sweeping and patrol duty off Korea. She ranged the coastal waters from Pohang in the south to Songjin in the north, and between 21 February and 31 May she operated primarily off Wonsan supporting the siege and bombardment of the harbor. She departed Korean waters 7 August, touched at Sasebo and Yokosuka, and steamed for the U.S. West Coast 20 August, arriving Long Beach, California, 11 September 1951.

For almost two years Mainstay operated along the California coast and in Hawaiian waters. She again deployed to the Far East 6 August 1953 and resumed patrols off South Korea 22 September. Operating out of Sasebo, she cruised coastal waters from Pusan to Pohang during the remainder of 1953. She completed her final patrol 10 February 1954 and two days later departed Sasebo for Long Beach, where she arrived 11 March.

Mainstay remained at Long Beach and decommissioned there 21 September 1954. She entered the Pacific Reserve Fleet at San Diego, California, and while berthed there was reclassified MSF-261 on 7 February 1955. Her name was struck from the Navy list 1 December 1959 and she was sold for scrap to National Metal & Steel Corp. 8 August 1960.

== Awards and honors ==
Mainstay received two battle stars for World War II service and four battle stars for Korean service.
