= William Henry Brett (missionary) =

English missionary in British Guiana

- Born: 21 December 1818; Dover, United Kingdom
- Died: 10 February 1886 (aged 67); Paignton, United Kingdom
- Occupation: Missionary

William Henry Brett (21 December 1818 – 10 February 1886) was an English missionary in British Guiana.

Born in Dover, he was raised by his grandfather after the death of his father. At the age of thirteen or fourteen, Brett became a Sunday school teacher. He was recommended to the Society for the Propagation of the Gospel by the Reverend Thomas Medland, the curate of his church. In 1840, he left England for British Guiana and was ordained a deacon in 1843 by Bishop William Austin. In 1845, Brett founded the village of Kabakaburi on the location where Fort Durban used to be. After suffering from malaria, he was forced to return to England in 1849 but returned late the following year. In total, Brett spent almost forty years as a missionary to the native peoples of South America, retiring in 1879. He translated the New Testament and the Book of Common Prayer into several of their languages.

William Henry Brett married Caroline Nowers in 1845.

Brett died 2 October 1886 in Paignton at the age of 67.

In 1880, Brett published Legends and Myths of the Aboriginal Indians of British Guiana and, in 1881, Mission work among the Indian tribes in the forests of Guiana. In 1851, he published Indian missions in Guiana.
