= Kabakaburi =

Village in the Pomeroon-Supenaam Region of Guyana

Kabakaburi Village
- Amerindian Village
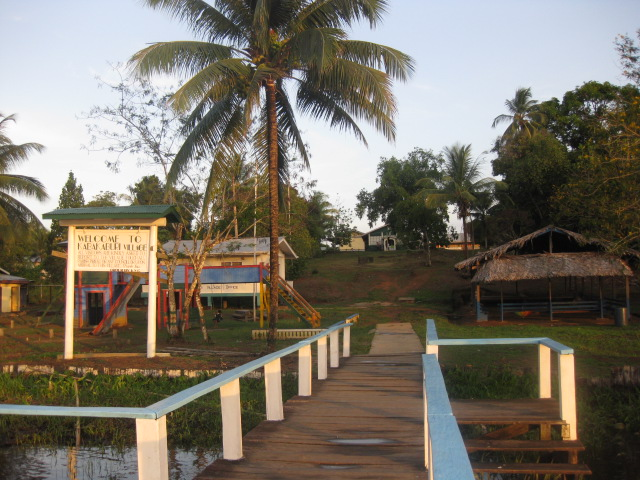
- Entrance to Kabakaburi Village from the Pomeroon River

- Location in Guyana
- Coordinates: 7°14′45″N 58°43′48″W
- Country: Guyana
- Region: Pomeroon-Supenaam
- Kabakaburi: 1845
- Founder: William Henry Brett

Government
  - Toshao: Monty Simon (2021)

Population (2012)
  - Total: 464
- Time zone: UTC-4

Kabakaburi is an Amerindian village in the Pomeroon-Supenaam Region of Guyana on the Pomeroon River, 56 km (35 mi) from its mouth. The village was founded in 1845 by William Henry Brett on the location where Fort Durban used to be.

The name of the village is Arawak for "the place with the itching bush", in reference to the irritant wild arum (Dieffenbachia paludicola). The Arawak named this plant "jotoro", and named the location it grew "kabo kabura," which morphed into the present name.

The village has four subdivisions; Macaseema, Waiwaro, the Mission (Kabakaburi), and Aripiaco.

== History ==
According to Brett's travelogue, Kabakaburi (Cabacaburi) was a hill owned by the Arawak and established as a settlement for wood-cutting. It was abandoned in 1843 until purchased by the first bishop of Guiana for use as a mission, and the village was settled by Kalina people in addition to Arawak. In 1858, the chapel Brett founded at the confluence of the Pomeroon and the Arapaiaco Rivers has deteriorated so much that it was moved to high ground at Kabakaburi.

== Economy ==
The villagers are mostly Arawak and Carib. Many of them work in the area's logging and mining industries. As many as 60% of the residents rely on the logging industry and agriculture is challenged by regular flooding of the Pomeroon River.

The Kabakaburi Handicraft Association was founded in 1994 for community members, including training and a location for production, storage, and selling of handicraft items.

== Services ==
Kabakaburi has a primary school, health centre, and sports hall. A new library, located in the Kabakaburi Primary School, was created in 2020.

The village mainly relies on gas-run generators for electricity and a 65 kW lighting system that was installed in 2012.
