= Onderneeming =

- Village
- Location in Guyana
- Coordinates: 7.10058°N 58.48147°W
- Country: Guyana
- Region: Pomeroon-Supenaam

Population (2012)
  - Total: 1,095

Onderneeming is a village in the Pomeroon-Supenaam region of Guyana. The village is located on the Atlantic coast. Its population was 1,095 in 2012.

== History ==
Onderneeming started as a plantation. After the abolitionism of slavery in 1833, Indian indentured workers were brought to Guyana. The old Dutch fortress at Onderneeming housed the Indian Immigration Office.

Until the start of the 21st century, Onderneeming was a little village with a population of 150 people. In 2009, the Little Red Village program was started in Onderneeming by the non-governmental organization Food for the Poor. Houses were built for people living in squatted shanty towns, and every house was allocated a little piece of land. As part of the program, a school was built.

In 2013, the New Opportunity Corps started in Onderneeming. The program aims to give girls and boys who had been in trouble with the law a new chance. In 2014, the Rooster Resort and Fun Park opened in the village. In January 2021, a health care centre opened. In February 2021, it was announced that 800 new houses will be constructed in Charity and Onderneeming.

== See also ==
- Squatting in Guyana
