= Mainstay Lake =

Lake in Guyana

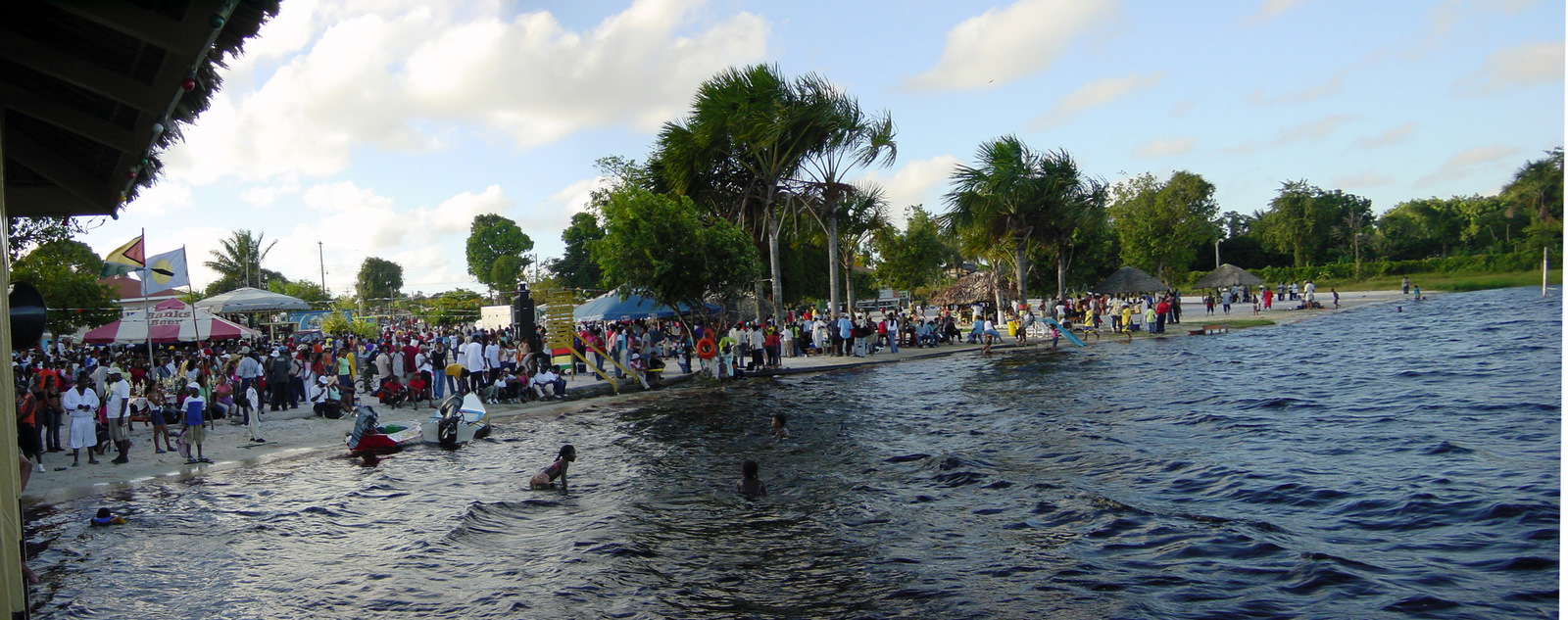

- Location within Guyana Location within South America
- Location: South America
- Coordinates: 07°13′59″N 58°32′19″W
- Basin countries: Guyana
- Max. length: 193 mi (311 km)
- Max. width: 53 mi (85 km)
- Surface area: 7,540 sq mi (19,500 km^{2})
- Average depth: 283 ft (86 m)

Mainstay Lake is a lake in the Pomeroon-Supenaam Region of Guyana, near the Atlantic coast, northwest of the mouth of the Essequibo River, 12 mi (19 km) north of Adventure.

== Economic activity ==
The Mainstay Lake Resort hosts an annual regatta as well as a regular Easter Car and Bike Show. The resort was closed for seven months in 2020 due to the COVID-19 pandemic.

A pineapple processing facility was established in Mainstay/Whyaka in 2002, an initiative of the National Agricultural Research Institute (NARI) and Amazon Caribbean Ltd (AMCAR). Due to declining pineapple farming in the area, AMCAR closed the facility in 2014; there were talks of reopening in 2019.

== Settlement ==
Near the lake is Whyaka or Whyak, an Amerindian community of mostly Lokono people; its name was ‘Quacabuka’, meaning "in-between". The village has a population of 576 and features a primary school (once known as St. Vincent Anglican School) and a nursery school, a health centre, a community centre, a ballfield, a chicken farm, a pine factory, a heritage park. Secondary schooling is done in Anna Regina or Cotton Field. The toshao is Milton Fredericks. The location of the Mainstay Village is 07°14′09″N 58°32′25″W.
