= Upper Demerara-Berbice =

Region of Guyana

Coordinates: 5.269126°N 58.267074°W

Upper Demerara-Berbice Region 10
- Administrative Region
- Flag

- Map of Guyana showing Upper Demerara-Berbice region
- Country: Guyana
- Regional Capital: Linden

Area
  - Total: 17,040 km^{2} (6,580 sq mi)

Population (2022 census)
  - Total: 45,499
  - Density: 2.670/km^{2} (6.916/sq mi)

Upper Demerara-Berbice (Region 10) is an administrative region of Guyana. It is spread over an area of 17,040 km^{2} (6,580 sq mi). As per the 2022 census, it had a population of 45,499 inhabitants. Located in the central eastern part of the country, it is known as the gateway to the interior of the Guyana. The region is known for its significant bauxite deposits and its associated mining industry.

== Geography ==
Upper Demerara-Berbice (Region 10) is one of the ten administrative regions of Guyana. It is located on the central eastern part of the country, and is the only region of Guyana that does not share an international border or coast. It is spread over an area of 17,040 km^{2} (6,580 sq mi), and is known as the gateway to the interior of the Guyana. It is bound by the regions of Essequibo Islands-West Demerara, Demerara-Mahaica, Mahaica-Berbice, East Berbice-Corentyne, Potaro-Siparuni and Cuyuni-Mazaruni. Its administrative center and capital is at Linden. Its topography consists of largely clay and hilly sand regions. The region consists of several lakes formed by the rivers Essequibo, Demerara, and Berbice, which flow through the region.

The region consists of the following settlements and villages:Christianburg, Cockatara, Hururu, Ituni, Kumaka, Kurupukari, Kwakwani, Linden, Mackenzie, Noitgedacht, Rockstone, Tacama, Watooka, and Wismar.

Located at an elevation of 46.39 m (152.2 ft) above sea level, the district has a tropical rainforest climate (Köppen climate classification: Af). The average annual temperature is 28.08 °C (82.54 °F). The district receives an average annual rainfall of 9.9 cm (3.9 in) and has 219.1 average rainy days in a year.

== Economy ==
Upper Demerara-Berbice has significant deposits of bauxite. The bauxite deposits are found in the White Sands, and are amongst the Guyana's largest. The people of the region are mainly employed by mining companies, Bermine and Linmine. The mined bauxite is exported for aluminum extraction. Other economic activities include livestock rearing, timber logging, and agriculture.

== Demographics ==
As per the official census in 1980, Upper Demerara-Berbice had a population of 38,641 inhabitants. It increased to 39,608 and 41,112 in the 1991 and 2002 census respectively. As per the 2022 census, it had a population of 45,499 inhabitants.
