= Suddie =

- Village
- Location in Guyana
- Coordinates: 7°7′0″N 58°28′58.8″W
- Country: Guyana
- Region: Pomeroon-Supenaam

Population (2012)
  - Total: 678

Suddie is a village on the Essequibo coast, situated in the Pomeroon-Supenaam region of Guyana, which is located on the Atlantic Ocean, and one mile north of Onderneeming.

== History ==
Suddie's story reflects its transformation from a social hub for Dutch plantation owners to a vital center for healthcare and community services. In the mid-19th century, a sprawling complex in Suddie served as a clubhouse for estate owners. Here, they would relax on verandas and admire the beachfront scenery. This complex eventually became the present-day Suddie Hospital.

Unlike other coastal estates focused on cotton and sugar, Suddie was known for producing coffee and cocoa. In 1835, Portuguese immigrants from Madeira arrived to work on these coffee and cocoa estates, as well as in honey production. However, harsh working conditions led to a decline in their population. Recognizing their plight, Governor Henry Lyte established a committee in 1841 to investigate the situation. This resulted in improved living conditions and the immigrants' successful integration into Suddie's society. Over time, the Portuguese community flourished and significantly contributed to the village's development.

== Landmarks and Features ==
Suddie boasts several landmarks. A venerable mango tree, rumored to be over 100 years old, provides a sense of history.The Suddie Hospital, a small facility with approximately 100 beds, serves the community. Additionally, the village features a market, A High Court opened in 2005., St. Anne's Anglican Church, schools, a police station, a post office, and a cricket ground.

Anthony and Akenie Adams, cricketers, hail from Suddie.
