= Charity, Guyana =

Charity
- Village
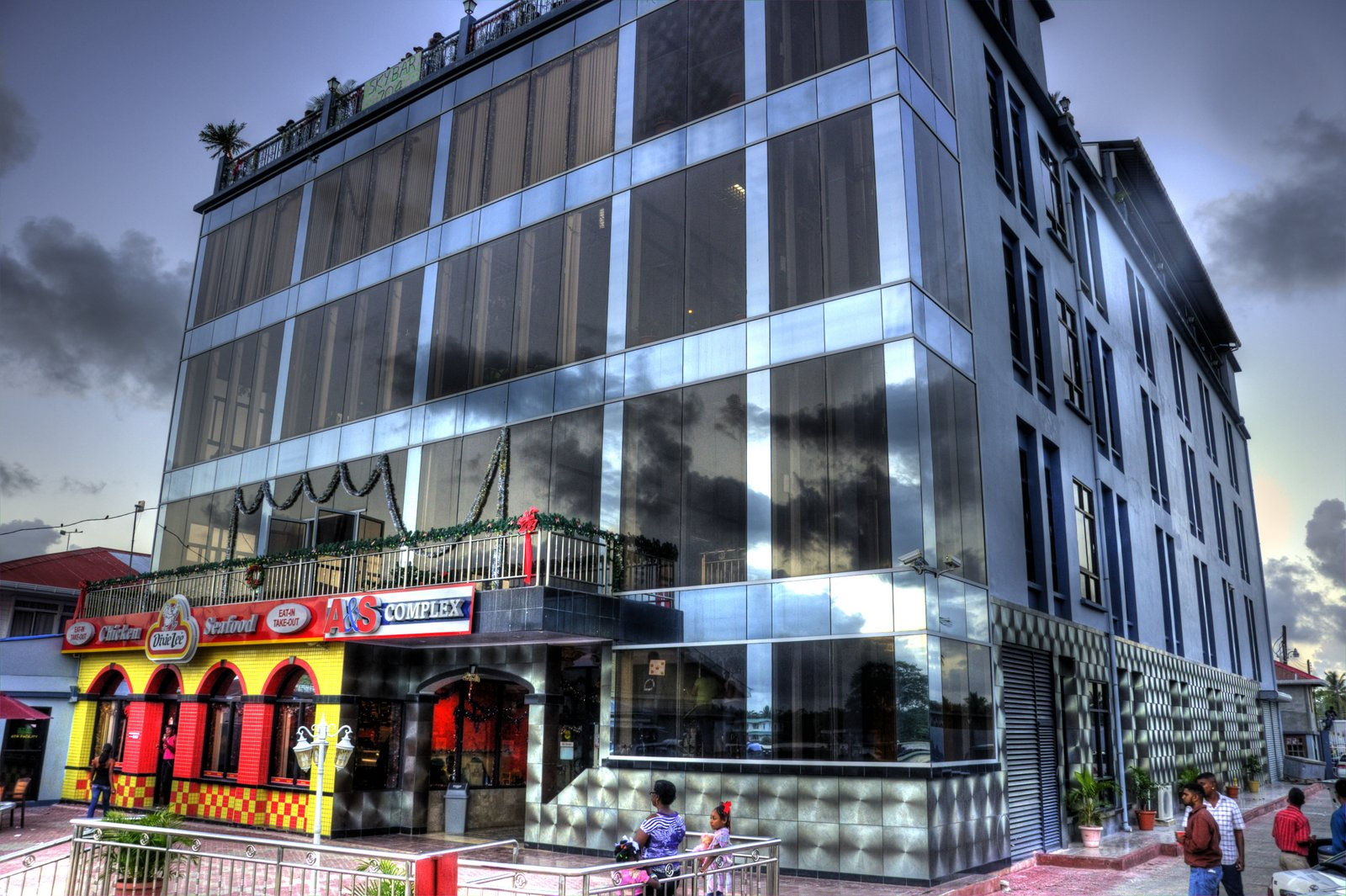
- Alfro Complex in Charity

- Location in Guayana
- Coordinates: 7°24′N 58°36′W
- Country: Guyana
- Region No.2: Pomeroon-Supenaam

Population (2012)
  - Total: 1,485

Charity is a small township in Guyana, located in the Pomeroon-Supenaam Region No.2, which is part of the Essequibo County.

The government of Charity is managed by the Charity/Urasara Neighbourhood Democratic Council. Charity has a recently constructed Magistrate’s Court. St Francis Xavier Roman Catholic Church is in Charity,

Alfro Alphonso, a businessman in the area, established Charity’s only five-story structure, a landmark in the area.

The fish port at Charity buys from fishermen and sells to the domestic and international markets.

== History ==
In 1640, the area was settled by the Dutch as part of Pomeroon. The cotton plantation Vryden Hope was located at present day Charity. The plantation was later abandoned and in 1840 resettled by Portuguese as a coffee plantation. In 1908, the government of British Guiana bought the lands and started constructing a road along the coast. In 1928, a medical centre opened which was converted to a hospital in 1935.

== Charity Market ==
Charity has a market each Monday, and hosts more than 300 vendors. Most of the produce sold at the market comes from the surrounding Essequibo Coast and Pomeroon areas, and merchants from Georgetown sell wares as well.

In 2012, tarmacs were installed to improve the market, but merchants have been slow to move due to perceptions of street-side locations being more competitive. This has led to issues of parking and other strains on the limited infrastructure.

As an active business hub, the area is also inundated with visitors, so the town struggles with waste disposal. Garbage accumulation blocks the drainage system during rains and has led to flooding.

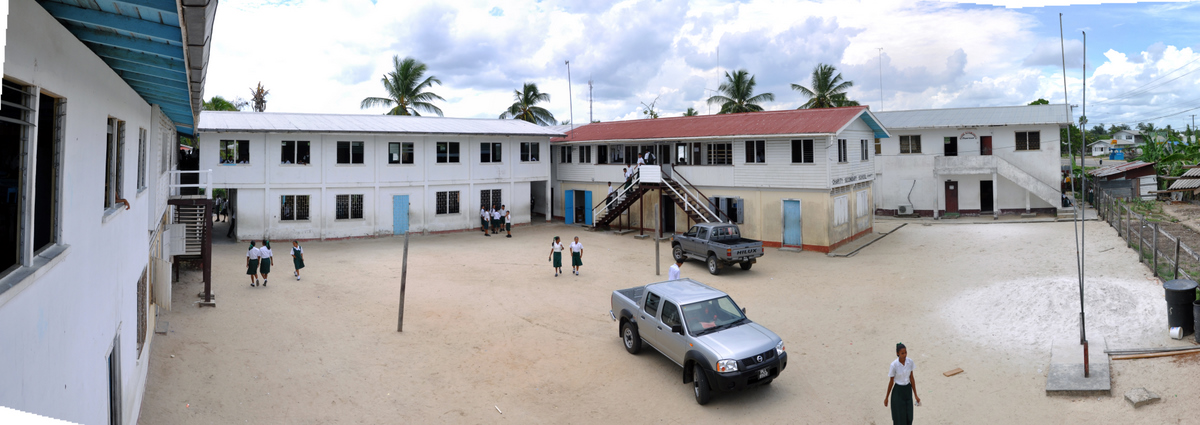
Charity Secondary School

== Location ==
Charity is located on the Pomeroon River which provides a gateway to this part of Guyana's interior and Venezuela. Many Guyanese use this waterway to travel back and forth between Guyana and Venezuela where they work. It is a central focus for the farmers who live in this area. They bring their products to this location and from here it is transshipped to other townships such as Anna Regina and Parika, and to the capital city of Georgetown.
