= Pomeroon-Supenaam =

Region of Guyana

Coordinates: 7°12′N 58°48′W

Pomeroon-Supenaam Region 2
- Administrative Region
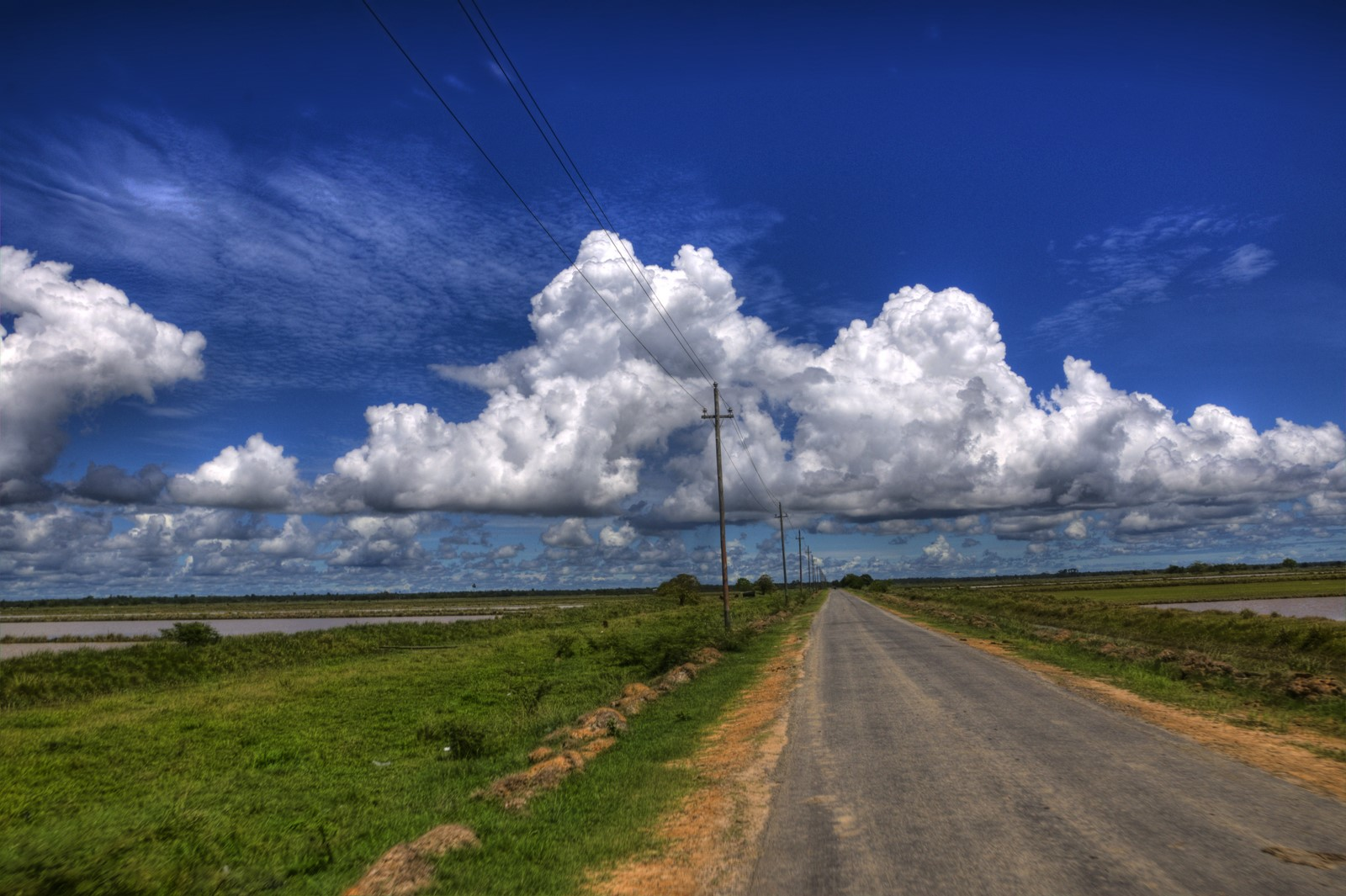

- Flag

- Map of Guyana showing Pomeroon-Supenaam region
- Country: Guyana
- Regional Capital: Anna Regina

Area
  - Total: 6,195 km^{2} (2,392 sq mi)

Population (2022 census)
  - Total: 56,469
  - Density: 9.115/km^{2} (23.61/sq mi)
- Time zone: UTC-4

Pomeroon-Supenaam (Region 2) is a region of Guyana. Its capital is Anna Regina. Located between the Pomeroon and Supenaam Rivers, it is spread over an area of 6,195 km^{2} (2,392 sq mi), and is the third smallest region by area in Guyana. As per the 2022 census, it had a population of 56,469 inhabitants. The major economic activities include livestock rearing, agriculture, and logging.

== Geography ==
Pomeroon-Supenaam (Region 2) is one of the ten administrative regions of Guyana. It is spread over an area of 6,195 km^{2} (2,392 sq mi). The region was established during the 1980 administrative reform of Guyana. It extends from the northwest of the Pomeroon River to the southwest of the Supenaam River. Its capital is Anna Regina, situated on the west bank of the Essequibo River, and hosts several plantations.

The topography consists of mostly forests with patches of low lying coastal plains and clay and sandy hills. The region has about 0.53 million hectares of forested area, covering almost 90% of its land area. There are three large lakes–Capoey, Reliance, and Tapakuma, which have been connected to pool the water for irrigation purposes.

The district has a tropical rainforest climate (Köppen climate classification: Af). Anna Regina has an average annual temperature is 29.78 °C (85.60 °F), and receives an average annual rainfall of 12.28 cm (4.83 in) annually.

== Demographics and economy ==
As per the official census in 1980, the region had a population of 42,341 inhabitants. It increased to 43,455 and 49,253 in the 1991 and 2002 census respectively. As per the 2022 census, it had a population of 56,469 inhabitants.

The major economic activities include livestock rearing and agriculture, with timber logging being a minor contributor. Major agricultural produce is rice, and the region is known as "The Rice Land".

== Communities ==
List of communities/settlements:

- Aberdeen
- Abrams Zuil
- Adventure
- Affiance
- Akawini Mission
- Amazon
- Andrews
- Anna Regina
- Annandale
- Aurora
- Bethany
- Better Hope
- Better Success
- Bounty Hall
- Bush Lot
- Capoey
- Charity
- Columbia
- Cullen
- Danielstown
- Dartmouth
- Devonshire Castle
- Dryshore
- Fair Field
- Fear Not
- Golden Fleece (Golden Fleece Plantation)
- Hackney
- Hampton Court
- Henrietta
- Hibernia
- Huis'T Dieren
- Jacklow
- Johanna Cecilia
- Kabakaburi
- La Belle Alliance
- Land of Plenty
- Lima Sands
- Mainstay/Whyaka
- Maria's Lodge
- Middlesex
- Onderneeming
- Perseverance
- Perth
- Pomona
- Queenstown
- Reliance
- Richmond
- Saint Nicholas (Saint Nicholas Mission)
- Sirikie
- Somerset and Berks
- Sparta
- Spring Garden
- St. Monica Karawab
- Suddie
- Supenaam
- Taymouth Manor
- Three Friends
- Wakapau Village
- Walton Hall
- Windsor Castle
- Zorg

== Gallery ==
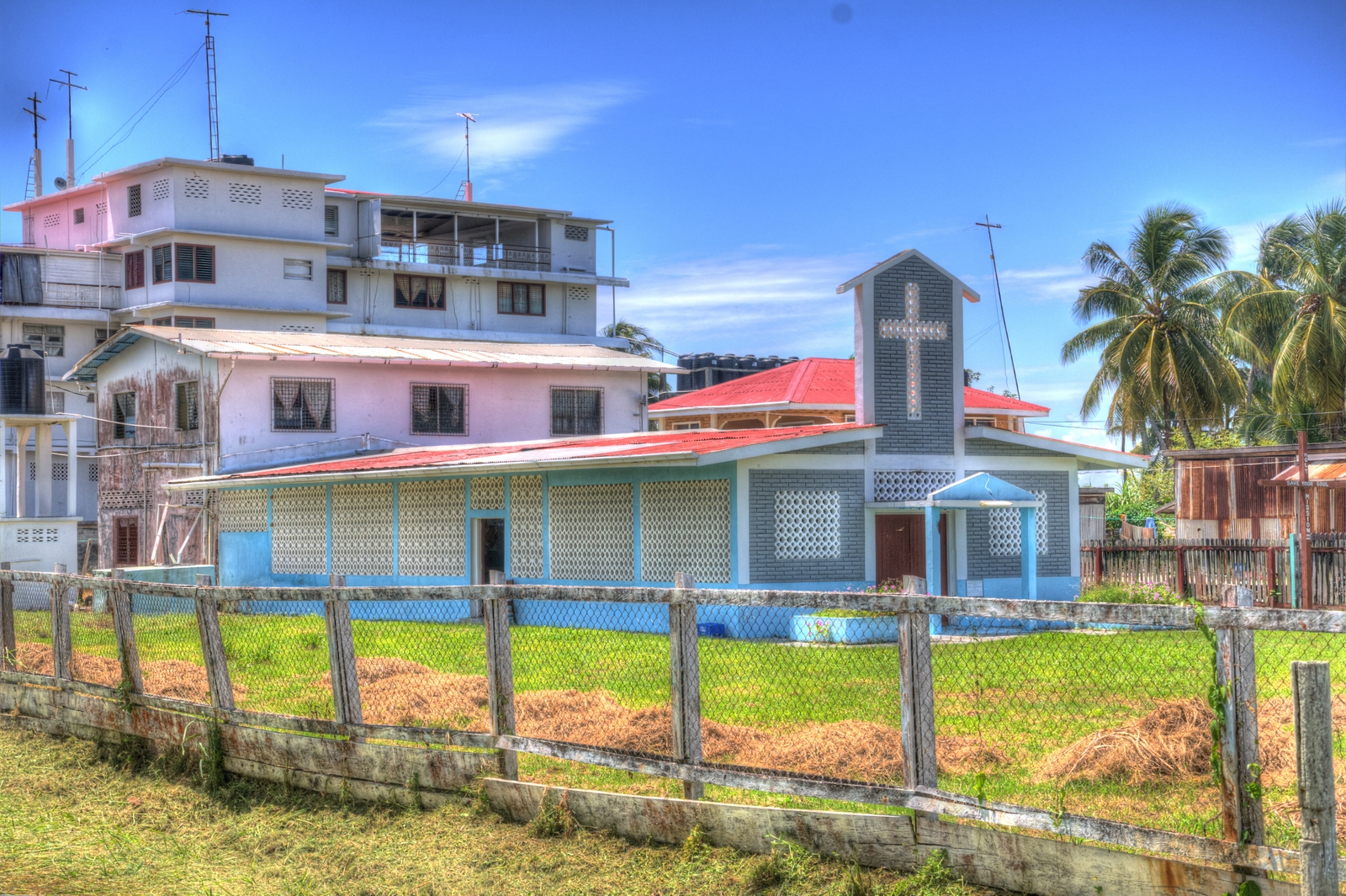
Henrietta Catholic Church

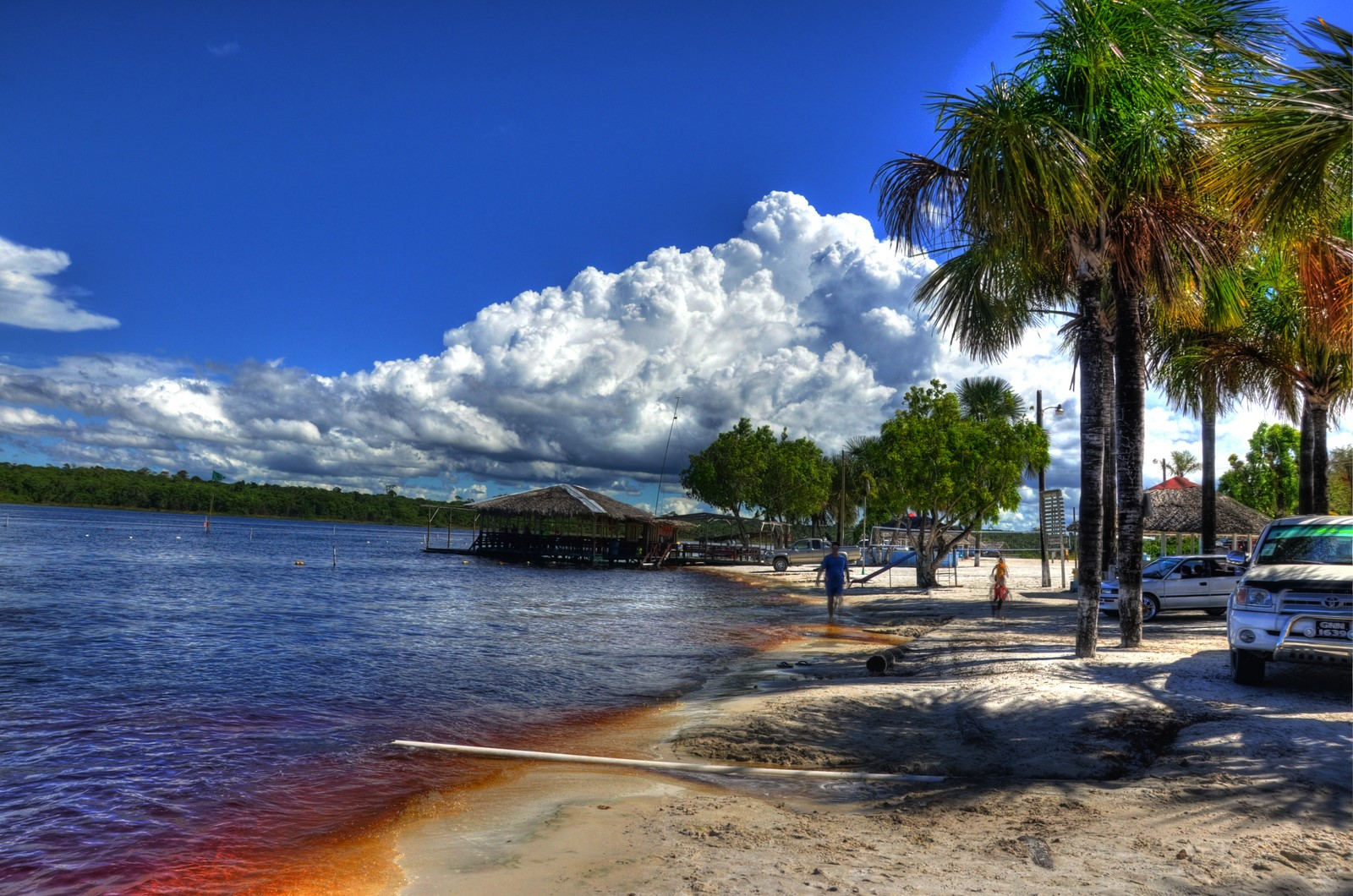
Mainstay Lake

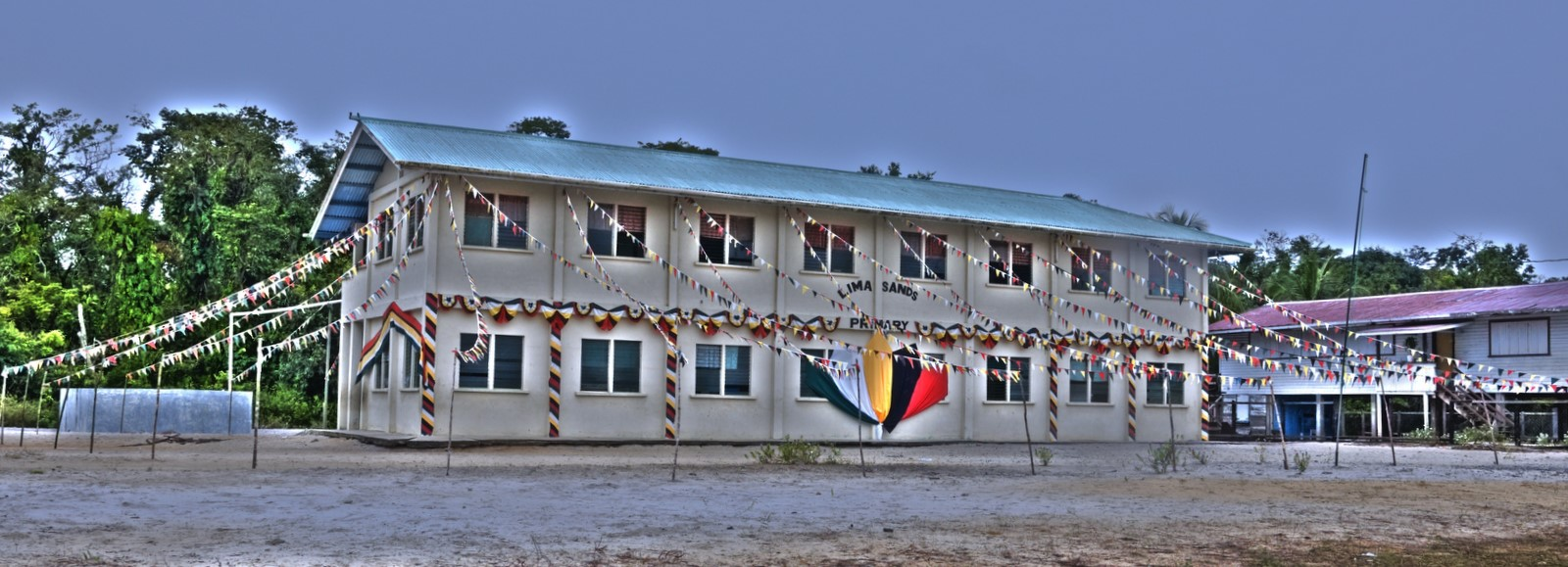
Lima Sands Primary School

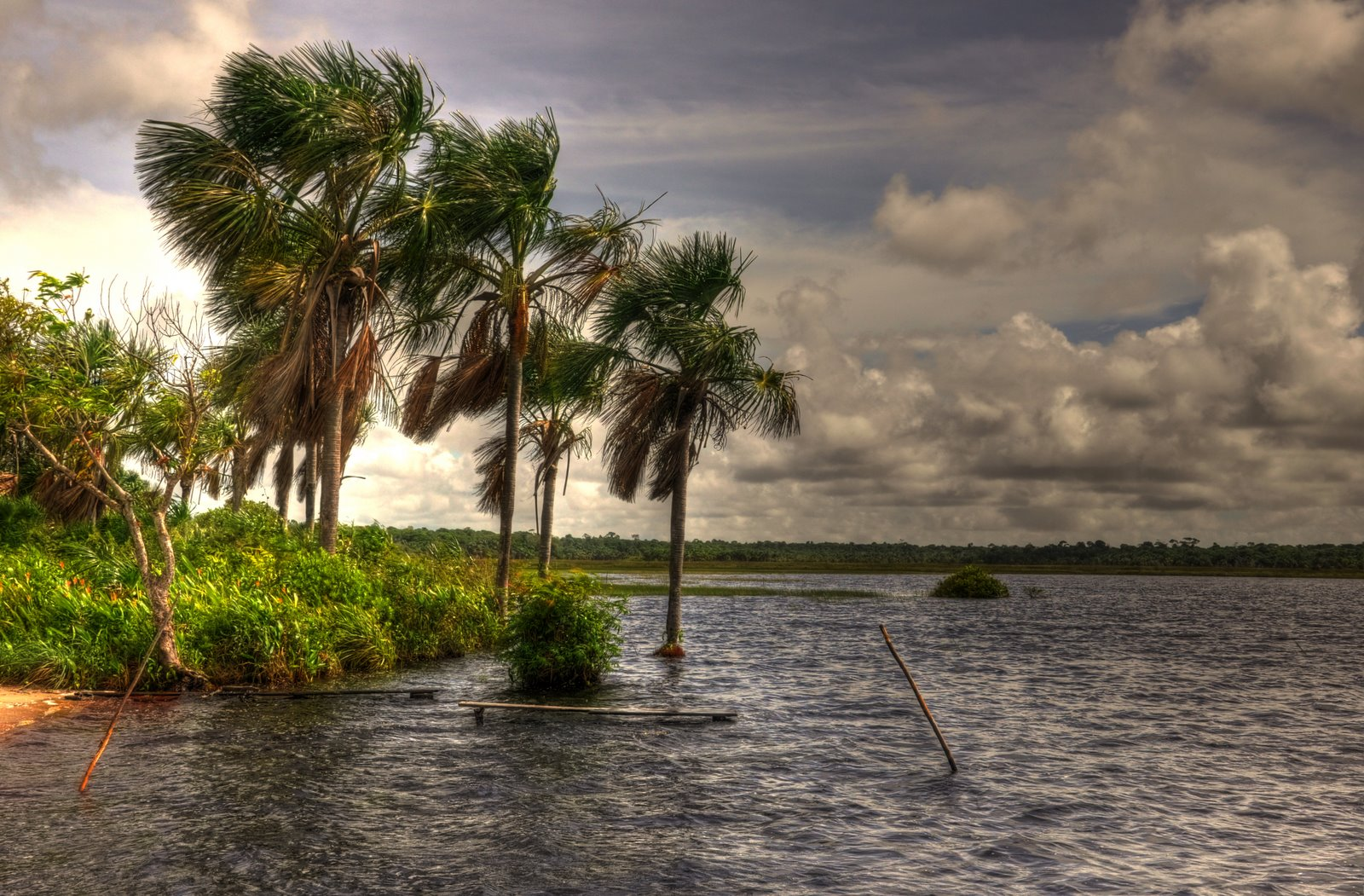
Capoey Lake

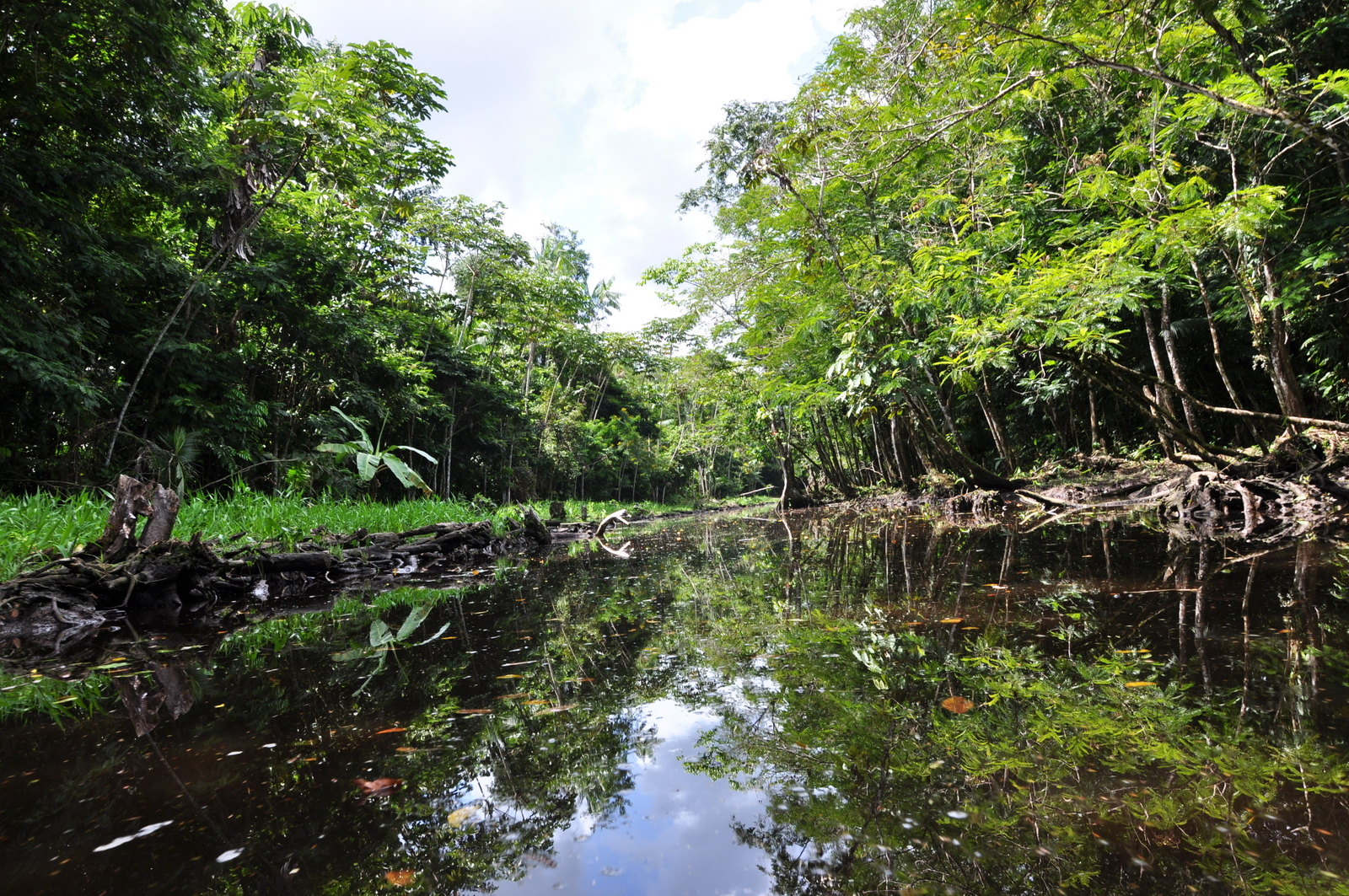
Siriki Creek
