= Pomeroon River =

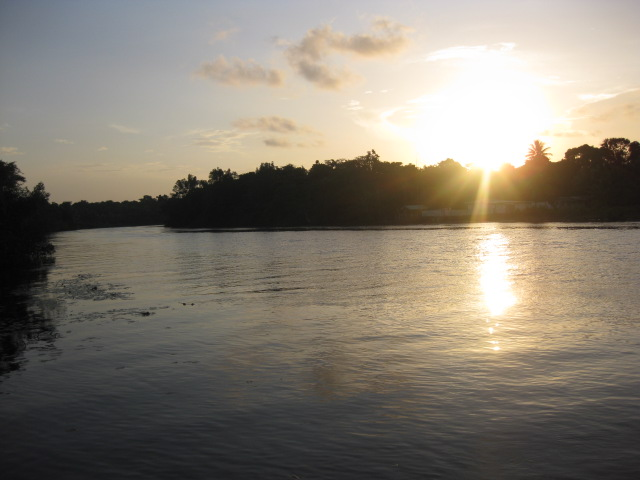

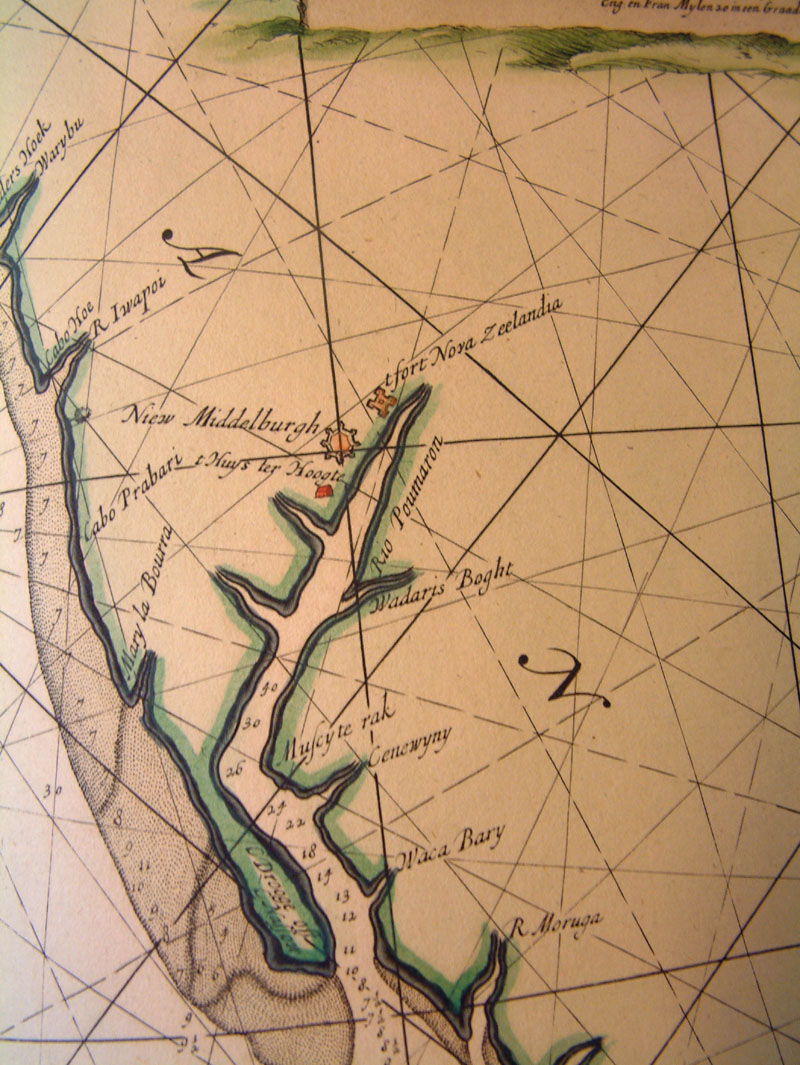
- Old Map of Pomeroon River (1688)

- Location of mouth

Location
- Country: Guyana; Claimed by Venezuela

Physical characteristics
- Mouth: Atlantic Ocean
  - coordinates: 7°37′N 58°45′W
  - elevation: Sea level

The Pomeroon River (also Río Pomerón or Pomaron) is located in Guyana, South America, situated between the Orinoco and the Essequibo rivers. The area has long been inhabited by Lokono people. The Pomeroon River is also one of the deepest rivers in Guyana.

Pomeroon is within the Guyana coastal plain and the area is populated with mangrove swamp vegetation. Siriki Creek is an estuary of the Pomeroon River. The mouth of the river has been deflected from pouring straight into the Atlantic ocean by a sandy spit that redirects the river to the northwest via the Cozier Canal.

== History ==
According to the London Encyclopaedia of 1829, this river was once regarded as the western boundary between the Demerara and Essequibo Colony and Spanish Guiana.

== Use ==
Coconuts are a major agricultural product in the Pomeroon area, grown for their water and copra.

Tapakuma is a tributary of the Pomeroon River that was developed into a water conservancy which greatly improved cultivation of rice.

== Settlement ==
Shell mounds associated with early human burials dated to the pre-ceramic Alaka phase have been unearthed in the area.

In 1581, the Dutch founded a colony on the banks of the river. The settlement was destroyed by Lokono people in alliance with Spaniards in 1596. In 1658, lured by the Dutch advertisement to colonize the Essequibo, a Jewish colony settled within the Dutch lands on the Pomeroon. Their plantations were destroyed when the British of Barbados invaded in 1665 and most moved on to Suriname.

An Anglican mission was established in 1840 by William Henry Brett. In Brett's travelogue, the eastern bank of the mouth of the Pomeroon was called Cape Nassau, and the river's source was in the Imataka Mountains. The largest tributary was the Arapaiaco River, located 43 miles from the sea. Bouruma was another name for the river. He observed various Amerindian tribes settled along the river, including Warao and Lokono, as well as former plantation slaves.

Settlements on the Pomeroon include the town of Charity, and Kabakaburi (an Amerindian mission settlement founded by Brett, located 16 miles up from Charity).

== See also ==
- List of rivers of Guyana
- List of rivers of the Americas by coastline
- Agriculture in Guyana
- History of the Jews in Guyana
