= Regions of Guyana =

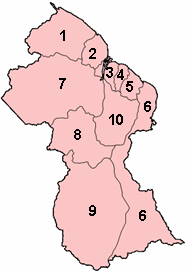
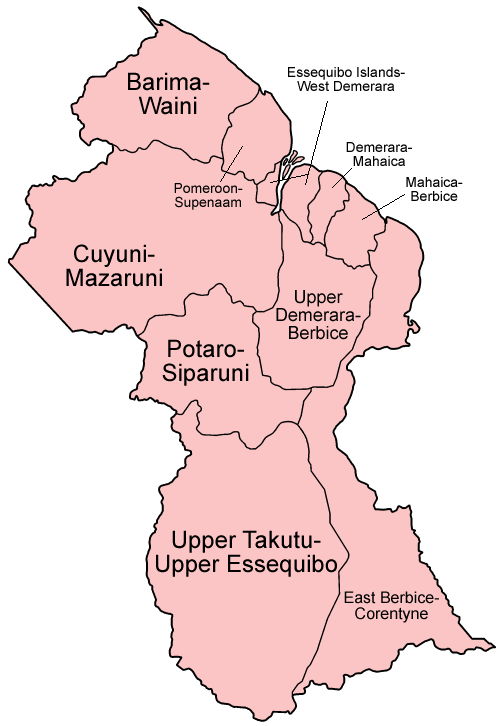
Regions of Guyana by number and name

Guyana is divided into 10 regions:

No.	Region	Area (km^{2})	Pop. (2012)	Pop. per km^{2}	Capital
1	Barima-Waini	20,339	26,941	1.3	Mabaruma
2	Pomeroon-Supenaam	6,195	46,810	7.6	Anna Regina
3	Essequibo Islands-West Demerara	3,755	107,416	28.6	Vreed en Hoop
4	Demerara-Mahaica	2,232	313,429	140.4	Georgetown
5	Mahaica-Berbice	4,190	49,723	11.9	Fort Wellington
6	East Berbice-Corentyne	36,234	109,431	3.0	New Amsterdam
7	Cuyuni-Mazaruni	47,213	20,280	0.4	Bartica
8	Potaro-Siparuni	20,051	10,190	0.5	Mahdia
9	Upper Takutu-Upper Essequibo	57,750	24,212	0.4	Lethem
10	Upper Demerara-Berbice	17,040	39,452	2.3	Linden
	Guyana	214,999	747,884	3.5	Georgetown

Each Region is administered by a Regional Democratic Council (RDC) which is headed by a Chairman. The Regions are divided into neighbourhood councils, known as Neighbourhood Democratic Councils (NDCs).

The current regional structure was established by the Local Democratic Organs Act in 1980. The hyphenated names indicate the name of the rivers that define their border.

== Historical divisions ==
Previous regional names:

=== Regions of Guyana (1971) ===
- East Berbice-Corentyne
- East Demerara-West Coast Berbice
- Mazaruni Potaro
- North West
- Rupununi
- West Demerara-Essequibo Coast

=== Regions of British Guiana (1958) ===
- East Berbice
- Essequibo
- Essequibo Islands
- North west (hinterlands)
- Mazaruni-Potaro (hinterlands)
- Rupununi (hinterlands)

== Colonial counties (before 1958) ==
- Essequibo
- Demerara
- Berbice

== Lands inhabited by Indigenous peoples ==
- Epira Amerindian District (East Berbice-Corentyne Area)
- Epira Amerindian Reservation (East Berbice-Corentyne Area)
- Kanuku Amerindian District (Upper Takutu-Upper Essequibo Area)
- Karasabai Amerindian District (Upper Takutu-Upper Essequibo Area)
- Orealla Amerindian District (East Berbice-Corentyne Area)
- Orealla Amerindian Reservation (East Berbice-Corentyne Area)
- Pomeroon-Ituribisi Amerindian District (Pomeroon-Supenaam Area)
- Pomeroon-Ituribisi Indian Reservation (Pomeroon-Supenaam Area)
- Pomeroon-Ituribisi Reservation (Pomeroon-Supenaam Area)
- Saint Francis Amerindian District (Guyana Area)
- Santa Amerindian District (Essequibo Islands-West Demerara Area)
- Wikki Amerindian District (Upper Demerara-Berbice Area)
- Wikki Amerindian Reservation (Upper Demerara-Berbice Area)
- Wikki Indian Reservation (Upper Demerara-Berbice Area)

== See also ==
- ISO 3166-2:GY
- List of Caribbean First-level Subdivisions by Total Area
- List of Guyanese regions by Human Development Index
