= List of Afro-Guyanese people =

The following is a list of prominent Afro-Guyanese, or people of Afro-Guyanese descent.

== Notable people of Guyanese descent ==
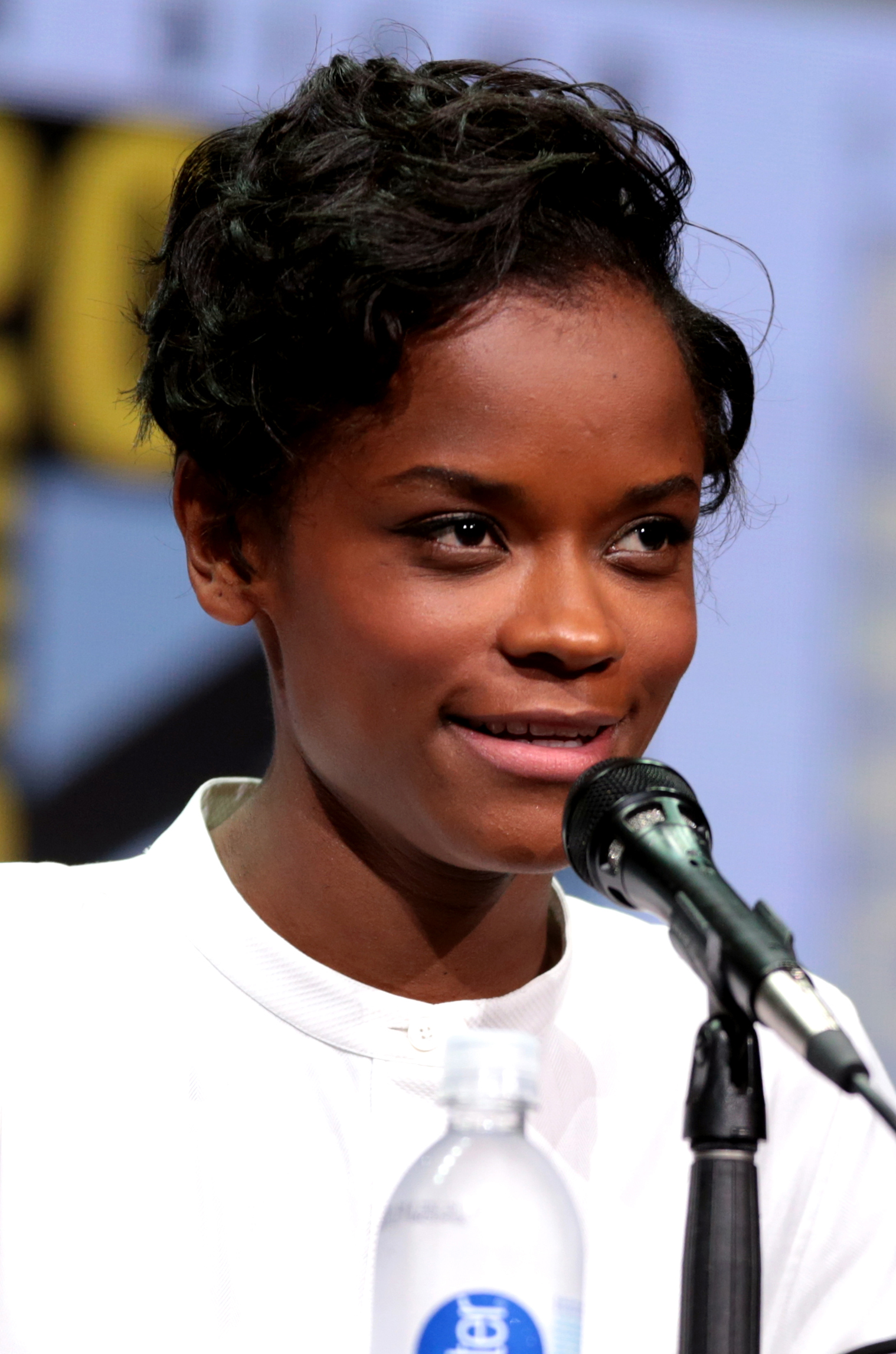
Letitia Wright, actress (Shuri in Black Panther)

- Deborah Cox, Canadian R&B singer-songwriter with longest-running #1 R&B track on charts
- Jason David, Canadian-born American football cornerback
- JDiggz, Canadian rapper, Afro-Guyanese mother
- Melanie Fiona, Canadian R&B singer-songwriter, who is also of Indo-Guyanese descent
- Nubya Garcia, English saxophonist and jazz musician, Guyanese mother
- David Lammy, British-born politician and lawyer
- Tessa McWatt, Guyanese-born Canadian writer
- Des'ree, English singer, Afro-Guyanese mother
- Sonnet L'Abbé, Canadian writer
- Yolanda T. Marshall, Guyanese-born Canadian writer
- Dawnn Lewis, American actress
- Leona Lewis, singer and the first winner of The X Factor (series 3), Guyanese father
- Jermain Jackman, singer and The Voice UK (2015) winner
- Derek Luke, American actor
- Maestro, Canadian rapper and actor
- Nicole Narain, Playboy model, has an Afro-Guyanese mother and her father, who is of mixed Indo-Guyanese and Chinese-Guyanese descent
- Trevor Phillips, British politician
- CCH Pounder, Guyanese-born American actress
- Joy Reid, American news correspondent for MSNBC, Afro-Guyanese mother
- Rihanna, Barbados-born singer/billionaire, Afro-Guyanese mother
- Saukrates, Canadian rapper/singer
- Eon Sinclair, bassist of Canadian rock/ska/reggae band Bedouin Soundclash
- Sean Patrick Thomas, actor (Save the Last Dance and Barbershop)
- Phil Lynott, English-born frontman of the Irish rock band Thin Lizzy, Afro-Guyanese father
- Wretch 32, British rapper, Guyanese mother
- Vanessa Lee Chester, former American child actress (A Little Princess, Harriet the Spy, and The Lost World: Jurassic Park)
- Letitia Wright, actress, who is best-known for playing Shuri in the 2018 film version of Black Panther and the 2022 sequel Black Panther: Wakanda Forever
- Roy Woods, Canadian R&B artist
- Saint JHN, Guyanese-American rapper
- Shaunette Renée Wilson, Guyanese-born American actress (The Resident, Billions and Black Panther)

== Arts ==
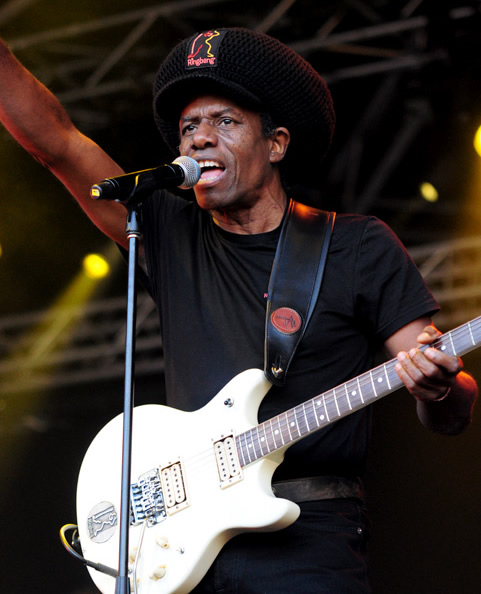
Eddy Grant, musician

- Eddy Grant, musician
- Ram John Holder, actor and musician
- Preme, Canadian rapper
- Red Café, Guyanese-American rapper

== Sports ==
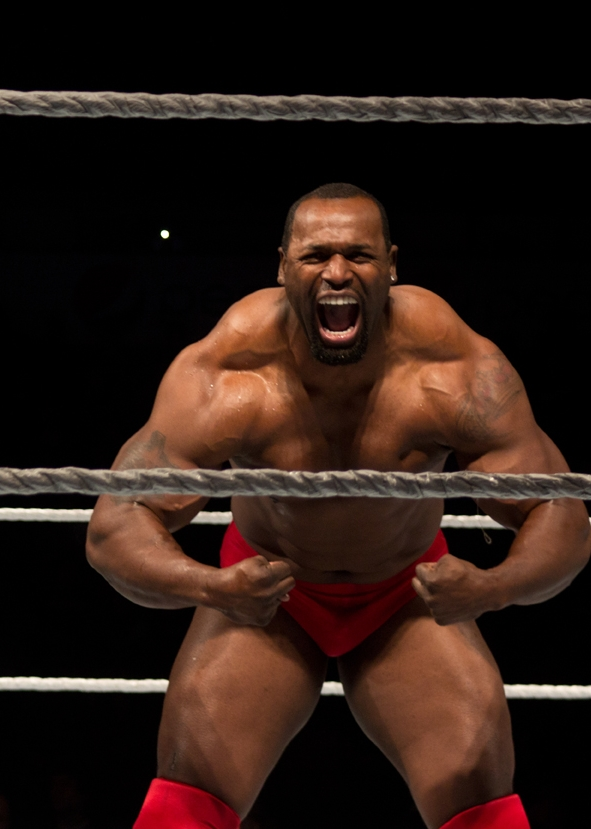
Ezekiel Jackson, Professional wrestler

- Clifford Anderson, former British Empire featherweight contender
- Basil Butcher, former Guyanese and West Indian cricketer
- Colin Croft, former Guyanese and West Indian cricketer
- Chelsea Edghill, Guyanese table tennis player
- Roy Fredericks, former Guyanese and West Indian cricketer
- Lance Gibbs, former Guyanese and West Indian cricketer
- Vivian Harris, former WBA super lightweight champion
- Roger Harper, former Guyanese and West Indian cricketer
- Carl Hooper, former West Indian cricket captain
- Ezekiel Jackson, professional wrestler
- Clayton Lambert, American, Guyanese and West Indian cricketer, scored the most runs for Guyana
- Andrew Lewis, former WBA welterweight champion
- Clive Lloyd, former Guyanese and West Indian cricketer
- Aliann Pompey, Guyanese 400-meter sprinter
- Alana Shipp, Barbadian IFBB professional bodybuilder
- Mark McKoy, Guyanese-born Canadian sprinter
- Michael Anthony, Guyanese Boxer

== Politicians and social leaders ==
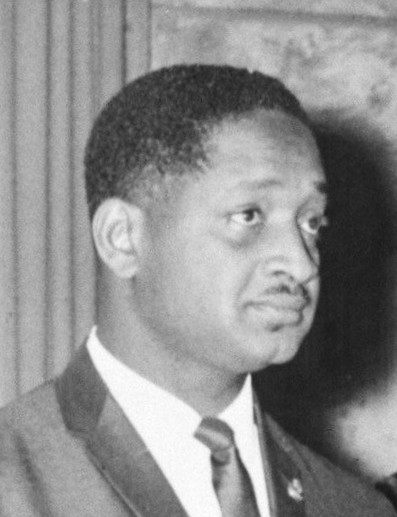
Forbes Burnham, President of Guyana from 1980 to 1985

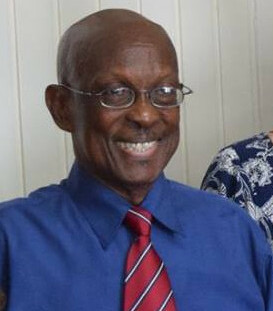
Hamilton Green, first Muslim Prime Minister of Guyana, and in the Western world, 1985–1992

- Forbes Burnham, President of Guyana, 1980–1985
- Hubert Nathaniel Critchlow, father of the trade union movement in British Guiana
- Cuffy, leader of the Berbice slave uprising
- Karen de Souza (born 1958), women and children's activist
- Jack Gladstone, leader of the Demerara rebellion of 1823
- David A. Granger, President of Guyana
- Hamilton Green, 1st Muslim Prime Minister of Guyana, and in the Western world, 1985–1992
- Desmond Hoyte, President of Guyana, 1985–1992
- Sam Hinds, former President of Guyana, Prime Minister of Guyana
- Eusi Kwayana, former Guyanese cabinet member and veteran politician
- Lincoln Lewis, trade union leader
- Quamina, leader of the Demerara rebellion of 1823
- Ptolemy Reid, former Prime Minister of Guyana

== Academics ==
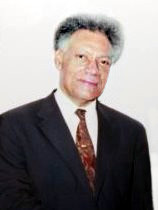
Ivan Gladstone Van Sertima, associate professor of Africana Studies at Rutgers University

- John Agard, playwright, poet and children's writer
- George Granville Monah James, historian and author
- Egbert Martin, 19th-century Guyanese poet of mixed African and European ancestry
- Walter Rodney, historian and political activist
- Ivan Gladstone Van Sertima, associate professor of Africana Studies at Rutgers University

== Models ==
- Arti Cameron
