= Fred Abraham =

Fred Abraham may refer to:

- Fred Abraham Sr. (1859–1901/1918), British Guianese cricketer
- Fred Abraham Jr. (1886–1918), British Guianese cricketer, killed in the First World War
