= Scouting and Guiding in Guyana =

Scouting and Guiding associations in Guyana

The Scout and Guide movement in Guyana is served by two organisations

- Guyana Girl Guides Association, member of the World Association of Girl Guides and Girl Scouts
- The Scout Association of Guyana, member of the World Organization of the Scout Movement
