= Guyana National Service =

Public service organization overview
- Formed: 1971
- Dissolved: 2000

The Guyana National Service was a public service organization, including a paramilitary element, formed in Guyana in 1973 and disbanded in 2000, amidst some controversy.

== Function ==
The service was created following recommendations by United Nations consultant Robert F. Landor, to address youth unemployment and modeled after the National Service of Tanzania. "Prime Minister Burnham authorized the formation of the Guyana National Service in 1974 as a 1,500-person paramilitary force. He envisioned it as a way to mobilize the youth of Guyana. GNS recruits ranged from ages eight to twenty-five." Guyanese youths who joined, mostly aged 15–20, were sent to three months of military training, followed by agricultural training.

== Opinion ==
Some people argued that it was a thinly veiled military arm directly under the president, with the leadership of the organization coming from Guyana's police and defense forces. It also became compulsory for graduating from the University of Guyana.

The organization reduced the numbers of The Scout Association of Guyana, which it competed with for the recruitment of youth. Over the course of its existence over 20,000 people were part of the Guyana National Service.

Others viewed the GNS as patriotic; seeing and helping to develop Guyana's hinterland while learning life skills to give youth a "sense of value, a sense of worthwhileness". In bringing together Guyanese from all backgrounds, it served to create unity among the stratified society.

== Legacy ==
A notable member was researcher Karen de Souza, who began working as a volunteer in the Guyana National Service in 1975, learning electrical skills and giving reading courses to illiterates.

Worldwide ex-GNS reunions were held in 2012 and 2015.
