= John Smith (missionary) =

English missionary (1790-1824)

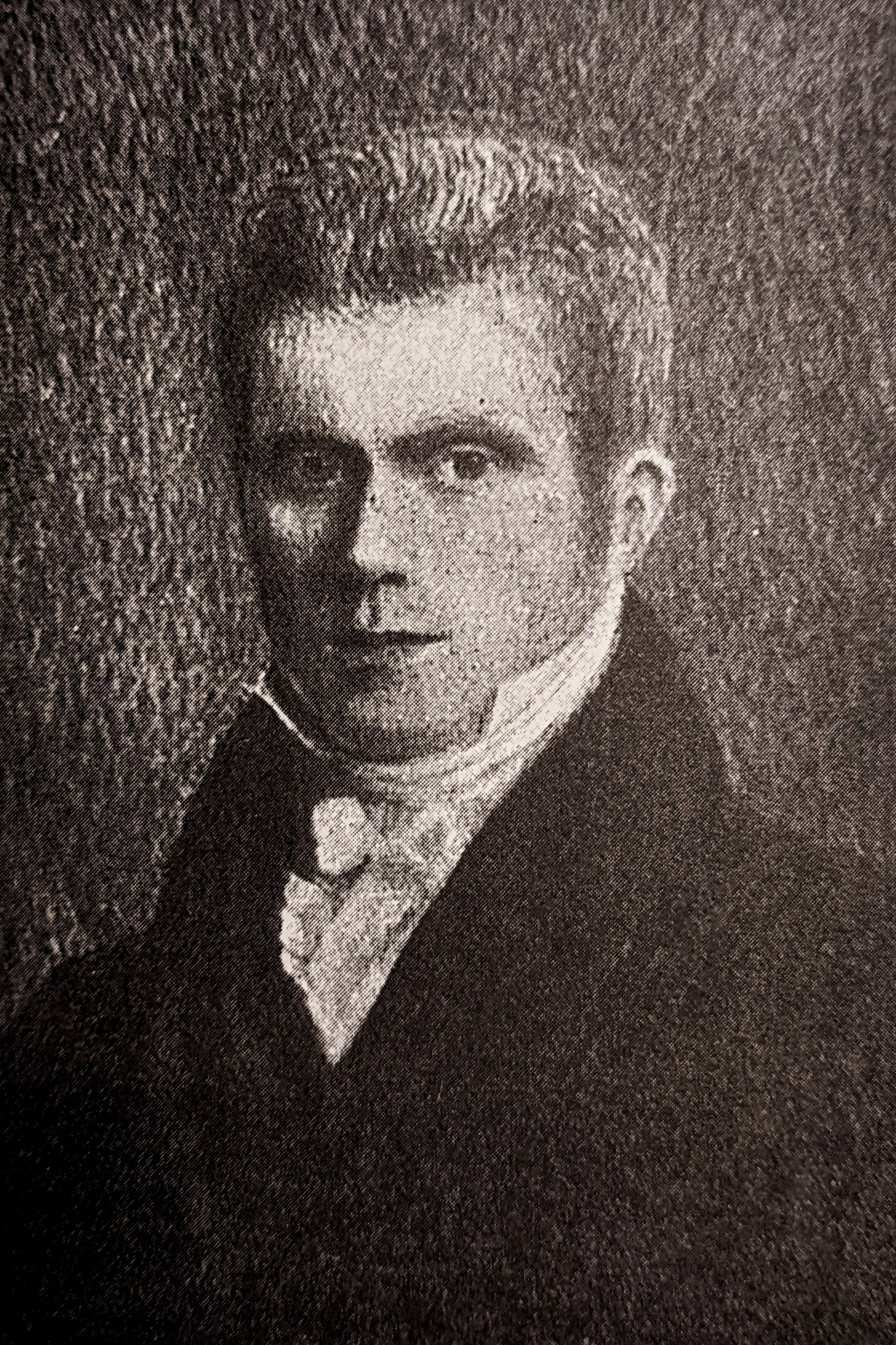
- Born: 27 June 1790; Northamptonshire, United Kingdom
- Died: 6 February 1824 (aged 33); New Amsterdam, Demerara
- Occupation: missionary

John Smith (27 June 1790 – 6 February 1824) was an English missionary and abolitionist whose experiences in the British West Indies attracted the attention of the anti-slavery campaigner William Wilberforce. As a result of his actions, trial by court-martial and subsequent death whilst under imprisonment, Smith became known as the "Demerara Martyr". His case, and news of the enormous size of the uprising and the brutal loss of African life, caused a great awakening in England, strengthening the abolitionist cause which eventually succeeded in British territories worldwide in 1838.

== Biography ==
Smith was born an orphan on 27 June 1790 in Northamptonshire. He received his early education only at Sunday school, and trained to be a baker, after which he applied to be a missionary. He married Jane Godden. On 12 December 1816 he was ordained at Tonbridge Chapel.

Smith arrived in Demerara under the auspices of the London Missionary Society on 23 February 1817. He lived at the 'Le Resouvenir' plantation, where he preached at Bethel Chapel, primarily attended by African slaves.

In the morning of 18 August 1823, in what is known as the 'Demerara rebellion of 1823', about ten to twelve thousand slaves drawn from plantations on the East Coast of the Demerara colony rebelled, under the belief that their masters were concealing news of the slaves' emancipation.

Smith was subsequently charged with promoting discontent and dissatisfaction in the minds of the African slaves, exciting the slaves to rebel, and failing to notify the authorities that the slaves intended to rebel. In his trial he was defended by William Arrindell. John Smith was arraigned in a court-martial before Lt. Col. Goodman on 13 October.

Smith's trial concluded one month later, on 24 November; Smith was found guilty of the principal charges, and was given the death sentence; he was transferred from Colony House to prison. The contemporary account by Bryant suggested that a pre-existing illness was the cause of Smith's demise on 6 February 1824, before the intended Royal reprieve arrived; he asserted that Smith had been ill for some time, but that his accommodation was airy and spacious and that had been looked after with "utmost attention and kindness". Others, namely Jakobssen (1972) Craton (1982), however, state that Smith died in a damp prison of consumption. Out of fear of stirring up slave sentiment, the colonists interred him at four a.m., without marking his grave. His death was a major step forward in the campaign to abolish slavery. News of his death was published in British newspapers, provoked enormous outrage and garnered 200 petitions to Parliament.

== See also ==
- Quamina
- Jack Gladstone
