= Quamina =

Leader of the Demerara Rebellion of 1823

- Image set in dome in the GBTI building in Guyana
- Born: 1778; Fante Confederacy (now in Ghana)
- Died: 16 September 1823; Chateau Margot, Demerara-Essequibo, British Empire (now in Demerara-Mahaica, Guyana)
- Occupations: slave-carpenter, deacon
- Known for: Demerara rebellion of 1823

Quamina Gladstone (c. 1778 – 16 September 1823), most often referred to simply as Quamina, was a Guyanese slave from Africa and father of Jack Gladstone. He and his son were involved in the Demerara rebellion of 1823, one of the largest slave revolts in the British colonies before slavery was abolished.

He was a carpenter by trade, and worked on an estate owned by Sir John Gladstone, the father of future British Prime Minister William Ewart Gladstone. Quamina was implicated in the revolt by the colonial authorities and killed by British soldiers on 16 September 1823. He is considered a national hero in Guyana. After independence, Murray Street in the capital Georgetown was renamed after Quamina, and the village of Beterverwagting on the East Coast Demerara has a street named after him.

== Biography ==
Quamina was a carpenter who lived and worked on the "Success" plantation in Demerara. According to da Costa, Quamina was African-born (originated from the Akan ethnic group in modern-day Ghana), most likely from the Fante subgroup. He and his mother were sold into slavery when he was a child. His mother died on a plantation in 1817. In some source material, he is surnamed Gladstone, as the enslaved adopted surnames of their masters by convention. Sir John Gladstone, who had never set foot on his plantation, had acquired half share in the plantation in 1812 through mortgage default; he acquired the remaining half four years later.

He attended services at the Bethel Chapel of the London Missionary Society on neighbouring Le Resouvenir plantation when the chapel opened in 1808. Under the guidance of Reverend John Wray, he learned to read and write. As was witnessed in a letter he wrote to the LMS, he was persuaded to attend the recently opened church by the person who he served as apprentice. Wray noticed positive changes after he became Christian. Quamina was proud and hardworking, and was baptised on 26 December 1808. On being assessed for fitness to become a member, Quamina declared that when he was young, he had been a houseboy and had to "fetch" girls to entertain the estate's managers. When Wray was sent to nearby Berbice in 1816, his replacement John Smith was equally impressed by Quamina's qualities. He took an interest in others, and had become widely respected by slaves and free blacks throughout the colony. One of five slaves elected deacon by the congregation in 1817, Quamina became Smith's personal favourite, and was highly trusted by John Smith and his wife, Jane. According to da Costa, he was a "loyal, well-behaved, trustworthy and pious deacon." He brought news of the congregation members on a day-to-day basis, and was always consulted about the affairs of any member.

Quamina had many wives, but he cohabited for twenty years with Peggy, a free woman. As was common with other slaves, he had been harshly treated and humiliated by his masters and once was beaten badly and incapacitated for six weeks. He was frequently forced to work, thus missing religious services. In 1822, when Peggy was taken seriously ill, he was forced to work all day, every day, and was not allowed any time off to look after her. One evening, he returned to find her dead.

== The revolt ==
Being very close to Jack, Quamina supported his son's aspirations to be free, by supporting the fight for the rights of slaves. But he was at the same time a rational man. He had been troubled for some time by rumours he had heard about an emancipation ordered by Britain that was being withheld by the colonists. Rev. John Smith noted in a private journal entry on 25 July that Quamina had spoken of the matter. Smith assured him that any announcement would be of measures to improve the slaves' condition, and that the rumours of emancipation were not to be believed. He urged him to tell the other slaves, particularly the Christians, not to rebel and sent Manuel and Seaton on this mission. When he knew the rebellion was imminent, he urged restraint, and made the fellow slaves promise a peaceful strike. News of the planned rebellion had leaked out, and Quamina was arrested by John Stewart, the manager at his plantation, shortly before it was due to start. And although he was set loose by fellow slaves as the rebellion was unfolding, Quamina never took up arms, and even actively prevented Stewart from coming to any harm. After the slaves' defeat in a major battle at "Bachelor's Adventure", Jack fled into the woods. A "handsome reward" of one thousand guilder was offered for the capture of Jack, Quamina and about twenty other "fugitives". Although Jack led thousands of slaves in rebellion, most of the colonists thought the reverse – that Quamina was the ultimate leader, and Jack was merely aiding and abetting it. Jack and his wife were captured by Capt. McTurk at Chateau Margo on 6 September after a three-hour standoff. Quamina remained at large until 16 September. He was fatally shot in the fields of Chateau Margo after refusing to surrender to British soldiers under McTurk's command, and his body was hung up in chains by the side of a public road in front of "Success".

The very low number of white deaths is proof that the uprising was largely peaceful – plantation owners, managers and their families were locked up and not harmed. Hundreds of slaves died during the various battles and skirmishes during the revolt, or were executed as "ringleaders". Jack Gladstone was sold and deported to Saint Lucia. The rebellion helped bring attention to the plight of sugar plantation slaves, accelerating the full abolition of slavery.

== Legacy ==
Quamina is considered a national hero in Guyana. In 1985 the post-independence Guyana renamed Murray Street in Georgetown – named for former Demerara Lieutenant Governor John Murray (1813–1824) who was in charge of the colony during the unrest and rebellion – Quamina Street in his honour. A monument to him was erected at the junction of Quamina and Carmichael Streets. He is equally depicted in a mural in the dome at the headquarters of the Guyana Bank for Trade and Industry (GBTI) building in Water Street, Georgetown.

== See also ==
- Abolition of slavery timeline
- Anti-Slavery Society
- Bussa
- Cuffy (Guyanese rebel)
- List of kidnappings
- List of opponents of slavery
- List of solved missing person cases (pre-1950)
- Samuel Sharpe
- Toussaint L'ouverture
- Vincent Ogé
