= Caribbean Scout Jamboree =

The Caribbean Scout Jamboree is a periodic gathering for Boy Scouts in the Caribbean, held at intervals since 1952, when the First Caribbean Jamboree was held at Briggs Park, in Kingston, Jamaica. Past Jamborees include:

== List of Caribbean Scout Jamborees ==
Event	Location	HDate
1st Caribbean Jamboree	Jamaica	1952
2nd Caribbean Jamboree	Trinidad and Tobago	1961
3rd Caribbean Jamboree	Guyana	1969
4th Caribbean Jamboree	Barbados	1972
5th Caribbean Jamboree	Suriname	1974
6th Caribbean Jamboree	Jamaica	1977
7th Caribbean Jamboree	Trinidad and Tobago	1980
8th Caribbean Jamboree	Suriname	1984 (cancelled)
9th Caribbean Jamboree	Barbados	1987
10th Caribbean Jamboree	Dominica	1994
11th Caribbean Jamboree	Trinidad and Tobago	1997
12th Caribbean Jamboree	Saint Lucia	2000
13th Caribbean Jamboree	Guyana	2003 (cancelled)
13th Caribbean Jamboree	Jamaica	2006
14th Caribbean Jamboree	Guyana	2009
15th Caribbean Jamboree	Curaçao	2014

== Caribbean Cuboree ==
The Caribbean Cuboree is an event for Cub Scouts living in the Caribbean. It is held every three years and lasts for several days.

=== Dates, locations and themes ===
- 4th - 1985 - Grenada
- 5th - 1988 - Dominica
- 6th - 1991 - Jamaica
- 9th - 2001 - Barbados
- 10th - 2004 - Grenada - Cubs in Spice, Expanding Horizons
- 11th - 2007 - Trinidad and Tobago
- 12th - 2010 - Curaçao - The Incredible Supercub in the Jungle City

== See also ==
- Scouting and Guiding in Guyana
