= Antony Beaujon =

Lieutenant governor of Demarara and Essequibo
- In office 13 August 1804 – 17 October 1805
- Monarch: George III
- Preceded by: Robert Nicholson
- Succeeded by: James Montgomery

Commander of Demarara
- In office 22 April 1796 – 5 July 1802
- Monarch: George III

Director-General of Demarara
- In office May 1795 – 22 April 1796
- Preceded by: Willem Sirtema van Grovestins
- Succeeded by: position abolished

Personal details
- Born: c. 1763 Sint Eustatius
- Died: 17 October 1805 (aged 42) Stabroek, Demerara (nowaday: Georgetown, Guyana
- Occupation: civil servant and politician

Antony Beaujon also Anthony (c. 1763 – 17 October 1805) was a Dutch and British civil servant and politician in Guyana. He served as Governor of Demarara (Note: The official title was Director-General during the Dutch period, and was changed to Commander during the British period.) from May 1795 until 5 July 1802, and as Lieutenant governor of Demerara and Essequibo from 13 August 1804 until his death.

== Biography ==
Beaujon was born in Sint Eustatius in a family of merchants. In the 1790s, he was member of the Court of Policy of the Dutch colonies Demerara and Essequibo, and served as Secretary of Demarara. On 18 January 1795, William V, Prince of Orange fled from the Netherlands, and went into exile in Great-Britain. While in exile, Willem V started writing the Kew Letters to the colonial governors urging them to submit to Great-Britain. On 23 April 1795, Governor baron Willem August Sirtema van Grovestins discussed the matter with the Court of Policy, however the Patriots (Republicans) outnumbered the Orangists (traditionalists and nobility), and the colonies remained part of the Batavian Republic.

On 4 May 1795, HMS Zebra arrived in the harbour of Stabroek (nowadays: Georgetown) offering British protection against a possible French attack. The Court of Policy issued a statement that they could not accept the offer. Governor Sirtema van Grovestins boarded HMS Zebra which sailed away on 6 May, and Beaujon was appointed acting Governor of Demarara. On 20 April 1796, a British fleet appeared, and on 22 April, Demerara and Essequibo surrendered to Admiral Rodney without a fight. All laws and customs of the colonies could remain, and the citizens were equal to British subjects. Any government official who swore loyalty to the British crown could remain in function. Beaujon swore an oath of allegiance, and remained in function.

Demerara fared well under British rule, exports increased substantially and the number of slaves more than doubled. The colonies were returned to the Netherlands by the Peace of Amiens. On 5 July 1802, Beaujon was dismissed, and ordered to return to the Netherlands. Fearing a hostile reception, he decided to go to England instead.

On 18 May 1803, war was declared between Great Britain and France, and on 17 September, a British fleet arrived in Demerara which capitulated the next day. Lieutenant Colonel Robert Nicholson became acting Governor. On 13 August 1804, Beaujon had returned from England, and was installed as Lieutenant governor of Demerara and Essequibo.

On 17 October 1805, Beaujon died in Stabroek, at the age of 42.

== Bibliography ==
- Netscher, Pieter Marinus (1888). Geschiedenis van de koloniën Essequebo, Demerary en Berbice, van de vestiging der Nederlanders aldaar tot op onzen tijd (in Dutch). The Hague: Martinus Nijhoff.
