= Pierre Louis de Saffon =

Pierre Louis de Saffon (1724, France – August 1784, Demerara) was a French duellist who settled in Demerara after killing his brother in a duel. After moving to South America, he became a rich planter and owner of multiple estates; he named two of these Le Repentir — the repenting, and La Penitence — the penitence, as a memorial to his brother's death. He died in 1784; he left the revenue from his estates to provide for 10 orphans until they turned 16.
