= Borsselen =

Borsselen Borslem
- former capital and island
- Location in Guyana
- Coordinates: 6.5766°N 58.2267°W
- Country: Guyana
- Region: Essequibo Islands-West Demerara
- Time zone: UTC-4
- Climate: Af

Borsselen (also Borslem) is an island in the Demerara River of Guyana, and was the capital of Demerara between 1755 and 1782.

== History ==
In 1745, Demerara was created as a separate colony out of Essequibo, and was initially governed from Essequibo. The colony grew rapidly, and attracted many English planters. In 1755, Gedney Clarke, a Barbados merchant requested political representation, therefore the administration was moved to the island of Borsselen, 20 miles (32 km) upriver near plantation Soesdyke which was owned by the Governor Laurens Storm van 's Gravesande. Two administrative buildings, a small fort and barracks were built on the island.

The decision was criticised, because the island was hard to defend, and the planters had started to build houses around the guard post near the mouth of the river. In 1765, Jan Cornelis van den Heuvel became governor of Demarara. Van den Heuvel owned plantation de Parel across from the island, but the Dutch West India Company forced him to move to the island with his assistants and clerks. Arguments about the island continued for many years. The settlement near the guard post became known as Stabroek, and in 1782 became the capital of the colony. In 1812, the town was renamed to Georgetown.

== Bibliography ==
- Hartsinck, J.J. (1770). Beschryving van Guiana, of de wilde kust in Zuid-America. Amsterdam: Gerrit Tielenburg.
- Netscher, Pieter Marinus (1888). Geschiedenis van de koloniën Essequebo, Demerary en Berbice, van de vestiging der Nederlanders aldaar tot op onzen tijd (in Dutch). The Hague: Martinus Nijhoff.
- Storm van 's Gravesande, Laurens; Villiers, J.A.J. de (1920). Storm van 's Gravesande: zijn werk en zijn leven uit zijne brieven opgebouwd (in Dutch). The Hague: Nijhoff.
