= Demerara =

1745–1803 Dutch colony in South America

Coordinates: 6.8121°N 58.1701°W

Kolonie Demerary (1745–1803) Colony of Demerara (1803–1812) County of Demerara (1838–1958) Demerara
- 1745–1812; 1838–1958
- Flag (1627–1792) Flag (1803–1812)

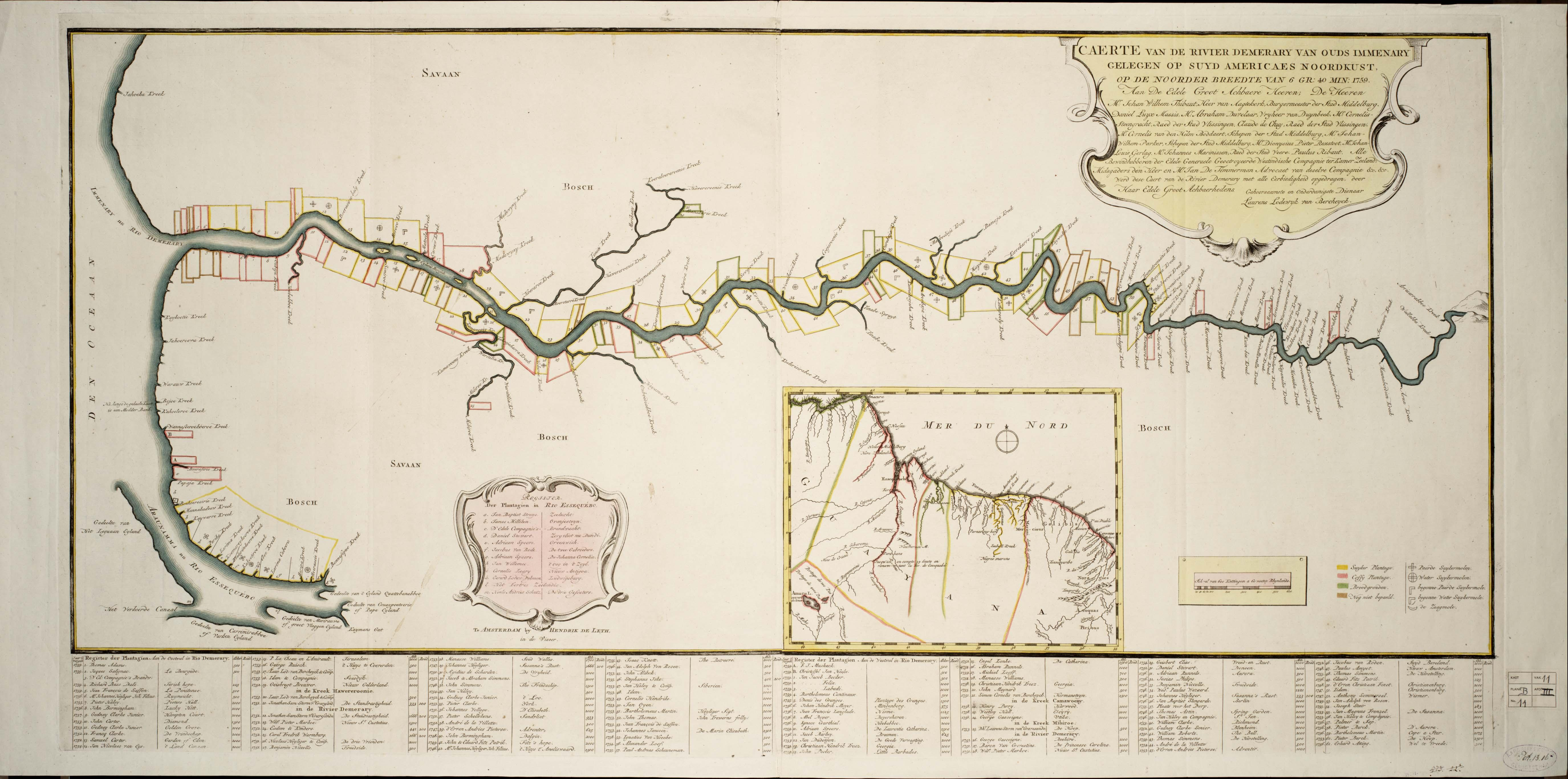
- The Demerara colony in 1759 (Note this map has East at its top.); See here for its exact location (6° 48' N 58° 10' W).
- Status: Colony of the Dutch West India Company (1745–1792); Dutch colony (1792–1815) (Note: After 1803 it was a de jure Dutch colony but was a de facto British colony. Dutch Republic (1792–1795) Batavian Republic/Commonwealth (1795–1806) Kingdom of Holland (1806–1810) First French Empire (1810–1813) Sovereign Principality of the United Netherlands (1813–1815) United Kingdom of the Netherlands (1815)); British occupation (1781–1782; 1796–1802; 1803–1815) (Note: Great Britain (1781–1800) United Kingdom of Great Britain and Ireland (1800–1802)); French occupation (1782–1783); De facto Colony of the United Kingdom (1803–1812); Combined with Essequibo as a de facto Colony of the United Kingdom (1812–1815); Combined with Essequibo as a Colony of the United Kingdom (1815–1831); County of British Guiana (1838–1958)
- Capital: Fort Zeelandia (1745–1755); Borsselen (1755–1782); Stabroek (1782–1815)
- Common languages: Dutch, English, Guyanese Creole, Guyanese Hindustani, Tamil, South Asian languages, African languages, Akawaio, Macushi, Waiwai, Arawakan, Patamona, Warrau, Carib, Wapishana, Arekuna, Portuguese, Spanish, French, Chinese
- Religion: Christianity, Hinduism, Islam, Judaism, Afro-American religions, Traditional African religions, Indigenous religions
- History
  - Established as a Dutch West India Company colony: 18 October 1745
  - Raid on Essequibo and Demerara: 24–27 February 1781
  - Capture of Demerara and Essequibo: 22 January 1782
  - Peace of Paris: 1783
  - Colony of the Dutch Republic: 1 January 1792
  - Treaty of Amiens: 27 March 1802
  - Joined with Essequibo to form Demerara-Essequibo: 28 April 1812
  - Anglo-Dutch Treaty of 1814: 20 November 1815
  - Demerara-Essequibo merges with Berbice to become British Guiana: 21 July 1831
  - County of Demerara: 1838
  - Merged into the new regions: 1958
- Currency: Spanish dollar, Dutch guilder, British Guiana dollar, British West Indies dollar
Preceded by	Succeeded by
Essequibo (colony)	Demerara-Essequibo
- Today part of: Guyana

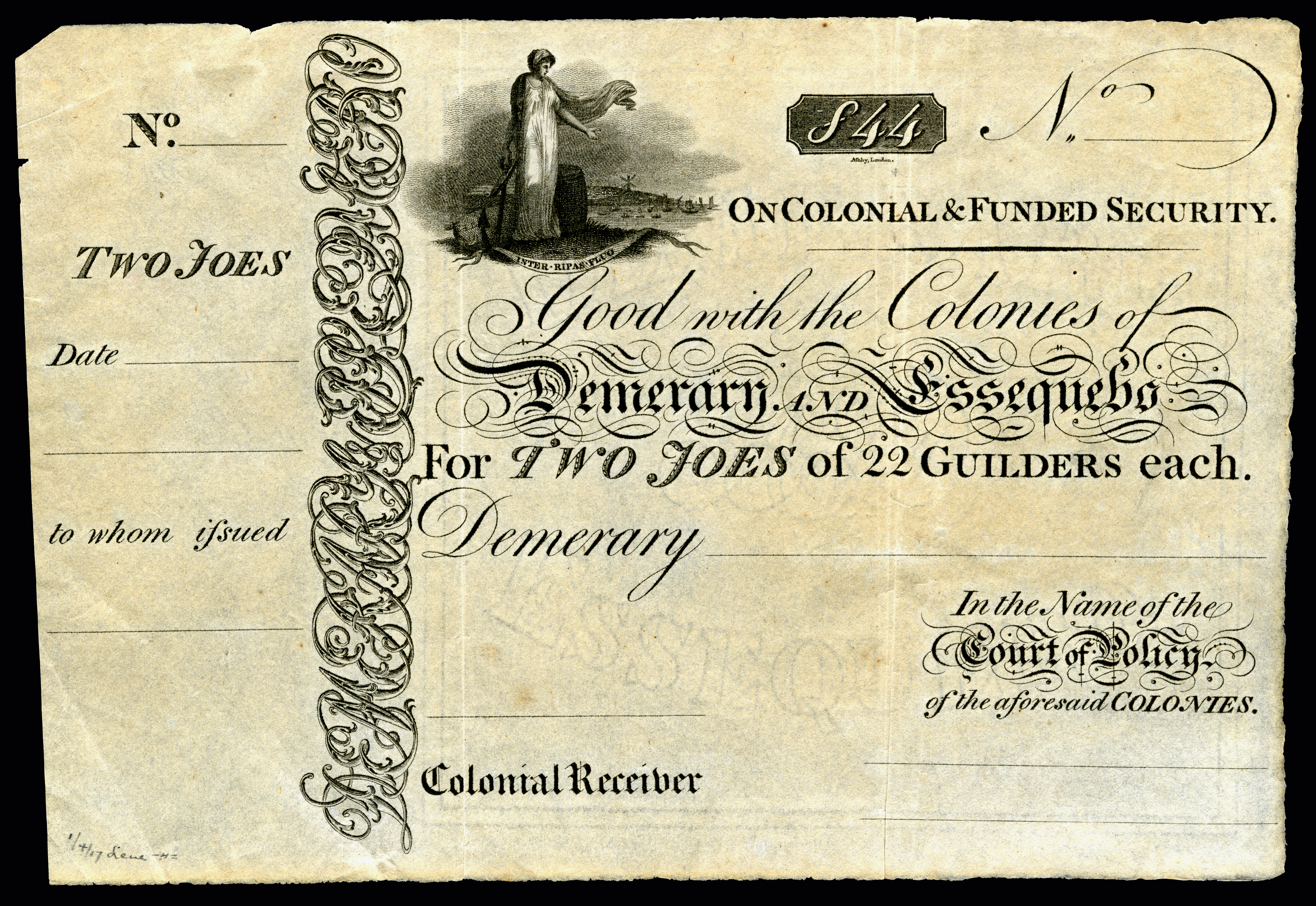
2 Joes (or 44 Dutch Guilders), Colonies of Demerary and Essequebo (1830s), second issue.

Demerara (/ˌdɛməˈrɛərə/; Dutch: Demerary, [ˌdeːməˈraːri]) is a historical region in the Guianas, on the north coast of South America, now part of the country of Guyana. It was a colony of the Dutch West India Company between 1745 and 1792 and a colony of the Dutch state from 1792 until 1815. It was merged with Essequibo in 1812 by the British who took control. It formally became a British colony in 1815 until Demerara-Essequibo was merged with Berbice to form the colony of British Guiana in 1831. In 1838, it became a county of British Guiana until 1958. In 1966, British Guiana gained independence as Guyana and in 1970 it became a republic as the Co-operative Republic of Guyana. It was located around the lower course of the Demerara River, and its main settlement was Georgetown.

The name "Demerara" comes from a variant of the Lokono word immenary or dumaruni, which means "river of the letter wood" (wood of Brosimum guianense tree). Demerara sugar is so named because originally, it came from sugarcane fields in the colony of Demerara.

== History ==
Demerara was first mentioned in 1691 as a trading post. On 18 October 1745, Demerara was created as a separate colony, even though it was located on an unoccupied part of Essequibo, because the people from the province of Holland wanted to settle there and Essequibo was part of Zeeland. In the founding documents, it was mentioned that the colonists should live in peace with the Amerindian population and respect their territories, because they fought with the colony of Essequibo against the French privateers and helped to chase them off. The Amerindians were considered free people, and they were not allowed to enslave them.

The first planter was Andries Pieterse who already owned a plantation in Essequibo. Half a year later, there were 18 large sugar plantations and 50 smaller plantations. The colony was initially governed from Fort Zeelandia by Laurens Storm van 's Gravesande, the governor of Essequibo. In 1750 he appointed his son Jonathan as Commander of Demerara.

Demerara grew rapidly, and attracted many English planters. The Dutch West India Company, who had a monopoly on the slave trade, was unable to supply them, leading to illegal smuggling from English colonies.

In 1755, Gedney Clarke, a Barbados merchant and plantation owner, requested political representation, therefore the administration was moved to the island of Borsselen, 20 miles (32 km) upriver near plantation Soesdyke which was owned by the commander of Demerara. The decision was criticised because the island was hard to defend, and the planters had started to build houses around the guard post near the mouth of the river. That settlement later became known as Stabroek, and in 1782 the capital of the colony. The town was renamed Georgetown in 1812.

In 1763, a slave uprising took place in neighbouring Berbice. Governor van 's Gravesande formed an alliance with the Amerindian Lokono, Kalina, Warao and Akawaio tribes, and prevented the uprising from spreading to Demerara and Essequibo. 50 soldiers from Demerara were sent to Berbice as assistance. The slave uprisings were a source of concern: in a 1767 letter to Frederick the Great, the King of Prussia, which aimed to promote the colony for German planters, a request was added for 100 soldiers.

In 1780, there were almost 200 plantations in Demerara compared to 129 in Essequibo. Demerara had become more successful than Essequibo. The rivalry between the colonies resulted in the creation of a combined Court of Policy in Fort Zeelandia. The majority of the white population of the colony were English and Scottish planters.

=== Conquest and reconquest ===
In 1781, the American Revolution War induced the Dutch Republic to join with the French Bourbon side against the British. A large fleet under Admiral Lord Rodney's command was sent to the West Indies, and after having made some seizures in the Caribbean Islands, a squadron was detached to take possession of the colonies of Essequibo and Demerara, which was accomplished without even a fight. In 1781, the annual production of the Essequibo and Demerara colonies was 10,000 okshoofden (2.3 megalitre) of sugar, 5 million ponden (2.5 gigagram) coffee, and 800,000 ponden (395 megagram) cotton.

In 1782 the French took possession of the whole of the Dutch settlements, compelling Gov. Robert Kingston to surrender. The opinion of the Dutch newspapers varied. The Leeuwarder Courant called it the loss of our Demerary, while the Hollandsche historische courant described it as a pleasant reconquest. The Treaty of Paris (1783) restored these territories to the Dutch.

The British recaptured Demerara, Essequibo, and Berbice in 1796. A deal was struck with the colony: all laws and customs could remain, and the citizens were equal to British subjects. Any government official who swore loyalty to the British crown could remain in function. They returned the colony to the Dutch in 1802 under the terms of the Peace of Amiens, but re-took control of it a year later.

On 28 April 1812, the British combined the colonies of Demerara and Essequibo into the colony of Demerara-Essequibo. They were ceded to Britain on 13 August 1814. On 20 November 1815, the Netherlands ratified the agreement.

=== Slave rebellion ===
Large slave rebellions broke out in West Demerara in 1795 and on the East Coast of Demerara in 1823. Although these rebellions were easily and bloodily crushed, according to Winston McGowan, they may have had a long-term impact in ending slavery:

The 1823 revolt had a special significance not matched by the earlier Berbice uprising. It attracted attention in Britain inside and outside Parliament to the terrible evil of slavery and the need to abolish it. This played a part, along with other humanitarian, political and economic factors, in causing the British parliament ten years later in 1833 to take the momentous decision to abolish slavery in British Guiana and elsewhere in the British Empire with effect from 1 August 1834. After serving four years of a modified form of slavery euphemistically called apprenticeship, the slaves were finally freed on 1 August 1838.

—

=== Dissolution ===
On 21 July 1831, Demerara-Essequibo united with Berbice as British Guiana, now Guyana. In 1838, Demerara was made one of the three counties of Guiana, the other two being Berbice and Essequibo. In 1958, the county was abolished when Guiana was subdivided into districts. Historical Demerara was divided in 1958 and are a part of Guyanese administrative regions of Demerara-Mahaica, Essequibo Islands-West Demerara, and Upper Demerara-Berbice.

== Notable Demerarans ==
- Sir James Douglas (1803–1877), Governor of the Colony of Vancouver Island (1851–64) and the Colony of British Columbia (1858–64).
- Rev. Joseph Ketley (1802–1875), Congregational missionary, mid 19th century.
- John Edmonstone (late 18th century–mid 19th century), a freed slave who taught Charles Darwin taxidermy.
- Andrew Watson (1856-1921), first black person to play association football at international level.

=== Commanders of Demerara ===
- Jonathan Samuel Storm van 's Gravesande (†1761) (1750–1761)
- Laurens Lodewijk van Bercheijk (†1765) (1761–1765)
- Jan Cornelis van den Heuvel (1765–1770)
- Paulus van Schuylenburgh (1772–1781)
- Antony Beaujon (22 April 1796 – 27 March 1802)

=== Governors of Demerara ===
- Robert Kingston (27 February 1781 – 1782)
- Louis Antoine Dazemard de Lusignan (1782)
- Armand Guy Simon de Coëtnempren, comte de Kersaint (*1742 – †1793) (1782)
- Georges Manganon de la Perrière (1783–1784)

=== Directors-general ===
- Laurens Storm van 's Gravesande (1752–1772)
- Joseph Bourda (acting) (6 March 1784 – February 1785)
- Jan L'Éspinasse (February 1785 – 18 August 1789)
- Albertus Backer (18 August 1789 – 31 March 1793)
- Baron Willem August Sirtema van Grovestins (31 March 1793 – May 1795)
- Antony Beaujon (May 1795 – 22 April 1796)
- Antony Meertens (27 March 1802 – September 1803)

=== Lieutenant governors of Demerara and Essequibo ===
- Robert Nicholson (September 1803 – 18 August 1804)
- Antony Beaujon (18 August 1804 – 17 October 1805)
- James Montgomery (acting) (19 October 1805 – 8 May 1806)
- Henry William Bentinck (*1765 – †1821) (8 May 1806 – February 1812)
- Hugh Lyle Carmichael (*1764 – †1813) (February 1812 – 11 May 1813)
- E. Codd (acting) (11 May 1813 – 23 May 1813)
- John Murray (23 May 1813 – 26 April 1824)
- Sir Benjamin d'Urban (26 April 1824 – 21 July 1831)

=== Leaders of rebellions ===
- 1823: Jack Gladstone of Plantation Success
- 1823: Quamina of Plantation Success

== See also ==
- History of Guyana
- Banknotes of Demerary and Essequibo
- Pierre Louis de Saffon

== Sources ==
- Dalton, Henry G (1855). The History of British Guiana: Comprising a General Description of the Colony: A narrative of some of the principal events from the earliest period of products and natural history. London: Longman, Brown, Green, and Longmans.
- Edler, F. (2001) [1911], The Dutch Republic and The American Revolution, Honolulu, Hawaii: University Press of the Pacific, ISBN 0-89875-269-8
- Hadden, James (2009). Hadden's Journal and Orderly Books. Applewood. ISBN 978-1-4290-1685-8.
- Hartsinck, J.J. (1770), Beschryving van Guiana, of de wilde kust in Zuid-America, Amsterdam: Gerrit Tielenburg
- Netscher, Pieter Marinus (1888). Geschiedenis van de koloniën Essequebo, Demerary en Berbice, van de vestiging der Nederlanders aldaar tot op onzen tijd (in Dutch). The Hague: Martinus Nijhoff.
- Schomburgk, Sir Robert H. (1840). A Description of British Guiana, Geographical and Statistical: Exhibiting Its Resources and Capabilities. London: Simpkin, Marshall and Co. ISBN 978-0714619491.
- Storm van 's Gravesande, Laurens; Villiers, J.A.J. de (1920). Storm van 's Gravesande: zijn werk en zijn leven uit zijne brieven opgebouwd (in Dutch). The Hague: Nijhoff.
