= Laurens Storm van 's Gravesande =

Dutch governor of the colonies of Essequibo and Demerara (1704-1775)

Director General of Essequibo and Demerara
- In office 1752 – 27 November 1772
- Succeeded by: George Hendrik Trotz

Commander of Essequibo
- In office 13 April 1743 – 1750
- Preceded by: Hermanus Gelskerke
- Succeeded by: Adriaan Spoors (interim)

Personal details
- Born: Laurens Storm van 's Gravesande; 12 October 1704 's-Hertogenbosch, Dutch Republic (now Netherlands)
- Died: 14 August 1775 (aged 70) Soesdyke, Demerara
- Spouse: Lumea Constantia van Bercheyck
- Children: Jonathan Storm van 's Gravesande
- Relatives: Jan Cornelis Van den Heuvel (son-in-law)
- Occupation: governor

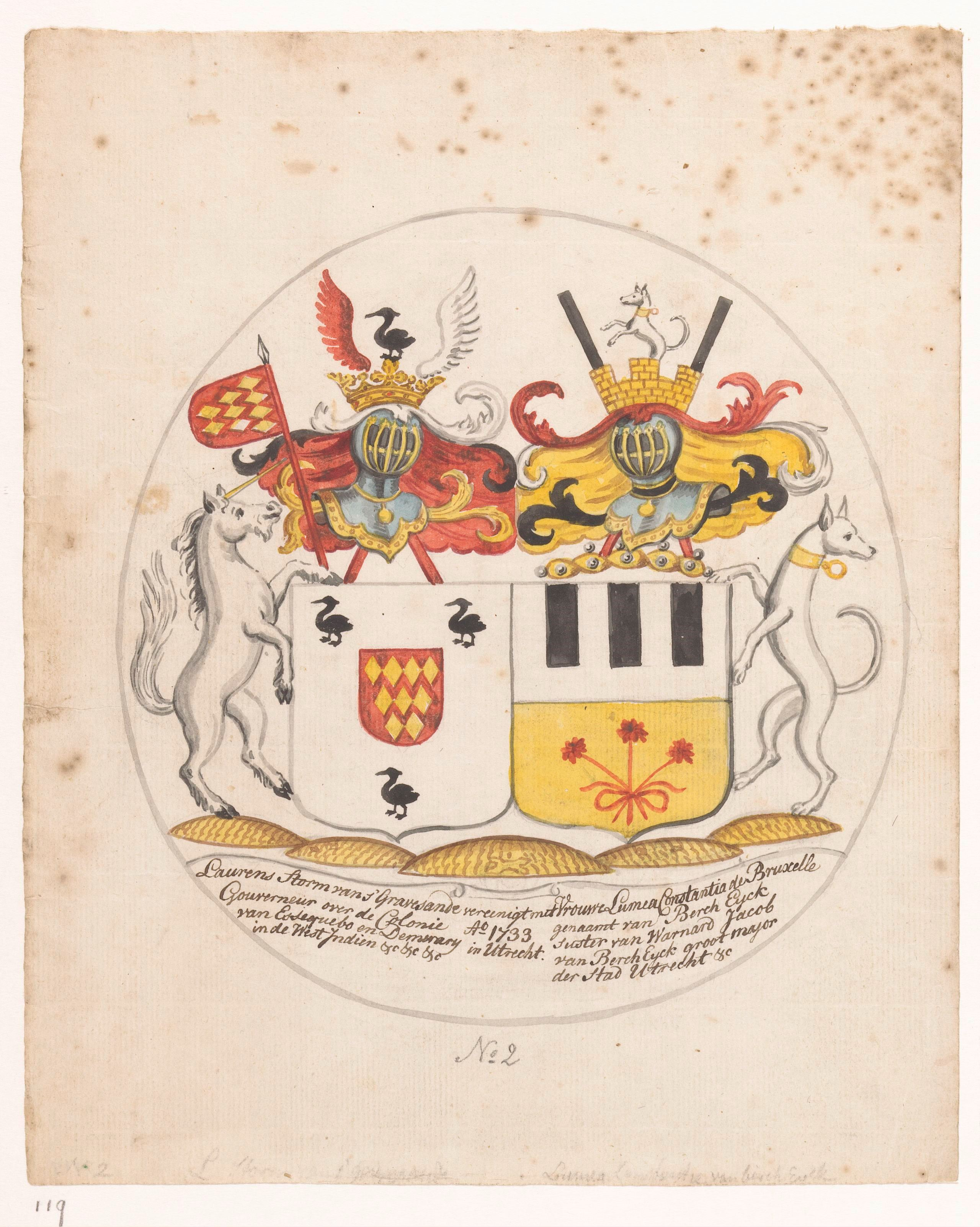
Arms of alliance of Storm van 's Gravesande (left) and his wife Lumea van Bercheyck (right)

Laurens Storm van 's Gravesande (12 October 1704 – 14 August 1775) was a Dutch governor of the colonies of Essequibo and Demerara from 1743 to 1772. He turned Demerara in a successful plantation colony, and the borders of Guyana are mainly based on his expeditions into the interior. He is also noted for his treatment of the Amerindians.

== Biography ==
Laurens Storm van 's Gravesande was born in 's-Hertogenbosch in a patrician family who were hereditary members of the Council of Delft since 1270. At the age of 17, he joined the army. In October 1737, he started to work for the Dutch West India Company (WIC), the governing authority of the western colonies, and was assigned to Fort Zeelandia in Essequibo as a secretary. In 1738, he established the College of Kiezers, an electoral college for the colony. After the death of Hermanus Gelskerke, the Commander of Essequibo, Storm van 's Gravesande was appointed Commander of the colony on 13 April 1743.

In 1745, Demerara was created as a separate colony, even though it was located on an unoccupied part of Essequibo, because the people from the province of Holland wanted to settle there and Essequibo was part of Zeeland. Demerara was initially governed from Essequibo. In 1750 he appointed his son Jonathan as Commander of Demerara. After a conflict with the WIC, he left for the Netherlands, but was reappointed as Director General of Essequibo and Demerara in 1752.

In Demerara he instituted an open-door policy. He befriended Gedney Clarke, a Barbados merchant and plantation owner who owned many plantations and had many contacts. In 1755, Clarke requested political representation, therefore as separate administration for Demerara was established of the island of Borsselen. The colony of Demerara started to flourish. In 1763, a slave uprising took place in neighbouring Berbice. Governor van 's Gravesande formed an alliance with the Amerindian tribes and prevented the uprising from spreading to his colonies.

In 1763, he asked to be replaced, and repeated the request in 1766 and 1770, until he was finally replaced on 27 November 1772. On 14 August 1775, Laurens Storm van 's Gravesande died on his plantation Soesdyke.

== Legacy ==
Storm van 's Gravesande started to focus on the economic development of the plantations instead of trade. Another focus was on exploration projects in the interior and setting up trade posts with the Amerindian. The current borders of Guyana as defined by Robert Hermann Schomburgk were mainly based on the reports of the explorations carried out during this period. Storm van 's Gravesande started an Amerindian policy based on respect and friendly relations, and forging alliances with the tribes during times of crisis. His open door policy resulted a majority of English and Scottish planters among the white population.

Historians have often praised his rule of the colonies; however, his reign was also marked by nepotism by appointing sons and sons-in-laws in important positions. His treatment of the Amerindians contrasted with the slaves. A telling anecdote is that on 9 August 1767, 20 slaves of his plantation Soesdyke made a failed attempt at escape. In his letters he wrote that he could not understand it, because they were well fed, and only punished for good reason.

== Bibliography ==
- Hartsinck, J.J. (1770). Beschryving van Guiana, of de wilde kust in Zuid-America (in Dutch). Amsterdam: Gerrit Tielenburg.
- Storm van 's Gravesande, Laurens; Villiers, J.A.J. de (1920). Storm van 's Gravesande: zijn werk en zijn leven uit zijne brieven opgebouwd (in Dutch). The Hague: Nijhoff.
- Storm van 's Gravesande, Laurens; Villiers, J.A.J. de; Harris, C.A. (1911). The rise of British Guiana: compiled from his despatches. London: Hakluyt Society. ISBN 9781317049746.
