= Soesdyke =

- Village
- Location in Guyana
- Coordinates: 6.5457600°N 58.23593°W
- Country: Guyana
- Region: Demerara-Mahaica

Population (2012)
  - Total: 4,114
- Time zone: UTC-4
- Climate: Af

Soesdyke is a village in the Demerara-Mahaica Region (Region 4), Guyana, located between the Demerara River and the East Bank Public Road. It is about 7.8km (4.8 miles) miles northeast of the Cheddi Jagan International Airport.

The village started as the plantation Soesdyke which was owned by Laurens Storm van 's Gravesande, the governor of Essequibo and Demerara. Van Gravesande, moved the government of the colony to the nearby island of Borsselen (also Borslem) in the Demerara River.

== Population and Economy ==
In 2012, the official census recorded a population of 156 people in Soesdyke. Residents are predominantly of East Indian descent. The main religion in Soesdyke is Hinduism, with a small number of peoples adhering to Muslim or Christian faiths. The main economic activities in the region are agriculture, hunting and forestry.

== Notable people ==
- Fred Abraham (1886–1918), cricket player
