= Fred Abraham Jr. =

British Guiana cricketer

Fred Abraham
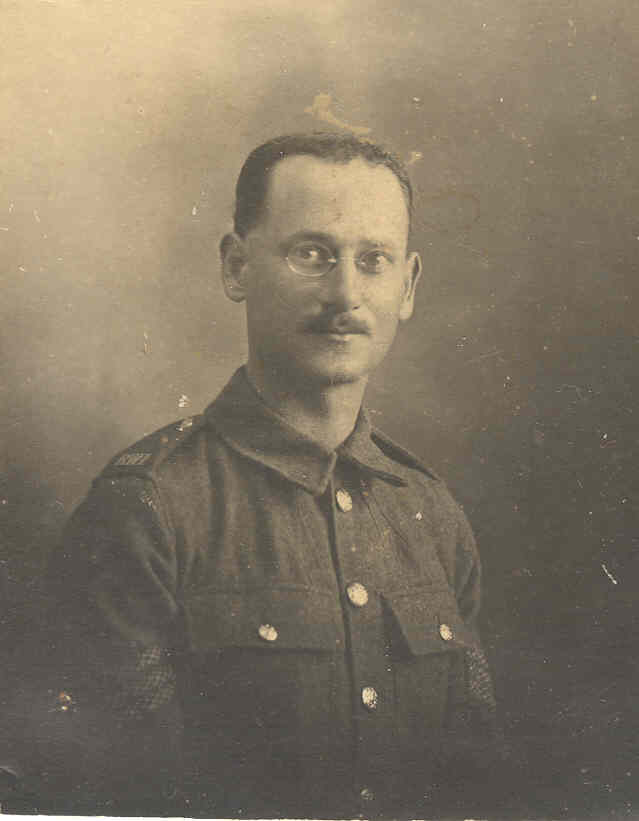

Personal information
- Full name: Frederick Henri Abraham
- Born: 4 July 1886; Soesdyke, Demerara, British Guiana
- Died: 2 October 1918 (aged 32); Joncourt, Aisne, France
- Batting: Right-handed
- Bowling: Right-arm medium
- Role: All-rounder
- Relatives: Fred Abraham Sr. (father)

Domestic team information
- Years: Team
- 1904–1912: British Guiana

Career statistics
Competition	FC
Matches	10
Runs scored	362
Batting average	20.11
100s/50s	0/2
Top score	64
Balls bowled	1,148
Wickets	24
Bowling average	24.37
5 wickets in innings	0
10 wickets in match	0
Best bowling	4/30
Catches/stumpings	9/–
- Source: CricketArchive, 30 November 2014

Frederick Henri "Fred" Abraham (4 July 1886 – 2 October 1918) was a British Guianese cricketer who played at first-class level for what is now the Guyanese national side (then known as British Guiana). He was killed fighting in France during the First World War.

Abraham was born at Soesdyke, on the eastern bank of the Demerara River in present-day Guyana. His Essequibo-born father, Fred Abraham Sr., played a single match for British Guiana in September 1883. Abraham himself made his first-class debut during the 1904–05 season, aged 18, when he played for British Guiana against a touring English side led by Lord Brackley (later the 4th Earl of Ellesmere). He participated in Inter-Colonial Tournament matches over the following six seasons, although British Guiana failed to make the tournament's final in any of those years. Abraham often opened the bowling for British Guiana, and later came to open the batting, despite having come in seventh in the batting order on debut. He twice scored half-centuries while opening the batting – 56 runs against Trinidad in September 1907, and 64 against Barbados in January 1909.

Outside of intercolonial matches, Abraham played three matches for British Guiana against touring sides – two during the 1909–10 season, against a team of West Indians led by William Shepherd, and one during the 1910–11 season, against a team of English players organised by the MCC and led by A. W. F. Somerset. Abraham's best bowling figures came during his final first-class match, against Trinidad in the 1911–12 Inter-Colonial Tournament hosted by Barbados. He took 4/30 from fourteen six-ball overs in Trinidad's innings, but was unable to prevent his side from losing by an innings and 36 runs. During World War I, Abraham enlisted as an officer cadet with the 16th Battalion of the Lancashire Fusiliers, having previously been a serjeant in the West India Regiment (drawn from the British colonies in the Caribbean). By September 1917, he had been promoted temporary second lieutenant, along with 23 other cadets from his regiment. Abraham was killed in action at Goncourt, France, in early October 1918, and buried at Joncourt East British Cemetery, where his gravestone inscription reads: "MORE THAN LIFE NO MAN CAN GIVE".

== See also ==
- List of cricketers who were killed during military service
