= Karen de Souza =

Guyanese women and child's rights activist

- Born: Karen Audrey de Souza; 19 January 1958 (age 68); Georgetown, British Guiana
- Occupations: Women's and children's activist
- Years active: 1986–present
- Known for: Co-founder of Red Thread

Karen de Souza (born 19 January 1958) is a Guyanese women and child's rights activist who has worked to advocate for victims, educate and provide support for victims of violence. Founder of the NGO Red Thread anti-violence campaigns, she has been involved in training programmes of judicial officers and contributed to the drafting law to protect trafficking and anti-violence. Her advocacy has been recognized by both regional and international organizations.

== Early life ==
Karen Audrey de Souza was born on 19 January 1958 in Georgetown, the capital city of British Guiana, to Mary-Anne and Dennis Adrian de Souza. Her mother maintained the home and worked as needed as a seamstress or examination invigilator. Her father was a wharf supervisor. De Souza identifies as Afro-Guyanese, though her heritage includes Amerindian, Chinese, Dutch, East Indian, Portuguese, and Scottish ancestry, as well. Much of her childhood was spent on Leguan Island. After completing her primary schooling in 1968, de Souza was awarded a scholarship to attend Bishops' High School in Georgetown, graduating in 1974.

== Career ==
De Souza began her career in the offices of then Prime Minister Forbes Burnham, as a library assistant in 1974. The following year, she began working as a volunteer in the Guyana National Service (GNS), an organization that provided basic training and skills for unemployed youth. She learned electrical skills in the service and gave reading courses to illiterates. She pursued studies at the University of Guyana between 1976 and 1977 while continuing her employment in the library, and became active in promoting the film The Terror and the Time, a documentary on British colonialism. She distributed political flyers, which resulted in a reprimand from her employer. In 1979, after an investigation into whether Working People's Alliance members had involvement with a recent arson, her home was searched and she was charged with larceny for some material found concerning the GNS. De Souza had not previously been involved with the Alliance, but after her detainment, she joined the group, identified as a Marxist and became a political activist.

Graduating with her bachelor of arts degree in 1980, de Souza continued her political activities, working in opposition to the government of her employer. Though the larceny charge was dismissed in 1985, after a lengthy battle to clear her name, she was fired from her job and became a full-time activist. As her employment opportunities had been limited by the accusations and subsequent arrests, at times, she had to rely on family for support. The following year, she and other women involved with the Working People's Alliance (WPA) co-founded Red Thread, as a grass-roots activist organization to assist rural communities and women in the Afro-Guyanese, Amerindian and Indo-Guyanese populations. Initially their efforts focused on education and political rights, but in 1993, de Souza disaffiliated with the WPA, becoming a full-time coordinator for Red Thread.

De Souza has done research on prostitution and sex work in Guyana, as well as participated in conferences on critical geography to evaluate how location intersects with socio-political factors, such as class, ethnicity, gender, nationality, race and sexuality. She has led Red Thread's focus away from political power and toward self-advocacy. De Souza was the driving force behind the creation of a domestic violence survivors' group for women to tell their experiences, help each other and learn from one another. Since 2000, her efforts have focused on poverty, children's rights, and domestic violence. To assist women's comprehension of their protections under the law, she rewrote the Domestic Violence Act into a booklet in language that is easily understood. She coordinates efforts with the judiciary and the Guyana Police Force to educate and understand the complex issues surrounding domestic violence, building bridges for quick action when situations arise.

De Souza was Guyana's nominee for the International Women of Courage Award in 2012. In 2014, de Souza was awarded the Anthony N Sabga Caribbean Award for Excellence in the field of community service.
