= Fred Abraham Sr. =

British Guianese cricketer

Fred Abraham
Personal information
- Full name: (Frank?) Frederick Abraham
- Born: 9 January 1859; Adventure Village, Essequibo, British Guiana
- Died: 12 July 1901 (aged 42), or 14 May 1918 (aged 59); British Guiana
- Relatives: Fred Abraham Jr. (son)

Domestic team information
- Years: Team
- 1883: Demerara (British Guiana)

Career statistics
Competition	FC
Matches	1
Runs scored	6
Batting average	6.00
100s/50s	0/0
Top score	6
Catches/stumpings	0/–
- Source: CricketArchive, 30 November 2014

Frederick "Fred" Abraham (or Frank Frederick Abraham; 9 January 1859 – 12 July 1901 or 14 May 1918) was a British Guianese cricketer who played a single first-class match for Demerara, an antecedent of the current Guyanese national side.

Abraham, who was born at Adventure Village near the mouth of the Essequibo River, played for Demerara in an intercolonial match against Barbados in September 1883. The game was played at the Bay Pasture ground in the capital of the Colony of Barbados, Bridgetown. In his only recorded match, he scored six runs batting fifth in Demerara's first innings, before being caught by William Howell off the bowling of Alfred Browne. Demerara were bowled out for 76, but went on to bowl out Barbados for 66 in their first innings. After batting, Abraham was unable to take part in the remainder of the match, with Alfred Swain substituting for him. Demerara made 94 in their second innings, and Barbados easily chased down their target, winning the match by six wickets.

Abraham died in British Guiana decades later, although his year of death is disputed, with one source giving a July 1901 date and another giving a May 1918 date. His son, Frederick Henri Abraham Jr., also played cricket for British Guiana, but was killed in France in October 1918, having fought with the Lancashire Fusiliers.
