= Demerara-Essequibo =

Former British colony in South America

Coordinates: 6.8121°N 58.1701°W

Colony of Demerara-Essequibo
- 1812–1831
- Flag

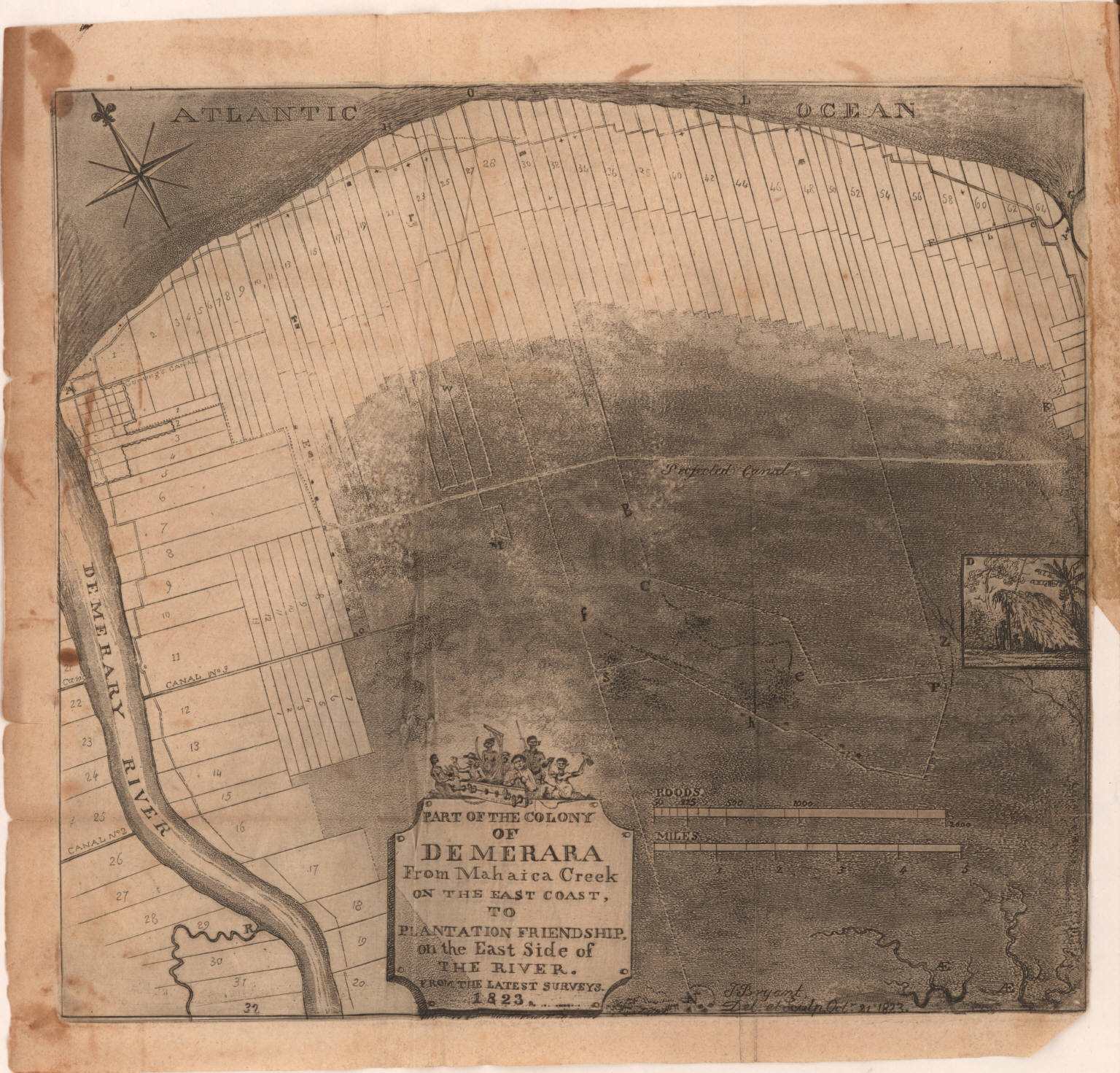
- Map of Demerara-Essequibo following the slave rebellion in 1823, showing the disposition of plantations, Small crosses mark the places where slaves' heads or bodies were displayed
- Status: De facto Colony of the United Kingdom (1812–1815); Colony of the United Kingdom (1815–1831)
- Common languages: Dutch, Skepi Creole Dutch, English, Guyanese Creole, African languages, Akawaio, Macushi, Waiwai, Arawakan, Patamona, Warrau, Carib, Wapishana, Arekuna, Portuguese, Spanish, French
- Monarch
  - 1812–1820: George III
  - 1820–1830: George IV
  - 1830–1831: William IV
- Lieutenant Governor
  - 1814–1824: John Murray
  - 1824–1831: Sir Benjamin d'Urban
- History
  - Established: 1812
  - Disestablished: 1831
- Currency: British variety of the Dutch guilder
Preceded by	Succeeded by
Essequibo (colony); Demerara	British Guiana

The Colony of Demerara-Essequibo was created on 28 April 1812, when the British combined the colonies of Demerara and Essequibo into the colony of Demerara-Essequibo. They were officially ceded to Britain on 13 August 1814. On 20 November 1815, the agreement was ratified by the Netherlands. On 21 July 1831, Demerara-Esequibo united with Berbice as British Guiana.

== Overview ==
In 1745, Demerara was created as a separate Dutch colony out of a part of Essequibo. Demerara quickly became more successful than Essequibo. The rivalry between the colonies resulted in the creation of a combined Court of Policy in Fort Zeelandia in 1783, and both colonies were governed by the same governor; however, there were still two Courts of Justice, one for Demerara and one for Essequibo. On 28 April 1812, the two colonies were officially combined, however 1815 is used as end date, because the ratification eliminated the last legal obstacles.

On 18 August 1823, there was a slave rebellion involving more than 10,000 slaves, which resulted in the deaths of hundreds of slaves.

On 21 July 1831, Demerara-Esequibo united with Berbice as British Guiana.

== Currency ==
The colony continued to use Dutch guilder as currency throughout British control, with issued coins ranging from 3 bits up to 3 guilder. Coins bearing the colony's name were minted from 1809 to 1835. The Dutch guilder was demonetised after unification, and in 1839 was replaced with the British Guiana dollar.

== Administrators ==
=== Lieutenant Governors ===
- John Murray (1814–1824)
- Sir Benjamin d'Urban (1824–1831)

== See also ==
- Demerara rebellion of 1823

== Bibliography ==
- Hartsinck, J.J. (1770), Beschryving van Guiana, of de wilde kust in Zuid-America, Amsterdam: Gerrit Tielenburg
- Netscher, Pieter Marinus (1888). Geschiedenis van de koloniën Essequebo, Demerary en Berbice, van de vestiging der Nederlanders aldaar tot op onzen tijd (in Dutch). The Hague: Martinus Nijhoff.
- Schomburgk, Sir Robert H. (1840). A Description of British Guiana, Geographical and Statistical: Exhibiting Its Resources and Capabilities. London: Simpkin, Marshall and Co. ISBN 978-0714619491.
