= Guyana Girl Guides Association =

- Guyana Girl Guides Association
- Headquarters: 106 Brickdam, Stabroek
- Location: Georgetown
- Country: Guyana
- Founded: 1922
- Membership: 3,971 (2018)
- Chief Commissioner: Schemel Patrick
- Patron: Sandra Granger
- Affiliation: World Association of Girl Guides and Girl Scouts

The Guyana Girl Guides Association (GGGA) is the national Guiding organization of Guyana. It serves 3,971 members (as of 2018). Founded in 1922, the girls-only organization became a full member of the World Association of Girl Guides and Girl Scouts in 1975.

Guiding started in 1922 in Berbice, and it became an officially registered branch association of the Guide Association in the United Kingdom in 1924. It became an associate member of the World Association of Girl Guides and Girl Scouts in 1969 and a full member in 1975. It is the country's oldest association dedicated to the social development and wellness of girls and young women.

In 2019, first lady Sandra Granger was the patron of the Guyana Girl Guides Association. In 2024, the Association celebrated its 100th anniversary, and Mignon Bowen-Phillips gave a speech praising the Association for its efforts to support girls in developing life skills and leadership abilities.

== Program ==
The association is divided in four sections according to age:

- Sunflowers - ages 3 to 7
- Brownie Guide - ages 7 to 11
- Girl Guide - ages 11 to 15
- Ranger Guide - ages 15 to 19

== Structure ==
Units are usually affiliated with a school, including Leeds Primary, Rose Hall Estate Primary, St. Aloysius Primary, Tagore Memorial, All Saints Primary, East Canje Secondary, Buxton, Ann's Grove, Plaisance, Tutorial, Pavilion, Sophia and West Demerara, St Paul’s Plaisance, and Bishops' High School.

The local units are grouped in divisions, such as the regional division of the "East Coast of Demerara".

GGGA is a member of the Caribbean Link for Guiding within the Western Hemisphere Region of the World Association of Girl Guides and Girl Scouts.

== Activities ==
Their yearly event World Thinking Day on February 22 "is a day of international friendship, speaking out on issues that affect girls and young women, and fundraising for 10 million Girl Guides and Girl Scouts around the world."

One service activity performed by Guides has been promoting local agricultural development, such as beekeeping, poultry farming, and food preservation. The Association has also focused on funding and supporting girls' education and in recent years has aimed to increase activities in rural areas.

== See also ==
- The Scout Association of Guyana
