= The Scout Association of Guyana =

- Headquarters: Woolford Avenue, Thomas Lands, Georgetown
- Location: Woolford Avenue, Thomas Lands, Georgetown
- Country: Guyana
- Founder: The Scout Association of the United Kingdom
- Chief Scout: Ramsay Alli
- Website "The Scout Association of Guyana". 3 October 2008. Archived from the original on 3 October 2008.

The Scout Association of Guyana is the national Scouting organization of Guyana. It was established in 1967 as the successor to the British Guiana branch of the Scout Association of the United Kingdom. The association became a member of the World Organization of the Scout Movement in the same year. As of 2008, it had 424 registered members.

== History ==
There is a record of Scout Troops in British Guyana in 1909. Later, some Scout Troops registered with the Boy Scouts Association of the United Kingdom, which established a branch in British Guiana. The Boy Scouts Association appointed a District Commissioner, a District Committee, and its executive committee. In 1920, these became the Colony Commissioner, Colony Boy Scout Council, and its executive committee. The Boy Scouts Association's British Guyana branch changed its name to The Scout Association of Guyana, which joined the World Organization of the Scout Movement in 1967.

=== Early troops ===
Scouting was introduced to British Guiana in 1909, making Guyana the first Caribbean country to start scouting and fifth in the world. The first Scout Troop was formed at Queen's College under the leadership of George Manly, a Sergeant Major in the British Regiment stationed there. New troops formed and were attached mainly to church schools including St. Mary’s, St. Theresa’s, St. Stanislaus, St. Francis, St. Thomas More, HQ Troop 39, St. Pius, and Central High in Georgetown.

Another prominent troop was St. Stanislaus College Troop 25, established in 1911, which catered for Roman Catholic boys before the school became co-educational. Among its leaders was Father Bernard Darke, S.J., who had been trained as a Scout Leader at Gilwell, England. He was on Guyana's Scout Executive Committee and was a member of the Leader Training Team.

=== Further history ===
The first Jamboree Camp in British Guiana was held in 1912.

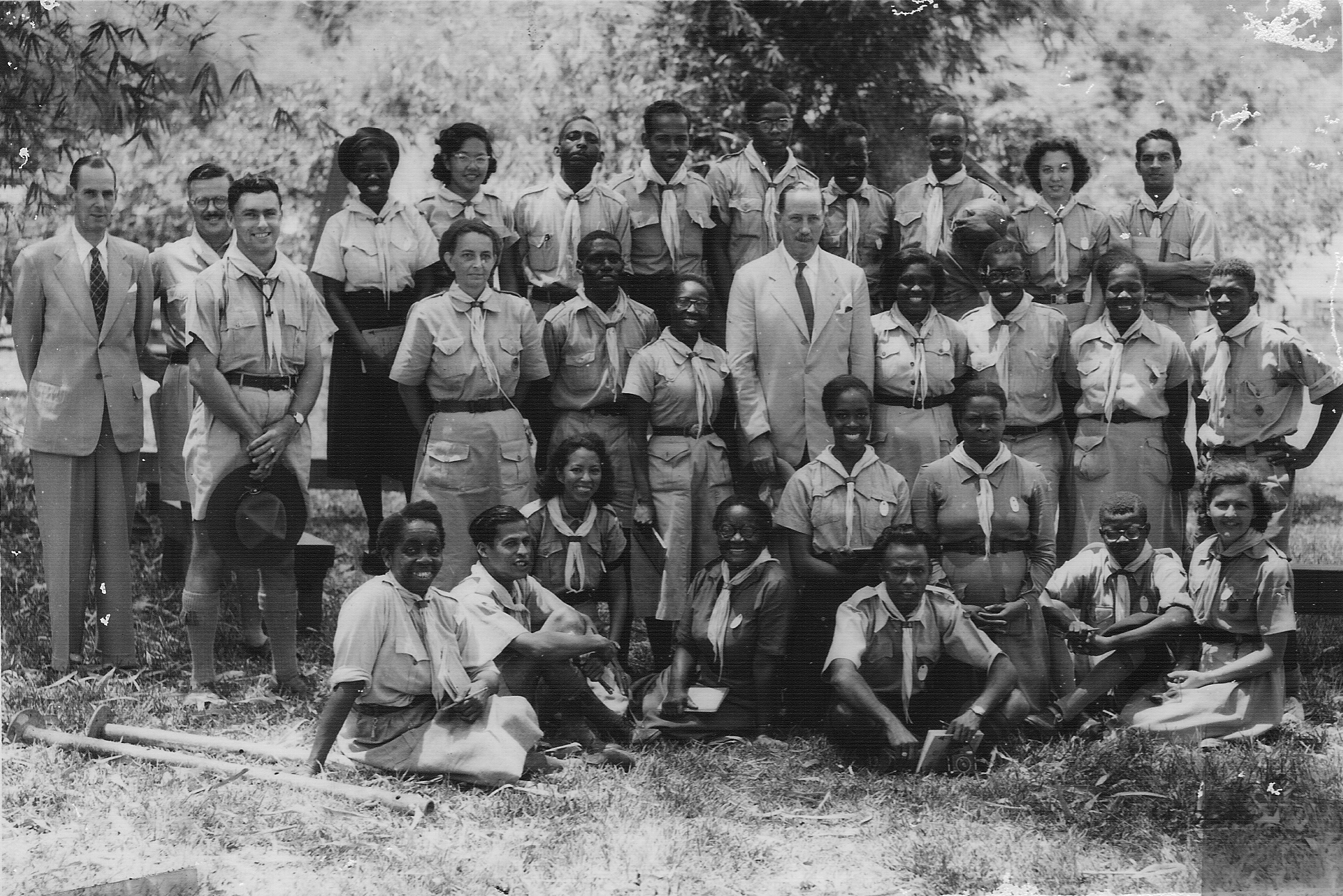
BG Scout Leaders 1954

The 2019 National Camp of the Scouts Association of Guyana marked the 110th anniversary of scouting in Guyana. The headquarters is located at Woolford Avenue.

== Training ==
To obtain the highest rank, a Scout must pass the normal proficiency tests and, in addition, must be able to obtain badges in agriculture, which prepares each Scout to feed himself off his own produce.

== Presidents ==
- Justice E. Hewick (1910)
- Hon Geo. Garnett, CMG (1911)
- Sir Alfred P Sherlock (1913)
- Colonel WE Clarke (1918)
- Colonel Cecil May (1919)
- Colonel FH Blackwood, DSO (1925)
- Hon Hector Josephs, KC (1926)
- Admiral FC Fisher (1929)
- Rev Canon JT Robert, REA (1930)
- Prof J Sydney Dash (1937)
- LG Crease (1942)
- Capt H Nobbs, OBE (1950)

== Commissioners ==
Early Commissioners were referred to as District Commissioners. In 1920 their title was changed to Colony Commissioner. Commissioners have included:

- Capt LD Cleare (1913)
- HW Sconce (1919)
- Major William Bain-Gray (Director of Education) (1925)
- Rev C Norman (1926)
- Hon C Douglas-Jones, CMG (Colonial Secretary) (1929)
- Capt R Patrick (Director of Education Acting) (1929)
- Capt F Burnett (1930)
- JD Gillespie (1931)
- Fred T Weston (1941)
- John R Durey, MBE (Awarded Silver Acorn) (1942)
- DB St Aubyn, MBE (1952)

== Census ==
- 1987: 341 Scouts, 125 Cubs and 49 Leaders
- 2001: 399 members
- 2008: 424 members

== See also ==
- Guyana Girl Guides Association
