= Jack Gladstone =

Leader of the Demerara Rebellion of 1823

Jack Gladstone was an enslaved Guianese man who led the Demerara rebellion of 1823, one of the large slave rebellions in the British Empire. He was captured and tried after the rebellion, and deported.

== Biography ==
Jack and his father, Quamina, an African-born enslaved carpenter, lived and worked on the "Success" plantation in Demerara. He is surnamed Gladstone after the owner of the plantation, as the enslaved adopted surnames of their masters by convention. Sir John Gladstone, the father of future British Prime Minister William Ewart Gladstone, had never set foot on his plantation. He had acquired a half share in it in 1812 through mortgage default and acquired the remaining half four years later. Until 1828, the estate was entrusted to Frederick Cort, who was fired for being "an idler and a deceiver" who had mismanaged one estate after another.

Jack was a cooper on the plantation. As a slave who did not work under a driver, he enjoyed considerable freedom to roam about. He was a free spirit, and passionate man who despised limitations on his freedom; he was aware of the debate about slavery in Britain, and was made extremely listless by rumours of emancipation papers arriving from London. Jack was tall and debonair, and possessed "European features" — he stood at six feet two inches, was intelligent, and had a reputation as a "wild fellow". Jack had been baptised, was occasionally a "teacher", but was not a regular churchgoer because he was too restless to follow church rules. He had taken Susanna, a slave on "Le Resouvenir" who was on Rev. Smith's congregation, to his wife. However, in April 1812, Quamina had found out that she had become the mistress of John Hamilton, the manager at 'Le Resouvenir'. Rev. Smith reacted angrily, and she was expelled her from the flock by unanimous vote when she had refused to terminate the relationship. When Susanna left, Jack married a slave on Chateau Margo plantation, but would continue to have relations with several other women on the same plantation, to the disdain of both the owner of Margo and the manager at Success.

Da Costa puts Jack's age at around 30 at the time of the rebellion. Following the arrival of news from Britain that measures aimed at improving the treatment of slaves in the colonies had been passed, Jack had heard a rumour that their masters had received instructions to set them free but were refusing to do so. He wrote a letter (signing his father's name) to the members of the chapel informing them of the "new law". Meanwhile, his father Quamina supported the idea of a peaceful strike, and made the fellow slaves promise not to use violence. Jack led tens of thousands of slaves to raise up against their masters. The very low number of white deaths is proof that the uprising was largely peaceful – Plantation owners, managers and their families were locked up and not harmed. After the slaves' defeat in a major battle at "Bachelor's Adventure", Jack fled into the woods. A "handsome reward" of one thousand guilder was offered for his capture. Jack and Quamina remained at large until Jack and his wife were captured by Capt. McTurk at "Chateau Margo". Leading up to it, McTurk had received information on 6 September from a slave about Jack's whereabouts; there was a three-hour standoff. Quamina evaded capture for several days longer. At its end, and the slaves' defeat, hundreds of slaves were executed as ringleaders, including Quamina.

After the rebellion, those identified as ringleaders were tried hastily by the British and most were sentenced to death. Since Jack was regarded as the leader of leaders, his trial was unusually elaborate, lasting several days and including testimony from both Europeans and slaves. His sentence was death but Governor Murray requested clemency for Jack (and fourteen other slaves) on the grounds that during the rebellion he had repeatedly protected white captives from being abused or killed by the rebel slaves. The King granted clemency and Jack Gladstone was banished to Saint Lucia. His legacy was to help bring attention to the plight of sugar plantation slaves, accelerating the abolition of slavery.

== See also ==
- Abolition of slavery timeline
- Slavery in the British and French Caribbean
- Nat Turner
- Bussa
- Denmark Vesey
- Toussaint Louverture
- Vincent Ogé
- Samuel Sharpe
- List of opponents of slavery
- List of slaves
