= John Murray (colonial administrator) =

Canadian politician

General John Murray
- Born: 1739 Ireland
- Died: May 4, 1824 (aged 84–85) Paris, France

General John Murray (c. 1739 – 4 May 1824) was an Irish-born British Army officer and colonial administrator in British North America and South America. Murray joined the British Army in 1760 and rose to the rank of brigadier general in 1796. He was also an administrator of Cape Breton from 1799 to 1801.

Murray is notable in that during his short period as administrator, he made important improvements of roads and coal mining operations among other things.

He died in Paris in 1824.

His eldest son, Lieutenant General John Murray, was Governor of Demerara from 1813 to 1814 and then for Demerara-Essequibo from 1814 to 1824. His second son, Freeman Murray, was Governor of Bermuda.

Political offices
Preceded by James Ogilvie	Administrator of Cape Breton Island; 1799-1801; Served under: William Macarmick	Succeeded by John Despard
