= Nickerie =

Nickerie may refer to one of the following locations in Suriname:

- Nickerie District
- Nickerie River
- Nieuw Nickerie, the capital of Nickerie District
