= Winnie Haatrecht =

Dutch-Surinamese footballer

Winston Haatrecht
Personal information
- Full name: Winnie Haatrecht
- Date of birth: 5 November 1963 (age 62)
- Place of birth: Paramaribo, Suriname
- Position: Central defender

Youth career
- Argonaut
- Ajax

Senior career*
Years	Team	Apps	(Gls)
1983–1984	Ajax	4	(0)
1984–1985	Willem II	34	(4)
1986	AZ '67	11	(0)
1988–1989	Heerenveen	31	(2)
1990–1992	La Chaux-de-Fonds	23	(5)
1992–1994	Cambuur	51	(4)
1994–1995	TOP Oss	32	(5)
- * Club domestic league appearances and goals

Winston ("Winnie") Haatrecht is a Dutch-Surinamese retired footballer and currently a player's agent. During his playing career he served as a defender for AFC Ajax, Willem II Tilburg, AZ, SC Heerenveen, FC La Chaux-de-Fonds, Cambuur Leeuwarden and TOP Oss. He is the brother of deceased footballer Jerry Haatrecht.

== Career ==
Raised in Amsterdam's Kinkerbuurt and playing for local amateur side Argonaut, Jerry and Winnie were not able to get a professional contract at Ajax and both left the club for a club in other regions of the Netherlands. Winnie signed for Willem II Tilburg, while Jerry moved to Cambuur Leeuwarden. Where Jerry's adventure was no success, as his mentality and his discipline were not strong enough to eventually break through in professional football, Winnie made his professional debut at Willem II, but in his second match he injured his meniscus, which took him nine weeks to at least be able to walk again. After he recovered he would no longer be the highly talented player he was, but became a decent professional player instead. Willem II played a great first half of the season in which they won almost all matches. However, in the second half things went worse and their coach asked his players what was going on. When Haatrecht was one of the few to actually answer the question he was not supported by his teammates nor the coach and he did no longer feel happy at Willem II. He had a few friends playing at AZ and asked if it was possible to join that club to play alongside his buddy Sigi Lens.

He was already able to join AZ in the winter break of that season and AZ would pay Willem II the same amount of money as they paid Ajax for purchasing Haatrecht during the summer break. However Haatrecht's performances at AZ were great and Willem II demanded more money. AZ paid him with an all-in salary and when the transfer fund was raised Haatrecht would earn less money and he told both clubs that he would quit football if Willem II would not cooperate.

=== Surinam Airways plane crash ===
Haatrecht would not play professional football for two seasons and joined amateur side VV Neerlandia '31 where is nephew and brother were also playing. In 1988, he returned to professional football as he was awarded to sign a contract at SC Heerenveen. In 1989 Winnie was invited by Sonny Hasnoe, the founder of the Colourful 11 to be part of the team and travel to Suriname to play in the "Boxel Kleurrijk Tournament" with three Surinamese teams. However Winnie withdrew from the squad close to the deadline as he had to play with his team in the play-offs. As a result, brother Jerry was asked to join the team instead of Winnie, which he immediately accepted. During the flight Jerry switched seats with Edu Nandlal. The Surinam Airways Flight PY764 crashed during approach to Paramaribo-Zanderij International Airport, killing 176 of the 187 on board, including Haatrecht, making it the worst ever aviation disaster in Suriname's history. Among the dead were a total of 15 members of the Colourful 11, only three of them survived. Nandlal was one of the survivors and was rescued first when Haatrecht was still alive, but died shortly after. One of the other survivors was his friend Sigi Lens.

=== Switzerland ===
Winnie Haatrecht was totally shocked by the disaster and his brother's death. However three days after the accident he played with SC Heerenveen in the play-offs and a minute of silence was held. All eyes were on Haatrecht and his emotions were easily seen. The health of their mother who was fighting against cancer became worse after the disaster and she died in 1991. He felt guilty and he decided it was better to move from all the media attention and signed a contract with FC La Chaux-de-Fonds in the Swiss second division. The spell in Switzerland was no success as the team got into financial trouble with Haatrecht being one of the most expensive players in the squad and he had to leave and moved to Cambuur Leeuwarden.

In his final years of his career he played for TOP Oss. Coach Hans Dorjee wanted him seriously and even let him help him selecting other players for the team. Gus Uhlenbeek, Paul Nortan and Stanley MacDonald were signed on advice of Haatrecht and TOP Oss played a great season.

== Player's agent ==
After his career more and more players asked him to help them with their negotiations and after a while he started asking some money for his efforts. When he was 20 years old he had the dream to start a player's agency together with his friends and later fellow professional footballers Nortan, Lens, Jerry de Jong and Ulrich Wilson. That dream never became reality, although Lens and Haatrecht both did become a player's agent. Among Haatrecht's players were Ryan Babel, Gianni Zuiverloon, Stefano Denswil, Ruud Vormer and Afonso Alves. In 2012, the KNVB - Dutch FA investigated his involvement in the transfer of Dejan Meleg to Ajax.
