= Hamptoncourtpolder =

- Location within Suriname
- Coordinates: 5°53′38″N 56°54′49″W
- Country: Suriname
- District: Nickerie District
- Resort: Oostelijke Polders
- Elevation: 1 m (3.3 ft)
- Time zone: UTC-3 (ART)

Hamptoncourtpolder or (Hampton Court) is a settlement in the Nickerie District of northern Suriname, about 9 kilometres (5.6 mi) from the district capital, Nieuw Nickerie. In 1821, it started as a sugarcane plantation on the Nickerie River, and was named after Hampton Court Palace. In the beginning of the 20th century, it was subdivided in plots, and has been mainly used for rice cultivation. The name was also changed to Hamptoncourtpolder. The coordinates for the town are located at 5° 52' 59" N 56° 55' 0" W
