= Frederick Murray =

Frederick Murray may refer to:

- Frederick Murray (rugby union) (1871–1952), New Zealand rugby union player
- Fred Murray (coach) (c. 1892–1954), American football and basketball coach
- Feg Murray (1894–1973), American track athlete
- Frederick James Alexander Murray (1907–1954), Surinamese politician
- Fred Murray (born 1982), Irish footballer

== See also ==
- Freddy Murray (born 2003), tennis player from Northern Ireland
