= Westelijke Polders =

Coordinates: 5.3558°N 57.2355°W

- Resort
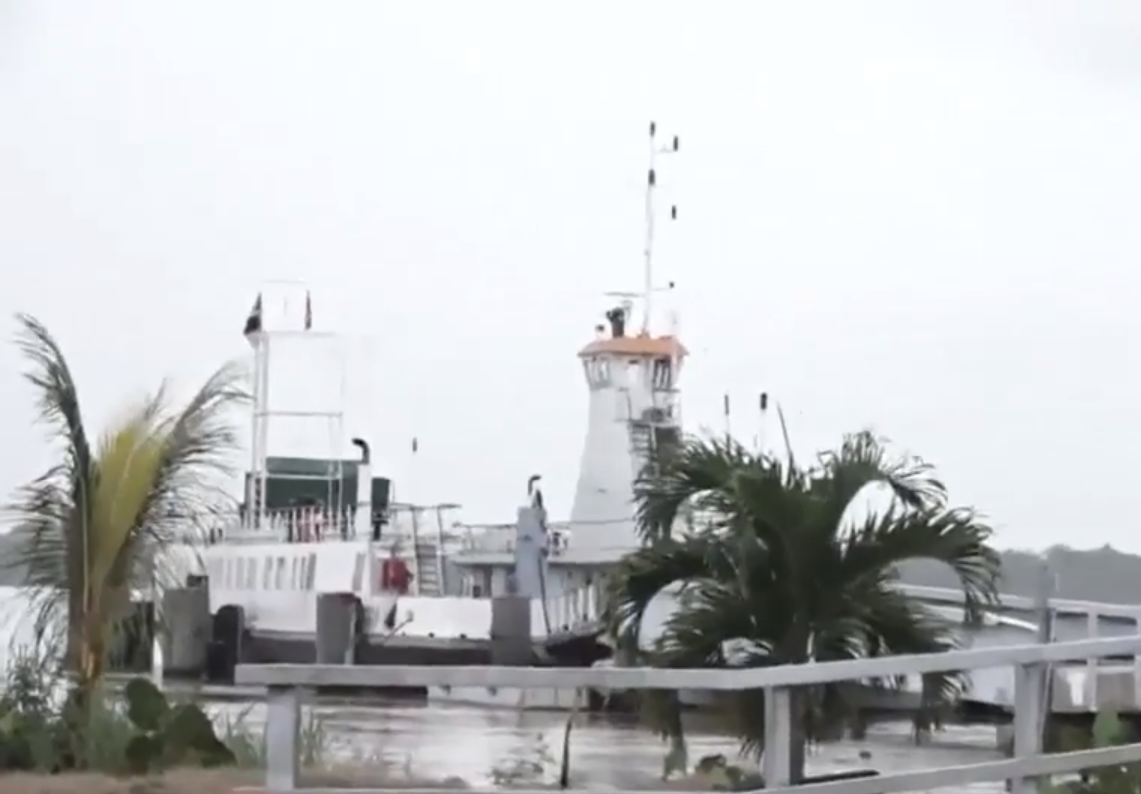
- Ferry to Guyana

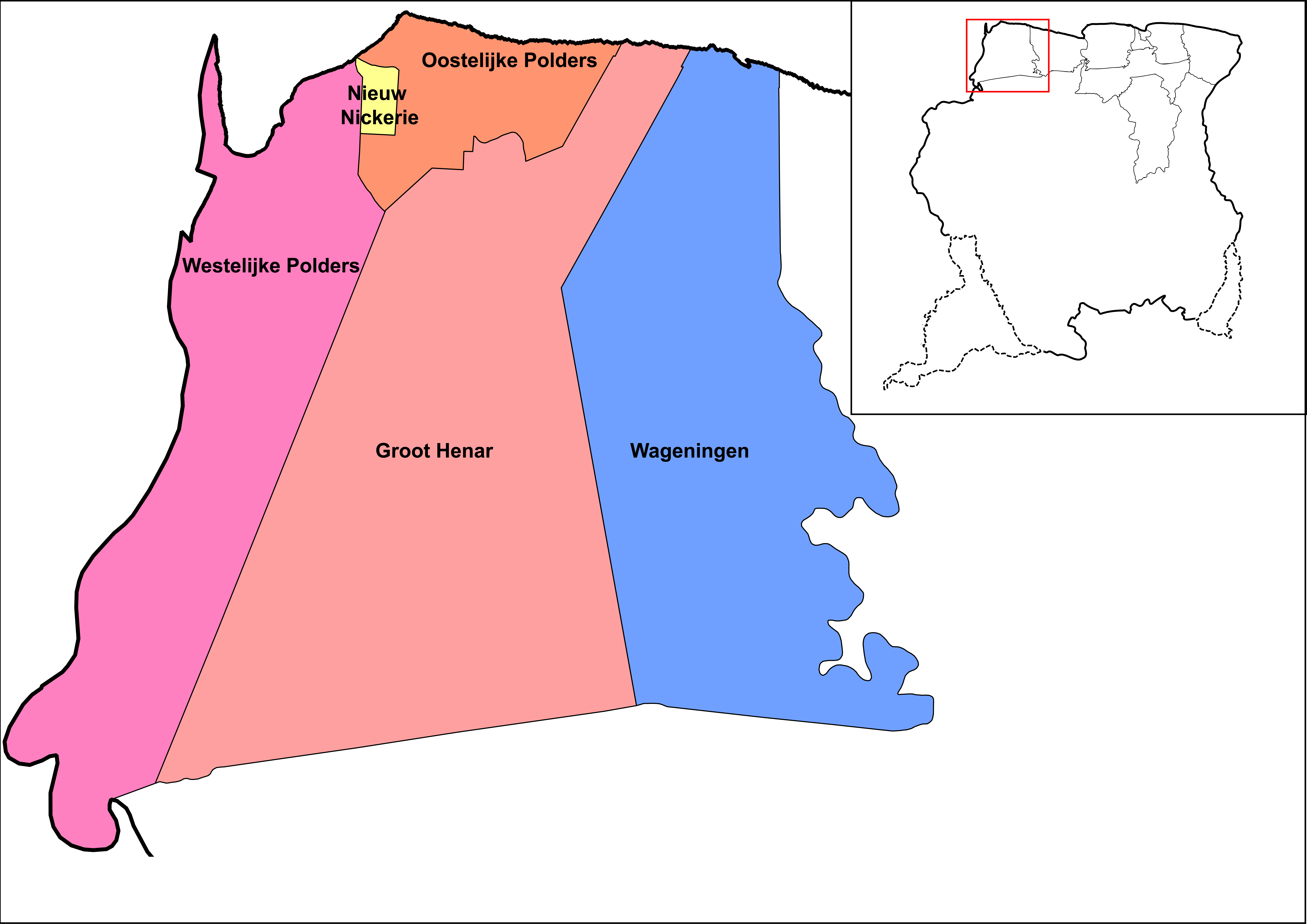
- Map showing the resorts of Nickerie District. Westelijke Polders
- Country: Suriname
- District: Nickerie District

Area
  - Total: 1,168 km^{2} (451 sq mi)

Population (2012)
  - Total: 8,616
  - Density: 7.377/km^{2} (19.11/sq mi)
- Time zone: UTC-3 (AST)

Westelijke Polders is a resort in Suriname, located in the Nickerie District. Its population at the 2012 census was 8,616. Its Dutch place name (in English 'western polders') reflects Suriname's colonial past. Its western boundary is the Courantyne River, between Suriname and Guyana.

Since 1998, the Canawaina ferry connects South Drain, located in the resort Westelijke Polders, with Moleson Creek in Guyana. This is the only legal connection between the two countries, but before the repavement of the road many travelers preferred to take a back-track route.

The uninhabited nature reserve Papagaaieneiland is located in the Courantyne. The route of the planned bridge between Suriname and Guyana will run through the island. As of 2020, the construction has not started.
