= Radio 10 =

Radio 10 may refer to:

- Radio 10 (Argentina), an Argentine talk radio station
- Radio 10 (Netherlands) (formerly Radio 10 Gold and Radio 10 FM), a Dutch commercial radio station
- Radio 10 (Suriname), also known as Radio 10 Magic FM, a commercial radio station in Suriname
- The former name of Singaporean radio station 987FM
