= Kumaka =

Kumaka may refer to:

- Kumaka, Barima-Waini, a village in northern Guyana, near the Atlantic coast
- Kumaka, East Berbice-Corentyne, a village in East Berbice-Corentyne, eastern Guyana, on the upper Essequibo River
- Kumaka Falls, a waterfall on the Essequibo River in Guyana
