= Manchester, Suriname =

Manchester
- Location within Suriname
- Coordinates: 5°53′N 56°54′W
- Country: Suriname
- District: Nickerie
- Elevation: 0.9 m (3.0 ft)

Population
  - Estimate (-): 748
- Time zone: UTC-3 (ART)

Manchester (pop. 748) is a region in the Nickerie District of northern Suriname, about 12 kilometres (7.5 mi) from the district capital, Nieuw Nickerie. The settlement is in a very low-lying area, only 0.9 metres (3 ft) above sea level.
