= Frederick Quick =

The Ven. Frederick Louis Quick was Archdeacon of Demerara from 1919 to 1927.

Quick was educated at St Boniface Missionary College, Warminster. He was ordained in 1875. After a curacy at SS Simon & Jude, Demerara he held incumbencies in New Amsterdam, Skeldon and Essequibo.
