= Hypostomus nickeriensis =

Scientific classification
- Kingdom: Animalia
- Phylum: Chordata
- Class: Actinopterygii
- Order: Siluriformes
- Family: Loricariidae
- Genus: Hypostomus
- Species: H. nickeriensis

Binomial name
- Hypostomus nickeriensis Boeseman, 1969

Species of catfish

Hypostomus nickeriensis is a species of catfish in the family Loricariidae. It is native to South America, where it occurs in the upper Nickerie River basin (for which the species is named) in Suriname. The species reaches 17 cm (6.7 inches) in standard length and is believed to be a facultative air-breather.
