= Nieuw Rotterdam =

- Former town
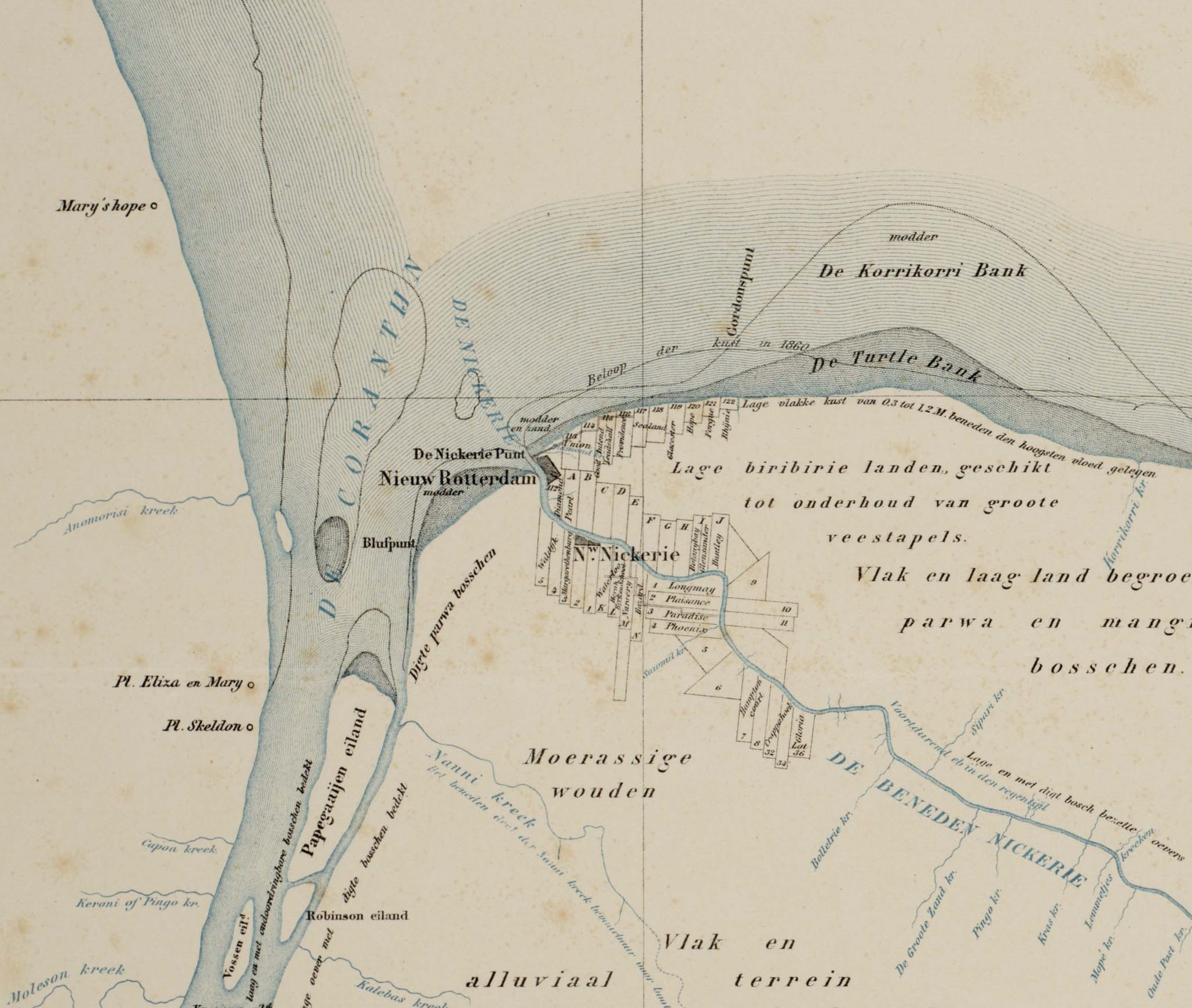
- Map fragment with Nieuw Rotterdam

- Location within Suriname
- Country: Suriname
- District: Nickerie District
- Resorts: Nieuw Nickerie
- Time zone: UTC-3 (AST)

Nieuw Rotterdam was the capital of the Nickerie District in Suriname, built on the right bank of the Nickerie River. Around 1875, this town got flooded by the sea. In 1879, on the left bank of the Nickerie River, the current capital Nieuw Nickerie was built, and Nieuw Rotterdam was formally abolished as a town a century later on 8 August 1979.

The settlement was built around 1820, and peaked in the 1860s. The town laid on the right bank of the mouth of the river Nickerie, on a narrow strip of land between the river and the Atlantic Ocean at a point called Cordonspunt.

The town was largely populated by traders who trade proficient with the neighboring Guyana, and was called "Eldorado of the smugglers". Nieuw Rotterdam was built in two perpendicular streets, including the Kerkstraat, which ran from south to north and ended with the tower of the church. The council also had several houses, a fortified military post and barracks.

The first storm came in 1866, and in 1875 there was another, which marks the end of Nieuw Rotterdam.
