= Oostelijke Polders =

Coordinates: 5.8587°N 56.8853°W

- Resort
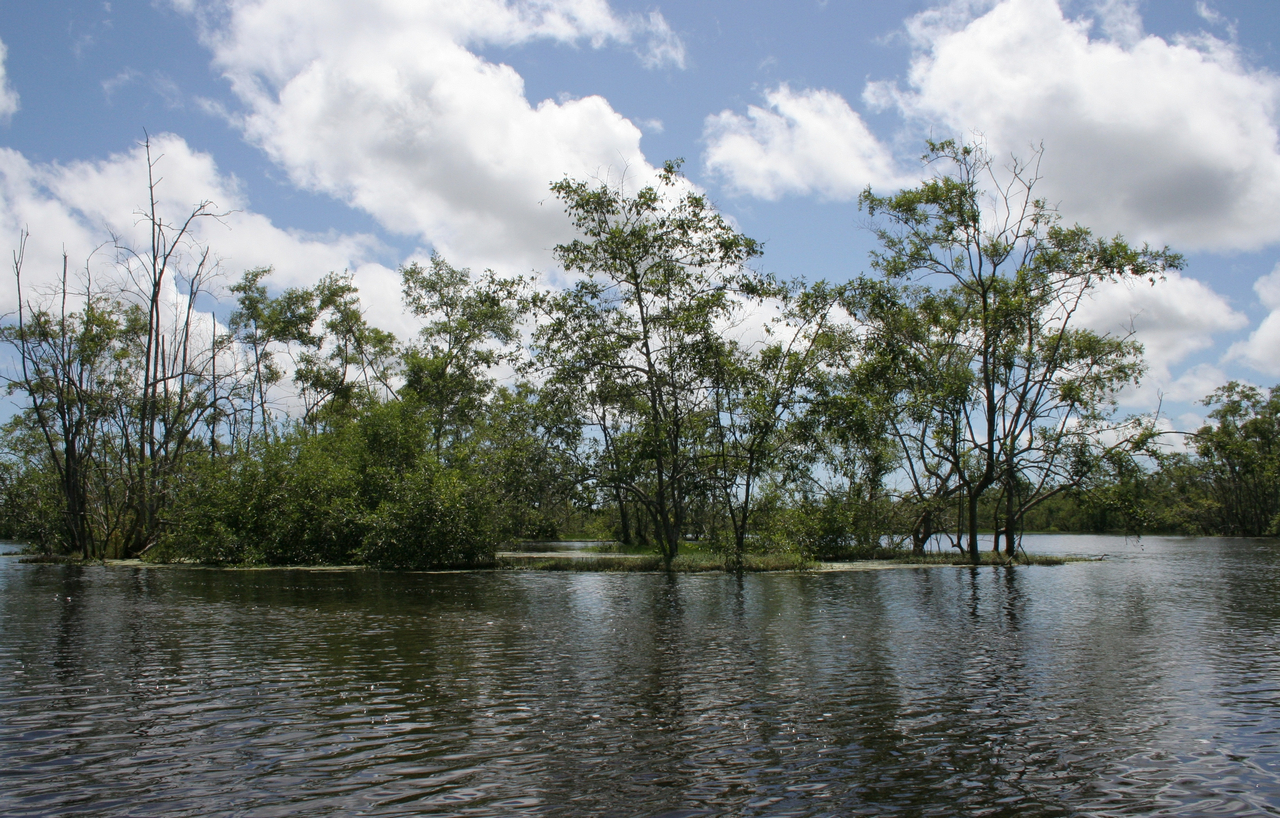
- Mangrove forest in Bigi Pan Nature Reserve

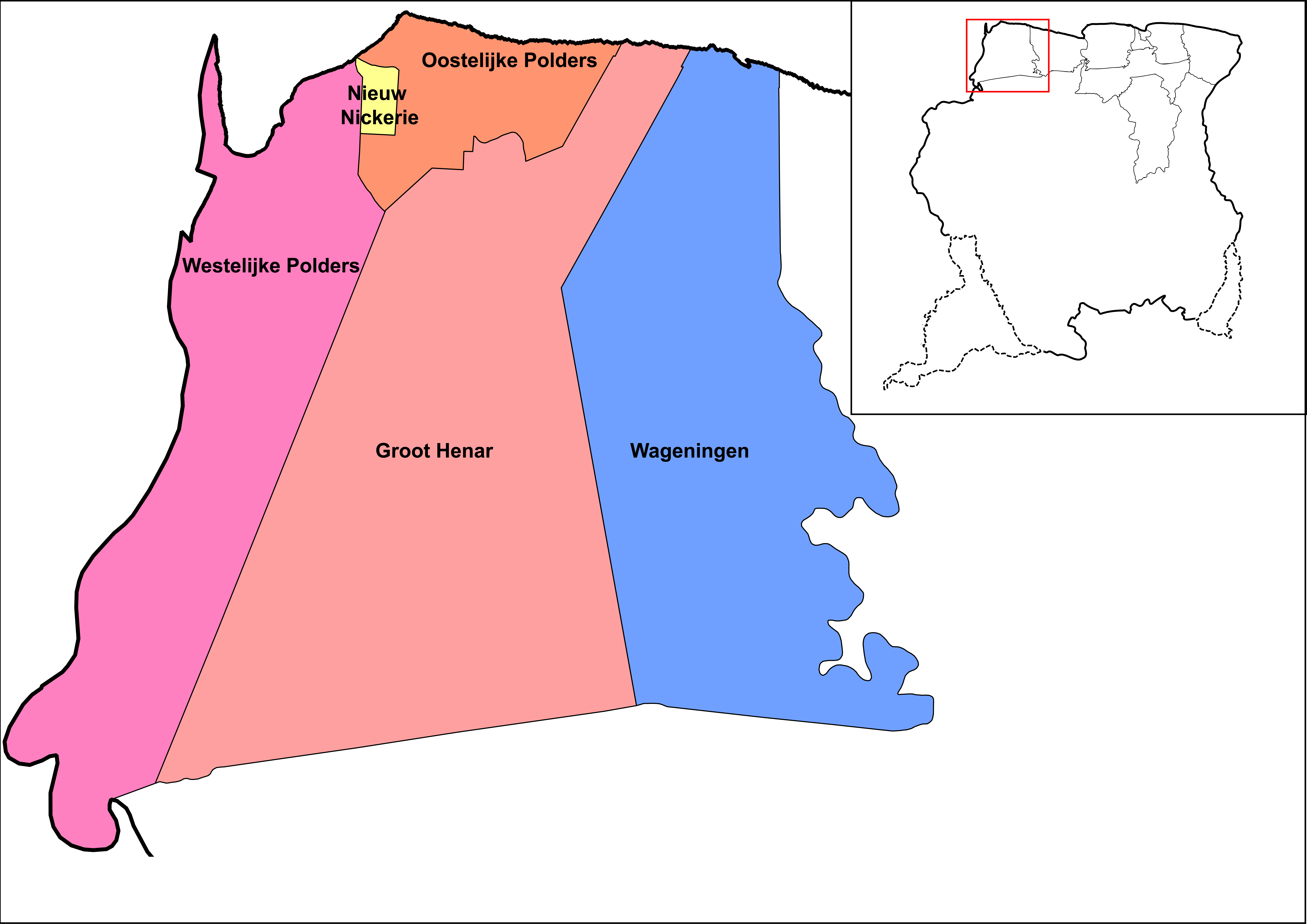
- Map showing the resorts of Nickerie District. Oostelijke Polders
- Country: Suriname
- District: Nickerie District

Area
  - Total: 357 km^{2} (138 sq mi)

Population (2012)
  - Total: 7,153
  - Density: 20.0/km^{2} (51.9/sq mi)
- Time zone: UTC-3 (AST)

Oostelijke Polders is a resort in Suriname located in the Nickerie District. Its population at the 2012 census was 7,153. Villages in the resort include Glasgow, Hamptoncourtpolder, and Paradise. Oostelijke Polders is an agricultural area with a focus on rice production. Oostelijke Polder has a clinic and a school.

== Bigi Pan Nature Reserve ==
Oostelijke Polders is home to the Bigi Pan Nature Reserve which is the third largest reserve in the country. It is located in the estuary north of the Nickerie River. The reserve has an area of 68,000 hectare of which 15,000 had been poldered for rice cultivation. The reserve is named after the lagoon in the centre.

== Hertenrits ==
Within the Bigi Pan Nature Reserve there are five terpen (artificial mounts). They were located in the middle of the swamp, and remains from the pre-Columbian era had been discovered in the mounts. Some of the finds were 15,000 to 20,000 year old.

Hertenrits measures hectares, and was designated a protected area in 1972. There were no laws concerning culture reserves at the time, therefore it was declared a nature reserve in 1972.

== Waterloo ==
Waterloo was a cotton plantation founded in 1819 by James Balfour which later became a sugar plantation. Waterloo would become one of the biggest plantation of Nickerie. In 1936, Waterloo was bought by Amin Sankar. The conditions were bad at the sugar estate, and the contract workers were not allowed to enter or leave the plantation without permission from the owner. In 1969, a strike was called by Eddy Bruma. Sankar fired all workers, and closed the estate. In 2020, Waterloo was taken over by the jungle.

== Notable people ==
- Frederick James Alexander Murray (1907–1954), politician
- Dew Sharman (1965), politician and medical doctor.
