= Soekhoe's Broadcasting Suriname =

- Nieuw Nickerie; Suriname
- Broadcast area: Nieuw Nickerie; Paramaribo
- Frequency: 91,1 MHz (Paramaribo)

Programming
- Language: Dutch
- Format: Full service

Ownership
- Owner: Johny Mahepalsingh

History
- First air date: June 2004 (radio and television)

Soekhoe's Broadcasting Suriname (SBS) is a Surinamese media company. It was founded in 2004 by Harrypersad Soekhoe and sold to new owners in 2013. Based in Nieuw Nickerie, it broadcasts a radio station and a television channel locally on channel 28, while it also owns a subsidiary station on UHF channel 32 in Wanica, covering Paramaribo.

== History ==
Harrypersad Soekhoe was long interested in joining the media world; this was accomplished in June 2004 with the opening of the SBS radio and television stations. A local series, Suma Kong, started broadcasting on August 31, 2005. A DVD copy of the series was sent to District Commissioner Hein Ramnewash on September 5. In June 2006, it aired an educational program for primary school students, GLOverrijk je kennis. The airtime (Tuesday and Thursday afternoons) was criticized by Radjkoemar Autar because, at the time, it coincided with the 2006 FIFA World Cup. On July 1, 2008, it started using an outside broadcast van, the second in Nickerie after Rasonic TV.

In early October 2008, facing strong rains, thunder damaged SBS's television transmitter and other equipments; it was assessed that SBS experienced a loss of US$60,700-70,000 in damages. The transmitter collapsed again on July 10, 2009.

At the end of June 2013, Soekhoe sold the stations in Nickerie to Johny Mahepalsingh, effective July 1. The station in Wanica was rented to the Soekharadj family at the time, but it was unknown how the issue would be solved. Mahepalsingh and his aideRashied Doekhie were abroad at the time; until they returned to Suriname, the stations were controlled by Bisnoepersad Dalloesingh, Kenneth Donk and Sayed Sardha.

== Technical information ==
The Wanica station provides SBS TV on channel 32.1 and Sargam on 32.2.

== Controversies ==
Sasur issued a complaint to SBS for the broadcast of international content without authorization. Ishara was also affected.
