= Imran Jafferally =

Guyanese cricketer (born 1980)

Personal information
- Full name: Imran Asrafali Jafferally
- Born: 23 July 1980 (age 46); Skeldon, East Berbice-Corentyne, Guyana
- Batting: Left-handed
- Bowling: Left-arm medium

Domestic team information
- Years: Team
- 2004/05–2006/07: Guyana

Career statistics
Competition	First-class
Matches	5
Runs scored	27
Batting average	6.75
100s/50s	–/2
Top score	15*
Balls bowled	642
Wickets	9
Bowling average	31.66
5 wickets in innings	–
10 wickets in match	–
Best bowling	3/25
Catches/stumpings	4/–
- Source: CricketArchive, 14 October 2011

Imran Jafferally (born 23 July 1980) is a former Guyanese cricketer who played first-class cricket for Guyana between the 2004/05 and 2006/07 seasons. He was born at Skeldon, East Berbice-Corentyne.
