= Blanche Marie Falls =

Waterfall in Suriname

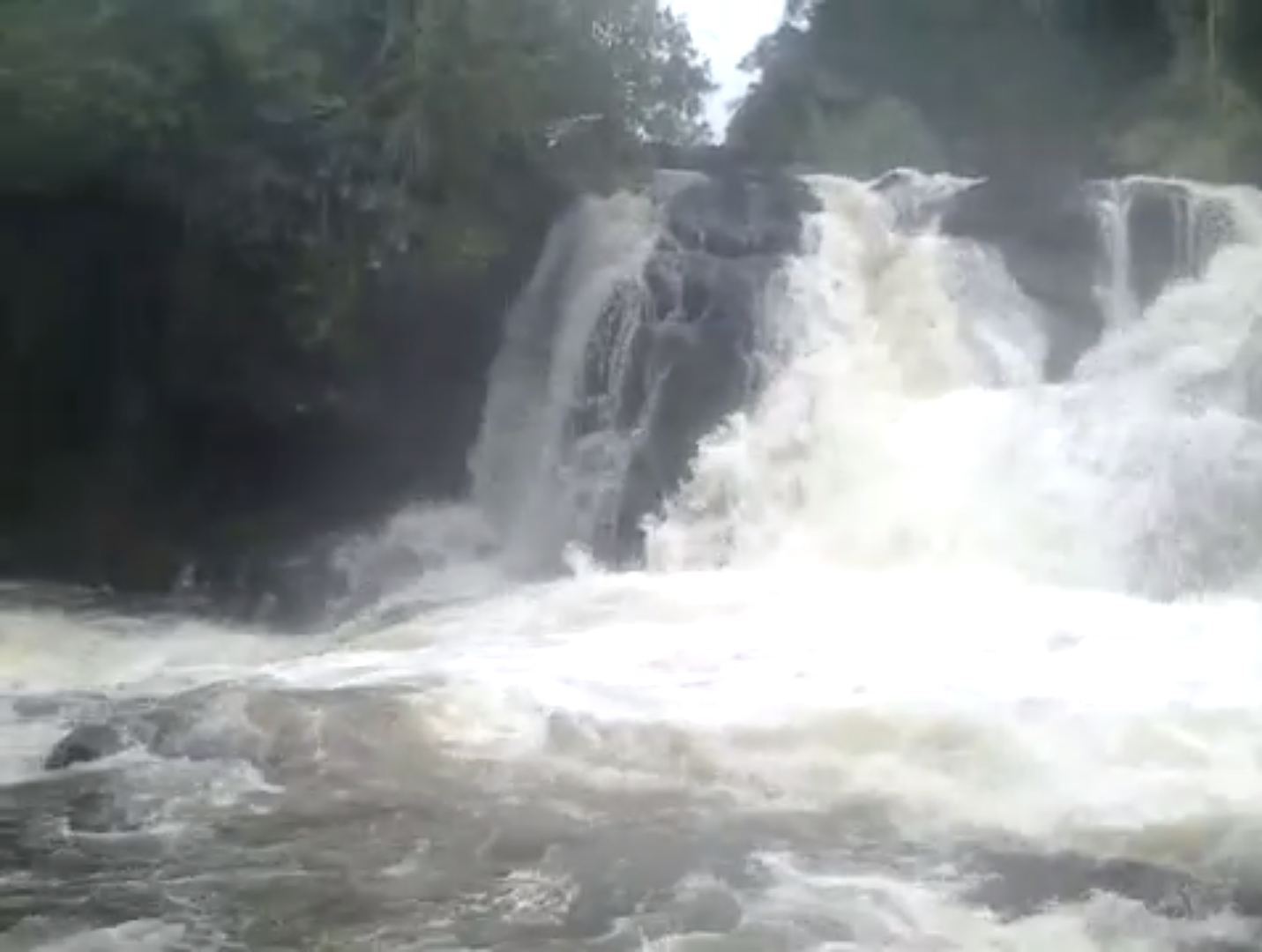
- Blanche Marie Falls

- Location within Suriname
- Location: Nickerie River, Suriname
- Coordinates: 4.755833°N 56.879444°W
- Total height: 158 m (518 ft)

The Blanche Marie Falls (Dutch: Blanche Marievallen) is one of the largest waterfalls of Suriname. The falls are located on the Nickerie River.

The Blanche Marie Falls were discovered in 1897 by Corstiaan van Drimmelen, who was district commissioner of Nickerie at the time. Van Drimmelen named the falls after his wife. The falls are a popular tourist destination and can be reached by car via the Southern East-West Link.
