= Wageningen, Suriname =

Wageningen
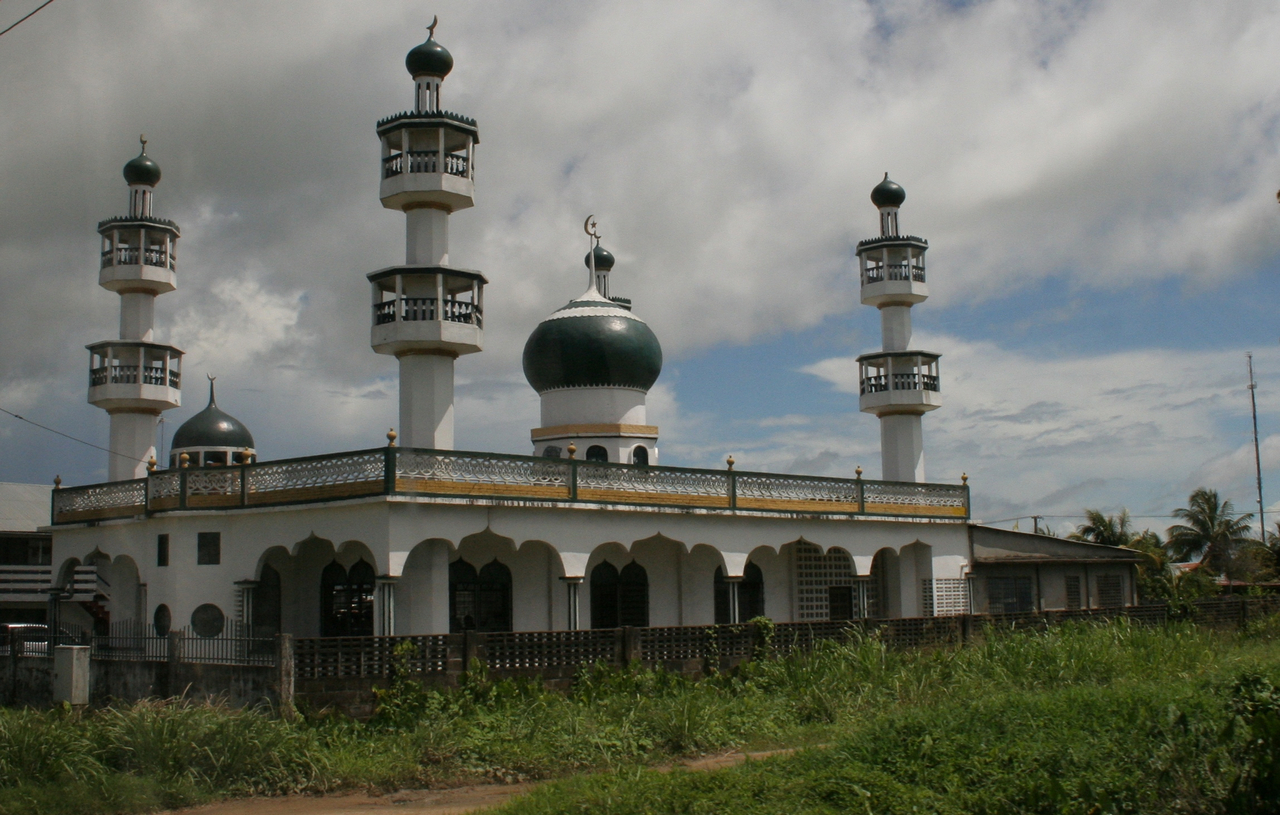
- Mosque in Wageningen

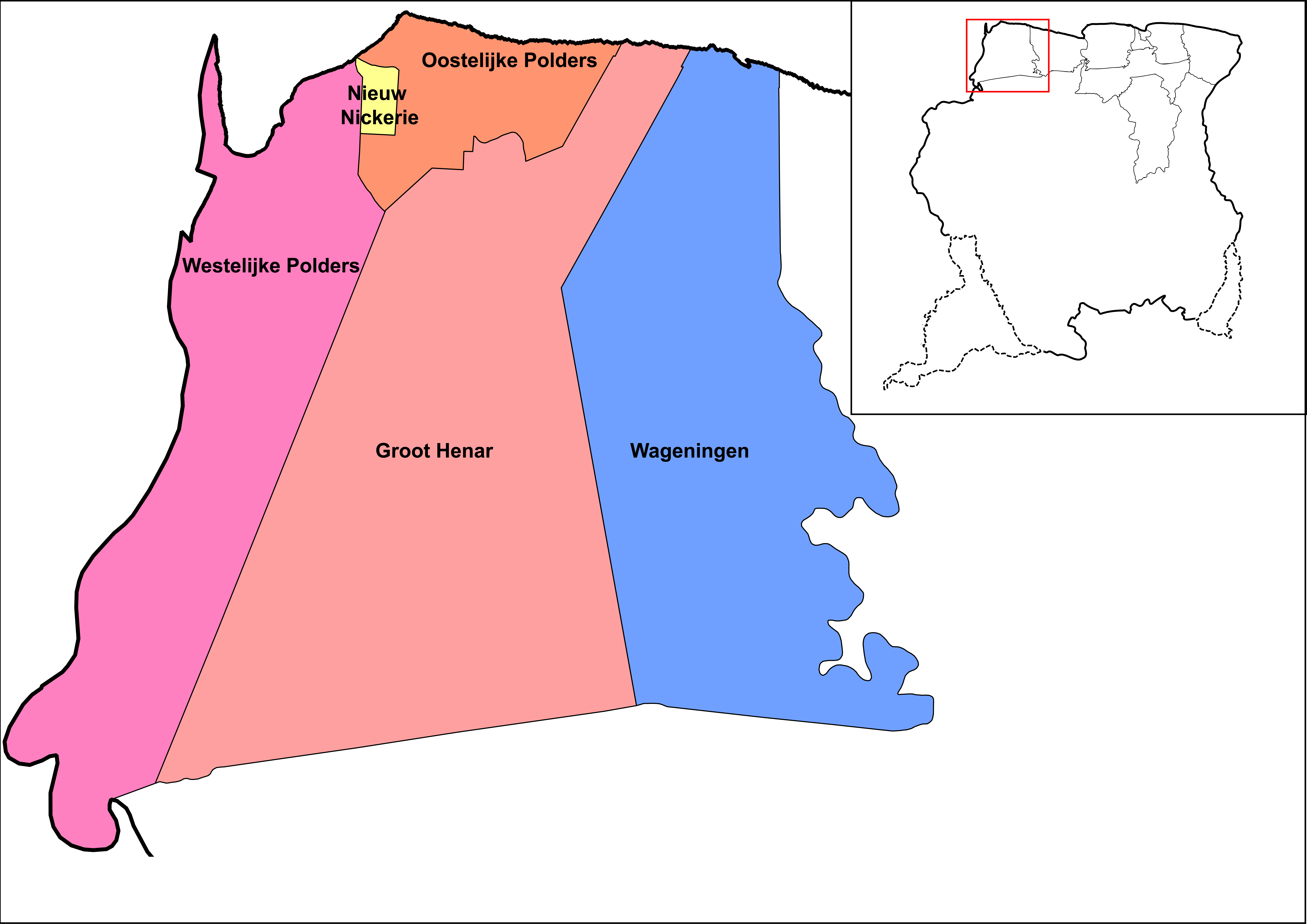

- Location in Suriname
- Coordinates: 5°46′8″N 56°41′11″W
- Country: Suriname
- District: Nickerie District
- Established: 1948
- Named for: Wageningen, Netherlands

Area
  - Total: 1,613 km^{2} (623 sq mi)
- Elevation: 1 m (3.3 ft)

Population (2012 census)
  - Total: 2,937
  - Density: 1.821/km^{2} (4.716/sq mi)

Wageningen is a community resort and an agricultural place in the Republic of Suriname and located in the coastal area of West Suriname in the Nickerie District, at the harbour of the Nickerie River across the right estuary of the Maratakka River. The town was known as the rice centre of Suriname, Wageningen has been founded in 1949 and named after the Dutch city of Wageningen.

== Overview ==
Wageningen has the presence of large piece of fertile land, desired climate with enough rainfall and the absence of natural disasters. The first trials in mechanized rice production started in 1933, and an area of 10,000 hectares (25,000 acres) was allocated for rice production. The Stichting Machinale Landbouw (Foundation for mechanised agriculture) was founded on 27 July 1949 for the mechanized rice production and a town was constructed for the work force which mainly consisted of former military. The town was named Wageningen after the Dutch city, and university.

The village of Wageningen is located about 54 kilometres (34 miles) east of New Nickerie, the main city of Nickerie District and 203 kilometres (126 miles) west of Paramaribo, the capital city of Suriname. Wageningen has a police office, an administrative office and a general practice center. There is also a landing strip for small airplanes for agricultural purposes. In 1973, the four-metre (thirteen-foot) high statue Alida was placed in the central square of the village to commemorate 110 years since the abolition of slavery. The statue was created by George Barron and commissioned by Stichting Machinale Landbouw.

During the 1980s a period of decline started in the rice production, and in December 2010, Staatsolie announced a program of ethanol production from sugarcane. The rice factory of Stichting Machinale Landbouw which closed down, restarted its operation in 2018.

== Lokono Shikuabana ==
Lokono Shikuabana (until 11 March 2013: Post Utrecht) is an Indigenous village of the Lokono people near Wageningen on the other side of the Nickerie River. The village is located at a former police outpost called Post Utrecht. Lokono Shikuabana suffers from limited water supply, and only has electricity during the evening. As of 2022, the population is about 115 people, and the village chief is Dorothy Marius-Lambert.

== Cupido ==
Cupido (also: Kipido; location: 5.6512°N 56.6817°W) is an Indigenous village of the Lokono people. It is located on the Maratakka River about 20 kilometres from its mouth. The village is built on sand hill overlooking the river amongst swamp forests and savannas. The population as of 2022 is 26 people, and the village chief is Runaldo Daniël.
