= Skeldon, Guyana =

Skeldon
- Location in Guyana
- Coordinates: 5°53′N 57°8′W
- Country: Guyana
- Region: East Berbice-Corentyne

Population (2012)
  - Total: 2,275

Skeldon is a small town in eastern coastal Guyana, on the estuary of the Corentyne River, which forms Guyana's border with Suriname. As of 2012, it had a population of 2,275. Skeldon and Springlands have been administratively merged into Corriverton.

== Economy ==
Sugar production forms the backbone to the local economy. The Guyana Sugar Corporation, Guyana's main sugar processing company, has a factory and works at Skeldon.

Hundreds of people had to look for other lucrative jobs after the closure of the sugar estate, for example; fishermen, taxi drivers, chauffeurs, farmers, store workers, etc

== Transport ==
The town is served by hundreds of hire cars that connect the town to Georgetown and other villages. At Moleson Creek, the Stelling with ferry services to Suriname is located. There is an airstrip for small aircraft within GuySuco's Skeldon Sugar Estate's premises.

== Notable people ==
- Imran Jafferally (1980), cricketer
- Carlston Harris (1987), mixed martial artist
