= Radio 10 (Suriname) =

Coordinates: 5.836281°N 55.161134°W

Radio 10 Magic FM
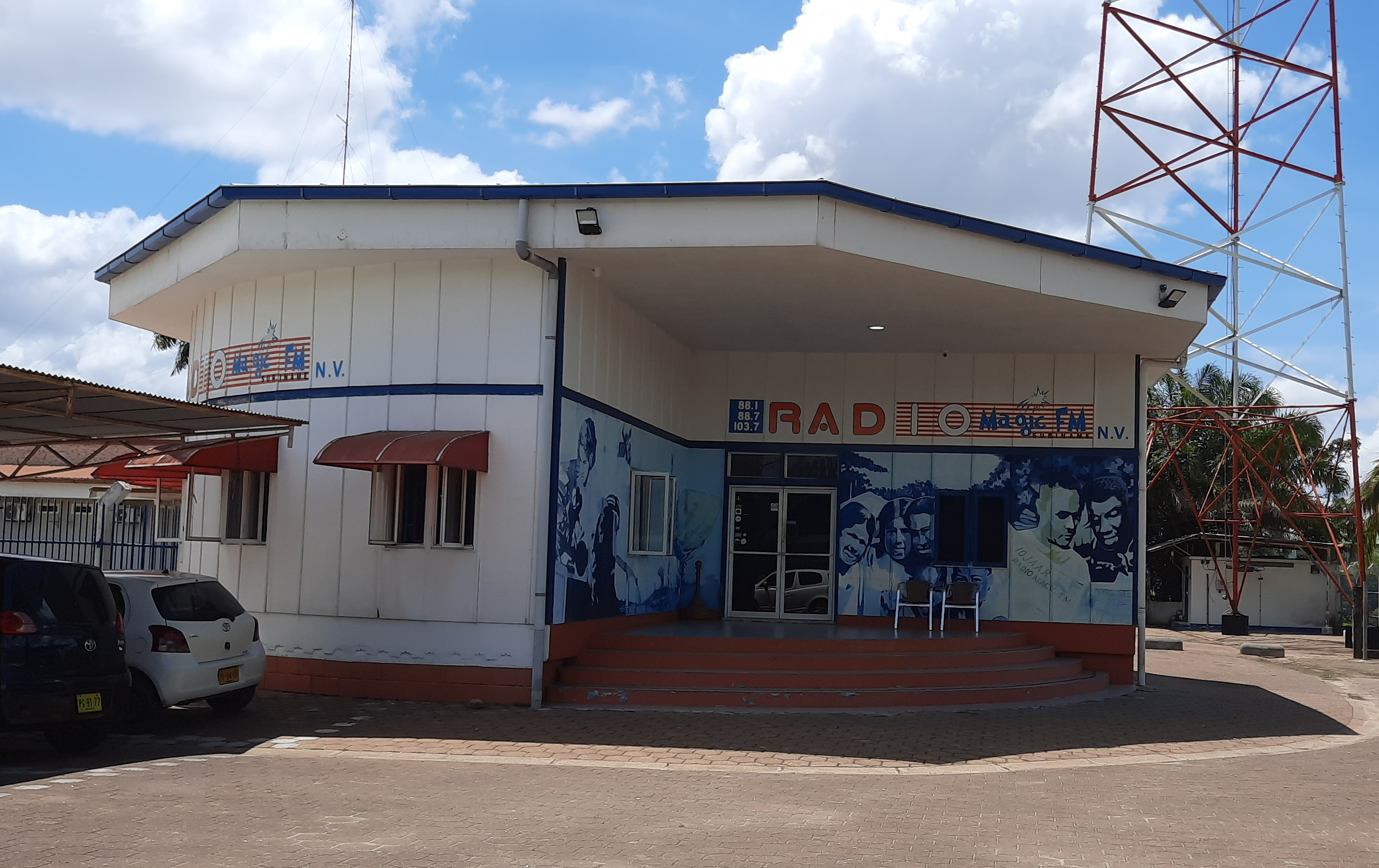
- Radio 10 station building, 2022

Paramaribo; Suriname
- Broadcast area: Paramaribo, Nickerie and Moengo
- Frequencies: 88.1, 88.7 and 103.7 FM

Programming
- Format: AC, CHR

Ownership
- Owner: Werner Duttenhofer

History
- First air date: December 10, 1996
- Call sign meaning: Magic FM

Links
- Website: https://radio10.sr/

Radio 10 Magic FM is a commercial radio station in Suriname.

== Trivia ==
Radio 10 "MAGIC" FM is the first radio station broadcasting the exact time in Suriname with the aid of a GPS/DCF computer. This computer manages everything in the studio that involves time and date.

== History ==
December 10, 2006 / The new face of Radio 10 Magic FM is an idea of Werner Duttenhofer as a gift in celebration of 10 years 10 and was realized by 3 artist namely. Ray Daal, August Bohé & Sojo Prijatno.

== Crew ==
- Werner Jr. Duttenhofer
- Jerome Duttenhofer
- Elvin Duttenhofer
- Jardell Rose
- Steven van Frederikslust
- Bicham Chandralal
- Gerda Duttenhofer
- Sidney Grunberg
- Raúl Kandhai
- Ryan Rozenblad
- Jennifer Thompson Suriname
- Raynel Dalen
- Ruben Tjopawiro
- Marynho Tanoeleksono
- George Tarsa
- Renuka Girjasing
- Giwani Zeggen
- Maureen Boodie
- Rodney Deekman
- Sandra Mangalie
- Debby Sodikromo

== Schedule ==
Weekdays News every hour starting at 06:00 till 8:00 10:00 and 18:00

| Time | Program |
|---|---|
| 06:00 08:00 | Ontbijtradio |
| 08:00 10:00 | Arbeidsvitaminen |
| 10:00 12:00 | Magic Cafe |
| 12:00 13:00 | Club Tropicana |
| 16:00 18:00 | The "Hit" Factory |
| 18:00 19:00 | Sundown |
| 19:00 20:00 | 70's at seven |
| 20:00 21:00 | 80's at eight |
| 21:00 22:00 | 90's at nine |
| 22:00 00:00 | Magic Moments |

Saturday News at 06:00, 07:00, 08:00, 12:00 and 18:00u

| 10:00 11:00 | 90 Seconden |
| 15:00 16:00 | The Top 100 |
| 20:00 21:00 | Magic 10 |
| 21:00 | Saturnight Nightlife |

Sunday News at 12:00 and 16:00u

| 07:00 09:00 | Tussen zeven en negen |
| 09:00 11:00 | Magic Variety |
| 11:00 12:00 | Telesur info / KKF info / Muziek |
| 12:00 13:00 | 10 op Zondag |
| 13:00 18:00 | Hits & Classic Sunday |
| 18:00 21:00 | Sabor Con Calor |
| 21:00 22:00 | The Top 100 (replay) |
| 22:00 | Night Wave |
