= Orealla =

- Location in Guyana
- Coordinates: 5°17′50″N 57°20′50″W
- Country: Guyana
- Region: East Berbice-Corentyne

Government
  - Toshao: Carl Peneux (2019)
- Elevation: 36 ft (11 m)

Population (2012)
  - Total: 981

Orealla (or Orealla Mission) is an Indigenous community in the East Berbice-Corentyne Region of Guyana, on the Courantyne River, approximately 33 miles (53 km) south of Crabwood Creek and 11 miles (18 km) north of Epira, located at 5°17′50″N 57°20′50″W, altitude 11 metres (36 ft). 15 miles (24 km) south-east on the other side of the Courantyne River lies the Surinamese village of Apoera. Orealla is an indigenous village.

The village can only be reached by boat or plane. The population is mainly active in subsistence agriculture and logging.

Orealla has a contract with the Barama Company, a logging company.

Small ocean-going vessels can reach the first rapids at Orealla by traversing the Courantyne River.

== Cultural references ==
Guyanese novelist Roy Heath wrote a 1984 novel entitled Orealla, featuring a Macusi Indian from the village. Clark Accord wrote the novel Between Apoera and Oreala, which was published in 2005.
