= South Drain, Suriname =

South Drain Zuiddrain
- Village
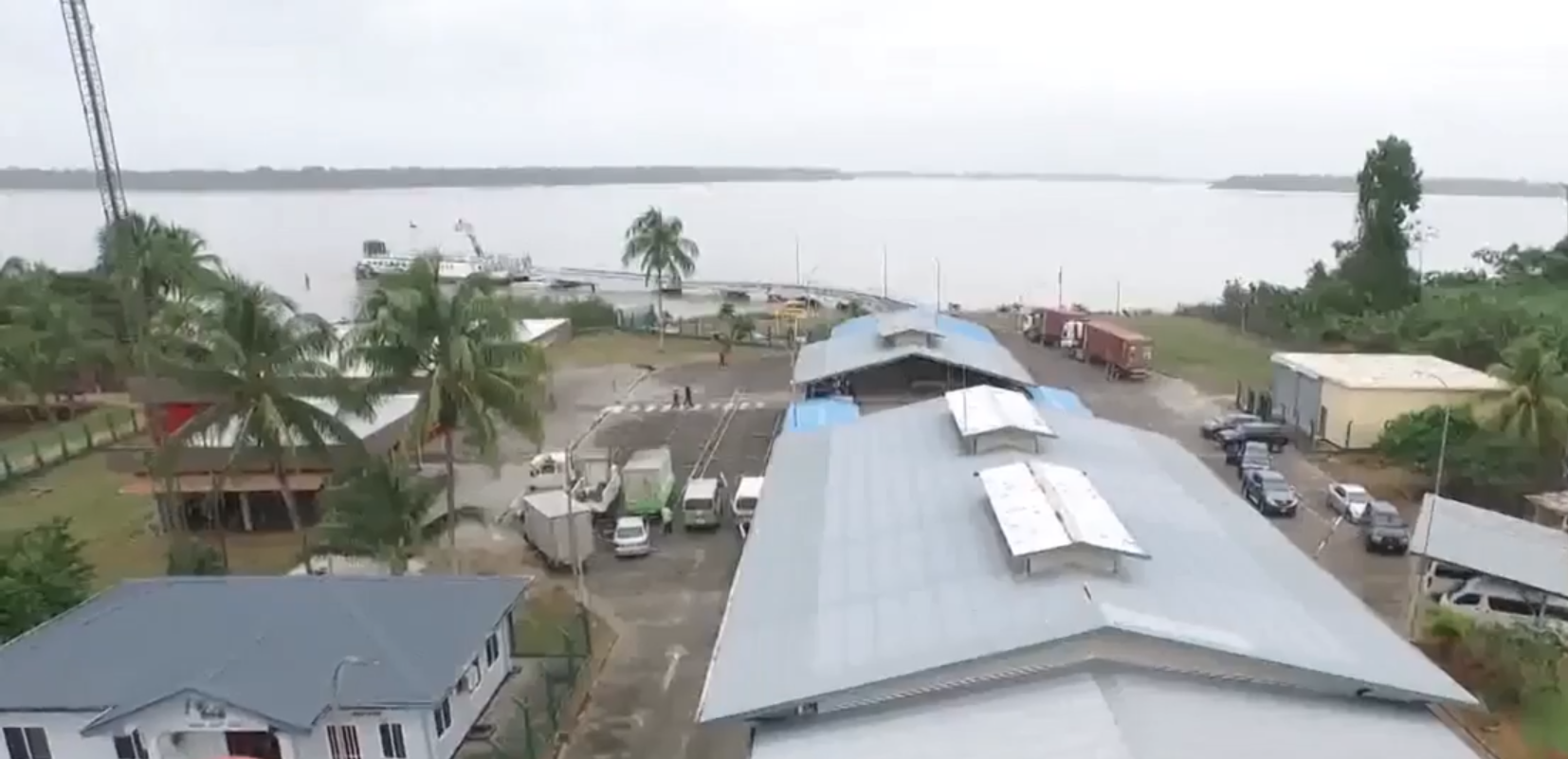
- Ferry Canawaima

- Location in Suriname
- Coordinates: 5°44′57″N 57°8′6″W
- Country: Suriname
- District: Nickerie District
- Resort (municipality): Westelijke Polders

South Drain, also Zuiddrain, is a town in western Suriname. Since the pavement of 32 kilometres (20 mi) road section to Nieuw Nickerie, it is the final destination of the northern East-West Link. The European Union funded the reconstruction, which started in 2007, with 13.2 million euro. The section was opened on 30 April 2010. There is a jeep trail between South Drain and Apoera, connecting the Northern East-West Link with the Southern East-West Link. Contrary to earlier plans, the pavement of this road is not imminent.

== Suriname-Guyana border ==
Since 1998, the CANAWAIMA ferry connects South Drain with Moleson Creek in Guyana. This is the only legal connection between the two countries, but before the repavement of the road many travelers preferred to take a back-track route.

With the completion of the Berbice Bridge in December 2008, and the earlier completion of the Coppename Bridge in 1999, the Courantyne River is the only river between the Guyanese capital of Georgetown and the Surinamese capital of Paramaribo still left without a bridge.
