= Glasgow, Suriname =

Glasgow
- Location within Suriname
- Coordinates: 5°55′N 56°55′W
- Country: Suriname
- District: Nickerie
- Elevation: 1 m (3.3 ft)

Population
  - Estimate (-): 776
- Time zone: UTC-3 (ART)

Glasgow (pop. 776) is a region in the Nickerie District of northern Suriname, about eight kilometres (5.0 mi) from the district capital, Nieuw Nickerie.
