= Ronald Hoop =

Dutch-Surinamese footballer (born 1967)

Personal information
- Date of birth: April 4, 1967 (age 59)
- Place of birth: Nieuw Nickerie, Suriname
- Height: 1.77 m (5 ft 9 1/2 in)
- Position: Striker

Senior career*
Years	Team	Apps	(Gls)
1986–1988	BVC de Bilt		
1988–1989	Utrecht		
1989–1990	BVC de Bilt		
1990–1991	Hilversum		
1991–1994	Telstar	112	(52)
1994–1996	Dordrecht '90	51	(18)
1996–1997	Palermo	7	(1)
1997	FC Baden		
1997–1998	Waldhof Mannheim	14	(5)
1998–1999	Schaffhausen		
1999–2001	Darmstadt 98	55	(20)
2001–2002	SV Sandhausen		
2002–2004	Germania 03 Pfungstadt		
2004–2008	Elinkwijk		
- * Club domestic league appearances and goals

Ronald Hoop (born April 4, 1967 in Nieuw Nickerie, Suriname) is a former Dutch-Surinamese football player.

== Career ==
After starting his career with amateur side BVC in De Bilt, Utrecht, Hoop spent his career playing with several clubs throughout Europe, including one year at then Serie B side Palermo, becoming the first foreigner being signed by the rosanero in over 20 years, but failing to impress with the Sicilian side who ultimately dropped to Serie C1 that season. He then spent his later years playing with clubs in Germany and Switzerland, then choosing to quit professional football in 2004 and joining amateur club USV Elinkwijk. In April 2006, Hoop scored Elinkwijk's 1200th goal in history.

He retired in 2008 at the age of 41.
