= Frederick James Alexander Murray =

Surinamese politician

Frederick James Alexander Murray (5 September 1907 – 6 May 1954) was a Surinamese politician of the NPS.

Murray was born in Waterloo, Nickerie District. At the age of 17, he started work as an assistant teacher. Later he became a qualified teacher after which he studied in Europe. Upon return in Suriname, he worked as a teacher. At the 1951 Surinamese general election he was elected for the Marowijne District as a member of the Estates of Suriname. Murray died in 1954 at the age of 46.
