= Crabwood Creek =

- town
- Location in Guyana
- Coordinates: 05°51′N 57°09′W
- Country: Guyana
- Region: East Berbice–Corentyne

Government
  - Type: Neighborhood Democratic Council
  - Chairman: Tero Arjune

Population (2012)
  - Total: 4,459
- Time zone: UTC-4
- Climate: Af

Crabwood Creek is a small community on the Corentyne River in the East Berbice–Corentyne region of Guyana. The population of 4,459 people as of 2012 and primarily Indo-Guyanese.

== Economy ==
Crabwood Creek is predominantly agricultural, producing large-scale rice, cane, cash-crop and provisions. It is located approximately two miles from the larger town of Corriverton, home to the Guyana Sugar Corporation's Skeldon Estate which provided jobs to a majority of the surrounding communities before its closure. With assistance from the World Bank, Skeldon Estate was upgraded with a co-generation plant, meant to provide stable electricity to the residents of the surrounding communities, including Crabwood Creek. However, the operation has inefficiencies due to poor design.

Crabwood Creek has about 10 sawmills, general stores, supermarkets, mechanical workshops, a hardware store, a grocery, restaurants and a paddy drying floor for the use of rice production.

The village is near Moleson Creek, the location of the Guyana-Suriname Ferry Stelling, so there is frequent trade between Crabwood Creek and Suriname.

== Services ==
Crabwood Creek is the home to one primary school while the secondary schools are in adjacent towns such as Corriverton. There is also a mosque, three mandirs and the four churches in the village.

Crabwood Creek has one government funded Health Centre. The health centre is staffed by a clinic attendant, one mid-wife, three community health workers, and a weekly visit of a medex as of 2020. Patients are referred to nearby Skeldon Hospital for pharmacy and additional care.

== See also ==
- Guyana–Suriname relations
- Agriculture in Guyana
