= Corriverton =

- Location in Guyana
- Coordinates: 5°55′57″N 57°09′53″W
- Country: Guyana
- Region: East Berbice-Corentyne

Population (2012)
  - Total: 11,386

Corriverton is the easternmost town in Guyana. It lies at the mouth of the Corentyne River, opposite Nieuw Nickerie, Suriname, to which it is linked by ferry from South Drain.

Corriverton is located about 195 mi/313 km from Georgetown on the eastern side of Guyana, in the county of Berbice. Its population in 2012 was 11,386.

It is a modern administrative construction, formed from two older towns, Springlands and Skeldon, and several villages which were named, or rather numbered (e.g. '78'), after their sugar plantations, owned by Bookers.

Corriverton has a mixed population of Hindus, Christians and Muslims living together. It is the site of many mosques, temples and churches, and has an excellent educational system.

== Ferry ==
Since 1998, the CANAWAIMA ferry connects Moleson Creek, ten km south of Corriverton, with South Drain in Suriname. This is the only legal connection between the two countries, but before the repaving of the road many travelers preferred to take a back-track route.
