= Stanley MacDonald =

Dutch footballer

Stanley MacDonald (born 29 June 1966 in Amsterdam) is a Dutch footballer who played for Eerste Divisie clubs Stormvogels Telstar, SC Heerenveen, FC Oss, N.E.C and FC Eindhoven during the 1991-2001 football seasons. He also played a season with K. Beringen-Heusden-Zolder.
