= Kumaka, East Berbice-Corentyne =

Kumaka
- Village
- Location in Guyana
- Country: Guyana
- Region: East Berbice-Corentyne
- Time zone: UTC-4
- Climate: Af

Kumaka is a village in the East Berbice–Corentyne region of Guyana. It stands on the right bank of the upper Essequibo River, about 35 km above Apoteri and the confluence of the Rupununi River with the Essequibo, at an elevation of 105 metres (344 ft).
