= Moleson Creek =

- Location in Guyana
- Coordinates: 5°47′13″N 57°10′15″W
- Country: Guyana
- Region: East Berbice-Corentyne

Population (2012)
  - Total: 73

Moleson Creek is a community on the Corentyne River in the East Berbice-Corentyne region of Guyana, and home to the Guyana-Suriname ferry stelling. It is north of Orealla Mission, 10 km (6.2 mi) south of Corriverton, and approximately 90 km (56 mi) from New Amsterdam.

Moleson Creek is a farming area, including plantain and livestock. Most residents are of Indo-Guyanese descent. It has one primary school.

== Ferry port ==
Since 1998, the CANAWAIMA Perry connects Moleson Creek with South Drain in Suriname. This is the only legal connection between the two countries, but before the repavement of the road between South Drain and Nieuw Nickerie many travelers preferred to rake a back-track route, which is serviced by speedboats which are licensed to carry eight passengers.

Canawaima Management Company was launched between the governments of Guyana and Suriname in 1998 for managing the ferry. The ship MV Canawaima, was out of commission during 2019-2021, and a substitute vessel, MB Sandaka was used during that time. MV Canawaima operates daily except New Year’s Day, Good Friday, Christmas and Boxing Day, and has a capacity of 24 cars, and about 200 passengers.
