= Ulrich Wilson =

Dutch footballer (born 1964)

Personal information
- Full name: Ulrich Johan Wilson
- Date of birth: 5 May 1964 (age 62)
- Place of birth: Nieuw Nickerie, Suriname
- Position: Defender

Senior career*
Years	Team	Apps	(Gls)
1985–1989	Twente	58	(6)
1987–1988	→ Ipswich Town (loan)	6	(0)
1989–1994	Groningen	147	(5)
1994–1996	Volendam	28	(1)
1996–1997	Emmen	19	(0)
Total		258	(12)
- * Club domestic league appearances and goals

Ulrich Johan Wilson (born 5 May 1964) is a Dutch former professional footballer who played as a defender.

== Career ==
Born in Nieuw Nickerie, Suriname, Wilson played in the Netherlands with Twente, Groningen, Volendam and Emmen.

Wilson also played for English side Ipswich Town between December 1987 and April 1988, while on loan from Twente. At Ipswich, Wilson made six appearances in the Football League.
