= Groot Henar =

Coordinates: 5°51′26″N 56°53′13″W

- Resort
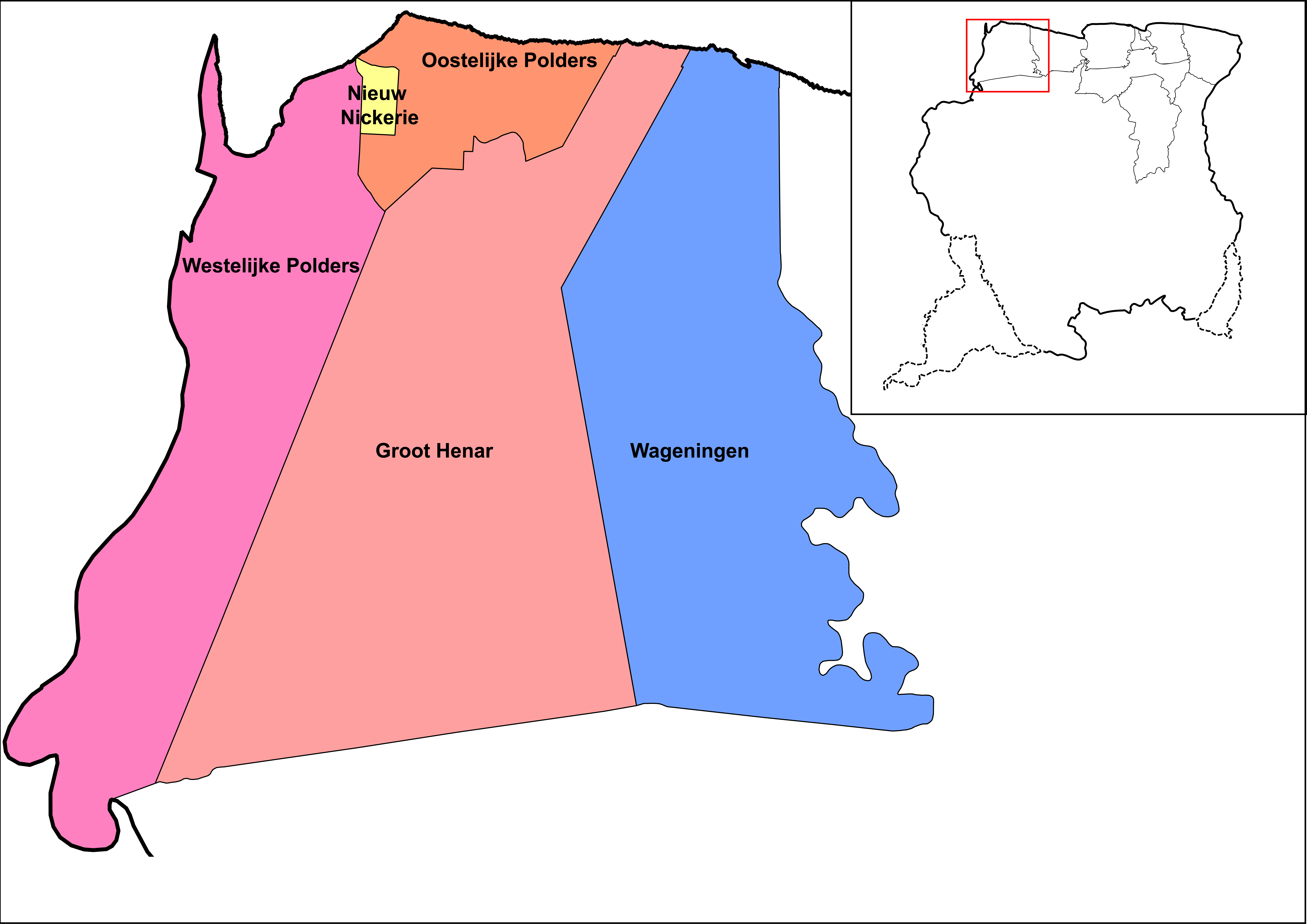
- Map showing the resorts of Nickerie District. Groot Henar
- Country: Suriname
- District: Nickerie District

Area
  - Total: 2,185 km^{2} (844 sq mi)
- Elevation: 0 m (0 ft)

Population (2012)
  - Total: 2,709
  - Density: 1.240/km^{2} (3.211/sq mi)
- Time zone: UTC-3 (AST)

Groot Henar is a resort in Suriname, located in the Nickerie District, near the bridge over the Nickerie River. Its population at the 2012 census was 2,709, most of which are East Indian. The resort has been named after the plantation Henar which was turned into small agricultural plots after the abolition of slavery. The cultivatable area was increased with the Henarpolder created in the 1920s. 1970 the Europolder was created adding 3,700 hectares to the resort.

Groot Henar has a school, and a clinic.
