= East Berbice-Corentyne =

Region of Guyana

Coordinates: 4.107943°N 58.18337°W

East Berbice-Corentyne Region 6
- Administrative Region
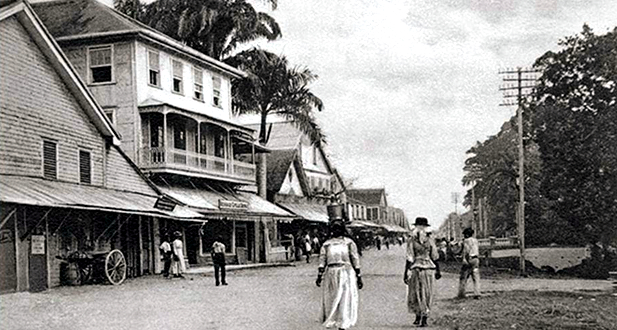
- Strand, New Amsterdam (before 1900)

- Flag

- Map of Guyana showing East Berbice-Corentyne region
- Country: Guyana
- Capital: New Amsterdam

Area
  - Total: 36,234 km^{2} (13,990 sq mi)

Population (2022 census)
  - Total: 114,574
  - Density: 3.1621/km^{2} (8.1897/sq mi)

East Berbice-Corentyne (Region 6) is one of ten regions in Guyana. Its capital is New Amsterdam. Located along the Guyana's border with Brazil and Suriname, it is spread over an area of 36,234 km^{2} (13,990 sq mi), making it the third largest region by area in Guyana. The southernmost section of East Berbice-Corentyne is claimed by Suriname as part of the Sipaliwini District. As per the 2022 census, it had a population of 114,574 inhabitants, and was the third most populous of the regions of Guyana. The major economic activities include livestock rearing, and agriculture.

== Geography ==
East Berbice-Corentyne (Region 6) is one of the ten administrative regions of Guyana. It is located between the Berbice and Corentyne Rivers, along the border with Brazil and Suriname. It is spread over an area of 36,234 km^{2} (13,990 sq mi), and is the third largest of the ten regions of Guyana by area. The region was established during the 1980 administrative reform of Guyana consisting of most of the area that was previously part of the East Berbice district and parts of Rupununi district. Its capital is at New Amsterdam, and other major towns include Rose Hall, and Corriverton.

The topography consists of mostly forested highlands and coastal plains with patches of savannah, and clay and sandy hills. It is the only region of Guyana to include all the four types of the geographic regions. The region has about 3.3 million hectares of forested area, covering almost 94% of its land area. The Torani Canal draws water from the Berbice River, and helps irrigate the agricultural lands. Black Bush Polder was a large swamp, which was redeveloped for settlement and agriculture.

Located at an elevation of 153.14 m (502.4 ft) above sea level, the district has a tropical rainforest climate (Köppen climate classification: Af). The average annual temperature is 24.35 °C (75.83 °F). The district receives an average annual rainfall of 13.3 cm (5.2 in) and has 248.4 average rainy days in a year.

=== Guyana-Suriname dispute ===
The Corentyne River forms the eastern border with Suriname, and the southernmost section of East Berbice-Corentyne is claimed by Suriname as part of the Sipaliwini District. It is known as the New River Triangle in Guyana or Tigri Area in Suriname.

== Demographics ==
As per the official census in 1980, the region had a population of 153,386 inhabitants. It decreased to 142,541 and 123,695 in the 1991 and 2002 census respectively. As per the 2022 census, it had a population of 114,574 inhabitants, making it the third most populous region in Guyana.

The major economic activities include livestock rearing, and agriculture. Major agricultural produce include rice, sugercane, vegetables, and coconut. Timber logging is a minor industry.

== Communities ==
Communities and settlements include:

- Adventure
- Albion
- Alnes
- Ankerville - Port Mourant
- Baracara (Barakara Mission/Wel te Vreeden)
- Belvedere
- Bloomfield
- Bound Yard - Port Mourant
- Brighton
- Bush Lot (Bush Lot Village)
- Canefield
- Chesney
- Clifton Settlement - Port Mourant
- Corriverton
- Crabwood Creek
- Cumberland (birthplace of Shimron Hetmyer}.
- Epira (Epira Mission, Espera)
- Friendship (Friendship Village, Corentyne)
- Free Yard - Port Mourant
- Fyrish (Fyrish Village)
- Gangaram
- Haswell - Port Mourant
- Johns Settlement - Port Mourant
- Kasuela (Cashew Island)
- Kumaka
- Lancaster (Lancaster Village)
- Leeds
- Letter Kenny
- Lesbeholden
- Limlair
- Liverpool
- Manchester
- Mibikuri
- Miss Phoebe North And South- Port Mourant
- Moleson Creek
- New Amsterdam
- New Hampshire
- Number 43 (Joppa)
- Number 45
- Number 46
- Number 48 (Floyd Ward)
- Number 50 (Leeds)
- Number 51
- Number 53 (Union)
- Number 55
- Number 59
- Number 60
- Number 61
- Number 62
- Number 63 (Benab)
- Number 64 (Babylon)
- Number 65 (New Market)
- Number 67
- Number 68 (Carnarvon)
- Number 69 (Friendship)
- Number 70 (Massiah)
- Nurney
- Orealla (Oreala, Orealla Mission)
- Port Mourant (Port Mourant Village)
- Portuguese Quarters - Port Mourant
- Reliance
- Rising (Rising Sun, Number 47)
- Rose Hall
- Skeldon (Skeldon Place)
- Smythfield
- Springlands (Springlands Place, Eliza and Mary)
- Stanleytown
- Tain Settlement - Port Mourant
- Tain Resource - Port Mourant
- Train Line Dam - Port Mourant
- Ulverston
- Whim
- Williamsburg
- Yakusari
