= Nickerie District =

District of Suriname

Nickerie Distrikt Nickerie
- District
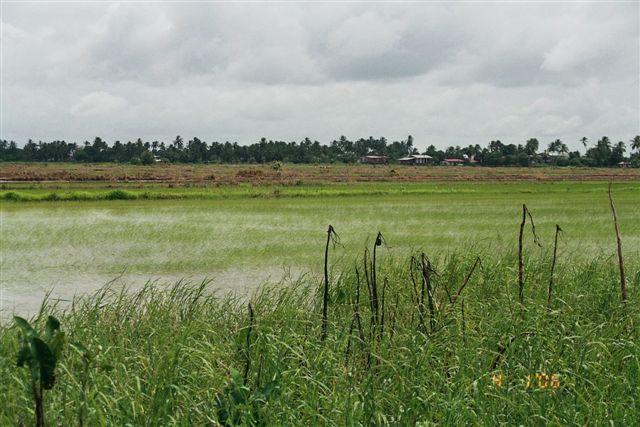
- Rice fields in Nickerie

- Map of Suriname showing Nickerie district
- Coordinates: 5°46′N 56°52′W
- Country: Suriname
- Capital: Nieuw-Nickerie

Area
  - Total: 5,353 km^{2} (2,067 sq mi)

Population (2012 census)
  - Total: 34,233
  - Density: 6.395/km^{2} (16.56/sq mi)
- Time zone: UTC-3

Nickerie is a predominantly rural district of Suriname located on the north-west coast. Nickerie's capital city is Nieuw-Nickerie. The district borders the Atlantic Ocean to the north, Coronie to the east, Sipaliwini to the south and East Berbice-Corentyne in Guyana to the west.

Nickerie has a population of 36.639 (2004) and an area of 5,353 km^{2}. Nickerie's population includes East Indian, Javanese, Afro-Surinamese, Chinese, and Europeans.

Nickerie is bordered by Guyana. A ferry connects Moleson Creek in Guyana and South Drain.

== History ==
Originally settled by Amerindians, Nickerie has an ancient 1st century BC settlement near the Wonotobo Falls. Between the 6th and 16th century, terpen (artificial mounds) were built near Hertenrits. In 1613, a tobacco plantation was established on the Courantyne River but was later abandoned.

In 1718, Dietzel became the first person to successfully settle in the area. In 1797, governor Jurriaan François de Friderici approved the first plantation in Nickerie. A large number of Scottish and English settlers arrived in the area during the British Occupation, and primarily grew cotton and coffee. The capital Nieuw Nickerie was built in 1879 after the former centre of the district, Nieuw Rotterdam, was destroyed by floods.

The name Nickerie is probably based on Neekeari which was first reported by Teenstra in 1596 for an indigenous tribe living the area. The name also appears in Robert Dudley's The Voyage of Robert Dudley to the West-Indies, 1594-1595.

In the 1960s, the construction of the East-West Link linked Nickerie with the rest of the country.

== Resorts ==
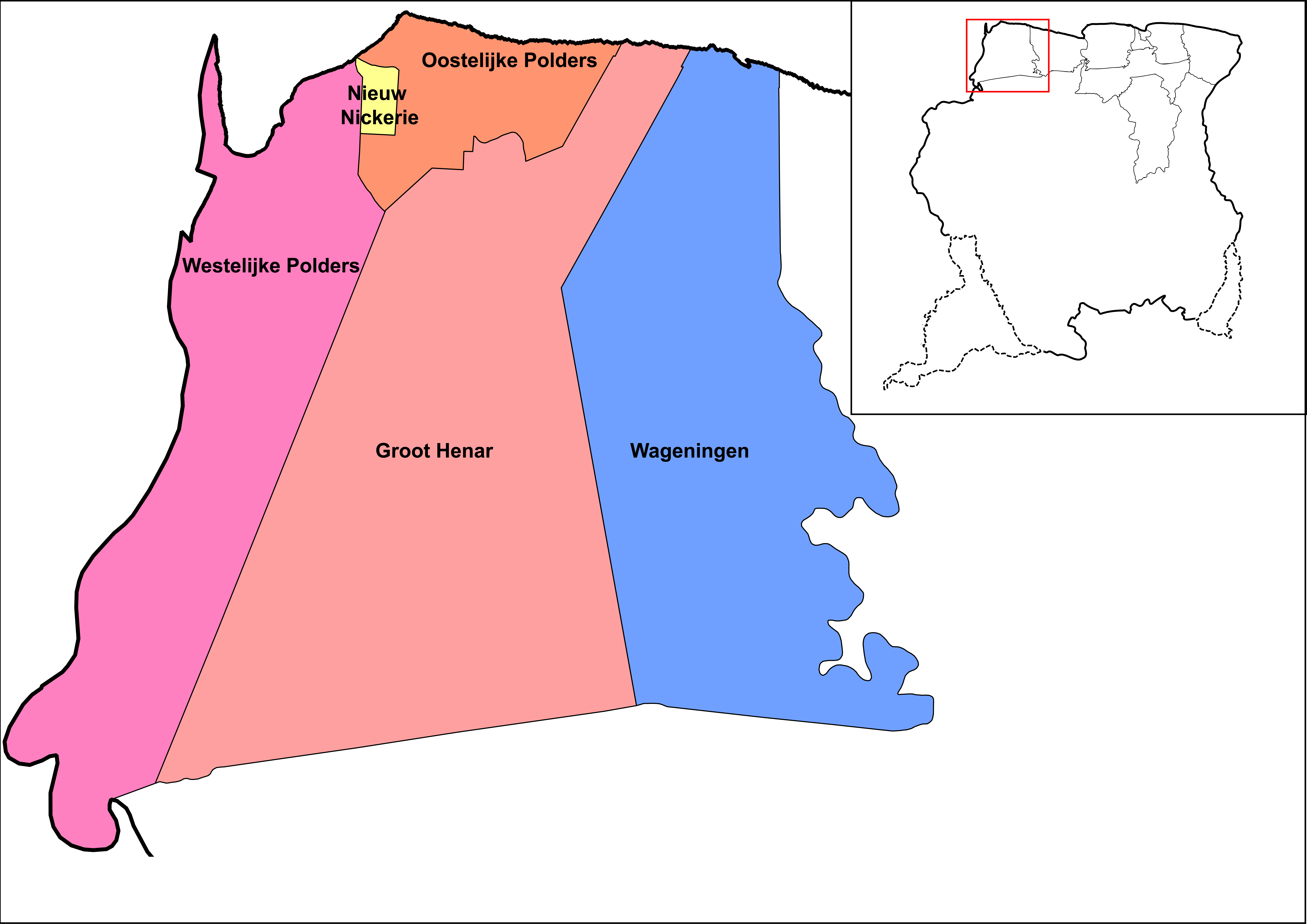
Resorts of Nickerie

- Groot Henar
- Nieuw Nickerie
- Oostelijke Polders
- Wageningen
- Westelijke Polders

== Villages ==
- Cupido
- Glasgow
- Hamptoncourtpolder
- Lokono Shikuabana
- Manchester
- Paradise
- South Drain

== Agriculture ==
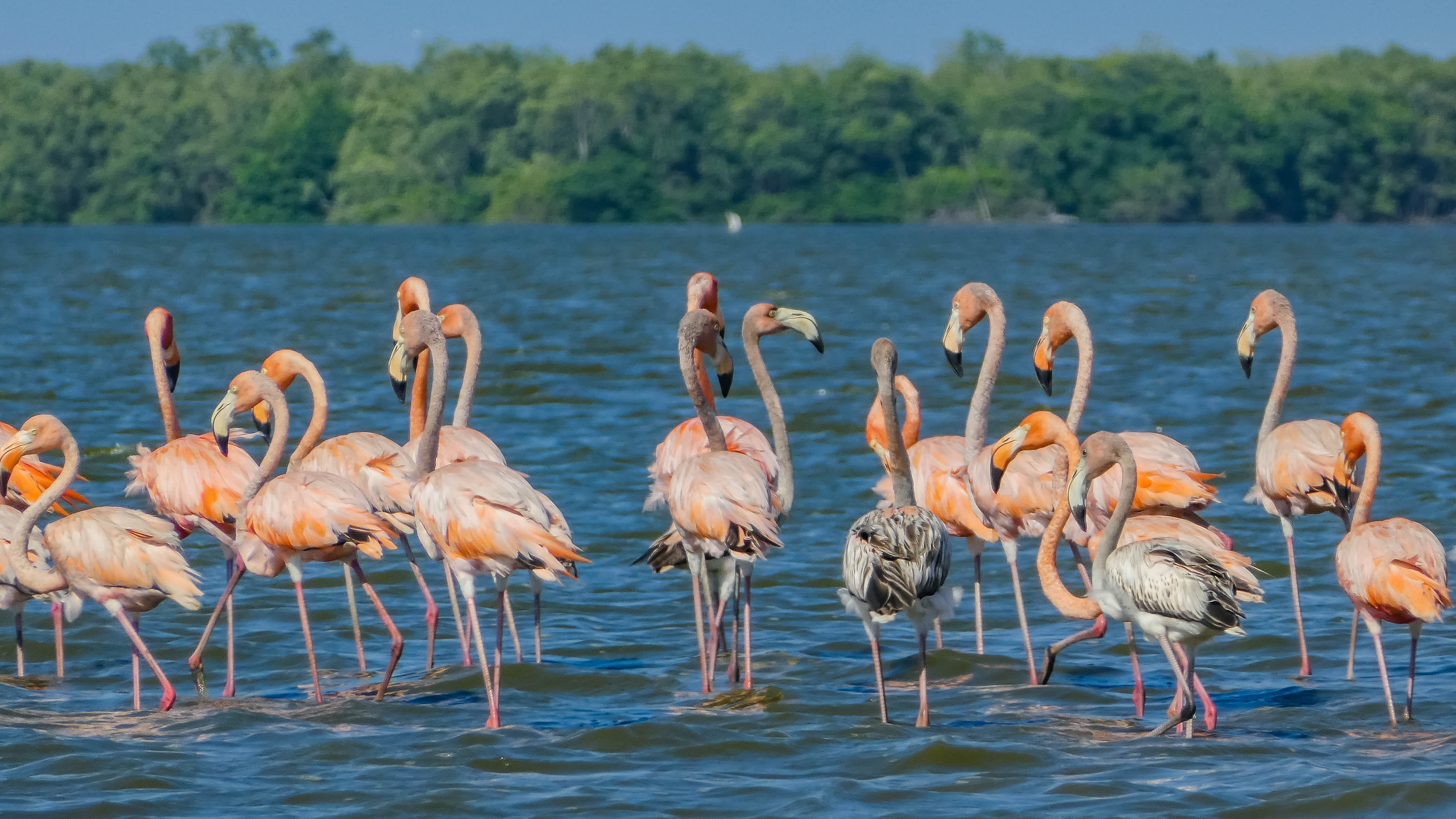
Flamingos in Bigi Pan

During the 19th century, Nickerie became home to many plantations. The abolition of slavery transformed the area in smaller scale farming. In the late 19 century, many plantations shifted to balatá production whose latex was used for driving belts and isolation, but started to become obsolete in the early 20th century. In 1955, a project of poldering started, resulting in an increase of cultivatable land.

Bananas and rice are the main crops grown in Nickerie. Some rice had been grown previously, but during the 20th century, Nickerie became the centre of the rice in Suriname, mainly due to the East Indian and Javanese indentured laborers.

== Tourism ==
Nieuw Nickerie is starting to develop as a tourist area. There are numerous hotels in the city, and the nearby Bigi Pan Nature Reserve opened opportunities for ecotourism. In 1972, the Hertenrits Nature Reserve was founded. In the reserve there are five terpen (artificial mounts). They were located in the middle of the swamp, and remains from the pre-Columbian era had been discovered in the mounts. Hertenrits has been incorporated into the Bigi Pan reserve.
