= Nickerie River =

River in Suriname

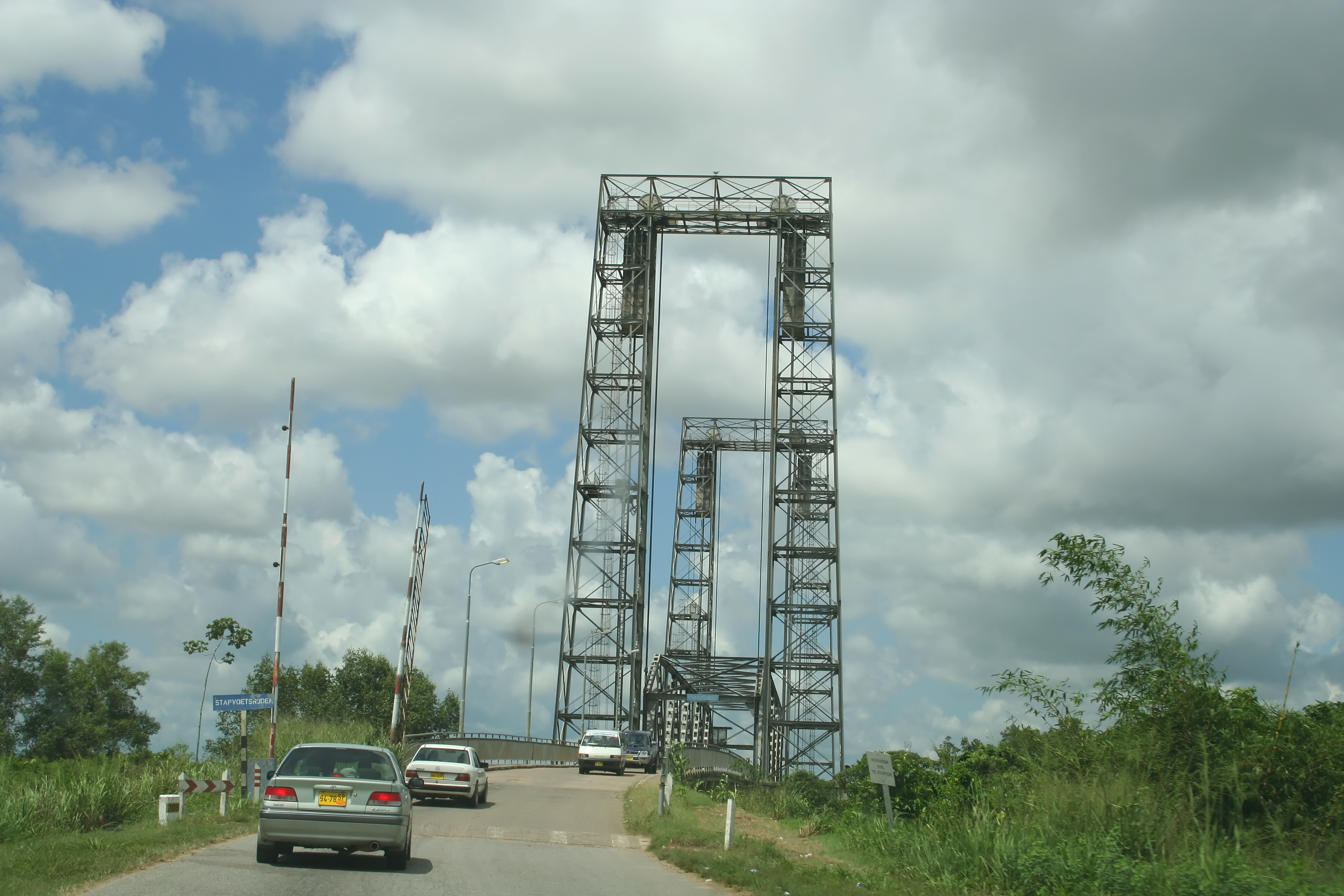
- Bridge near Groot Henar

- Location within Suriname

Location
- Country: Suriname
- District: Nickerie District

Physical characteristics
- Source
  - location: Bakhuis Mountains
  - coordinates: 4.2790°N 56.9693°W
- Mouth: Atlantic Ocean
  - coordinates: 5°58′10″N 57°00′56″W

The Nickerie River is a river in the northwestern part of Suriname.

The river originates in the Bakhuis Mountains and then flows to the North where it forms part of the border between the Coronie and Nickerie districts. The river then turns West and flows into the Atlantic Ocean via Wageningen and Nieuw-Nickerie. The Blanche Marie Falls are located on the river.

There is a bridge near Groot Henar that is part of the Northern East-West Link. Another, more basic bailey bridge was built near Kamp 52 on the Southern East-West Link.
