= Nieuw Nickerie =

- Resort and City
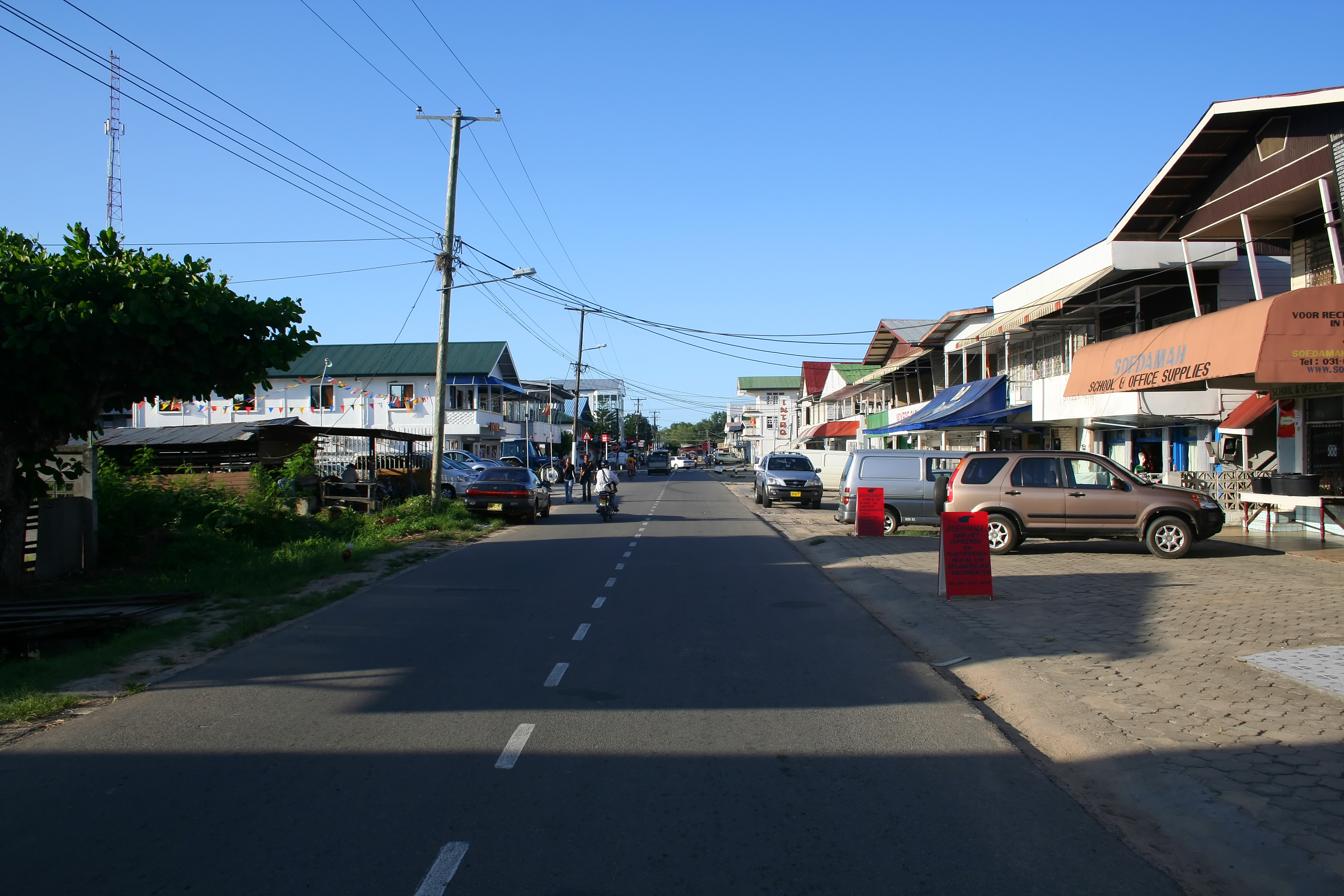
- Street in Nieuw Nickerie

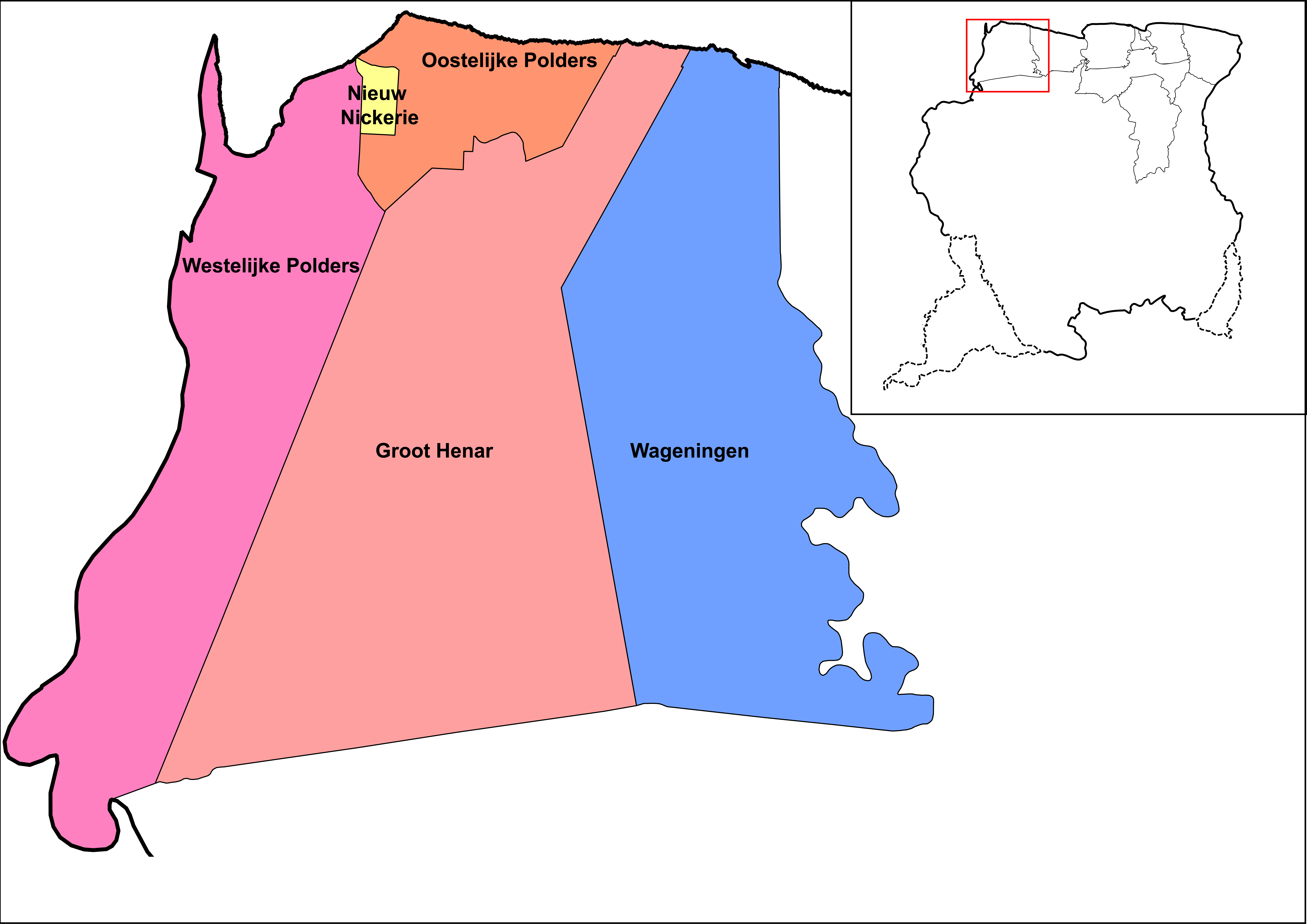

- Location in Suriname
- Coordinates: 05°56′N 56°59′W
- Country: Suriname
- District: Nickerie

Area
  - Total: 30 km^{2} (12 sq mi)
- Elevation: 0 m (0 ft)

Population (2012 census)
  - Total: 12,818
  - Density: 430/km^{2} (1,100/sq mi)
- Climate: Af/Am

Nieuw Nickerie is the third largest city in Suriname with a population estimated at 12,818 at the 2012 census. It is the capital city of the Nickerie district, and the terminus of the East-West Link.

Nieuw Nickerie lies on the mouth of the Nickerie river on the Atlantic coast, opposite the mouth of the Corantijn river (Courantyne) and the Guyanese town of Corriverton (Springlands), to which a ferry service operates. A bridge between Suriname and Guyana is still being planned. Major Henk Fernandes Airport, also known as Nieuw Nickerie Airport, is located near the city.

== History ==
In 1718, Dietzel became the first known person to settle in the area. In 1797, governor Jurriaan de Friderici approved the first plantation in Nickerie. A large number of Scottish and English settlers arrived in the area during the British Occupation, and primarily grew cotton and coffee. Nieuw Nickerie was built in 1879 after the former center of the district, Nieuw Rotterdam, was destroyed by floods. Nieuw Nickerie was originally planned on a polder created in 1869, but was moved further in land. In 1940s a sea dike was built to protect the area.

The name Nickerie is probably based on Neekeari which was first reported by Teenstra in 1596 for an indigenous tribe living the area. The name also appears in Robert Dudley's The Voyage of Robert Dudley to the West-Indies, 1594-1595.

== Economy ==
The main industries are bananas and rice. Nickerie is the largest rice producer of Suriname. The town contains a market and several hotels, including the Hotel Ameerali, Hotel de President, Hotel Tropical, Hotel de Vesting and Residence Inn. The first Surinamese hospital outside of Paramaribo, Mungra Medical Centre, is located on the Annastraat in Nieuw-Nickerie.

Nickerie has a harbour, but the entrance depth is 3.7 metres and can carter to ships up to 6,000 tonnes. The harbour has been upgraded in 2012, but will be upgraded further.

Nieuw Nickerie is started to develop as a tourist area. There are quite a number of hotels in the city, and the nearby Bigi Pan Nature Reserve opened opportunities for ecotourism.

== Notable people ==
- Clarence Breeveld (1948-2017), singer and musician.
- Ronald Hoop (1967), football player.
- Benito Kemble (1968), footballer.
- Jagernath Lachmon (1916-2001), politician.
- Ken Monkou (1964), footballer.
- Mellisa Santokhi-Seenacherry (1980), lawyer and First Lady of Suriname
- Ramkisoen Dewdat Oedayrajsing Varma (1907–1968), politician and Hindu priest.
- Ulrich Wilson (1964), football player.

== Climate ==
Nieuw Nickerie has a borderline tropical rainforest climate (Köppen Af) just short of being a tropical monsoon climate (Am). A distinctly drier period occurs from September to November, whilst May to July are the wettest months, although the weather is persistently uncomfortable, hot and humid throughout the year.

Climate data for Nickerie (1991-2020)
Month	Jan	Feb	Mar	Apr	May	Jun	Jul	Aug	Sep	Oct	Nov	Dec	Year
Record high °C (°F)	32.5 (90.5)	32.4 (90.3)	32.5 (90.5)	33.2 (91.8)	34.8 (94.6)	34.0 (93.2)	34.5 (94.1)	35.6 (96.1)	36.5 (97.7)	36.3 (97.3)	34.9 (94.8)	33.8 (92.8)	36.5 (97.7)
Mean daily maximum °C (°F)	27.4 (81.3)	27.5 (81.5)	28.8 (83.8)	29.2 (84.6)	29.2 (84.6)	29.3 (84.7)	28.6 (83.5)	30.3 (86.5)	29.8 (85.6)	30.9 (87.6)	29.2 (84.6)	29.2 (84.6)	29.1 (84.4)
Daily mean °C (°F)	26.0 (78.8)	26.0 (78.8)	27.4 (81.3)	27.6 (81.7)	27.5 (81.5)	27.3 (81.1)	26.7 (80.1)	28.2 (82.8)	27.7 (81.9)	28.7 (83.7)	27.2 (81.0)	27.4 (81.3)	27.3 (81.1)
Mean daily minimum °C (°F)	23.5 (74.3)	23.4 (74.1)	24.6 (76.3)	24.7 (76.5)	24.6 (76.3)	24.4 (75.9)	23.4 (74.1)	24.7 (76.5)	24.1 (75.4)	24.9 (76.8)	23.9 (75.0)	24.4 (75.9)	24.2 (75.6)
Record low °C (°F)	18.3 (64.9)	18.2 (64.8)	19.1 (66.4)	19.9 (67.8)	20.7 (69.3)	20.6 (69.1)	20.9 (69.6)	19.9 (67.8)	20.9 (69.6)	20.3 (68.5)	20.0 (68.0)	20.1 (68.2)	18.2 (64.8)
Average precipitation mm (inches)	126.7 (4.99)	109.7 (4.32)	103.4 (4.07)	140.0 (5.51)	238.7 (9.40)	237.3 (9.34)	230.7 (9.08)	155.9 (6.14)	64.9 (2.56)	53.1 (2.09)	74.1 (2.92)	152.7 (6.01)	1,682.5 (66.24)
Average relative humidity (%)	79.6	78.5	78.0	79.5	82.0	82.7	81.4	80.1	78.0	77.9	79.4	81.1	79.9
Source 1: NOAA
Source 2: Deutscher Wetterdienst (extremes)
